= KFC Original Recipe =

Secret blend of ingredients used in KFC fried chicken

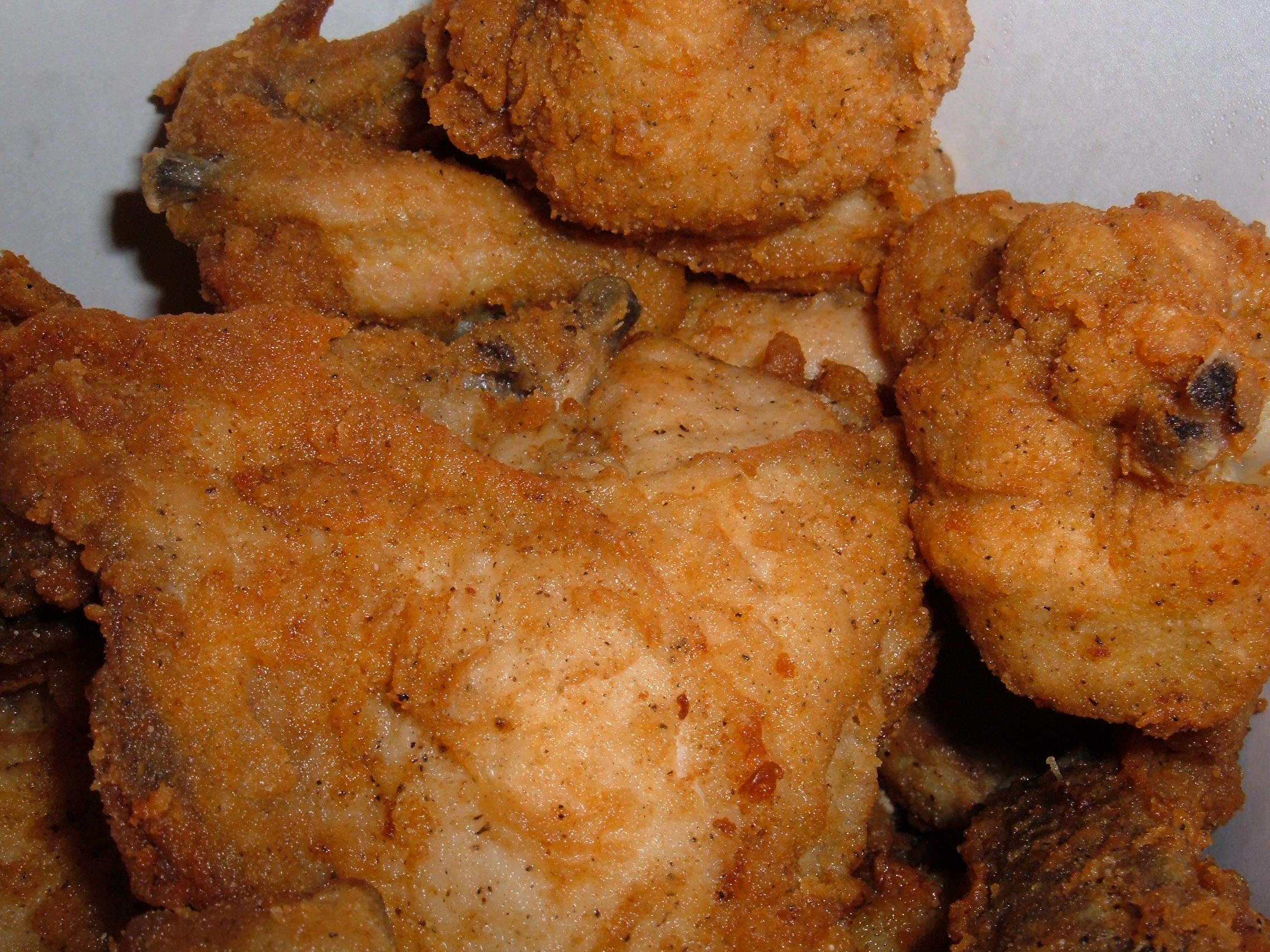
KFC Original Recipe chicken

The KFC Original Recipe is a secret mix of ingredients that fast food restaurant chain KFC uses to produce fried chicken. The Claudia Sanders Dinner House is the only other restaurant that serves an authorized version of the recipe.

By the very late 1930s, Harland Sanders' gas station in Corbin, Kentucky was so well known for its fried chicken that Sanders decided to remove the gas pumps and build a restaurant and motel in their place. While perfecting his secret recipe with 11 herbs and spices, Sanders found that pan frying chicken was too slow, requiring 30 minutes per order. Deep frying the chicken required half the time but produced dry, unevenly done chicken. In 1939, he found that using a pressure fryer produced tasty, moist chicken in eight or nine minutes. By July 1940, Sanders finalized what came to be known as his Original Recipe.

After Sanders formed a partnership with Pete Harman, they began marketing the chicken in the 1950s as Kentucky Fried Chicken; the company shipped the spices already mixed to restaurants to preserve the recipe's secrecy. He claimed that the ingredients "stand on everybody's shelf".

Sanders used vegetable oil for frying chicken. By 1993, for economic reasons, many KFC outlets had chosen to use a blend of palm and soybean oil. In Japan, the oil used is mainly the more expensive cottonseed and corn oil, as KFC Japan believes that this offers superior taste quality.

== History ==
Sanders' Original Recipe of "11 herbs and spices" is one of the most famous trade secrets in the catering industry. Franchisee Dave Thomas, better known as the founder of Wendy's, argued that the secret recipe concept was successful because "everybody wants in on a secret" and former KFC owner John Y. Brown, Jr. called it "a brilliant marketing ploy." The New York Times described the recipe as one of the company's most valuable assets. The recipe is not patented, because patents are published in detail and come with an expiration date, whereas trade secrets can remain the intellectual property of their holders in perpetuity.

KFC uses its Original Recipe as a means to differentiate its product from its competitors. Early franchisee Pete Harman credited the chain's popularity to the recipe and the product, and John Y. Brown cites the "incredibly tasty, almost addictive" product as the basis of KFC's staying power. On the other hand, Allen Adamson, managing director of brand consultancy Landor, remains unconvinced about the contribution of the secret formula aspect. He argues: "The story may still be part of these companies' folklore, but I'd be surprised if more than 2 percent buy the brand because of it."

== Recipes ==
A copy of the recipe, signed by Sanders, is stored within a vault at KFC's Louisville headquarters, along with 11 separate vials that each contain one of the ingredients. KFC employs two different firms, Griffith Laboratories and McCormick & Company, to formulate the blend; to maintain secrecy, each firm is given a different half of the recipe. Once the Griffith portion has been formulated, it is sent to McCormick and combined with the remaining ingredients there.

In 1983, William Poundstone conducted laboratory research into the coating mix, as described in his book Big Secrets, and claimed that a sample he examined contained only flour, salt, monosodium glutamate and black pepper. KFC maintains that it still adheres to Sanders' original 1940 recipe. In Todd Wilbur's television program Top Secret Recipe, Sanders's former secretary, Shirley Topmiller, revealed that Sanders learned from his mother that sage and savory are good seasonings for chicken. Also, Winston Shelton, a former friend of Sanders, said that the secret recipe contains Tellicherry black pepper.

It is well attested that Harland Sanders asked Bill Summers of Marion-Kay Spices in Brownstown, Indiana, US to recreate his secret blend of 11 herbs and spices. Sanders recommended the Marion-Kay seasoning to franchisees over the corporate version, as he believed the latter had been made inferior by the corporation's inattention. Following Sanders' passing, KFC sued Marion-Kay in 1982, and the latter was forbidden from selling its mixture to KFC franchises as a result. The Marion-Kay seasoning is still sold under the name "99-X", and according to Sanders biographer Josh Ozersky, it is indistinguishable from the original KFC recipe.

=== Joe Ledington ===
In August 2016, the Chicago Tribune reported that Joe Ledington of Kentucky, a nephew by marriage of Colonel Sanders, had claimed to have found a copy of the original KFC fried chicken recipe on a handwritten piece of paper in an envelope in a scrapbook. Tribune staffers conducted a cooking test of this recipe, which took several attempts to get right. They had to determine whether the "Ts" meant tablespoons or teaspoons.

After some trial and error, they decided the chicken should be soaked in buttermilk and coated once in the breading mixture, then fried in oil at 350 °F (177 °C) in a pressure fryer until golden brown. As a pressure fryer was too big, a deep fryer was used alternatively as a substitute. They also claimed that, with the addition of MSG as a flavor enhancer, they could produce fried chicken which tasted "indistinguishable" from fried chicken that they had purchased at KFC.

The recipe found by Joe Ledington reads as follows:

11 Spices – Mix With 2 Cups White Fl.
1) 2/3 Ts Salt
2) 1/2 Ts Thyme
3) 1/2 Ts Basil
4) 1/3 Ts Oregano
5) 1 Ts Celery salt
6) 1 Ts Black Pepper
7) 1 Ts Dried Mustard
8) 4 Ts Paprika
9) 2 Ts Garlic Salt
10) 1 Ts Ground Ginger
11) 3 Ts White Pepper

While Ledington expressed uncertainty that the recipe was the Original Recipe, he had a hand in mixing the Original Recipe for Colonel Sanders when he was a young boy, and recalled that white pepper was a principal ingredient.
