= Secret ingredient =

Component of a product, guarded from public disclosure

A secret ingredient is a component of a product that is closely guarded from public disclosure for competitive advantage. Sometimes the ingredient makes a noticeable difference in the way a product performs, looks or tastes; other times it is used for advertising puffery. Companies can go to elaborate lengths to maintain secrecy, repackaging ingredients in one location, partially mixing them in another and relabeling them for shipment to a third, and so on. Secret ingredients are normally not patented because that would result in publication, but they are protected by trade secret laws. Employees who need access to the secret are usually required to sign non-disclosure agreements.

== Notable secret ingredients ==
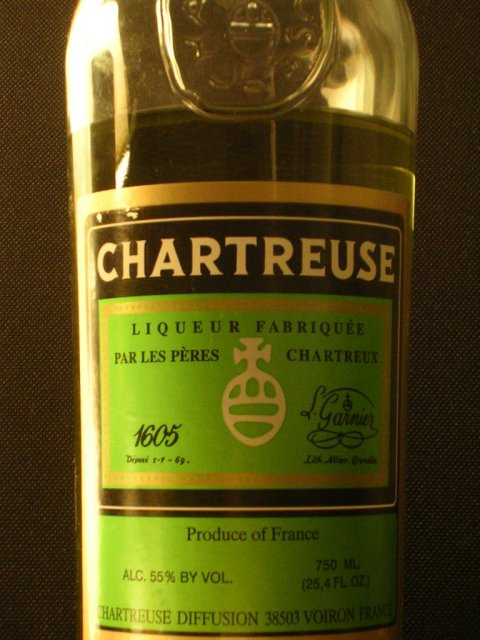
Green Chartreuse liqueur protected by confidential information of the ingredients

- Merchandise 7X, the "secret ingredient" or "secret formula" in Coca-Cola. The ingredient has remained a secret since its invention in 1886 by John Pemberton. The description of the ingredient is kept in a vault at the World of Coca-Cola in Atlanta, Georgia.
- KFC's "Colonel's secret recipe", created by Colonel Sanders in the 1930s. The recipe, which is advertised as containing "eleven herbs and spices", remains locked in a vault in Louisville, Kentucky.
- Special sauce, thought by some to be the variant of Thousand Island dressing used in the preparation of a McDonald's Big Mac hamburger.^{:23} According to Sarah J. Gim of The Huffington Post, the special sauce is thicker, sweeter and has a "slightly different taste". The ingredients in the sauce are available on McDonald's website. McDonald's decided to not only reveal the ingredients of the special sauce, but also the method used to make it.
- Irn-Bru's secret recipe, created by Robert Barr in 1901.
- Chartreuse liqueur, a green or yellow alcoholic drink made by the monks at a monastery in France. The secret of the 130 herbs used in its preparation is known to possibly as few as three monks.
- Becherovka, Czech traditional herbal liqueur. The liqueur is based on a blend of different herbs, known only to two current and three former employees of the distillery. All of them had to commit to secrecy until their death.
