= KFC Snacker =

Battered fried chicken sandwich

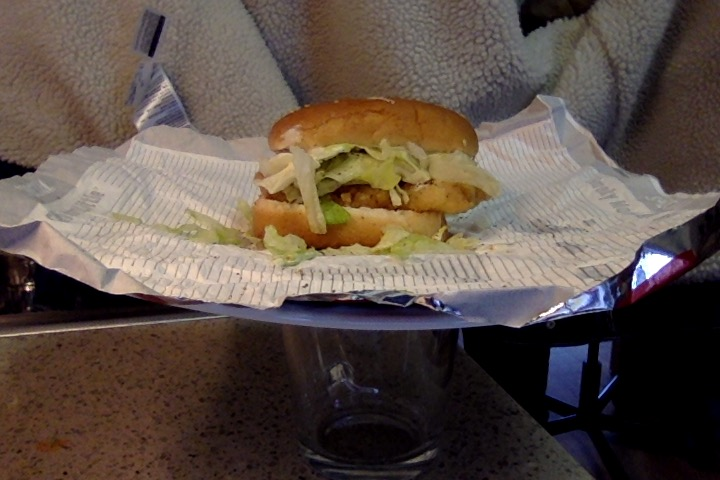
KFC Snacker

The KFC Snacker was a popular menu item from KFC during the early 2000s, but was discontinued around 2013–14. It was a battered fried chicken sandwich that featured a fried chicken cutlet with shredded lettuce and pepper mayonnaise (Originally Made with KFC ZINGER Sauce), with a sesame seed bun. The sandwich was noted to be affordable. Because of the affordability, many consumers started to buy it. The sandwich featured the Colonel's 11 herbs and spices, making it a "Bull's-eye for taste".

== Background ==
According to the Executive Vice President of Marketing at KFC, Scott Bergren "The KFC Snacker was a huge hit with consumers because it satisfies their need for a high-quality, affordable, portable chicken sandwich." Officials at KFC credit the popularity of the sandwich to its convenience and user-friendliness. Bergen also comments on the portability of the sandwich, lightly hinting at the idea that this sandwich is all around good—it tastes good, it's cheap, and it's transportable. Bergen added, "The KFC Snacker is an example of how KFC is becoming more relevant to today's consumers. We are appealing to individuals as well as families with products that are in tune with their lifestyle needs." According to Bergren, the Snacker is also a part of a campaign that KFC has taken on in order to appeal to the individual and families. This is easily noticeable in their more recent advertisements which feature a different, more lively and inviting version of the colonel, as well as an expansive amount of deals and coupons they offer such as the $5 fill-up meals or the family dinner combos.

There has been speculation that the sandwich was discontinued because of its perceived popularity. It drew attention away from KFC's main course, the classic bucket of chicken. The KFC Snacker's portability, combined with its engineered taste and cheap price made for a steep competition for KFC's original glory. This eventually led to the company discontinuing the sandwich all together around 2013–2014. Fans were frustrated and took to social media to voice their "dissatisfaction". KFC eventually released another small size chicken sandwich to replace the Snacker called the Chicken Little. The Chicken Little is similar to the Snacker except that it has pickles instead of lettuce, and plain mayonnaise instead of pepper mayonnaise. But unfortunately for many fans, the Chicken Little does not quite compare to the Snacker. Perhaps for some, the simplicity of just chicken, pickles, mayo, and bun is appealing. However, the textures in the Snacker, the crunchy lettuce combined with the crispy fried chicken, were missed by some consumers.
