= Claudia Sanders Dinner House =

Restaurant opened by Colonel Sanders

Coordinates: 38.2160°N 85.2786°W

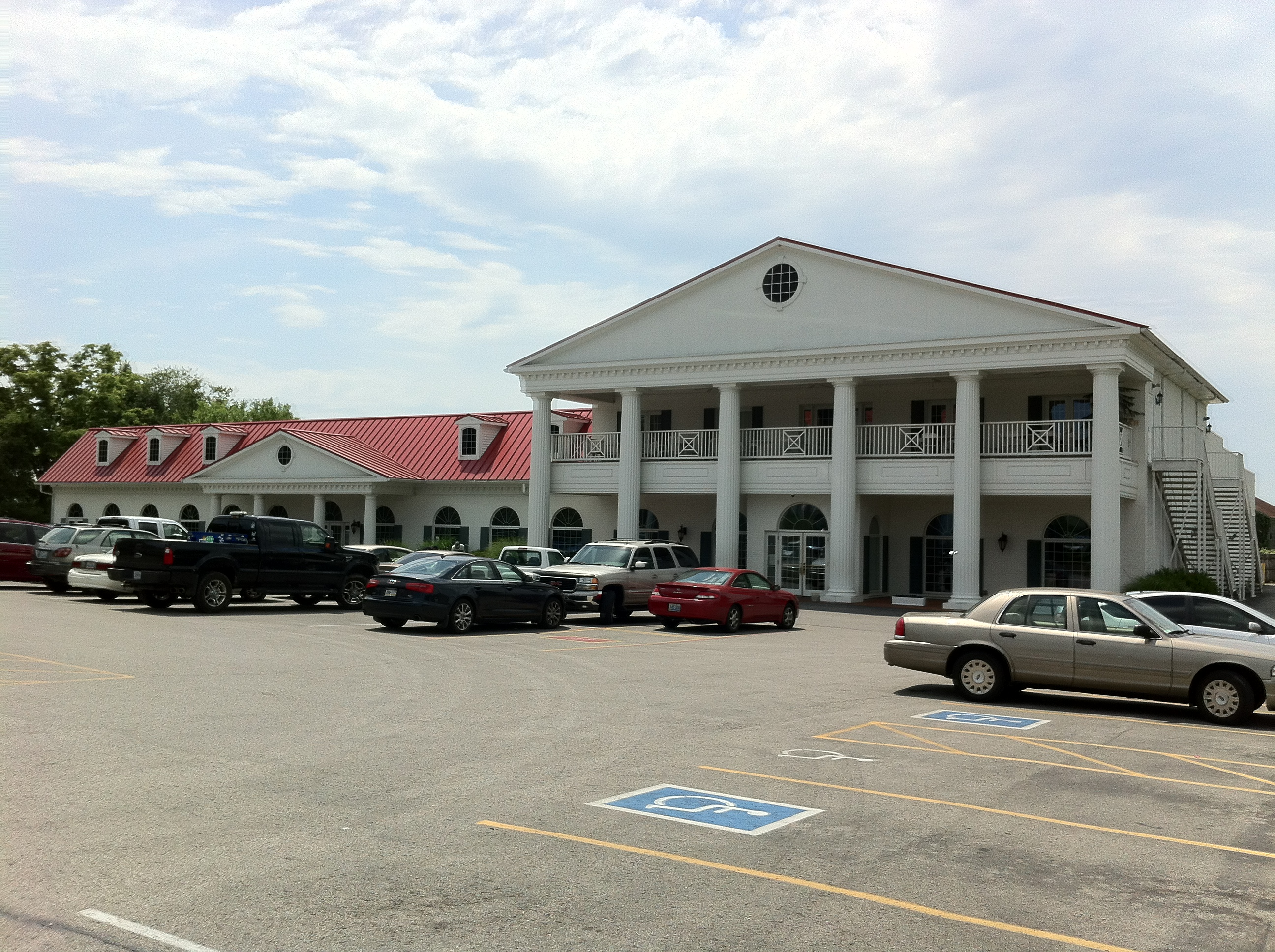
- The restaurant in 2013
- Interactive map of Claudia Sanders Dinner House

Restaurant information
- Established: 1968
- Previous owners: Colonel Sanders, Claudia Sanders
- Location: Shelbyville, Kentucky
- Website: claudiasandersshelbyville.com

Claudia Sanders Dinner House (formerly Claudia Sanders, The Colonel's Lady Dinner House) is a restaurant in Shelbyville, Kentucky, United States, opened by KFC founder Colonel Sanders and his wife, Claudia, in 1968. Colonel Sanders opened the restaurant after he had grown unhappy with recipe changes at KFC after selling the company. The restaurant was subject to a lawsuit by the owners of KFC as it was promoted by Sanders, who was also the face of KFC.

== History ==
The Dinner House is next to the house which the Sanders family lived in between 1959 and 1984, and became the first headquarters of Kentucky Fried Chicken.

In 1964, Sanders sold Kentucky Fried Chicken, and he later grew unhappy with the recipes that the franchise was using. In 1968, Colonel Sanders and his wife, Claudia, started the restaurant, originally named "Claudia Sanders, The Colonel's Lady Dinner House". After Kentucky Fried Chicken was bought by Heublein in 1971, Heublein was unhappy that Sanders was using his image for the competing restaurant (Sanders was a large face of Kentucky Fried Chicken). Heublein sued Sanders for this, and Sanders countersued the company for $122 million in 1974, claiming that Heublein was unlawfully using the Sanders face for products that he did not develop. Heublein settled out of court with a $1 million payment to Sanders, and the restaurant changed its name to Claudia Sanders Dinner House. After Colonel Sanders died in 1980, Claudia Sanders sold the restaurant.

In 1999, the restaurant burned down in four hours. It was later rebuilt. The restaurant was listed for sale in 2022 with an initial asking price of $9 million, which was reduced to $4.9 million the following year.

== Operations ==
Claudia Sanders Dinner House serves over 100,000 customers per year.
