= Todd Wilbur =

American recipe author

Todd Wilbur is an American author of the Top Secret Recipes series of cook books. The books contain clone recipes for famous named restaurant or pre-processed foods, such as McDonald's Big Mac and Nabisco's Oreo cookies. Wilbur has sold over five million books. Wilbur has appeared on Dr. Oz, Good Morning America, Fox & Friends, Today Show, The Oprah Winfrey Show and Steve Harvey.

On October 7, 2011, CMT premiered the new series Top Secret Recipe, where Wilbur set out to recreate an iconic American brand name food in three days.

Todd Wilbur is the creator of Hell Flakes, as well as a line of Top Secret Rubs that duplicate the taste of famous foods.

== Books ==
- Top Secret Recipes
- More Top Secret Recipes
- Top Secret Restaurant Recipes
- Top Secret Recipes Lite!
- Low-Fat Top Secret Recipes
- Top Secret Recipes – Sodas, Smoothies, Spirits, & Shakes
- Even More Top Secret Recipes
- The Best Of Top Secret Recipes (created exclusively for QVC)
- Top Secret Recipes Unlocked
- Top Secret Restaurant Recipes 2
- Top Secret Restaurant Recipes 3
- Top Secret Recipe STEP-BY-STEP
