= Pete Harman =

American businessman (1919–2014)

- Born: Leon Weston Harman; January 16, 1919; Granger, Utah, U.S.
- Died: November 19, 2014 (aged 95); Los Altos, California, U.S.
- Occupation: Entrepreneur
- Known for: Co-founder of Kentucky Fried Chicken
- Spouse: Arline T. Harman (m. 1938; died 2013)

Leon Weston "Pete" Harman (January 16, 1919 – November 19, 2014) was an American businessman best known for having struck a deal with Colonel Harland Sanders to open the first KFC franchise. Located in Salt Lake County, Utah, Harman's location opened for business in August 1952.

== Early life ==
Harman was born in 1919 in Granger, now a part of West Valley City, a suburb of Salt Lake City, Utah to David Reese Harman (1874–1924) and Grace May Hemenway (1879–1919). Harman was the youngest of 14 children in a Latter-day Saint family. Harman's mother died two days after he was born, and his father later married Caroline Hemenway Harman, the widow of Pete's uncle. Harman was a major donor to the construction of the Caroline Hemenway Harman Continuing Education Building at Brigham Young University, named after his step-mother.

Harman and his wife, Arline, opened their first restaurant, The Do Drop Inn, with two employees in 1941. They had met in the 1930s while both employees at the same restaurant in San Francisco, California, and married in 1938.

== Career ==
Harman worked with Sanders to develop and prepare the KFC system for franchising, working to develop training manuals and product guides. His other claims to fame are the development of the bucket packaging and the emphasis on the "Finger-lickin' good" motto.

In 1990 the International Foodservice Manufacturer Association recognized Harman's achievements with its Gold Plate Award. At the time of the award the Harman Management Corp. of Los Altos, California, employed over 4,000 people and operated 238 KFC stores in four states. Credit for his success was given to his enlightened practices towards his staff including stock purchase schemes.

His original KFC building was demolished in 2004 to make way for a museum and an updated restaurant. Harman relocated to Los Altos, California as the scope of his business expanded in the 1960s. He lived there until his death on November 19, 2014, at 95 years old.
