= Colonel Sanders =

American entrepreneur (1890–1980)

Colonel (Note: Sanders was given the honorary title "Kentucky Colonel" in 1935 by Governor Ruby Laffoon. The title is an honorific title, the highest awarded by the Commonwealth of Kentucky, and is not a military rank. The Governor of Kentucky bestows the honor of a colonel's commission by issuance of letters patent.) Harland Sanders
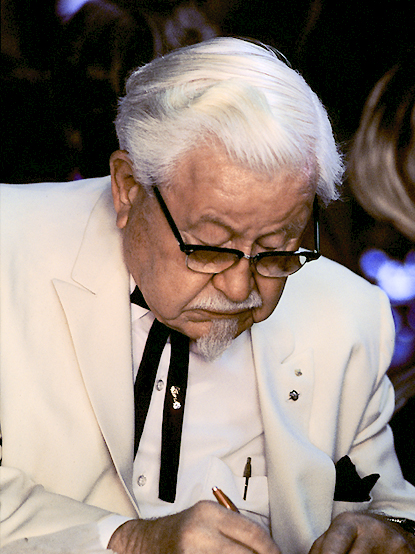
- Sanders in his famous outfit, c. 1974
- Born: Harland David Sanders; September 9, 1890; Henryville, Indiana, U.S.
- Died: December 16, 1980 (aged 90); Louisville, Kentucky, U.S.
- Resting place: Cave Hill Cemetery
- Education: La Salle Extension University
- Occupations: Businessman; restaurateur; entrepreneur
- Years active: 1930–1980
- Known for: Founding Kentucky Fried Chicken
- Spouses: Josephine King (m. 1909; div. 1947); Claudia Price (m. 1949)
- Children: 3
- Military service
- Branch: United States Army
- Service years: 1906–1907
- Rank: Private
- Unit: Wagoner
- Conflicts: Second Occupation of Cuba
- Awards: Cuban Pacification Medal

Harland David Sanders (September 9, 1890 – December 16, 1980), commonly known as Colonel Sanders, was an American entrepreneur and founder of fast food chicken restaurant chain Kentucky Fried Chicken (KFC). He later acted as the company's brand ambassador and symbol. His name and image are still symbols of the company today.

Sanders held a number of jobs in his early life, such as being a steam engine stoker, insurance salesman, and filling station operator. He began selling fried chicken from his roadside restaurant in North Corbin, Kentucky, during the Great Depression. During that time, Sanders developed his "secret recipe" and his patented method of cooking chicken in a pressure fryer. Sanders recognized the potential of the restaurant franchising concept, and the first KFC franchise opened in South Salt Lake, Utah, in 1952. When his original restaurant closed, he devoted himself full-time to franchising his fried chicken throughout the country.

The company's rapid expansion across the United States and overseas became overwhelming for the aging Sanders. In 1964, then 73 years old, he sold the company to a group of investors led by John Y. Brown Jr. and Jack C. Massey for US$2 million (equivalent to $20.8 million in 2025). He retained control of operations in Canada, and he became a salaried brand ambassador for Kentucky Fried Chicken. In his later years, he became highly critical of the food served at KFC restaurants and the cost-cutting measures that he said reduced its quality, referring to the gravy they made as "God-damned slop" with a "wallpaper taste".

== Life and career ==
=== 1890–1906: early life ===
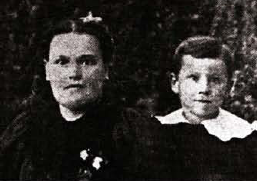
Sanders age 7 with his mother, 1897

Harland David Sanders was born on September 9, 1890, in a four-room house located 3 miles (5 km) east of Henryville, Indiana. He was the oldest of three children born to Wilbur David and Margaret Ann (née Dunlevy) Sanders. His mother was of Irish and Dutch descent. The family attended the Advent Christian Church. His father was a mild and affectionate man who worked his 80-acre (32 ha) farm until he broke his leg in a fall. He then worked as a butcher in Henryville for two years. Sanders's mother was a devout Christian and strict parent, continually warning her children of "the evils of alcohol, tobacco, gambling, and whistling on Sundays".

Sanders's father died in 1895. His mother got work in a tomato cannery, and the young Harland was left to look after and cook for his siblings. By the age of seven, in 1897, he was reportedly skilled with bread and vegetables, and improving with meat. The children foraged for food while their mother was away at work for days at a time. In 1899, his mother married Edward Park, but according to the 1900 census, his mother was widowed again. When he was 10, in 1900, Sanders began to work as a farmhand.

In 1902, Sanders's mother married William Broaddus and the family moved to Greenwood, Indiana. Sanders had a tumultuous relationship with his stepfather. In 1903, at age 12, he dropped out of seventh grade, later stating that "algebra's what drove [him] off", and went to live and work on a nearby farm. At age 13, he left home and took a job painting horse carriages in Indianapolis. When he was 14, he moved to southern Indiana to work as a farmhand again.

=== 1906–1930: various jobs ===
In 1906, with his mother's approval, Sanders left the area to live with his uncle in New Albany, Indiana. His uncle worked for the streetcar company, and secured Sanders a job as a conductor.

In October 1906, age 16, Sanders falsified his date of birth and enlisted in the United States Army. He served as a wagoner (see teamster) in Cuba, and was awarded the Cuban Pacification Medal (Army). In February 1907, he was honorably discharged and moved to Sheffield, Alabama, where his uncle lived. There, he met his brother Clarence, who had also moved there in order to escape their stepfather.

His uncle worked for the Southern Railway, and secured Sanders a job there as a blacksmith's helper in the workshops. After two months, Sanders moved to Jasper, Alabama, where he got a job cleaning out the ash pans of locomotives from the Northern Alabama Railroad, a division of the Southern Railway, when they had finished their runs.

Sanders progressed to become a fireman (steam engine stoker) from the age of 16. He worked the job for nearly three years and became involved in union affairs, where he defended a worker from being fired. This eventually came at the cost of his own job, as he got sick and was fired by the company under the pretense of insubordination.

In 1909, Sanders found laboring work with the Norfolk and Western Railway. While working on the railroad, he met Josephine King (October 2, 1888 – December 6, 1975) of Jasper, Alabama, and they were married on June 15, 1909, in Jasper. They had three children: Margaret Josephine Sanders, born March 29, 1910, in Jasper, and died October 19, 2001, in West Palm Beach, Florida; Harland David Sanders Jr., born on April 23, 1912, in Tuscumbia, Alabama, and died on September 15, 1932, in Martinsville, Indiana, from infected tonsils; and Mildred Marie Sanders Ruggles, born October 15, 1919, in Jeffersonville, Indiana, and died September 21, 2010, in Lexington, Kentucky.

Sanders then found work as a fireman on the Illinois Central Railroad, and he and his family moved to Jackson, Tennessee. By night, Sanders studied law by correspondence through the La Salle Extension University. Sanders lost his job with the Illinois Central after brawling with a colleague. While Sanders moved to work for the Rock Island Railroad, Josephine and the children went to live with her parents.

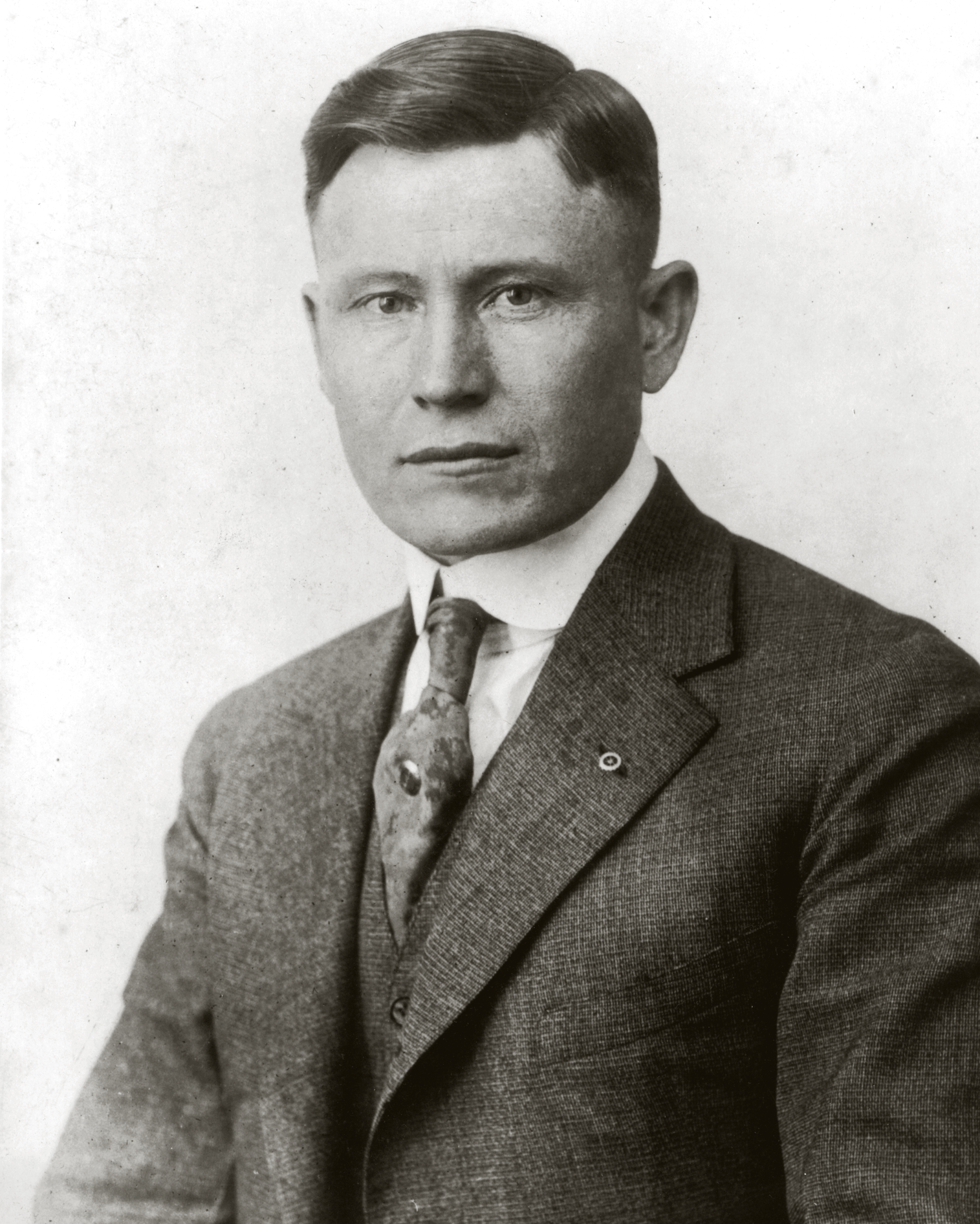
Sanders in 1914

After a while, Sanders began to practice law in Little Rock, which he did for three years, earning enough in fees for his family to move with him. His legal career ended after a courtroom brawl with his own client destroyed his reputation. This period represented a low point for Sanders. As his biographer John Ed Pearce wrote, "[Sanders] had encountered repeated failure largely through bullheadedness, a lack of self-control, impatience, and a self-righteous lack of diplomacy."

Following the incident, Sanders moved back in with his mother in Henryville, where he went to work as a laborer on the Pennsylvania Railroad. In 1916, the family moved to Jeffersonville, where Sanders got a job selling life insurance for the Prudential Life Insurance Company. Sanders was eventually fired for insubordination. He moved to Louisville and got a sales job with Mutual Benefit Life of New Jersey.

In 1920, at age 30, Sanders established a ferry boat company, which operated a boat on the Ohio River between Jeffersonville and Louisville. He canvassed for funding, becoming a minority shareholder, and was appointed secretary of the company. The ferry was an instant success. Around 1922 he took a job as a secretary at the Chamber of Commerce in Columbus, Indiana. He admitted that he was not very good at the job and resigned after less than a year. Sanders cashed in his ferry boat company shares for $22,000 ($416,000 today) and used the money to establish a company manufacturing acetylene lamps. The venture failed after Delco introduced an electric lamp that it sold on credit.

Sanders moved to Winchester, Kentucky, to work as a salesman for the Michelin Tire Company. He lost his job in 1924 when Michelin closed its New Jersey manufacturing plant. In 1924, by chance, he met the general manager of Standard Oil of Kentucky, who asked him to run a service station in Nicholasville. In 1930, the station closed as a result of the Great Depression.

=== 1930–1952: later career ===
In 1930, the Shell Oil Company offered Sanders a service station in North Corbin, Kentucky, rent-free, in return for paying the company a percentage of sales. Sanders began to serve chicken dishes and other meals such as country ham and steaks. Initially he served the customers in his adjacent living quarters before opening a restaurant. It was during this period that Sanders was involved in a shootout with Matt Stewart, a local competitor who had painted over a sign directing traffic to Sanders's station. Stewart killed a Shell employee who was with Sanders, and was convicted of murder, eliminating Sanders's competition.

Sanders was commissioned as a Kentucky Colonel in 1935 by Kentucky governor Ruby Laffoon. His local popularity grew, and, in 1939, food critic Duncan Hines visited Sanders's restaurant and included it in Adventures in Good Eating, his guide to restaurants throughout the US. The entry read:

Corbin, KY. Sanders Court and Café
41 — Jct. with 25, 25 E. ½ Mi. N. of Corbin. Open all year except Xmas.
A very good place to stop en route to Cumberland Falls and the Great Smokies. Continuous 24-hour service. Sizzling steaks, fried chicken, country ham, hot biscuits. L. 50¢ to $1; D., 60¢ to $1

In July 1939, Sanders acquired a motel in Asheville, North Carolina. In November 1939, his North Corbin restaurant and motel was destroyed in a fire. Sanders had it rebuilt as a motel with a 140-seat restaurant. In July 1940, age 50, Sanders finalized his "Secret Recipe" for frying chicken in a pressure fryer that cooked the chicken faster than pan frying.

As the United States entered World War II in December 1941, gas was rationed. As tourism dried up, Sanders was forced to close his Asheville motel. He went to work as a supervisor in Seattle until the latter part of 1942. He later ran cafeterias for the government at an ordnance works in Tennessee, followed by a job as assistant cafeteria manager in Oak Ridge, Tennessee.

He left his mistress, Claudia Ledington-Price, as the manager of the North Corbin restaurant and motel. In 1942, he sold the Asheville business. In 1947, he and Josephine divorced. In 1949, Sanders married Claudia, as he had long desired. In 1950, Sanders was "re-commissioned" as a Kentucky Colonel by his friend, Governor Lawrence Wetherby.

=== 1952–1980: Kentucky Fried Chicken ===
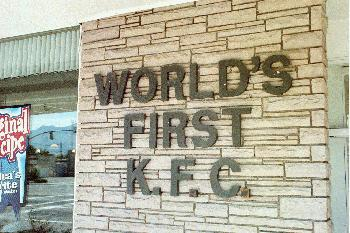
The world's first KFC franchise, located in South Salt Lake, Utah

In 1952, Sanders franchised his secret recipe "Kentucky Fried Chicken" for the first time, to Pete Harman of South Salt Lake, Utah, the operator of one of that city's largest restaurants. In the first year of selling the product, restaurant sales more than tripled, with 75% of the increase coming from sales of fried chicken. For Harman, the addition of fried chicken was a way of differentiating his restaurant from competitors. In Utah, a product hailing from Kentucky was unique and evoked imagery of Southern hospitality. Don Anderson, a sign painter hired by Harman, coined the name Kentucky Fried Chicken. After Harman's success, several other restaurant owners franchised the concept and paid Sanders $0.04 per chicken, equivalent to $0.48 in 2025.

Sanders believed that his North Corbin restaurant would remain successful indefinitely; however, he sold it at age 65 after the new Interstate 75 reduced customer traffic. Left only with his savings and US$105 a month from Social Security, equivalent to $1,262 in 2025, Sanders decided to begin to franchise his chicken concept in earnest, and traveled the US looking for suitable restaurants. In 1959, after closing the North Corbin site, Sanders and Claudia opened a new restaurant and company headquarters in Shelbyville. Often sleeping in the back of his car, Sanders visited restaurants, offered to cook his chicken, and if workers liked it, negotiated franchise rights.

Although such visits required much time, eventually potential franchisees began visiting Sanders instead. He ran the company while Claudia mixed and shipped the spices to restaurants. The franchise approach became highly successful; KFC was one of the first fast food chains to expand internationally, opening outlets in Canada and later in the UK, Australia, Mexico and Jamaica by the mid-1960s. In 1962, Sanders obtained a patent protecting his method of pressure frying chicken, and trademarked the phrase "It's Finger Lickin' Good" in 1963.

The company's rapid expansion to more than 600 locations became overwhelming for the aging Sanders. In 1964, then 73 years old, he sold the Kentucky Fried Chicken corporation for $2 million ($20.8 million today) to a partnership of Kentucky businessmen headed by John Y. Brown Jr., a 29-year-old lawyer and future governor of Kentucky, and Jack C. Massey, a venture capitalist and entrepreneur. Sanders became a salaried brand ambassador. The initial deal did not include the Canadian operations, which Sanders retained, or the franchising rights in the UK, Florida, Utah, and Montana, which Sanders had already sold to others.

In 1965, Sanders moved to Mississauga, Ontario, a suburb of Toronto, to oversee his Canadian franchises and continued to collect franchise and appearance fees in Canada and in the US. Sanders bought and lived in a bungalow at 1337 Melton Drive with his wife Claudia in the Lakeview area of Mississauga from 1965 until his death in 1980. In September 1970, he and his wife were baptized in the Jordan River. He also befriended Billy Graham and Jerry Falwell.

Sanders remained the company's symbol after selling it, traveling 200,000 miles (320,000 km) a year on the company's behalf and filming many TV commercials and appearances. He retained much influence over executives and franchisees, who respected his culinary expertise and feared what The New Yorker described as "the force and variety of his swearing" when a restaurant or the company varied from what executives described as "the Colonel's chicken".

One change the company made was to the gravy, which Sanders had bragged was so good that "it'll make you throw away the durn chicken and just eat the gravy" but which the company simplified to reduce time and cost. As late as 1979 Sanders made surprise visits to KFC restaurants, and if the food disappointed him, he denounced it to the franchisee as "God-damned slop" or pushed it onto the floor.

In 1973, Sanders sued Heublein Inc.—the then parent company of Kentucky Fried Chicken—over the alleged misuse of his image in promoting products he had not helped develop. In 1975, Heublein Inc. unsuccessfully sued Sanders for libel after he publicly described their gravy as being "sludge" with a "wallpaper taste".

Sanders and his wife reopened their Shelbyville restaurant as "Claudia Sanders, The Colonel's Lady" and served KFC-style chicken there as part of a full-service dinner menu, and talked about expanding the restaurant into a chain. He was sued by the company for it. After reaching a settlement with Heublein, he sold the Colonel's Lady restaurant, and it has continued to operate, currently as the Claudia Sanders Dinner House. It serves his "original recipe" fried chicken as part of its non-fast-food dinner menu, and is the only non-KFC restaurant that serves an authorized version of the fried chicken recipe.

Sanders remained critical of Kentucky Fried Chicken's food. In an October 1975 article in the Louisville Courier-Journal, he told journalist Dan Kauffman:

My God, that gravy is horrible. They buy tap water for 15 to 20 cents a thousand gallons and then they mix it with flour and starch and end up with pure wallpaper paste. And I know wallpaper paste, by God, because I've seen my mother make it. ... There's no nutrition in it and they ought not to be allowed to sell it. ... [The] crispy [fried chicken] recipe is nothing in the world but a damn fried doughball stuck on some chicken.

== Public image and personality ==
After being recommissioned as a Kentucky colonel in 1950 by Governor Lawrence Wetherby, Sanders began to dress the part, growing a goatee and wearing a black frock coat (later switching to a white suit) and a black ribbon bow tie, and referring to himself as "Colonel". His associates went along with the title change, "jokingly at first and then in earnest", according to biographer Josh Ozersky.

He never wore anything else in public during the last 20 years of his life, using a heavy wool suit in the winter and a light cotton suit in the summer. He bleached his mustache and goatee to match his white hair.

John Y. Brown Jr. remembered Sanders as "a brilliant man with a gourmet flair for food, a visionary and a great motivator, with the style of a showman and the discipline of a Vince Lombardi."

Sanders was a 33° Scottish Rite Freemason according to his autobiography, Life As I Have Known It Has Been Finger Lickin' Good.

== Death ==
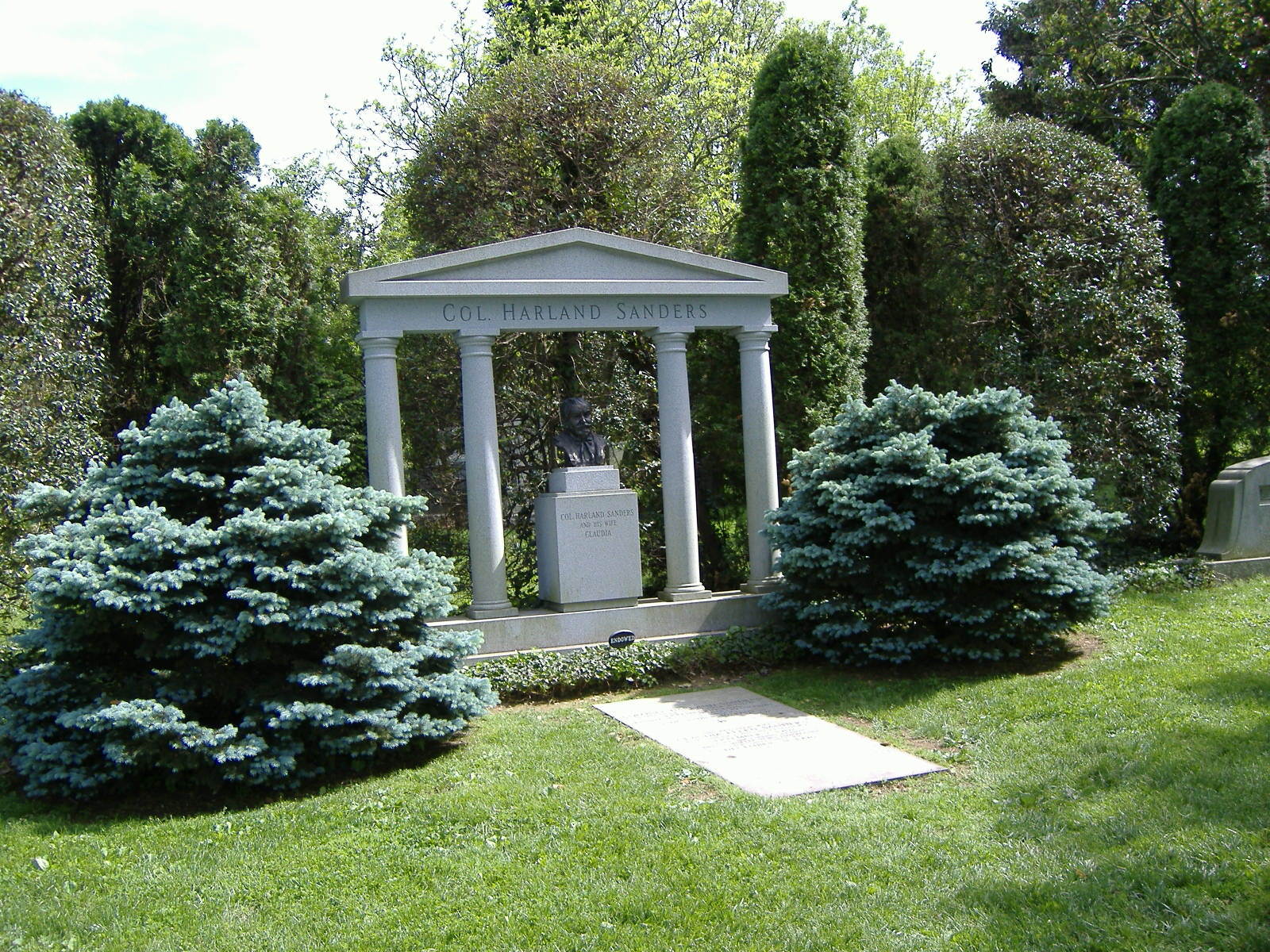
Colonel Sanders's gravesite

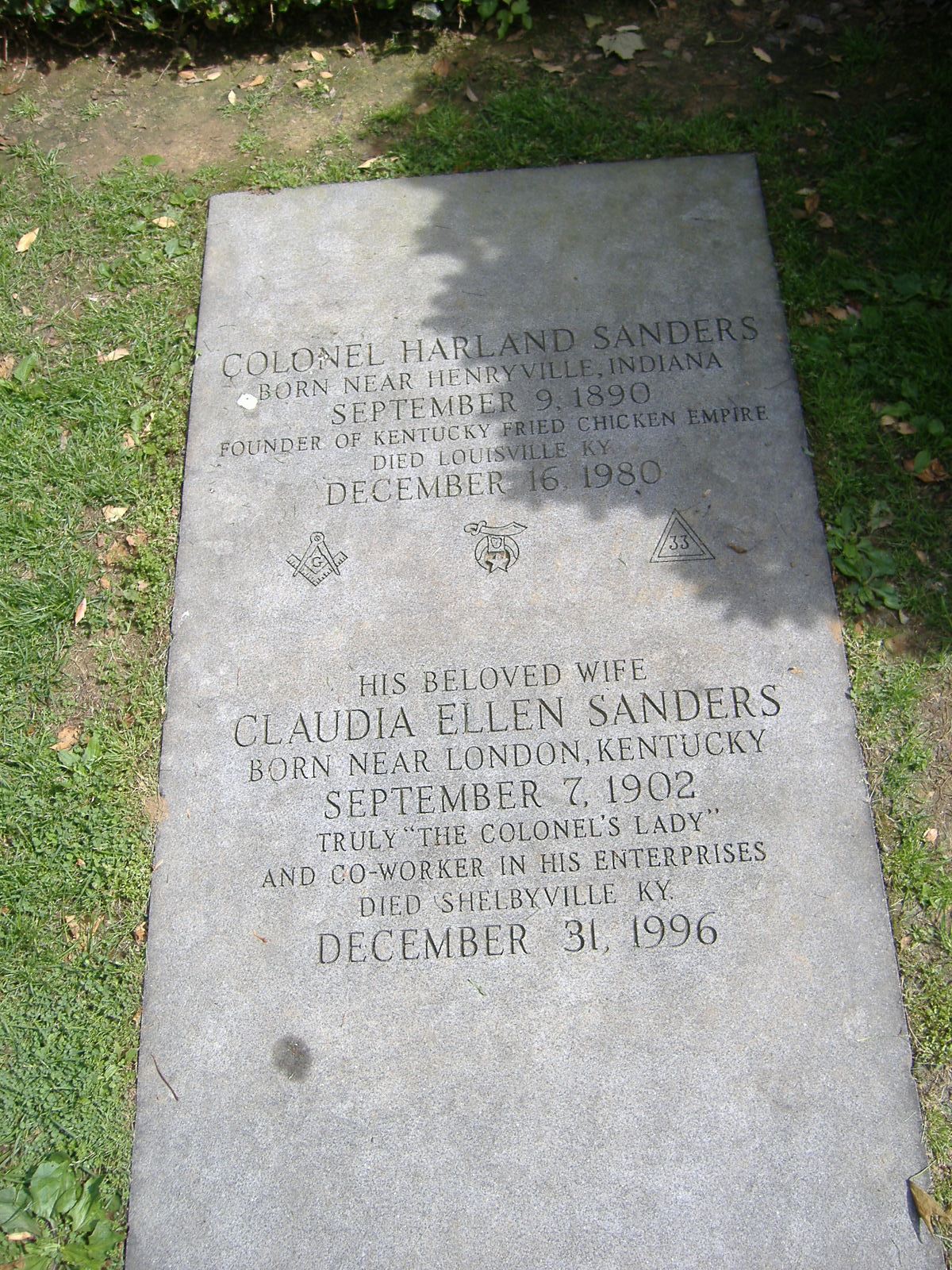
Sanders's and his wife's grave at Cave Hill Cemetery in Louisville, Kentucky

Sanders was diagnosed with acute leukemia in June 1980. He died at Jewish Hospital in Louisville of pneumonia six months later, on December 16, at the age of 90. Sanders had remained active until the month before his death, appearing in his white suit to crowds.

His body was laid in state in the rotunda of the Kentucky State Capitol in Frankfort after a funeral service at the Southern Baptist Theological Seminary Chapel, which was attended by more than 500 people. His body was also displayed in an open casket during a memorial service that was held at KFC's headquarters in Louisville; about 1,000 to 1,200 people attended the service. Sanders was buried in his characteristic white suit and black western string tie in Cave Hill Cemetery in Louisville.

His wife, Claudia, died on December 31, 1996, at the age of 94.

By the time of Sanders's death, there were an estimated 6,000 KFC outlets in 48 countries worldwide, with $2 billion in sales annually.

== Legacy ==
=== As a symbol of the KFC brand ===
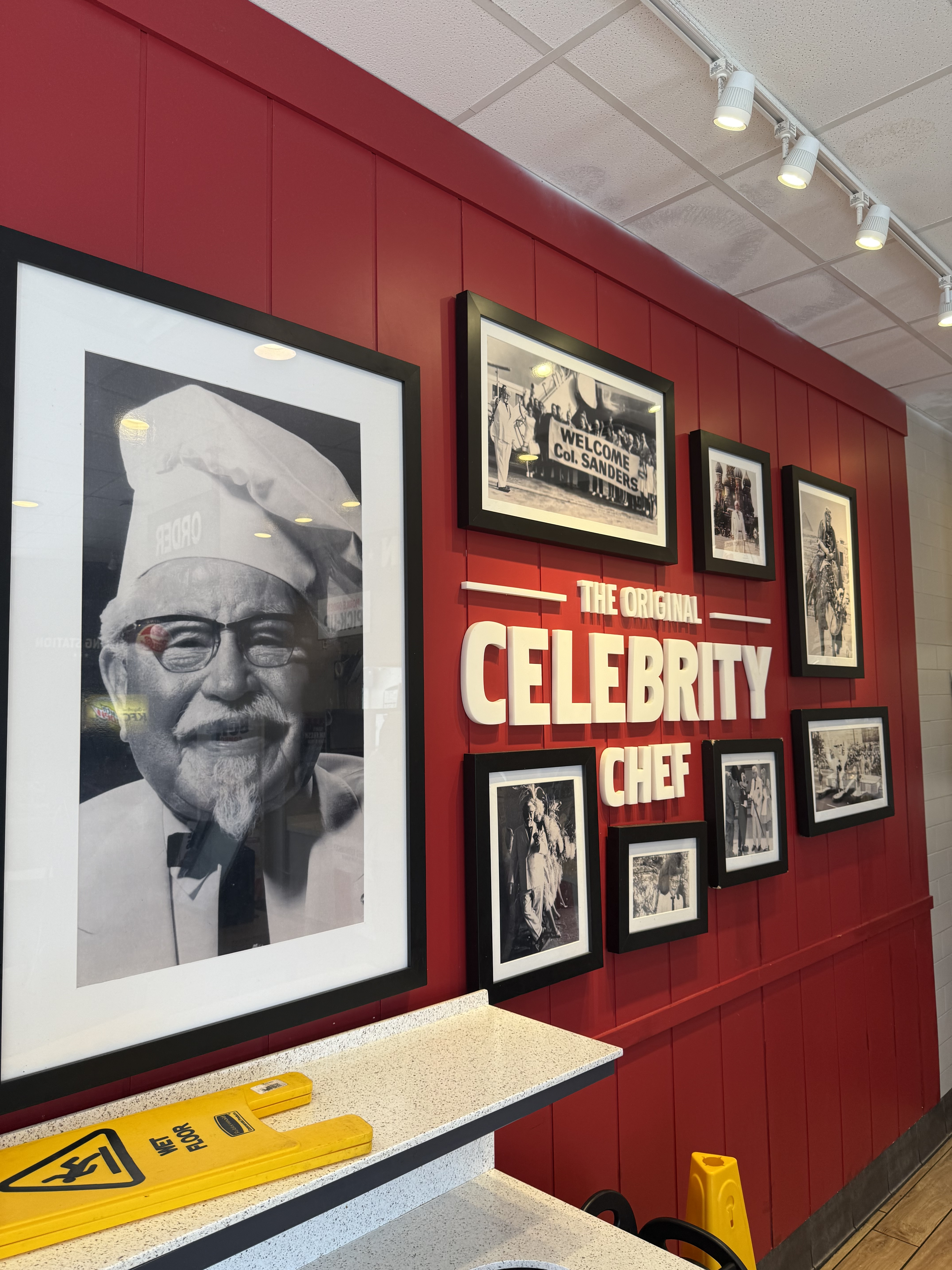
Antique photos of Colonel Sanders inside an American KFC

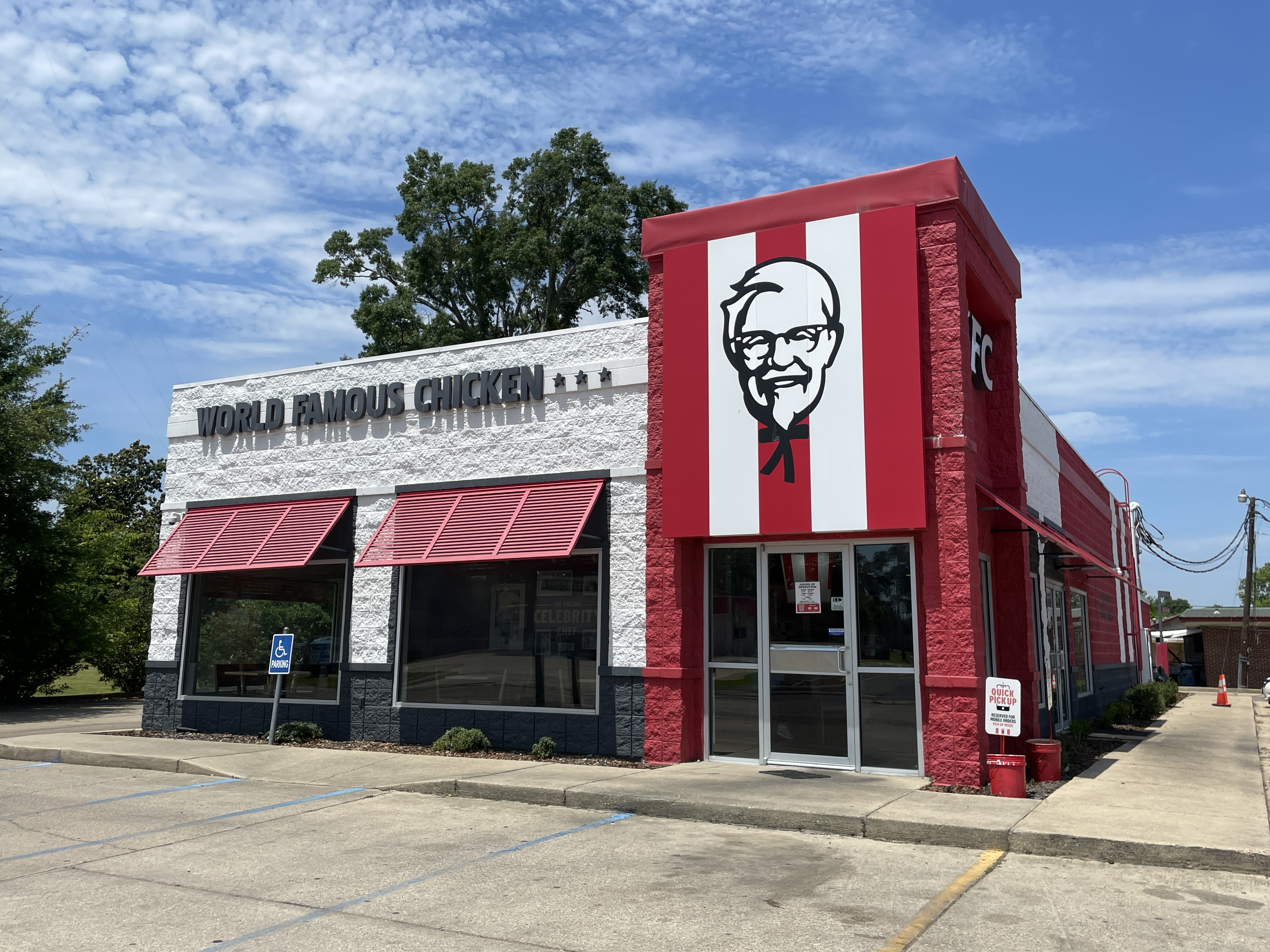
KFC's logo is based on his appearance.

A fictionalized Colonel Sanders has repeatedly appeared as a mascot in KFC's advertising and branding. Sanders has been voiced by impressionists in radio ads, and from 1998 to 2001 an animated version of him voiced by Randy Quaid appeared in television commercials.

In May 2015, KFC brought the Colonel Sanders character back in new television advertisements, played by comedian Darrell Hammond. Some commentators felt the new portrayal was distasteful and disrespectful of the actual man's legacy.

In August 2015, KFC launched a new campaign, this time with comedian Norm Macdonald portraying Sanders; the first ad of the campaign makes direct reference to the Hammond campaign, with a brief piece of footage of Hammond followed by Macdonald's Colonel declaring his predecessor an impostor.

In February 2016, yet another portrayal was introduced with Jim Gaffigan as the Colonel, shown bolting awake in bed and telling his wife about his recurring nightmare of Macdonald's Colonel "pretending to be me".

By July 2016, George Hamilton was playing Colonel Sanders, parlaying his famous tan into an advertisement for KFC's "extra crispy" chicken.

During the airing of the 2016 SummerSlam, a commercial aired of WWE wrestler Dolph Ziggler dressed up as Colonel Sanders beating up a man in a chicken suit, played by fellow wrestler The Miz, in a wrestling ring.

In September 2016, comedian Rob Riggle played Sanders in an ad introducing a football team named "The Kentucky Buckets".

In January 2017, to advertise their "Georgia Gold Honey Mustard BBQ" Chicken offerings, actor Billy Zane took over the role as the "Solid Gold Colonel".

In April 2017, actor Rob Lowe was announced as the newest actor in the role of Colonel Sanders. Lowe said that as a child, he actually got to meet Harland Sanders.

In 2017, WWE returned to using Colonel Sanders, showing ads of Shawn Michaels and Kurt Angle playing him, and announcing that Colonel Sanders would be available as a playable character in WWE 2K18, accessible through the "create-a-wrestler" feature, as part of a product placement deal with KFC.

Ray Liotta then portrayed Sanders. Singer Reba McEntire was named as the newest Sanders in January 2018, and made her debut in a commercial promoting the fast food chain's new "Smoky Mountain BBQ" chicken.

As of August 2018, actor Jason Alexander and professional strongman and actor Hafþór Júlíus Björnsson both portray Colonel Sanders.

In early 2019, Peter Weller portrayed a RoboCop version of Colonel Sanders. Later that year, Sean Astin played a Rudy Ruettiger version of the Colonel to commemorate the beginning of the NFL season.

In 2019, a free video game was commissioned by the restaurant chain KFC and released for free called I Love You, Colonel Sanders!. A parody of conventional dating sims, the primary objective of the player is to develop a romantic relationship with a fictionalized version of KFC's founder Colonel Sanders, portrayed as an attractive classmate at a cooking school.

In December 2020, a fictionalized Colonel Sanders was portrayed by Mario Lopez in the 2020 short film A Recipe for Seduction.

In 2025, French-Brazilian chef and TV personality Érick Jacquin portrayed Colonel Sanders on KFC's Brazilian commercials of its "Crunch Salad" sandwich.

=== Beyond KFC ===
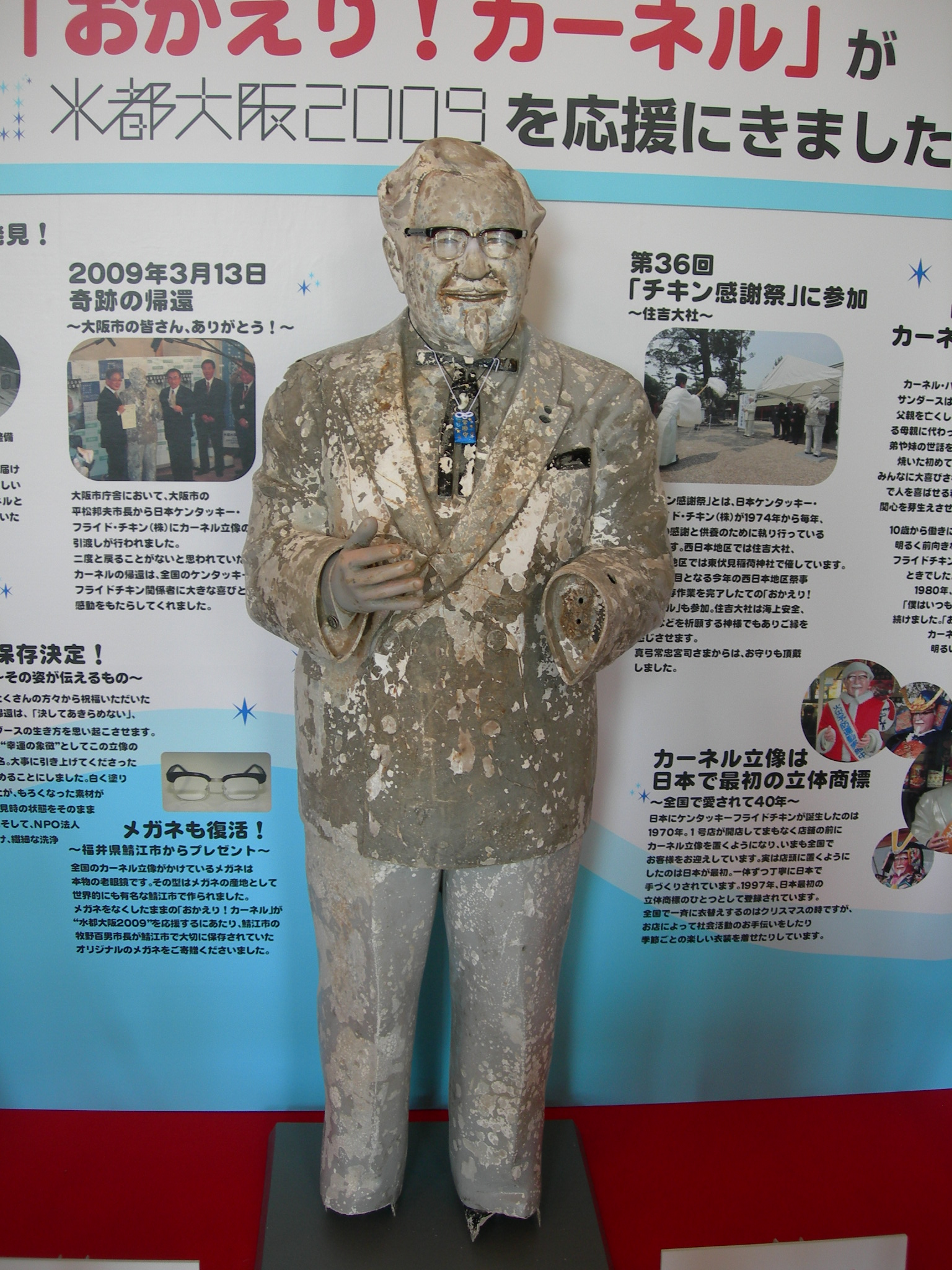
A statue of Colonel Sanders was thrown into a river in Japan, which fans of the Hanshin Tigers believed caused Sanders's ghost to curse the team.

The Japanese Nippon Professional Baseball league developed an urban legend of the "Curse of the Colonel". In 1985, a statue of Colonel Sanders was thrown into a river and lost during a fan celebration. According to the legend, the "curse" has caused Japan's Hanshin Tigers to perform poorly since the incident. It was said that unless the statue was fully recovered, the Tigers would never win the Japan Series again. After a handful of losses in 2003, 2005, and 2014, Hanshin prevailed in 2023.

Characters based on Colonel Sanders have appeared in popular fiction. The Colonel appears as a character within the DC Comics multiverse in three promotional issues, with titles parodying other DC Comics titles – The Colonel of Two Worlds (a parody of Flash of Two Worlds), The Colonel Corps: The Crisis of Infinite Colonels (a parody of Crisis on Infinite Earths), and Across The Universe, teaming up with characters such as Green Lantern and Flash.

Alternate versions of himself include a female version, a Teen Titans Go! version, and a chicken version, to battle villains such as the "Anti-Colonel" of Earth-3, "Colonel Grodd" (a Colonel version of Gorilla Grodd) and Larfleeze. The writer of the comics, Tony Bedard, said "It's been an honor, a privilege, and just plain fun working on the last two KFC comics. I'm super-excited the story is a trilogy now, with the Colonel planet-hopping across the DC Universe. As a former Green Lantern writer, it's great to revisit Hal Jordan and the Green Lantern Corps."

In a 2018 episode of the soap opera General Hospital, Sanders is shown to know esoteric programming language Malbolge, which he uses to disarm a bomb intended to compel him to reveal his secret recipe.

In the 2002 novel Kafka on the Shore by Haruki Murakami, Colonel Sanders appears when an "abstract concept" takes on the appearance of "a famous capitalist icon".

In 2017, KFC released a 96-page romance novella, Tender Wings of Desire, in time for Mother's Day. Set in Victorian England, it centers on Lady Madeline Parker, who "must choose between a life of order and a man of passion", and featuring Sanders as the love interest, and ostensibly the writer. It was made available as a free download via Amazon.

One of Colonel Sanders's white suits with its black clip-on bow-tie was sold at auction for $21,510 by Heritage Auctions in June 2013. The suit had been given to Cincinnati resident Mike Morris by Sanders, who was close to Morris's family. The Morris family house was purchased by Col. Sanders, and Sanders lived with the family for six months. The suit was purchased by Kentucky Fried Chicken of Japan president Masao "Charlie" Watanabe (渡辺 正夫, Watanabe Masao). Watanabe put on the famous suit after placing the winning bid at the auction event in Dallas, Texas.

In 2011, a manuscript of a book on cooking that Sanders apparently wrote in the mid-1960s was found in KFC archives. It includes some cooking recipes from Sanders as well as anecdotes and life lessons. KFC said it was planning to try some of the recipes and to publish the 200-page manuscript online.

In 2010, the Oscar-winning animated short Logorama prominently featured a rotoscoped depiction of Colonel Sanders during the early fast-food restaurant scenes.

=== Charitable giving ===
Before his death, Sanders used his stock holdings to create the Colonel Harland Sanders Charitable Organization, a registered Canadian charity. The wing of Mississauga Hospital for women's and children's care is named The Colonel Harland Sanders Family Care Centre in honor of his substantial donation. Sanders's foundation has also made sizeable donations to other Canadian children's hospitals including the McMaster Children's Hospital, IWK Health Centre, and Stollery Children's Hospital. The Toronto-based foundation disbursed $500,000 to other Canadian charities in 2016, according to its tax return filed with the Canada Revenue Agency.

== Discography ==
- 1967 Christmas Eve with Colonel Sanders (RCA: PRS 256)
- 1968 Christmas Day with Colonel Sanders (RCA: PRS 274)
- 1969 Christmas with Colonel Sanders (RCA: PRS 291)
