= KFC =

American fast food restaurant chain

Coordinates: 38°11′53.0″N 85°41′44.6″W

KFC Corporation
- Logo used since 2026

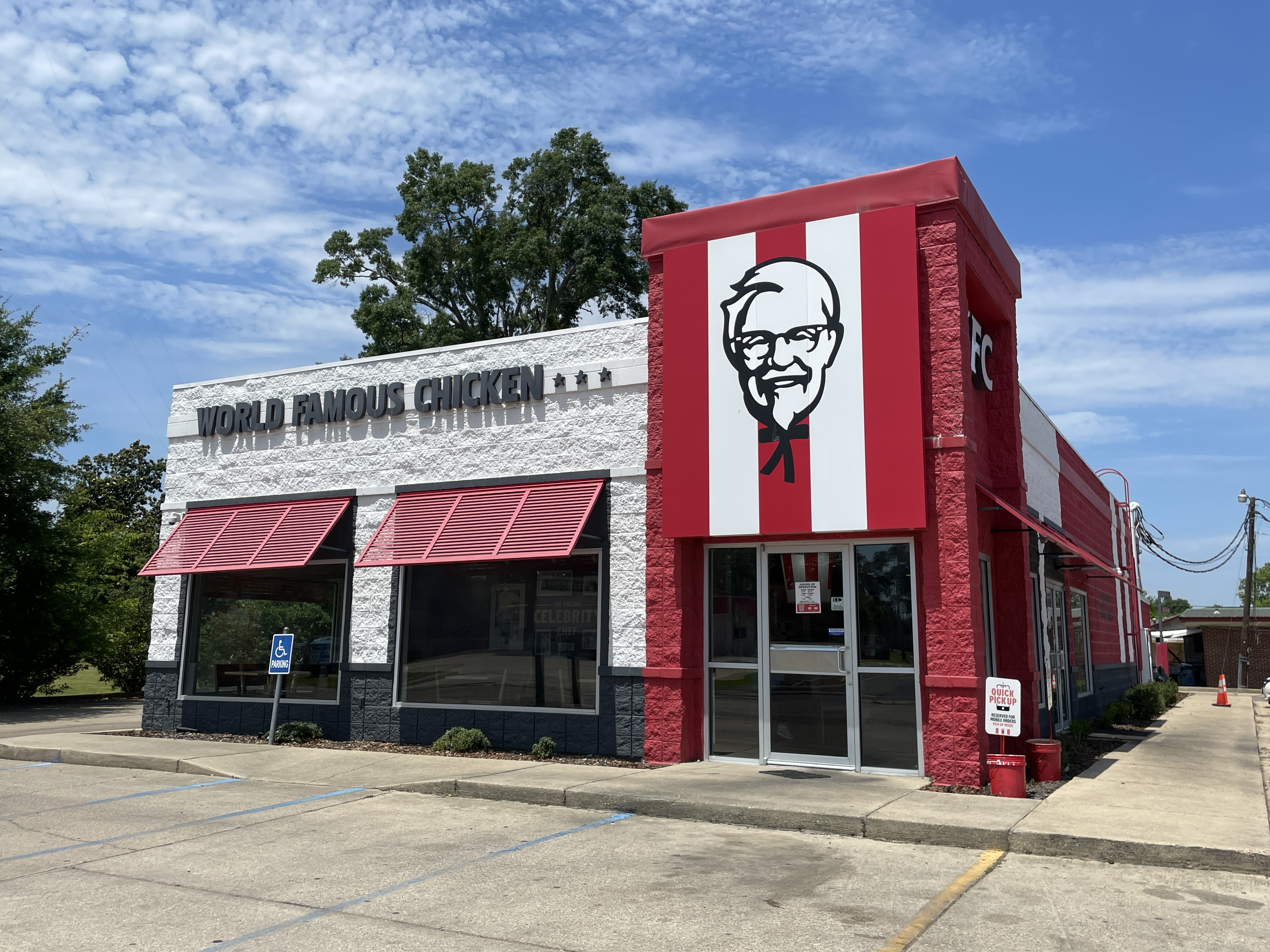
- KFC drive-through restaurant in Tallulah, Louisiana, United States, in 2026
- Trade name: KFC
- Type: Subsidiary
- Industry: Restaurant
- Genre: Fast food
- Founded: Sanders Court & Café: March 20, 1930; 96 years ago North Corbin, Kentucky, U.S.; First franchise: September 24, 1952; 74 years ago South Salt Lake, Utah, U.S.
- Founder: Harland Sanders; Pete Harman
- Headquarters: 7100 Corporate Drive, Plano, Texas, U.S.
- Number of locations: 31,981 (2025)
- Area served: Worldwide (150 countries)
- Key people: Scott Mezvinsky (CEO)
- Products: Fried chicken; chicken burgers; wraps; french fries; soft drinks; milkshakes; salads; desserts; breakfasts
- Revenue: US$2.83 billion (2023)
- Parent: Yum! Brands
- Website: global.kfc.com; www.kfc.com

KFC Corporation, trading as Kentucky Fried Chicken (KFC), is an American multinational fast food restaurant chain specializing in Southern fried chicken and chicken sandwiches. Headquartered in Plano, Texas, it is the world's second-largest restaurant chain (as measured by sales) after McDonald's, with over 31,980 locations globally in 150 countries, as of September 2025. The chain is a subsidiary of Yum! Brands, a restaurant company that also owns the Taco Bell chain.

KFC was founded by Colonel Harland Sanders (1890–1980), an entrepreneur who began selling fried chicken from his roadside restaurant in Corbin, Kentucky, during the Great Depression. Sanders identified the potential of the restaurant-franchising concept, and the first "Kentucky Fried Chicken" franchise opened in South Salt Lake, Utah, in 1952. KFC popularized chicken in the fast-food industry, diversifying the market by challenging the established dominance of the hamburger. By branding himself as "Colonel Sanders", Harland became a prominent figure of American cultural history, and his image remains widely used in KFC advertising to this day. However, the company's rapid expansion overwhelmed the aging Sanders, and he sold it to a group of investors led by John Y. Brown Jr. and Jack C. Massey in 1964.

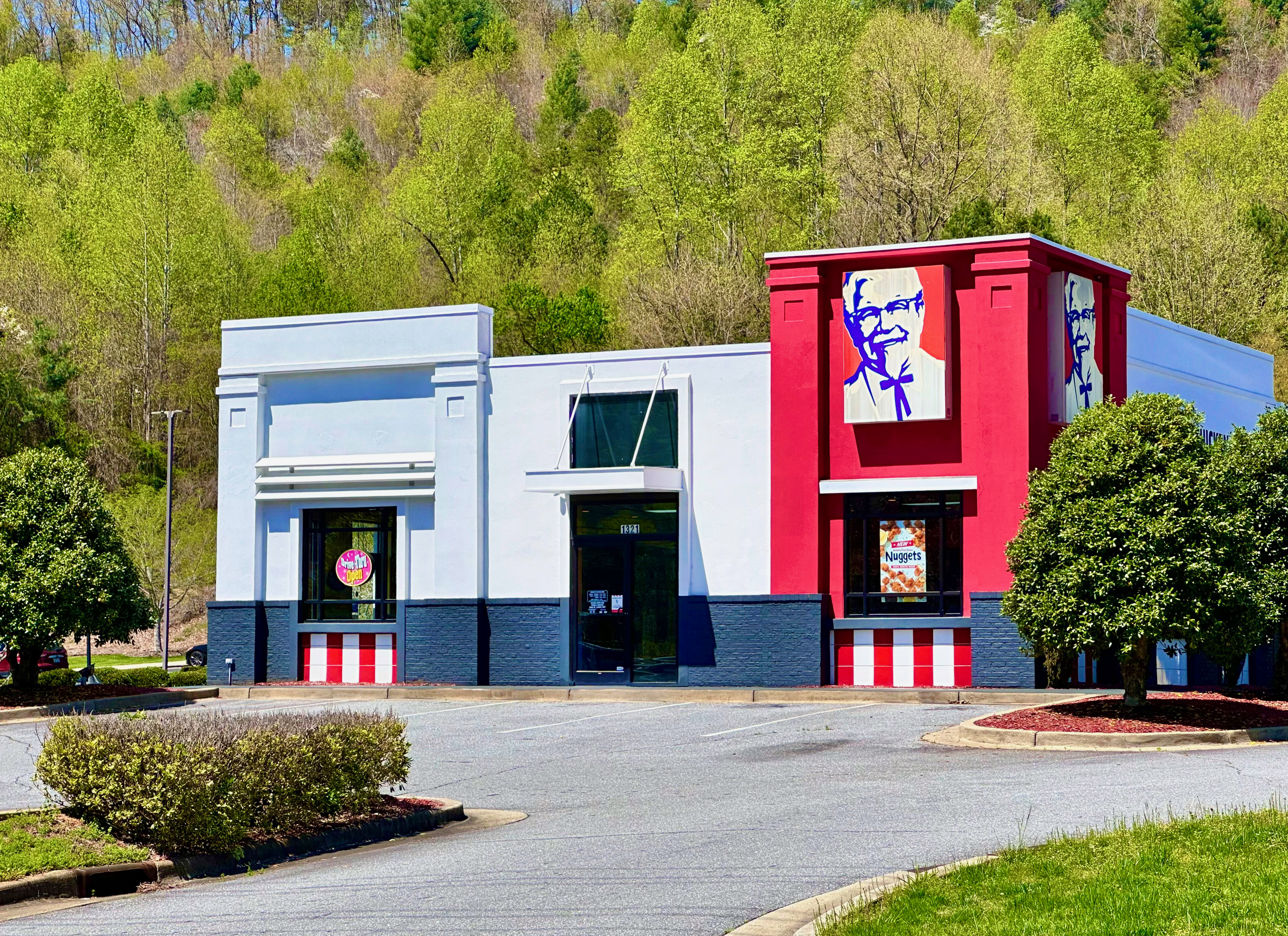
A modern KFC restaurant in Murphy, North Carolina

KFC was one of the first American fast-food chains to expand internationally, opening outlets in Canada, the United Kingdom, Mexico and Jamaica by the mid-1960s. Throughout the 1970s and 1980s, it experienced mixed fortunes domestically, as it went through a series of changes in corporate ownership with little or no experience in the restaurant business. In the early 1970s, KFC was sold to the spirits distributor Heublein, which was taken over by the R. J. Reynolds food and tobacco conglomerate; that company sold the chain to PepsiCo. The chain continued to expand overseas, however, and in 1987 it became the first Western restaurant chain to open in China. It has since expanded rapidly in that country, which is now the company's single largest market. PepsiCo spun off its restaurants division as Tricon Global Restaurants, which later changed its name to Yum! Brands.

KFC's original product is pressure-fried chicken pieces, seasoned with Sanders' signature recipe of "11 herbs and spices". The constituents of the recipe are a trade secret. Larger portions of fried chicken are served in a cardboard "bucket", which has become a feature of the chain since it was first introduced by franchisee Pete Harman in 1957. Since the early 1990s, KFC has expanded its menu to offer other chicken products such as chicken fillet sandwiches and wraps, as well as salads and side dishes such as french fries and coleslaw, desserts and soft drinks; the latter often supplied by PepsiCo. KFC is known for its slogans "It's Finger Lickin' Good!", "Nobody does chicken like KFC", "We do chicken right", and "So good".

== History ==
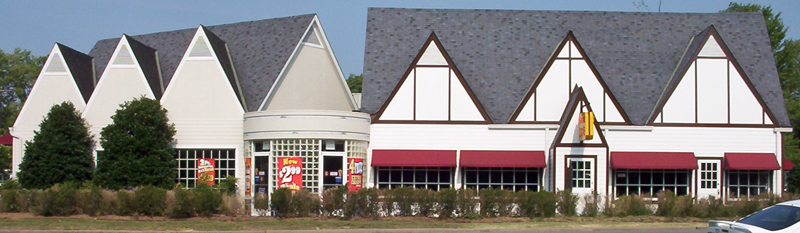
The Harland Sanders Café and Museum in Corbin, Kentucky

=== Sanders Court & Café ===
Harland Sanders was born in 1890 and raised on a farm outside Henryville, Indiana (near Louisville, Kentucky). When Sanders was five years old, his father died, forcing his mother to work at a canning plant. This left Sanders, as the eldest son, to care for his two younger siblings. After he reached seven years of age, his mother taught him how to cook. After leaving the family home at the age of 13, Sanders passed through several professions with mixed success.

In 1930, Sanders took over a Shell filling station on U.S. Route 25 just outside North Corbin, Kentucky, a small town on the edge of the Appalachian Mountains. It was here that he first served to travelers the recipes that he had learned as a child: fried chicken and other dishes such as steaks and country ham. After four years of serving from his own dining room table, Sanders purchased the larger filling station on the other side of the road and expanded to six tables. By 1936, this had proven successful enough for Sanders to be given the honorary title of Kentucky Colonel by Governor Ruby Laffoon. In 1937 he expanded his restaurant to 142 seats and added a motel he purchased across the street, naming it Sanders Court & Café.

Sanders was unhappy with the 35 minutes it took to prepare his chicken in an iron frying pan, but he refused to deep fry the chicken, which he believed lowered the quality of the product. If he pre-cooked the chicken in advance of orders, there was sometimes wastage at day's end. In 1939, the first commercial pressure cookers were released onto the market, mostly designed for steaming vegetables. Sanders bought one and modified it into a pressure fryer, which he then used to fry chicken. The new method reduced production time to be comparable with deep frying while, in the opinion of Sanders, retaining the quality of pan-fried chicken.

=== "Original Recipe" and franchising ===
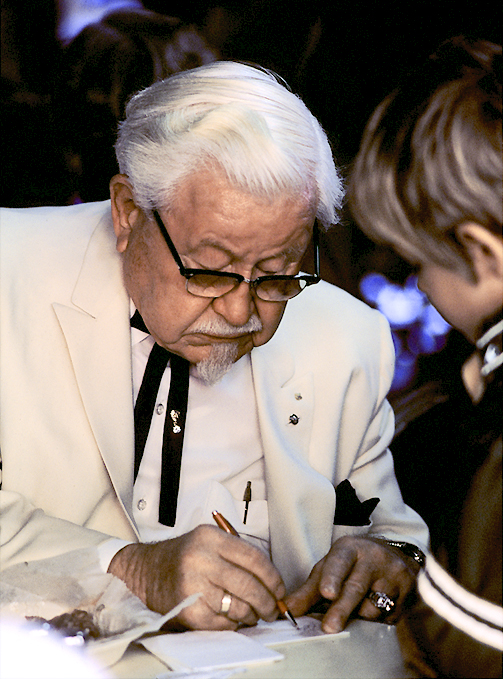
Harland Sanders in character as "the Colonel"

In July 1940, Sanders finalized what came to be known as his "Original Recipe" of 11 herbs and spices. Although he never publicly revealed the recipe, he said the ingredients included salt and pepper and that the rest "stand on everybody's shelf". After being recommissioned as a Kentucky Colonel in 1950 by Governor Lawrence Wetherby, Sanders began to dress the part, growing a goatee, wearing a black frock coat (later switched to a white suit) and a string tie and referring to himself as "the Colonel". His associates went along with the title change, "jokingly at first and then in earnest", according to biographer Josh Ozersky.

In 1952, Sanders franchised his recipe to his friend Pete Harman of South Salt Lake, Utah, the operator of one of the city's largest restaurants. The Sanders Court & Café generally served travelers, so when the route planned in 1955 for Interstate 75 bypassed his properties, Sanders sold them and traveled the US to franchise his recipe to restaurant owners. Independent restaurants would pay four (later five) cents on each chicken as a franchise fee in exchange for Sanders' recipe and the right to feature it on their menus and use his name and likeness for promotional purposes.

Don Anderson, a sign painter hired by Harman, coined the name "Kentucky Fried Chicken". For Harman, the addition of KFC was a way of differentiating his restaurant from competitors; a product from Kentucky was exotic and evoked imagery of Southern hospitality. Harman trademarked the phrase "It's finger lickin' good", which eventually became the company slogan. He also introduced the "bucket meal" in 1957 (14 pieces of chicken, five bread rolls and a pint of gravy in a cardboard bucket). Serving their signature meal in a paper bucket was to become an iconic feature of the company.

By 1963, there were 600 KFC restaurants, making the company the largest fast food operation in the United States. KFC popularized chicken in the fast food industry, diversifying the market by challenging the dominance of the hamburger.

With significant growth in tow, the fledgling Kentucky Fried Chicken decided in 1964 that they would begin offering franchise opportunities beyond the Atlantic, and landed on the United Kingdom as its entry point into Europe. As such, the first British KFC eatery opened its doors at 92 Fishergate in Preston, Lancashire, on May 1, 1965, and still operates today.

Pat Grace met with Sanders at his holiday home near Toronto, Canada, and agreed to franchise the brand in Ireland. In 1970 Grace returned to Ireland after a number of years in Canada to open his first Kentucky Fried Chicken restaurants in Phibsboro shopping center in Dublin. Eventually he opened another six restaurants located in Dublin, Limerick and Cork. After disagreements over cost cutting with KFC management in the early 1980s, the Irish restaurants were renamed to Pat Grace's Famous Fried Chicken reportedly retaining the original recipe. These stores were closed in the late 1980s. Pat Grace went on to wholesale the chicken spice blend under the brand Grace's Perfect Blend.

=== Sale and global expansion ===
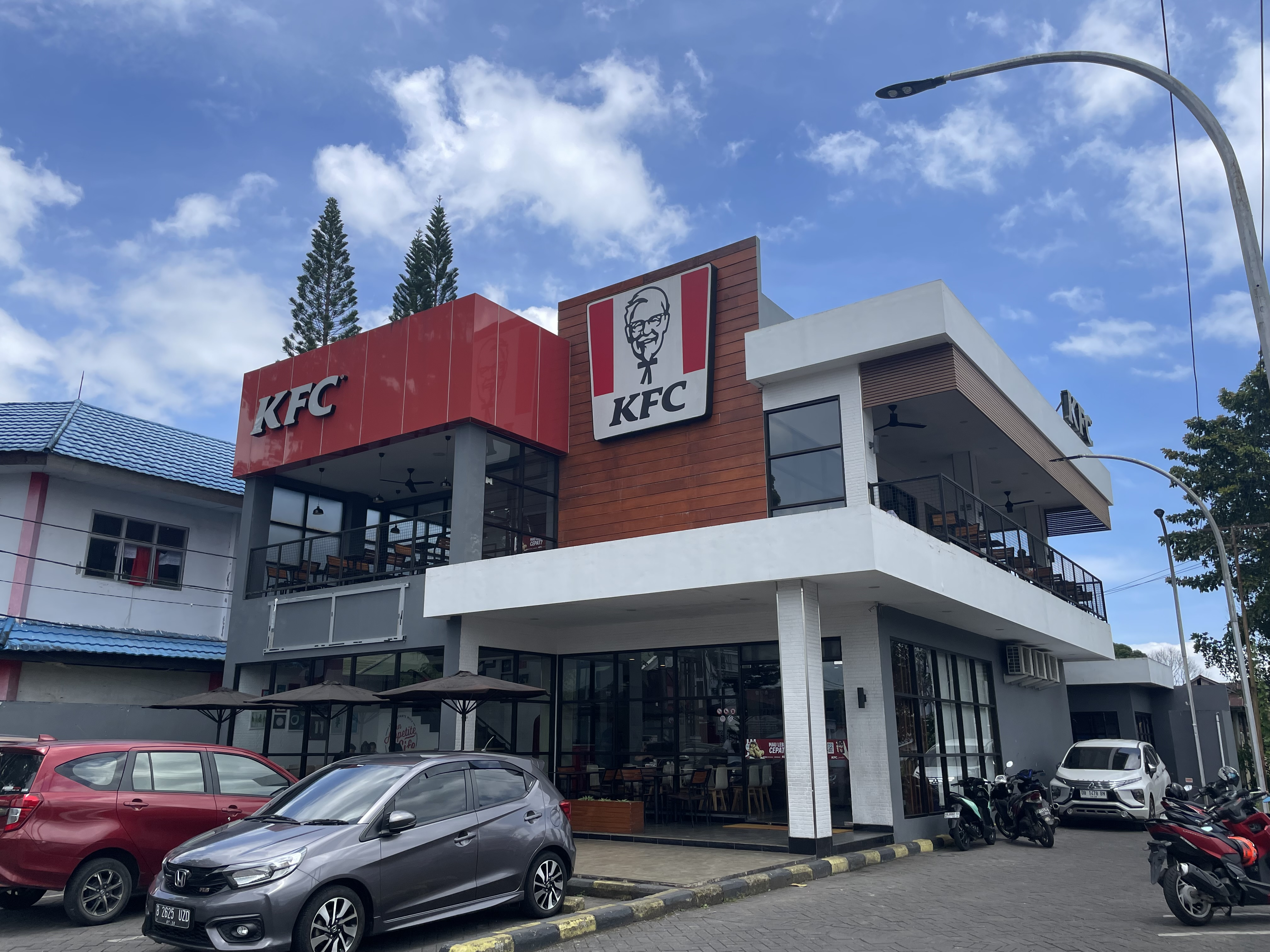
KFC restaurant in Tondano, North Sulawesi

In 1964, Sanders sold KFC to a group of investors led by John Y. Brown Jr. and Jack C. Massey for US$2 million (around US$17 million in 2020). The contract included a lifetime salary for Sanders and the agreement that he would be the company's quality controller and trademark. The chain had reached 3,000 outlets in 48 countries by 1970. In July 1971, Brown sold the company to the Connecticut-based Heublein, a packaged food and drinks corporation, for US$285 million (around US$1.8 billion in 2020). Sanders died in 1980, his promotional work making him a prominent figure in American cultural history. By the time of his death, there were an estimated 6,000 KFC outlets in 48 countries worldwide, with $2 billion worth of sales annually.

In 1982, Heublein was acquired by R. J. Reynolds, the tobacco giant. In July 1986, Reynolds announced the sale of KFC to PepsiCo for $850 million (around US$2.0 billion in 2020). The actual sale took place in early October for $840 million. PepsiCo made the chain a part of its restaurants division alongside Pizza Hut and Taco Bell. KFC entered the Chinese market in November 1987, with an outlet in Beijing.

In 1991, the KFC name was officially adopted, although it had already been widely known by that initialism. Kyle Craig, president of KFC U.S., admitted the change was an attempt to distance the chain from the unhealthy connotations of "fried". The early 1990s saw a number of successful major product launches, including spicy "Hot Wings" (launched in 1990), popcorn chicken (1992) and, internationally, the "Zinger", a spicy chicken fillet sandwich (1993). By 1994 KFC had 5,149 outlets in the US and 9,407 overall, with over 100,000 employees. In August 1997, PepsiCo spun off its restaurants division as a public company valued at US$4.5 billion (around US$7.3 billion in 2020). The new company was named Tricon Global Restaurants and, at the time, had 30,000 outlets and annual sales of US$10 billion (around US$16 billion in 2020), making it second in the world only to McDonald's. Tricon was renamed Yum! Brands in May 2002.

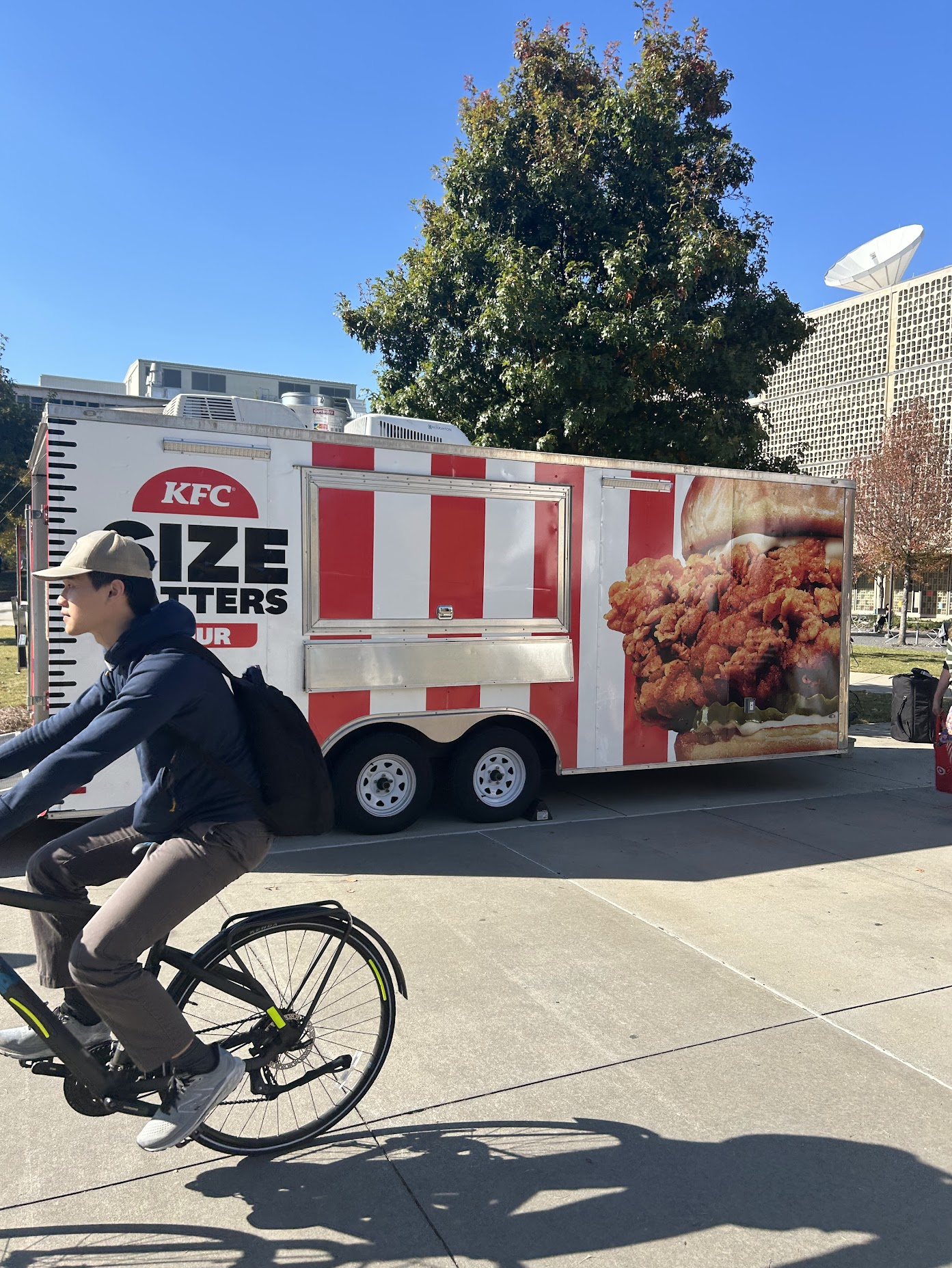
A KFC branded food truck on a university campus in the United States

On March 31, 2011, Priszm, who was the largest franchisee of KFC restaurants in Canada at the time, went into bankruptcy protection in Ontario and British Columbia.

By 2015, KFC was struggling, having lost business to other retailers and being surpassed by Chick-fil-A as the leading chicken retailer in the US three years previously. The company launched a new initiative with a plan to revamp its packaging, decor and uniforms and expand its menu. Additionally, beginning in May 2015, a new series of US advertisements was launched featuring Darrell Hammond as Colonel Sanders. In a planned rotation of actors, Norm Macdonald, Jim Gaffigan, George Hamilton and Rob Riggle portrayed Sanders in similar ads through the fall of 2016. In January 2018, country music icon Reba McEntire played the first female Colonel Sanders.

Before leaving as CEO in 2021, Andrea Zahumensky told Ad Age the "brand assets that we're so lucky to have" were the bucket, the three stripes and the full name Kentucky Fried Chicken. All of these were being used more by the chain.

Australia rebranded KFC back to its original name, "Kentucky Fried Chicken" in 2019.

In June 2026, KFC unveiled a global refresh that included updated visual branding, revised restaurant designs, and new menu offerings across its international operations.

On October 15, 2026, it was announced that KFC in the United States will switch from Pepsi to Coca-Cola starting in January 2027, and to be fully completed by spring.

== Operations ==
Map of countries with KFC franchises as of October 2025

KFC is a subsidiary of Yum! Brands, one of the largest restaurant companies in the world. KFC had sales of $23 billion in 2013. KFC is incorporated under Delaware General Corporation Law, and has its headquarters at 1441 Gardiner Lane, Louisville, Kentucky, in a three-story colonial style building known colloquially as the "White House" due to its resemblance to the US president's home. The headquarters contain executive offices and the company's research and development facilities.

In 2025, Yum! Brands plans to move the KFC headquarters to Plano, Texas.

== Products ==
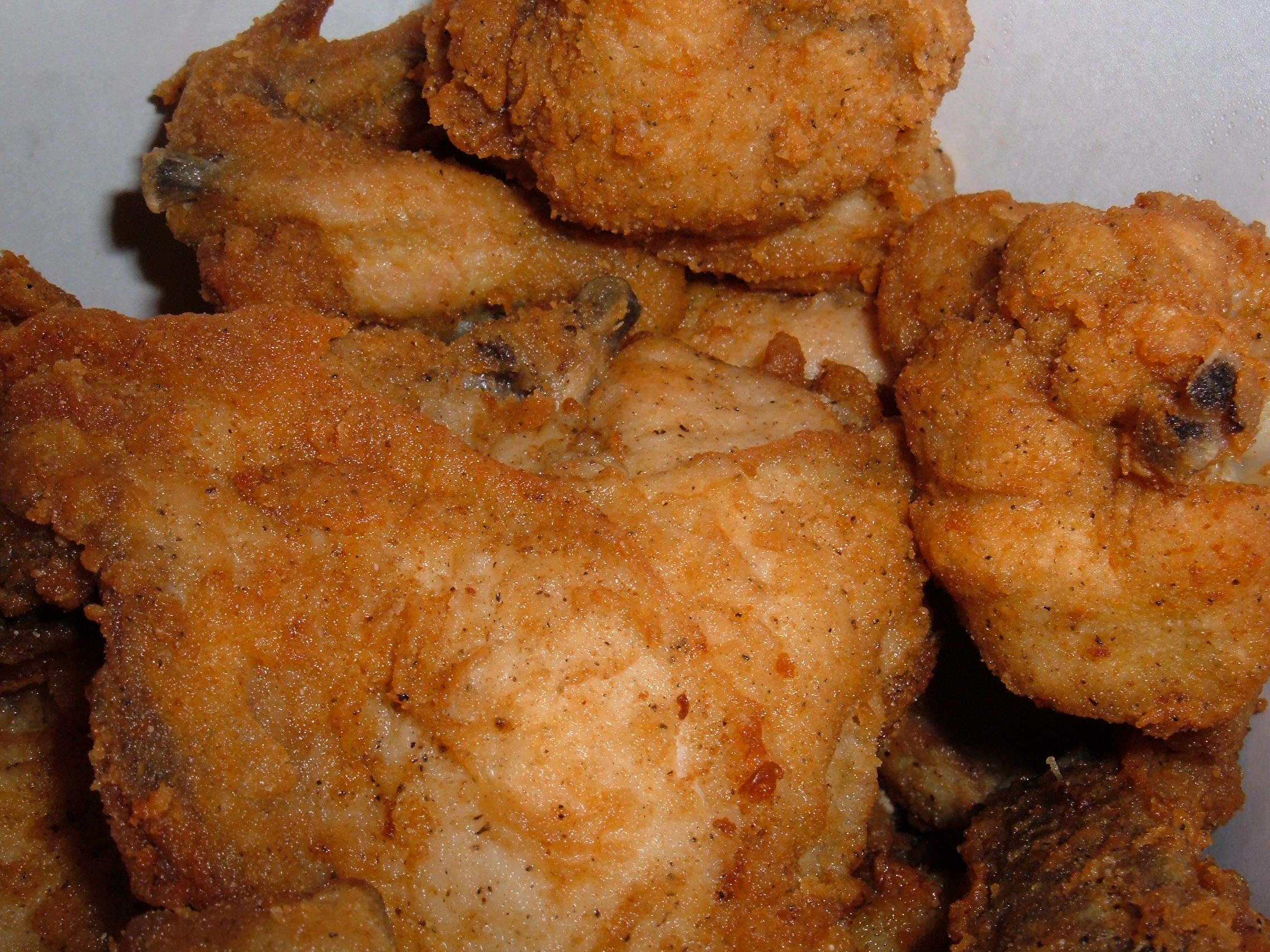
KFC Original Recipe fried chicken

KFC's core product offering is pressure fried on-the-bone chicken pieces seasoned with Colonel Harland Sanders' "Original Recipe" of 11 herbs and spices. The product is typically available in either two- or three-piece individual servings or in a family size cardboard bucket typically holding between six and 16 chicken pieces. In territories that follow the system handed down by Colonel Sanders, such as Canada and the UK, each chicken is divided into nine different cuts (two drumsticks, two thighs, two wings, two breast pieces and one keel); however, the United States now uses an eight-piece cut.

The chicken is hand-breaded at individual KFC outlets with wheat flour mixed with seasoning in a two- to four-minute process. It is then pressure fried for between seven and 10 minutes (the timing differs between countries) in oil at 185 degrees Celsius. Following this, the chicken is left to stand for 5 minutes in order for it to sufficiently cool before it is placed in the warming oven. It is KFC policy to discard chicken if it has not been sold within 90 minutes in order to ensure freshness. The frying oil varies regionally and versions used include sunflower, soybean, rapeseed and palm oil. A KFC executive stated that the taste of the chicken will vary between regions depending on the oil variety used and whether the chicken has been corn-fed or wheat-fed.

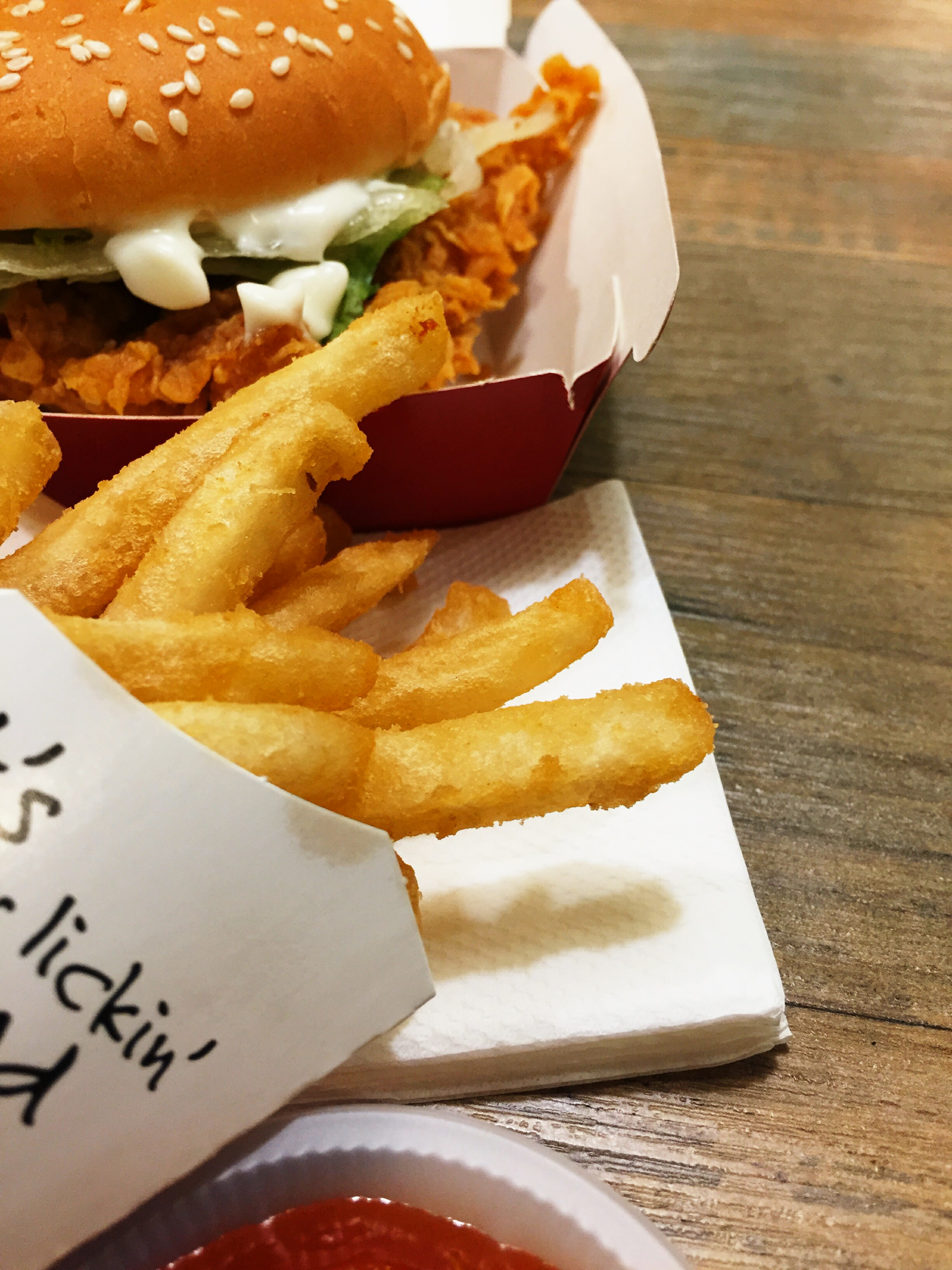
Zinger served with crispy fries and Thai chili sauce in Malaysia

As well as its core chicken on the bone offering, KFC's major products include chicken burgers (including the Zinger and the Tower); wraps ("Twisters" and "Boxmasters"); and a variety of finger foods, including crispy chicken strips and hot wings. Popcorn chicken, which consists of bite-sized pieces of fried chicken, is one of the most widely available KFC products. In some locations, such as in Australia, Belarus, Malaysia and South Africa, chicken nuggets are also sold.

McCormick & Company is KFC's largest supplier of sauces, seasonings and marinades and is a long-term partner in new product development.

Due to the company's previous relationship with PepsiCo, most territories supply PepsiCo products, but exceptional territories include Barbados, Greece, Mexico, New Zealand, the Philippines, Romania, South Africa, Turkey, Indonesia (since 2019), Singapore (since 2022) and Malaysia (since 2022) which stock drinks supplied by The Coca-Cola Company, and Aruba, which stocks RC Cola from the Cott Corporation. In Peru, the locally popular Inca Kola is sold.

Launched in 2009, the Krusher/Krushem range of frozen beverages containing "real bits" such as Kit Kat, Oreo and strawberry shortcake is available in over 2,000 outlets. Egg custard tart is a popular dessert worldwide, but other items include ice cream sundaes and tres leches cake in Peru.

In 2012, the "KFC AM" breakfast menu began to be rolled out internationally, including such items as pancakes, waffles and porridge, as well as fried chicken.

On August 27, 2019, KFC tested meatless boneless wings and nuggets in Atlanta, Georgia.

=== The 11 herbs and spices ===
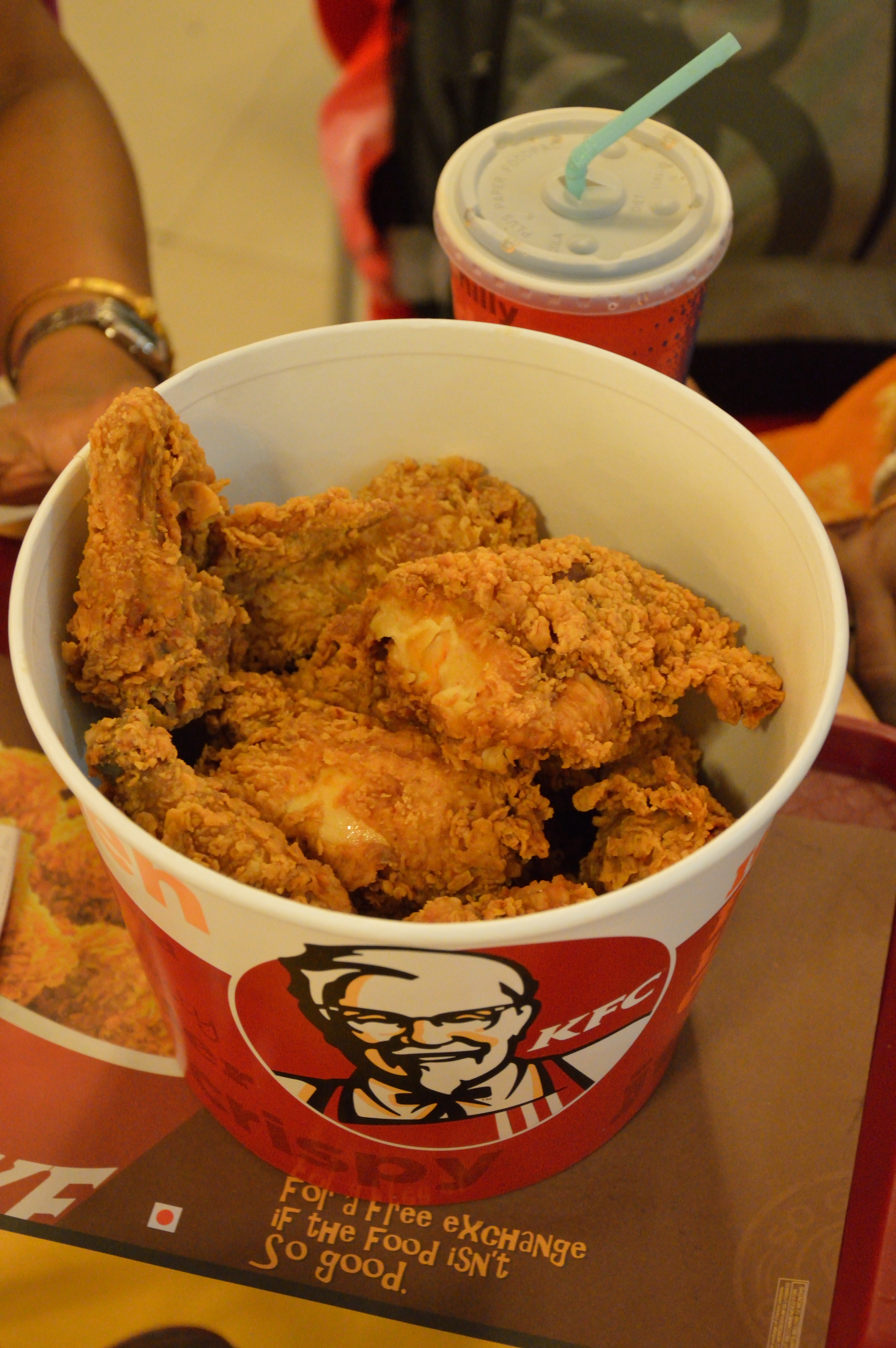
Original Recipe chicken sold in the iconic bucket

Sanders' Original Recipe of "11 herbs and spices" is one of the best known trade secrets in the catering industry. The recipe is not patented, because patent law requires public disclosure of an invention and provides protection only for a strictly limited term, whereas trade secrets can remain the intellectual property of their holders in perpetuity.

A copy of the recipe, signed by Sanders, is held inside a safe inside a vault in KFC's Louisville headquarters, along with 11 vials containing the herbs and spices. To maintain the secrecy of the recipe, half of it is produced by Griffith Laboratories before it is given to McCormick, who add the second half.

In 1999, a couple who bought the house formerly occupied by Colonel Sanders found scribbled notes purported to be the secret recipe. Initially, KFC wanted to file a lawsuit against the couple to stop an auction of the notes but, by early 2001, it dropped the lawsuit, claiming the scribbled notes are "nowhere close" to the original recipe.

Joe Ledington of Kentucky, a nephew by marriage of Colonel Sanders, claimed to have found a copy of the original KFC fried chicken recipe on a handwritten piece of paper in an envelope in a scrapbook. In August 2016, Chicago Tribune staffers conducted a cooking test of this recipe and claimed after a few attempts that, with the addition of the MSG flavor-enhancer Ac'cent, they produced fried chicken which tasted "indistinguishable" from the chicken they purchased at KFC.

=== Regionalized menus ===
KFC adapts its menu internationally to suit regional tastes and there are over 300 KFC menu items worldwide. Some locations, such as the UK and the US, sell grilled chicken. In predominantly Islamic countries, the chicken served is halal. In Asia, there is a preference for spicy foods, such as the Zinger chicken burger. In many international markets, the seasoning used for the core chicken pieces product is available as a hot and spicy version as an alternative to the classic KFC recipe. The hot and spicy coating, as well as having a spicier flavour, also has a crispy consistency. In Bangladesh, India, Nepal and Sri Lanka, a grilled chicken known as "Smoky Red" is available. KFC locations in Taiwan, Hong Kong, Macau and Vietnam offer a roasted option known as Flava Crava. KFC's menu in China includes, among other items incorporating Chinese food items, rice bowls, noodle dishes, and chicken prepared in the style of Peking duck. Some locations in the US sell fried chicken livers and gizzards. A small number of US outlets offer an all-you-can-eat buffet option with a limited menu.

Value menu items are sold under the "Streetwise" name in locations such as Canada, Nigeria, South Africa and Mauritius. Side dishes often include French fries, coleslaw, barbecue baked beans, corn on the cob, mashed potato, bread rolls and American biscuits. Salads include the bean salad, the Caesar salad and the garden salad. In a number of territories, KFC sells onion rings. In most of Asia, several Sub-Saharan Africa and Pacific markets, rice based side dishes are often sold. In Greece and Bulgaria, potato wedges are sold instead of French fries.

In a number of Eastern European locations and Portugal, beer is offered in addition to soft drinks. In 2023 KFC branches in UK and Ireland introduced new 'signature fries' (fries coated in herbs and spice) in an attempt to improve the taste of the fries.

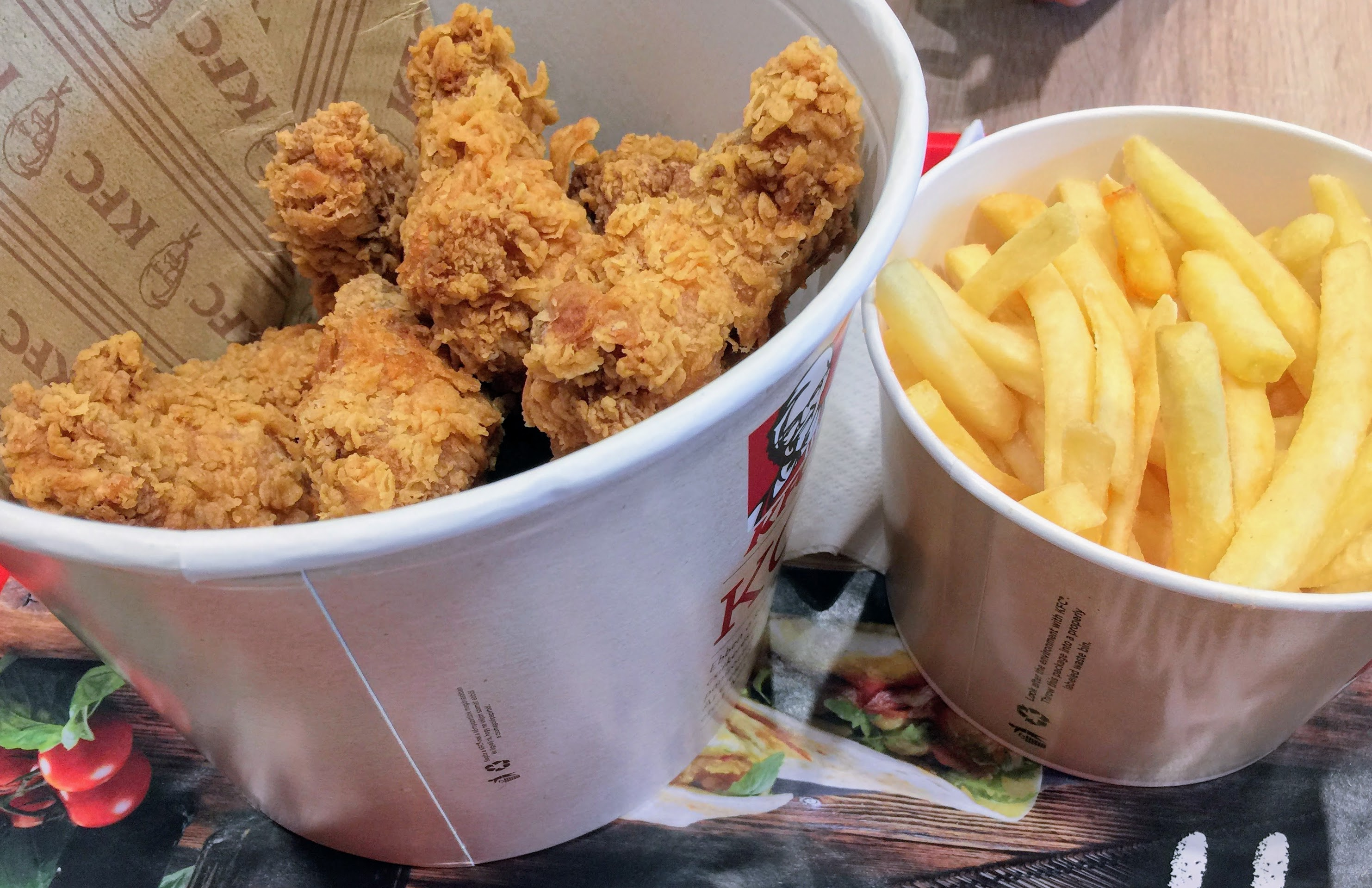
Hot wings and fries served in paper buckets

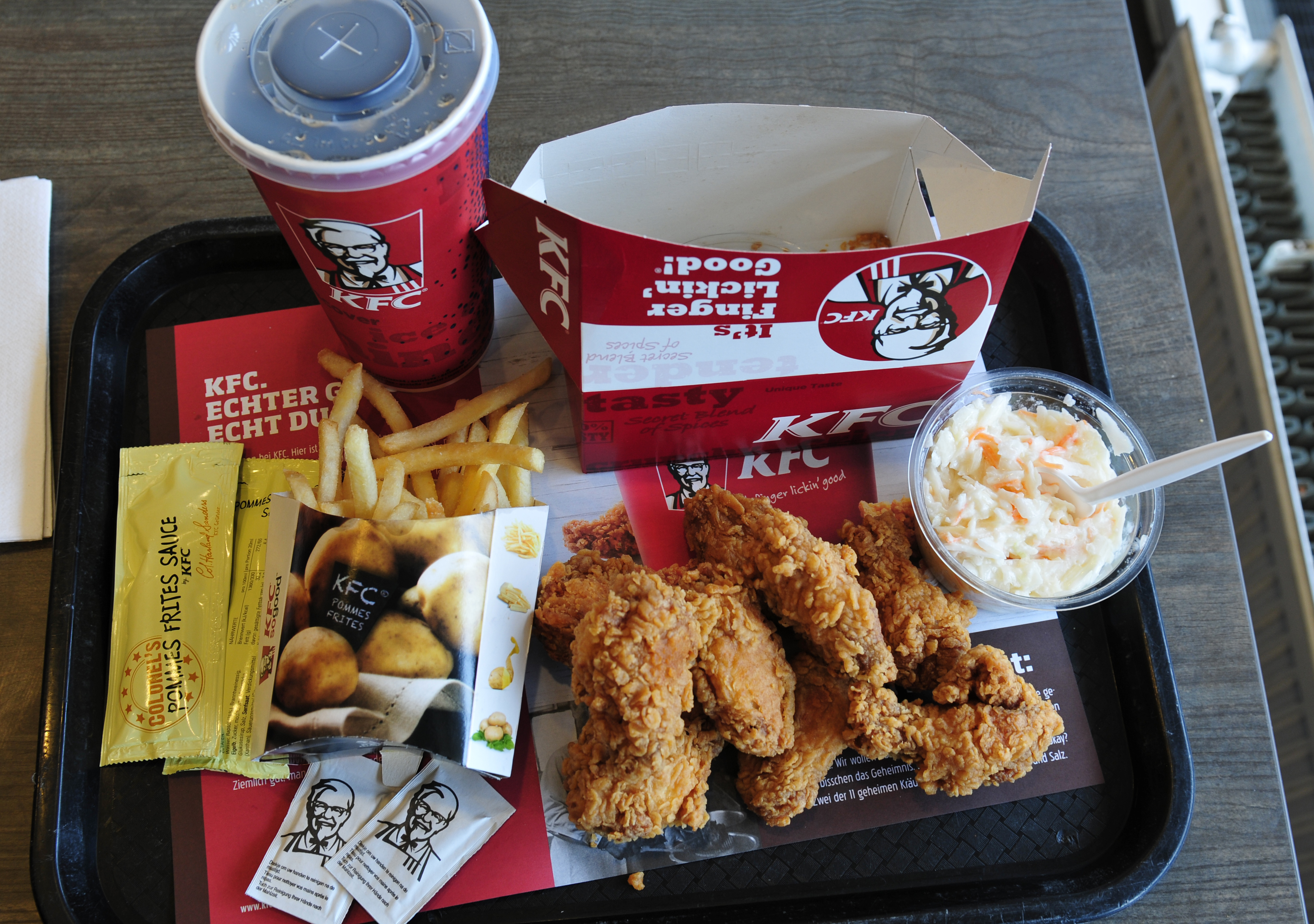
Hot wings menu set sold in Berlin

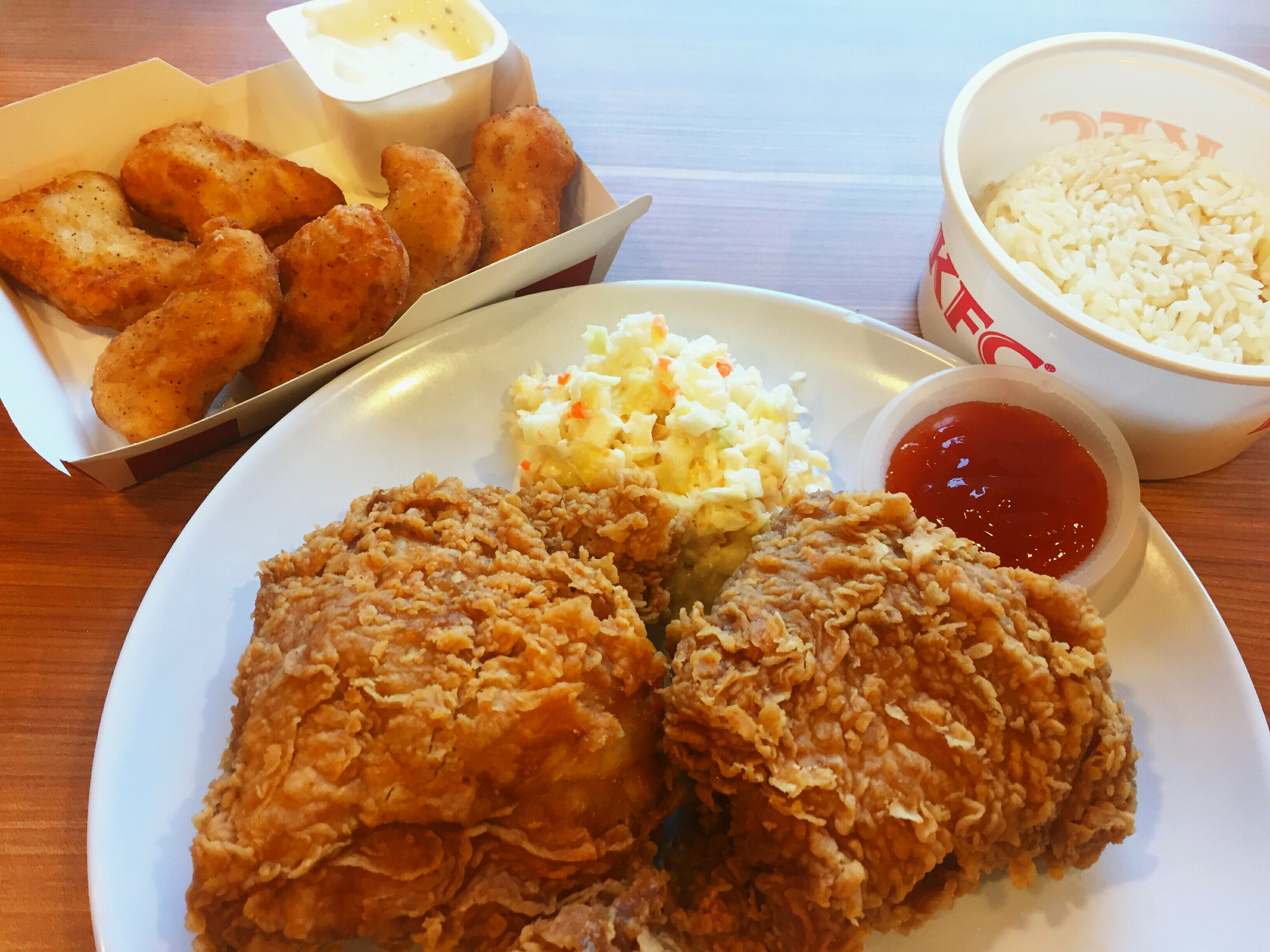
Hot & spicy chicken, colonel rice, coleslaw and nuggets in Malaysia

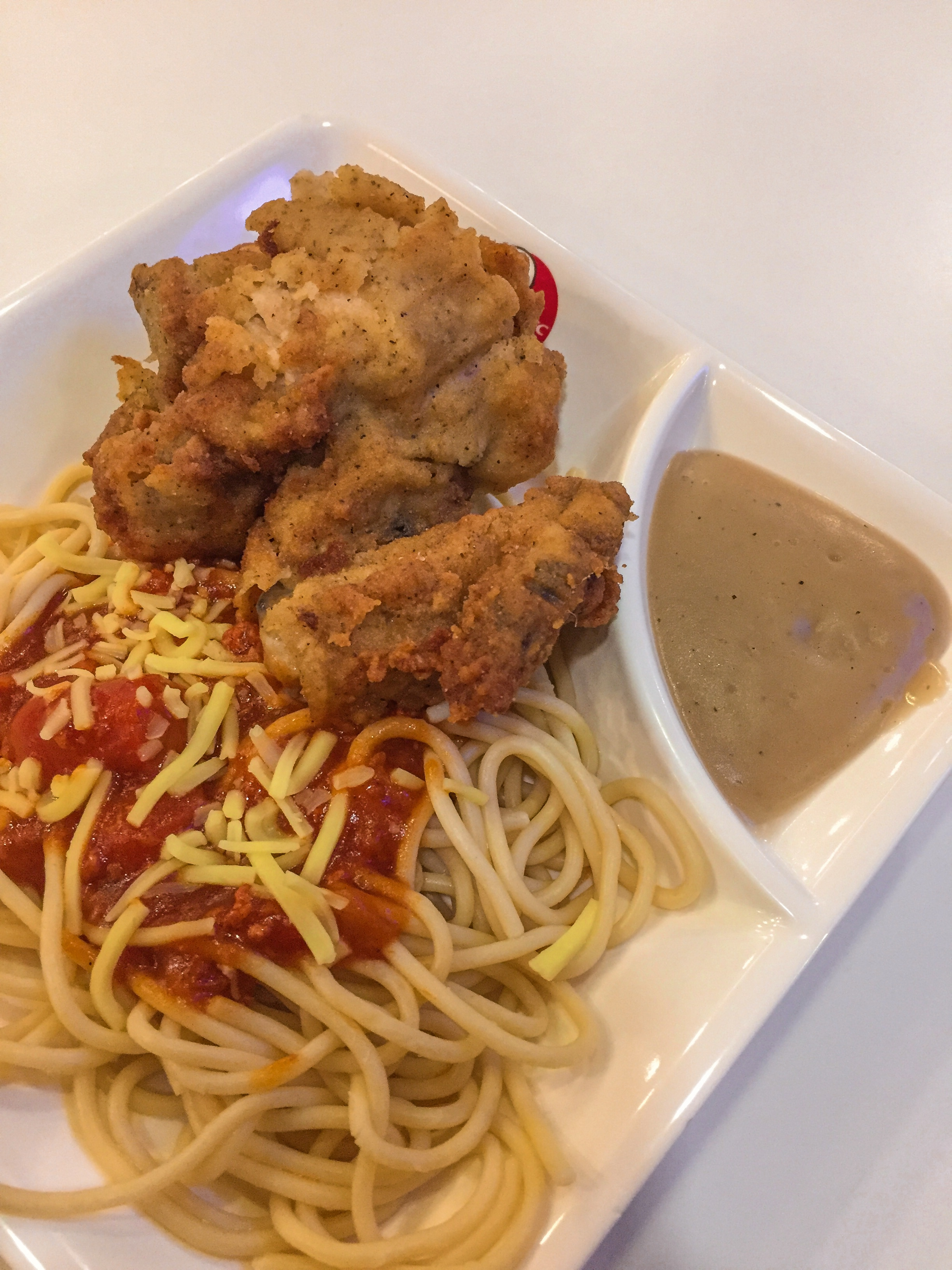
Spaghetti and gravy as sold in the Philippines

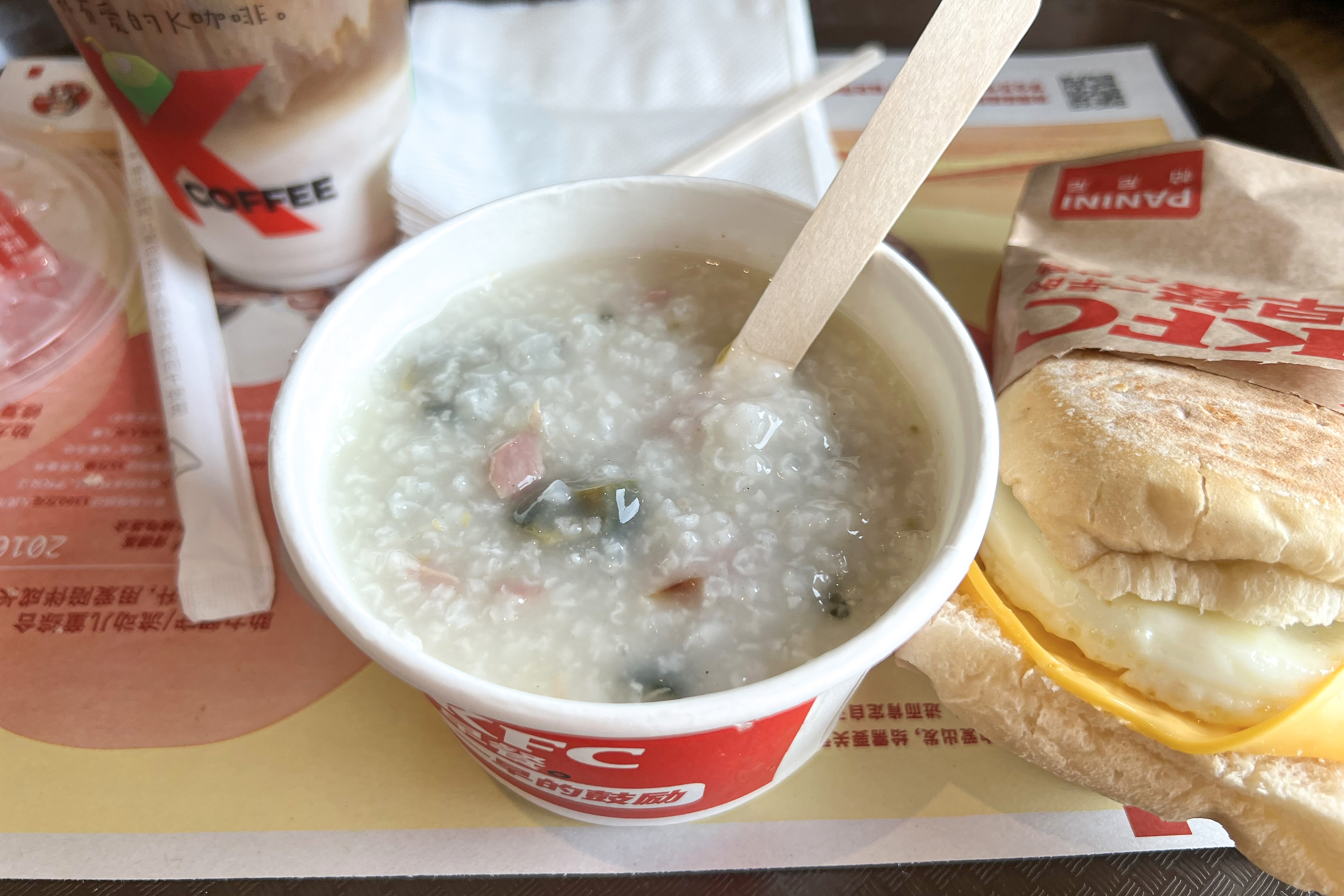
KFC century eggs and pork congee sold in China in breakfast hours only

=== Equipment ===
KFC initially used stove-top covered cooking pots to fry its chicken. In the 1960s, the officially recommended model was the L S Hartzog developed "KFC 20-Head Cooker", a large device that cost $16,000. The Hartzog model had no oil filtration system, meaning that filtering had to be done manually, and the pressure fryers occasionally exploded often harming employees. In 1969, inventor and engineer Winston L. Shelton developed the "Collectramatic" pressurized fryer to overcome the problems KFC faced in quickly frying chicken to meet growing customer demand. The Collectramatic used precision time and temperature controls and self-filtered the cooking oil – all while meeting Colonel Sanders' high standards. Fred Jeffries, then vice president of purchasing at KFC, claimed that the invention helped fuel the company's rapid expansion and success:

There's no way it (KFC) could have grown as it did without the Collectramatic. Stores were doing about $200,000 a year in sales on average with the pots...but they could never have done the $900,000 a year it became without Win's fryer. He (Shelton) helped set the stage for that with true engineering thinking.

Although a number of franchisees bought the Collectramatic, which had the support of Colonel Sanders from 1970 onwards, John Y. Brown Jr. had given tacit approval to franchisees to exclusively use the older L S Hartzog fryer, saying "Though those old pots were damn dangerous, at least we knew they worked! I was mostly afraid these new fryers would break down in the middle of business." Brown warned franchisees that they were in violation of their contract if they used the Collectramatic. Brown held his ground on the issue until he learned that his father, John Y. Brown Sr., who owned multiple KFC franchises, was successfully using the Collectramatic in every franchise he owned. The issue was eventually resolved after Heublein purchased KFC, acquired Hartzog and nullified the contract. The Collectramatic has been an approved pressure fryer for KFC from 1972 onwards.

From 2013 onwards, KFC has been transitioning from using Collectramatic cookers to pressure fryers produced by Henny Penny, which supplies KFC with various equipment. The 'Velocity' series of pressure fryers includes increased load capacity, automatic oil filtration and increased oil longevity.

== Advertising ==
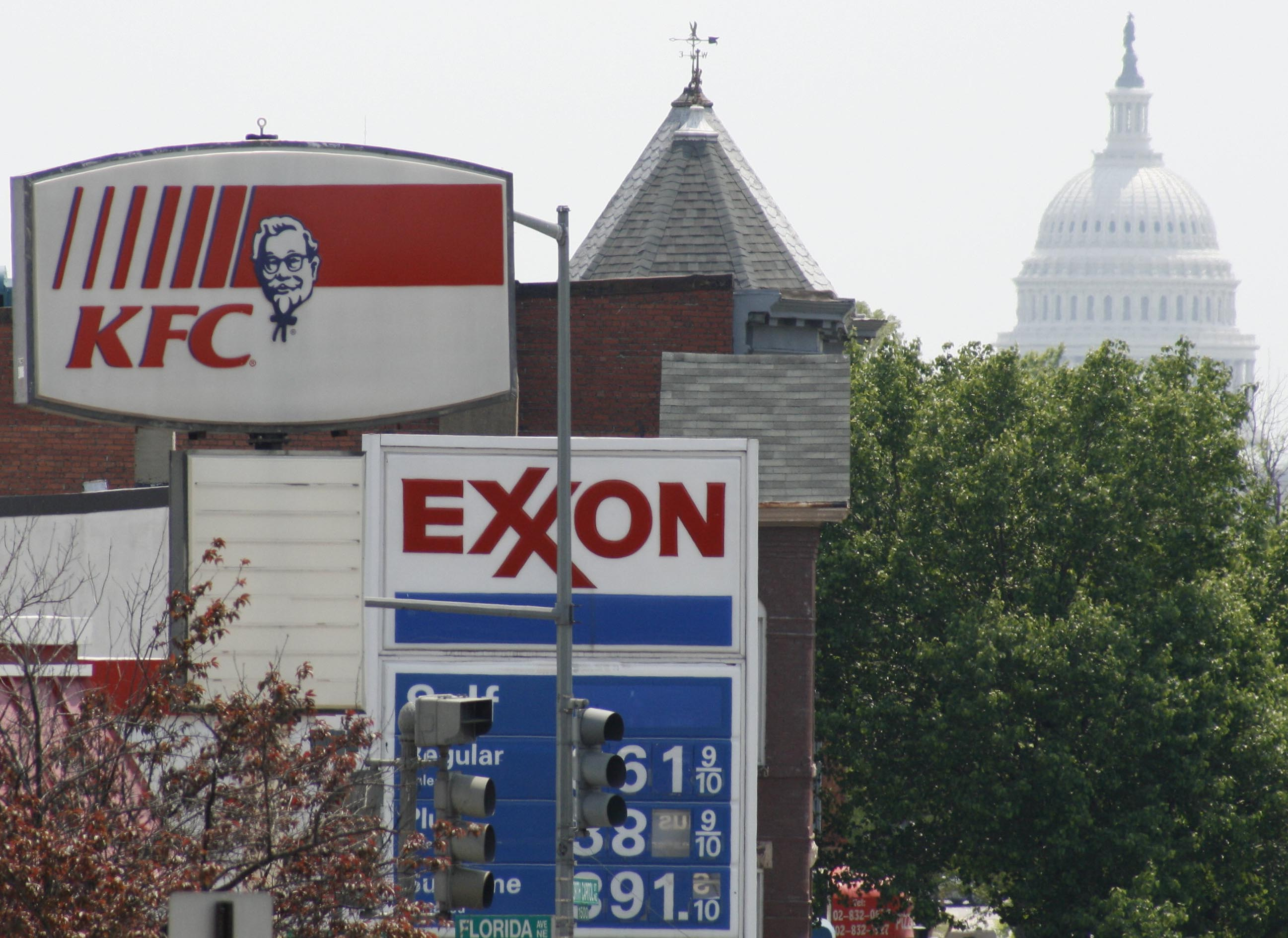
A KFC sign in front of a restaurant in Washington, D.C.

Colonel Sanders was a key component of KFC advertising until his death in 1980. Despite his death, Sanders remains a key icon of the company as an "international symbol of hospitality". Early official slogans for the company included "North America's Hospitality Dish" (from 1956) and "We fix Sunday dinner seven nights a week". The "finger lickin' good" slogan was used from 1956 and went on to become one of the best-known slogans of the 20th century. The trademark expired in the US in 2006. The first KFC logo was introduced in 1952 and featured a "Kentucky Fried Chicken" typeface and a logo of the Colonel. In 1962, Dave Thomas took Colonel Sanders' bucket and turned it into a sign that revolved in a circular motion in front of almost every American KFC outlet.

Advertising played a key role at KFC after it was sold by Sanders and the company began to advertise on US television with a budget of US$4 million in 1966. In order to fund nationwide advertising campaigns, the Kentucky Fried Chicken Advertising Co-Op was established, giving franchisees 10 votes and the company three when deciding on budgets and campaigns. In 1969, KFC hired its first national advertising agency, Leo Burnett. A notable Burnett campaign in 1972 was the "Get a bucket of chicken, have a barrel of fun" jingle, performed by Barry Manilow. By 1976, KFC was one of the largest advertisers in the US.

== Controversies and criticism ==
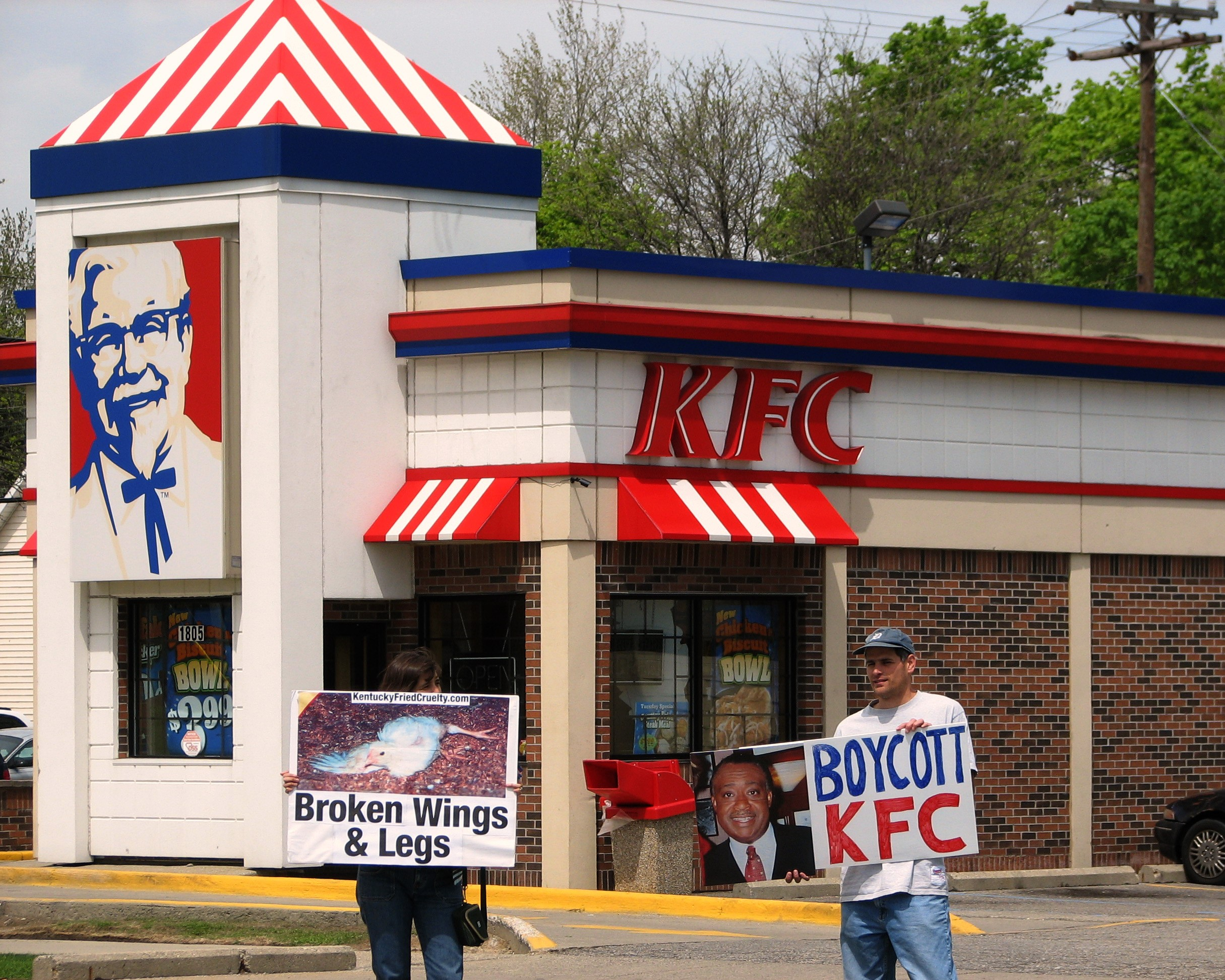
Protesters demonstrating outside a KFC restaurant in Royal Oak, Michigan (2007)

Since the beginning of the 21st century, fast food has been criticized for its animal welfare record, its links to obesity and its environmental impact. Eric Schlosser's book Fast Food Nation (2002) and Morgan Spurlock's film Super Size Me (2004) reflected these concerns. Since 2003, People for the Ethical Treatment of Animals (PETA) has protested KFC's choice of poultry suppliers worldwide. The exception is KFC Canada, which signed an agreement pledging to only use "animal-friendly" suppliers. President of KFC's US division Gregg Dedrick said PETA mischaracterized KFC as a poultry producer rather than a purchaser of chickens. In 2008, Yum! stated: "[As] a major purchaser of food products, [Yum!] has the opportunity and responsibility to influence the way animals supplied to us are treated. We take that responsibility very seriously, and we are monitoring our suppliers on an ongoing basis."

In 2006, Greenpeace accused KFC Europe of sourcing the soya bean for its chicken feed from Cargill, which had been accused of clearing large swathes of the Amazon rainforest in order to grow the crop.

In 2010, according to The Guardian, "in the US where fried chicken remains closely associated with age-old racist stereotypes about black people in the once segregated south", KFC Australia aired the 30-second promotion on television named "KFC's cricket survival guide" which shows a white cricket fan surrounded by black fans from the opposing team. The television announcer asks, "Need a tip when you're stuck in an awkward situation?" The fan passes around his "bucket of KFC", even though the commercial was intended for an Australian audience, which found its way to social media in the United States, prompting sharp disapproval. KFC Australia made a statement to the fact the commercial was "misinterpreted by a segment of people in the US" and it was a "light-hearted reference to the West Indian cricket team" and "The ad was reproduced online in the US without KFC's permission, where we are told a culturally-based stereotype exists, leading to the incorrect assertion of racism...We unequivocally condemn discrimination of any type and have a proud history as one of the world's leading employers for diversity".

In May 2012, Greenpeace accused KFC of sourcing paper pulp for its food packaging from Indonesian rainforest wood. Independent forensic tests showed that some packaging contained more than 50 percent mixed tropical hardwood fiber, sourced from Asia Pulp & Paper (APP). APP said such fiber can be found in recycled paper, or: "It can also come from tree residues that are cleared, after a forest area has become degraded, logged-over or burned, as part of a sustainable development plan. APP has strict policies and practices in place to ensure that only residues from legal plantation development on degraded or logged-over forest areas and sustainable wood fiber enters the production supply chain." KFC said: "From a global perspective, 60 percent of the paper products that Yum! (our parent company) sources are from sustainable sources. Our suppliers are working towards making it 100 percent."

In December 2012, the chain was criticized in China when it was discovered that a number of KFC suppliers had been using growth hormones and an excessive amount of antibiotics on its poultry in ways that violated Chinese law. In February 2013, Yum! CEO David Novak admitted that the scandal had been "longer lasting and more impactful than we ever imagined". The issue is of major concern to Yum!, which earns almost half of its profits from China, largely through the KFC brand. In March 2013, Yum! reported that sales had rebounded in February, but that lower sales in December and January would result in a decline in same-store sales of 20 percent in the first quarter.

In 2017, KFC was fined £950,000 after two workers in the UK were scalded by boiling hot gravy. The company admitted to charges of failing in a duty of care to employees and was ordered by Teesside Crown Court in Middlesbrough to pay fines of £800,000 and £150,000.

In February 2018, logistics mismanagement by DHL, which had been selected by KFC UK as their new delivery partner, caused a chicken shortage in the United Kingdom – KFC's largest market in Europe – forcing the company to temporarily close hundreds of restaurants around the country. KFC apologized by taking out adverts in British newspapers showing the company's initials rearranged to read "FCK", followed by an apology, which was well received.

In November 2021, Finland's first KFC restaurant was opened at the Itis shopping center in Itäkeskus, Helsinki. A few days before the opening day, a tent had appeared in front of the restaurant, where a man who had kept his identity secret for a few days had stayed, and who on the opening day revealed himself to the public as a vegan activist defending animal rights. After trying to give his speech to those present, the security company carried him away. Even before the opening of the restaurant, in October, news of a controversy over the procurement of a broiler for food from Poland; the cause is mainly related to the risk of salmonella in broilers, which is a significant problem in Poland, whereas its prevalence in Finland is low.

Following the 2022 Russian invasion of Ukraine, a number of companies have faced growing pressure to halt operations in Russia but have not yet done so. This includes KFC, which has over 1,000 outlets in Russia, more than any other Western fast food chain. However, within a few years, all Russian KFC restaurants were rebranded as "Rostic's".

In early 2022 a promotional video was shot with influencer Niko Omilana showing a chicken farm in the KFC supply chain. The video depicted birds with a good quality of life. Animal rights activists, working on behalf of the vegan food brand VFC, entered the same farm months later and allegedly found vastly different conditions, with instances of "severe overcrowding" and "lame and dead birds". A spokesperson for the Moy Park meat company who operated the farm said: "Claims such as these are treated incredibly seriously and we immediately reviewed the footage along with independent audits and veterinary reports. This farm is managed to a very high standard and our preliminary findings show that it is meeting those standards."

On November 9, 2022, KFC Germany issued an announcement inviting its German audience to celebrate Kristallnacht with "Cheesy Chicken". An apology was issued shortly afterwards, blaming the original message as an "error in our system".

In May 2024, the closure of the outlet in Malaysia was reported due to the ongoing Israeli–Palestinian conflict. Attacks on two outlets in Baghdad, Iraq were also reported.

In September 2024, KFC announced that it would not meet the Better Chicken Commitment, an animal welfare pledge made in 2019. The commitment includes several welfare standards, such as adopting slower-growing breeds by 2026, but as of 2024, only 1% of KFC's chickens were from such breeds.

In June 2025, KFC temporarily closed all its 11 restaurants in Denmark and dismissed its franchise holder in the country, after a TV show (broadcast on June 23) revealed that in multiple restaurants, employees were systematically falsifying ("extending") use-by dates on raw chicken, and possibly other problems. Before broadcast, the questions by the TV reporter caused the national food authority to launch simultaneous inspection raids on all 11 restaurants. None got an all-clear, seven received strict warnings and four were given punishments (fines/charges or forced instant closure). Among the issues found by the authorities were moldy residue in multiple restaurants; a common procedure of reusing the breading mix continuously instead of using fresh breading mix every three hours, as stated in written procedures that were hastily changed during the raids (some inspections only saw the new procedure, which they found dubious); a common thawing procedure (with no written risk assessment documentation) for raw chicken which would allow chicken to be served up to four days after the start of defrosting and made it difficult to confirm the actual age of the raw chicken; and suspect messages between restaurant bosses and the national franchise holder about deceiving inspectors from both the government and KFC Western Europe. Furthermore, various formal and legal issues were found in multiple restaurants, such as dirty waste buckets too close to fresh food, parts of operations done under the company ID of the parent company instead of the actual restaurant as registered with food safety authorities, and incomplete paperwork on deliveries.

In September 2025, Czech journalist Jan Tuna reported that the practices of artificially extending the shelf life of meat that led to the closure of all KFC outlets in Denmark may also be used by some branches in the Czech Republic. He cited the testimony of a former employee from the Jablonec nad Nisou branch. The State Agricultural and Food Inspection Authority later revealed that similar practices were used by the KFC outlet in Liberec. The inspection subsequently decided to carry out mass inspections of KFC restaurants throughout the country. In November the spokesperson of the State Agricultural and Food Inspection Authority revealed that employees of the KFC outlet in Prague-Dejvice defrosted chicken meat in standing water, which increases microbiological risks.

== See also ==
- Cuisine of the Southern United States
- List of chicken restaurants
- List of fast food restaurant chains
- List of major employers in Louisville, Kentucky
- KFC in China
- KFC in Japan
