= 1983 Kentucky gubernatorial election =

- November 8, 1983
- Turnout: 56.2%
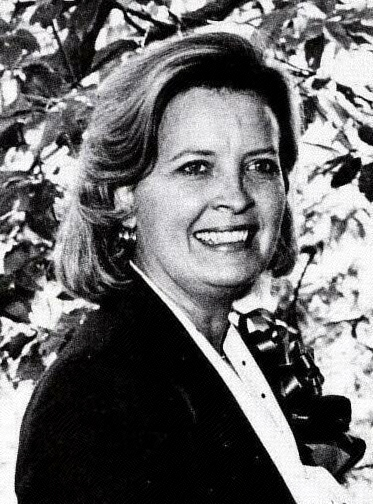

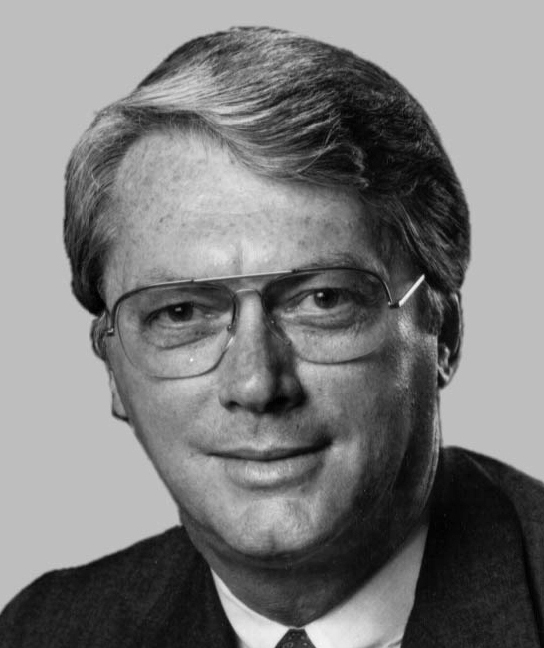
Nominee	Martha Layne Collins	Jim Bunning
Party	Democratic	Republican
Popular vote	561,674	454,650
Percentage	54.50%	44.11%
- Collins: 40–50% 50–60% 60–70% 70–80% Bunning: 40–50% 50–60% 60–70% 70–80%
Governor before election
John Y. Brown Jr.
Democratic
Elected Governor
Martha Layne Collins
Democratic

The 1983 Kentucky gubernatorial election was held on November 8, 1983. Democratic nominee Martha Layne Collins defeated Republican nominee Jim Bunning with 54.50% of the vote, replacing outgoing governor John Y. Brown Jr., and becoming the first female governor of Kentucky.

== Primary elections ==
Primary elections were held on May 24, 1983.

=== Democratic primary ===
==== Candidates ====
- Martha Layne Collins, incumbent Lieutenant Governor
- Harvey I. Sloane, Mayor of Louisville
- W. Grady Stumbo, former Secretary of the Kentucky Cabinet for Human Resources
- Ray Adkins
- Doris Shuja Binion
- Fifi Rockefeller

The Democratic race for governor was seen as a race among three major candidates. The most prominent of these candidates was Lieutenant Governor Martha Layne Collins, who had been seen as a likely candidate since she took office. With the exception of the incumbent Governor John Y. Brown Jr., the previous two Democratic governors had been Lieutenant Governors. Collins appealed to local Democratic leaders alienated by Governor Brown and his neglectful attitude towards party affairs. She focused her campaign less on issues, but more on her experience, and her visiting all of the state's 120 counties during her tenure. She also spent close $2.5 million on television advertising, more than any other candidate.

As early as 1980, Louisville mayor Harvey Sloane, would also emerge as a strong potential competitor. Sloane was the runner-up for the nomination in 1979, losing in a race so close, that he did not concede defeat until two days had passed. He had the perception of being a frontrunner, and thus was able to win over institutional support, in addition to keeping his base in Jefferson County. In 1979, Sloane ran as a liberal candidate, earning backing from unions and teachers. For his second bid, he courted the support of business groups and pro-life groups. Polls early in the race showed a close contest, with Sloane leading in northern Kentucky, and Collins running strongest in Western Kentucky and among women.

For most of the campaign, the battle was waged amongst the two frontrunners. Collins faced charges she was too soft to be governor and tried to counter them by emphasizing a tough on crime plan. She also faced sustained criticism from Sloane for using taxpayer funds during campaigning, such as having state police drive her to events, and hosting supporters in the Lieutenant Governor's mansion. At the end of April, the race remained close with Sloane only narrowly ahead of Collins in polls.

A third contender would emerge in the home stretch of the campaign: W. Grady Stumbo, a former state cabinet official and a doctor. Stumbo's campaign was seen as heavily populist, earning endorsements from labor unions. He also focused on his opposition to a right-to-work law and working for coal mining interests. He was also noted for being a compelling speaker, performing well in debates. In spite of this, he was merely a third place contender, lagging heavily behind the two frontrunners in fundraising and polling, largely being viewed as an underdog. However, he saw his fortunes turn around in the final days when Governor Brown endorsed his campaign, as a response to what he saw as the other candidates talking "...about going back to the old patronage system...". With a large polling deficit, and a large number of undecided voters, the endorsement from Brown gave Stumbo last minute momentum, generating uncertainty as to who would win in the end.

==== Results ====
The race ended up being close, but Collins would pull out by an exceptionally narrow margin. Sloane refused to concede the race for nearly a month after, until a recanvas showed the outcome would not change. Sloane's loss was attributed to several key factors. One was his decision to run for a second term as Mayor of Louisville, which denied him crucial time to campaign for the job of Governor, in addition to implicating him in controversies. More pertinently, his shift to the right this campaign, particularly waffling on whether he'd sign a right-to-work law and courting pro-life voters cost him with key Democratic groups who were disappointed by his shift. He also was seen as a weak speaker. Stumbo, meanwhile, performed best in Eastern Kentucky and among union voters, but lacked a strong county level organization and struggled with finances.

Democratic primary results
Party	Candidate	Votes	%
Democratic	Martha Layne Collins	223,692	33.97
Democratic	Harvey I. Sloane	219,160	33.28
Democratic	W. Grady Stumbo	199,795	30.34
Democratic	Ray Adkins	9,445	1.43
Democratic	Doris Shuja Binion	3,501	0.53
Democratic	Fifi Rockefeller	2,861	0.44
Total votes		658,454	100.00

=== Republican primary ===
==== Candidates ====
- Jim Bunning, State Senate minority leader
- Lester H. Burns Jr., attorney
- Don Wiggins Jr.
- Elizabeth Bette Wickham
- Thurman Jerome Hamlin
- Ben Auxier Jr.

Whereas the Democratic race was hard-fought amongst credible challengers, the Republican side was far less notable. Republicans faced difficulty recruiting candidates this year, with their presence in the legislature at a lower point than it had been for years. However, they did manage to recruit Jim Bunning, the State Senate minority leader, who had initially declined to run. He received support from the state and national party, and faced only token opposition. But even amidst this seemingly unified front, there were troubles internally. Bunning refused to commit to not run for U.S. Senate in 1984, drawing the ire of the state's other prominent Republican Mitch McConnell, who had been planning to seek the seat. Furthermore, the state's sole Republican governor since 1967, Louie Nunn, admitted that Bunning could not speak to voters as well as Lester Burns, and that he did not sufficiently support Republicans, including Nunn's own comeback bid in, 1979.

==== Results ====
Republican primary results
Party	Candidate	Votes	%
Republican	Jim Bunning	72,808	74.42
Republican	Lester H. Burns Jr.	7,340	7.50
Republican	Don Wiggins Jr.	5,464	5.59
Republican	Elizabeth Bette Wickham	5,174	5.29
Republican	Thurman Jerome Hamlin	3,578	3.66
Republican	Ben Auxier Jr.	3,472	3.55
Total votes		97,836	100.00

== General election ==
=== Candidates ===
Major party candidates

- Martha Layne Collins, Democratic
- Jim Bunning, Republican

Other candidates

- Nicholas McCubbin, Independent

The race was generally thought to be relatively uneventful, and was seen as a particularly dull race, up until the debate. Collins was the favorite for most of the race and lead in polls and fundraising.

=== Debates ===
Bunning initially pushed for seven debates to be held in each of the seven congressional districts at the time. Only one debate would be held on October 12, 1983.

=== Results ===
In the end, Collins won comfortably, making history as the first woman elected as Kentucky Governor. Bunning struggled in a state where Democrats outnumbered Republicans. Even among Republicans, he struggled to maintain unity, with prominent Republicans only tepidly backing him. In contrast, Collins received support from every living Democratic governor, including Brown. He wasn't helped by his cold manner on the campaign trail, for being a Catholic in a Protestant state, and for inconsistent messaging on his position towards the incumbent Brown administration. Moreover, despite some Republicans' hopes that Collins' gender would be a liability, little evidence bore this out, and her anti-abortion stance and lukewarm ERA support was thought to have helped insulate her from serious damage from more conservative voters.

1983 Kentucky gubernatorial election
Party	Candidate	Votes	%	±%
Democratic	Martha Layne Collins	561,674	54.50	−4.99
Republican	Jim Bunning	454,650	44.11	+3.60
Citizens United	Nicholas D. McCubbin	14,347	1.39	N/A
Total votes		1,030,671	100.0	N/A
Turnout		1,041,649	56.23	
Registered electors		1,852,353		
Democratic hold				

== Results by county ==
County	Democrat	Democrat %	Republican	Republican %	Other Candidates	Other Candidates %	Total Votes
ADAIR	2532	44.7	3121	55.09	12	0.21	5665
ALLEN	1778	53.3	1545	46.31	13	0.39	3336
ANDERSON	2652	62.56	1528	36.05	59	1.39	4239
BALLARD	1865	72.43	660	25.63	50	1.94	2575
BARREN	5958	61.7	3661	37.91	37	0.38	9656
BATH	2572	65.48	1319	33.58	37	0.94	3928
BELL	4260	52.31	3738	45.9	145	1.78	8143
BOONE	6338	49.29	6453	50.19	67	0.52	12858
BOURBON	3079	62.77	1690	34.45	136	2.77	4905
BOYD	8580	56.52	6271	41.31	329	2.17	15180
BOYLE	3551	55.64	2786	43.65	45	0.71	6382
BRACKEN	1492	56.88	1121	42.74	10	0.38	2623
BREATHITT	3919	77.22	1142	22.5	14	0.28	5075
BRECKINRIDGE	2832	54.58	2339	45.08	18	0.35	5189
BULLITT	5387	54.51	4337	43.89	158	1.6	9882
BUTLER	1132	34.71	2113	64.8	16	0.49	3261
CALDWELL	2440	63.51	1357	35.32	45	1.17	3842
CALLOWAY	4532	65.1	2392	34.36	38	0.55	6962
CAMPBELL	11244	42.68	14988	56.9	110	0.42	26342
CARLISLE	1257	69.1	542	29.8	20	1.1	1819
CARROLL	1999	67.22	968	32.55	7	0.24	2974
CARTER	3269	54	2650	43.77	135	2.23	6054
CASEY	1324	28.03	3358	71.1	41	0.87	4723
CHRISTIAN	6106	60.97	3876	38.71	32	0.32	10014
CLARK	4161	61.29	2523	37.16	105	1.55	6789
CLAY	4614	49.46	4654	49.89	60	0.64	9328
CLINTON	1037	26.62	2851	73.2	7	0.18	3895
CRITTENDEN	1379	52.25	1248	47.29	12	0.45	2639
CUMBERLAND	984	37.59	1625	62.07	9	0.34	2618
DAVIESS	12229	53.05	10487	45.49	337	1.46	23053
EDMONSON	1134	38.3	1810	61.13	17	0.57	2961
ELLIOTT	1407	78.3	373	20.76	17	0.95	1797
ESTILL	2045	44.5	2519	54.82	31	0.67	4595
FAYETTE	26966	50.35	25170	46.99	1426	2.66	53562
FLEMING	2268	59.09	1554	40.49	16	0.42	3838
FLOYD	9365	69.67	3997	29.74	79	0.59	13441
FRANKLIN	12888	72.18	4612	25.83	356	1.99	17856
FULTON	1580	70.85	642	28.79	8	0.36	2230
GALLATIN	1342	71.31	535	28.43	5	0.27	1882
GARRARD	1633	43.56	2073	55.29	43	1.15	3749
GRANT	2360	62.24	1356	35.76	76	2	3792
GRAVES	7188	62.78	4110	35.9	151	1.32	11449
GRAYSON	2712	44.39	3316	54.27	82	1.34	6110
GREEN	2080	45.28	2501	54.44	13	0.28	4594
GREENUP	5799	44.98	4682	36.32	2410	18.7	12891
HANCOCK	1215	58.19	834	39.94	39	1.87	2088
HARDIN	8012	54.73	6438	43.98	190	1.3	14640
HARLAN	5845	63.55	3261	35.45	92	1	9198
HARRISON	3114	65.88	1567	33.15	46	0.97	4727
HART	2644	59.12	1804	40.34	24	0.54	4472
HENDERSON	5765	63.84	3218	35.64	47	0.52	9030
HENRY	3185	73.49	1122	25.89	27	0.62	4334
HICKMAN	1352	71.84	488	25.93	42	2.23	1882
HOPKINS	6439	58.94	4414	40.41	71	0.65	10924
JACKSON	1153	31.83	2454	67.75	15	0.41	3622
JEFFERSON	110899	51.02	103302	47.53	3158	1.45	217359
JESSAMINE	3708	54.93	2883	42.71	159	2.36	6750
JOHNSON	2587	50.97	2426	47.79	63	1.24	5076
KENTON	16022	43.79	20414	55.8	150	0.41	36586
KNOTT	3687	76.88	1074	22.39	35	0.73	4796
KNOX	3488	48.14	3724	51.4	33	0.46	7245
LARUE	2277	61.01	1430	38.32	25	0.67	3732
LAUREL	3985	42.45	5346	56.95	57	0.61	9388
LAWRENCE	1771	56.22	1357	43.08	22	0.7	3150
LEE	1094	43.29	1414	55.96	19	0.75	2527
LESLIE	2213	40.6	3213	58.94	25	0.46	5451
LETCHER	4868	61.44	2980	37.61	75	0.95	7923
LEWIS	1434	41.71	1993	57.97	11	0.32	3438
LINCOLN	2405	53.65	2039	45.48	39	0.87	4483
LIVINGSTON	1719	68.79	774	30.97	6	0.24	2499
LOGAN	3965	72.61	1406	25.75	90	1.65	5461
LYON	1365	72.3	514	27.22	9	0.48	1888
MADISON	6802	52.53	5842	45.11	306	2.36	12950
MAGOFFIN	2966	60.79	1870	38.33	43	0.88	4879
MARION	3457	59.8	2294	39.68	30	0.52	5781
MARSHALL	4660	65.19	2469	34.54	19	0.27	7148
MARTIN	1281	54.58	1054	44.91	12	0.51	2347
MASON	3234	59.26	2211	40.52	12	0.22	5457
MCCRACKEN	11870	63.34	6278	33.5	593	3.16	18741
MCCREARY	1250	35.8	2195	62.86	47	1.35	3492
MCLEAN	1731	65.99	867	33.05	25	0.95	2623
MEADE	2845	57.64	2043	41.39	48	0.97	4936
MENIFEE	985	68.74	398	27.77	50	3.49	1433
MERCER	3456	63.09	1907	34.81	115	2.1	5478
METCALFE	2062	60.63	1327	39.02	12	0.35	3401
MONROE	1911	40.11	2832	59.45	21	0.44	4764
MONTGOMERY	3568	61.03	2234	38.21	44	0.75	5846
MORGAN	2492	76.09	767	23.42	16	0.49	3275
MUHLENBERG	4463	60.1	2919	39.31	44	0.59	7426
NELSON	4457	54.08	3668	44.5	117	1.42	8242
NICHOLAS	1467	65.96	707	31.79	50	2.25	2224
OHIO	2829	48.27	3003	51.24	29	0.49	5861
OLDHAM	3599	46.35	4124	53.11	42	0.54	7765
OWEN	2304	77.08	672	22.48	13	0.43	2989
OWSLEY	677	38.1	1088	61.23	12	0.68	1777
PENDLETON	1885	56.66	1427	42.89	15	0.45	3327
PERRY	5624	62.85	3221	36	103	1.15	8948
PIKE	12391	61.33	7692	38.07	121	0.6	20204
POWELL	1860	60.37	1196	38.82	25	0.81	3081
PULASKI	5622	38.41	8834	60.35	181	1.24	14637
ROBERTSON	569	64.66	309	35.11	2	0.23	880
ROCKCASTLE	1314	32.57	2694	66.78	26	0.64	4034
ROWAN	2966	56.25	2263	42.92	44	0.83	5273
RUSSELL	2029	38.77	3195	61.05	9	0.17	5233
SCOTT	3567	64.77	1809	32.85	131	2.38	5507
SHELBY	5373	74.56	1810	25.12	23	0.32	7206
SIMPSON	2416	68.71	1083	30.8	17	0.48	3516
SPENCER	1326	72.03	505	27.43	10	0.54	1841
TAYLOR	3863	53.33	3360	46.38	21	0.29	7244
TODD	1543	70.39	596	27.19	53	2.42	2192
TRIGG	2053	67.94	958	31.7	11	0.36	3022
TRIMBLE	1487	68.62	666	30.73	14	0.65	2167
UNION	2844	65.02	1510	34.52	20	0.46	4374
WARREN	10290	59.7	6882	39.93	63	0.37	17235
WASHINGTON	1950	52.96	1659	45.06	73	1.98	3682
WAYNE	2750	45.36	3299	54.41	14	0.23	6063
WEBSTER	2998	65.98	1512	33.27	34	0.75	4544
WHITLEY	3219	40.87	4610	58.52	48	0.61	7877
WOLFE	1486	71.89	550	26.61	31	1.5	2067
WOODFORD	4403	69.7	1759	27.85	155	2.45	6317
TOTAL VOTES	561674	54.5	454650	44.11	14347	1.39	1030671
