= James B. Graham =

American politician and educator (1923–2007)

James Bernard Graham

Auditor of Kentucky
- In office January 7, 1980 – January 2, 1984
- Governor: John Y. Brown Jr. Martha Layne Collins
- Preceded by: George L. Atkins
- Succeeded by: Mary Ann Tobin

35th Kentucky Superintendent of Public Instruction
- In office January 1976 – January 1980
- Preceded by: Lyman V. Ginger
- Succeeded by: Raymond H. Barber

Personal details
- Born: December 24, 1923 Fairfield, Kentucky, U.S.
- Died: June 22, 2007 (aged 83) Frankfort, Kentucky, U.S.
- Party: Democratic
- Education: William Jewell College (AB) University of Kansas (MA) University of Kentucky (PhD)

James B. Graham (December 24, 1923 – June 22, 2007) was the Kentucky Auditor of Public Accounts from 1980 to 1984 and the Kentucky Superintendent of Public Instruction from 1976 to 1980. He was a member of the Democratic Party.

== Biography ==
Graham was born in Fairfield, Kentucky to Bruce Alexander Graham and Bessie Caldwell Graham. He had seven brothers: Henry, Milton, Billy, Davis, Jerry, Alan, and James; and five sisters Kitty Ann, Lena, Jenny, Mildred, and Peggye. He received his AB degree from William Jewell College, his master's degree from the University of Kansas, and his PhD from the University of Kentucky.

After graduation, he served as superintendent of the Nelson County Public Schools from 1954 to 1968, the Ashland Independent School District from 1968 to 1970, and the Bowling Green Independent School District from 1970 to 1976.

In 1975 he ran for the office of Superintendent of Public Instruction of Kentucky. He won a five way Democratic Party primary by winning 85,037 votes while his closest competitor, Jerry C. Alleyne, totaled 37,235. He defeated Republican James M. Taylor in the general election, 393,052 votes to 231,255. While in office, he studied the educational system of Japan in 1977 and of Syria and Iran in 1978. His name is on the well known case of Stone v. Graham where the state of Kentucky was sued over a statute requiring the posting of the Ten Commandments in public schools.

He ran for the office of Auditor of Public Accounts in 1979. In the Democratic primary he easily won a four-way race by winning 121,328 votes. His closest competitor, Sara Bell, won 69,295. In the general election, he defeated a former Auditor, Republican Mary Louise Foust.

Graham also served outside of elected office. He was President of the Kentucky Association of School Administrators from 1967 to 1968. He served as a member of the Board of Directors of the Kentucky Teachers Retirement System from 1976 to 1980. He was a member of the Southeastern Intergovernmental Audit Forum in 1981. He was also President of the Board of Trustees of the Stephen Foster Drama Association.

== Personal life ==
Graham was married to Lorena P. Graham and they had two children, Janet and Diana. While living in Nelson County, he was a member and deacon of the Bardstown Baptist Church. After leaving office he lived in Bowling Green, Kentucky. He died in Frankfort, Kentucky and was buried in Bardstown.

Party political offices
Preceded by George L. Atkins	Democratic nominee for Kentucky Auditor of Public Accounts; 1979	Succeeded by Mary Ann Tobin
Political offices
Preceded by George L. Atkins	Kentucky Auditor of Public Accounts; 1980–1984	Succeeded by Mary Ann Tobin
