= Martha Layne Collins =

American politician (1936–2025)

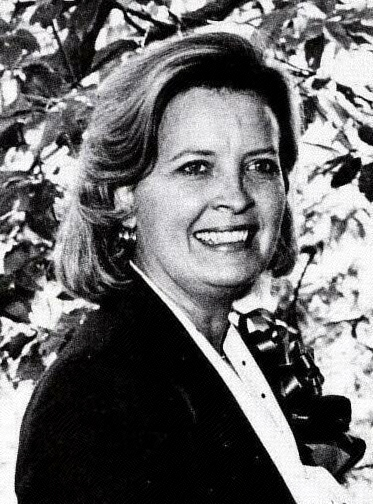
- Collins in the early 1980s

56th Governor of Kentucky
- In office December 13, 1983 – December 8, 1987
- Lieutenant: Steve Beshear
- Preceded by: John Y. Brown Jr.
- Succeeded by: Wallace Wilkinson

48th Lieutenant Governor of Kentucky
- In office December 11, 1979 – December 13, 1983
- Governor: John Y. Brown Jr.
- Preceded by: Thelma Stovall
- Succeeded by: Steve Beshear

23rd Chair of the National Lieutenant Governors Association
- In office 1982–1983
- Preceded by: Mike Curb
- Succeeded by: William Scranton III

Personal details
- Born: Martha Layne Hall; December 7, 1936 Bagdad, Kentucky, U.S.
- Died: November 1, 2025 (aged 88) Lexington, Kentucky, U.S.
- Resting place: Frankfort Cemetery
- Party: Democratic
- Spouse: Bill Collins (m. 1959)
- Children: 2
- Education: Lindenwood University (attended); University of Kentucky (BS)

Martha Layne Collins (née Hall; December 7, 1936 – November 1, 2025) was an American businesswoman and politician from Kentucky; she served as the state's 56th governor from 1983 to 1987, the first woman to hold the office and the only one to date. Prior to that, she served as the 48th lieutenant governor of Kentucky, under John Y. Brown Jr. Her election as governor made her the highest-ranking woman in the Democratic Party. She was considered as a possible running mate for Democratic presidential nominee Walter Mondale in the 1984 presidential election, but Mondale chose Congresswoman Geraldine Ferraro instead.

After graduating from the University of Kentucky, Collins worked as a school teacher while her husband finished a degree in dentistry. She became interested in politics, and worked on both Wendell Ford's gubernatorial campaign in 1971 and Walter Dee Huddleston's United States Senate campaign in 1972. In 1975, she was chosen secretary of the state's Democratic Party and was elected clerk of the Kentucky Court of Appeals. During her tenure as clerk, a constitutional amendment restructured the state's judicial system, and the Court of Appeals became the Kentucky Supreme Court. Collins continued as clerk of the renamed court and worked to educate citizens about the court's new role.

Collins was elected lieutenant governor in 1979, under Governor John Y. Brown Jr. Brown was frequently out of the state, leaving Collins as acting governor for more than 500 days of her four-year term as lieutenant governor. In 1983, she defeated Republican Jim Bunning to become Kentucky's first woman governor. Her administration had two primary focuses: education and economic development. After failing to secure increased funding for education in the 1984 legislative session, she conducted a statewide public awareness campaign in advance of a special legislative session the following year; the modified program was passed in that session. She successfully used economic incentives to bring a Toyota manufacturing plant to Georgetown, Kentucky, in 1986. Legal challenges to the incentives – which would have cost the state the plant and its related economic benefits – were eventually dismissed by the Kentucky Supreme Court. The Toyota Georgetown plant, which led to more automakers settling in Kentucky, is regarded as Collins's biggest accomplishment during her time as Governor. The state experienced record economic growth under Collins's leadership. Despite failing to achieve a major overhaul in the state's vocational education system, Collins would find greater success in improving the state's general education system; a lawsuit which had been filed in 1985 under her leadership also led to a landmark Kentucky Supreme Court ruling which resulted in the eventual passage of the Kentucky Education Reform Act of 1990 which, among other things, overhauled the state's K-12 education system and created a state funded preschool system.

At the time, Kentucky governors were not eligible for reelection. Collins taught at several universities after her four-year term as governor. From 1990 to 1996, she was the president of St. Catharine College near Springfield, Kentucky. The 1993 conviction of Collins's husband, Dr. Bill Collins, in an influence-peddling scandal, damaged her hopes for a return to political life. Prior to her husband's conviction it had been rumored that she would be a candidate for the U.S. Senate, or would take a position in the administration of President Bill Clinton. From 1998 to 2012, Collins served as an executive scholar-in-residence at Georgetown College.

== Early life ==
Martha Layne Hall was born December 7, 1936, in Bagdad, Kentucky, the only child of Everett and Mary (Taylor) Hall. When she was in the sixth grade, her family moved to Shelbyville, Kentucky, and opened the Hall-Taylor Funeral Home, with her father serving as the funeral director. Martha was involved in numerous extracurricular activities both in school and at the local Baptist church. Her parents were active in local politics, working for the campaigns of several Democratic candidates, and Hall frequently joined them, stuffing envelopes and delivering pamphlets door-to-door.

Hall attended Shelbyville High School, where she was a good student and a cheerleader. She frequently competed in beauty pageants and won the title of Shelby County Tobacco Festival Queen in 1954. After high school, Hall enrolled at Lindenwood College, then an all-woman college in Saint Charles, Missouri. After one year at Lindenwood, she transferred to the University of Kentucky in Lexington. She was active in many clubs, including the Chi Omega social sorority, the Baptist Student Union, and the home economics club, and was also the president of her dormitory and vice president of the house presidents council.

In 1957, Hall met Billy Louis Collins while attending a Baptist camp in Shelby County. He was a student at Georgetown College in Georgetown, Kentucky, about 13 miles from Lexington; he and Hall dated while finishing their degrees. Hall earned a Bachelor of Science degree in home economics in 1959. Having won the title of Kentucky Derby Festival Queen earlier that year, she briefly considered a career in modeling. Instead, she and Collins married shortly after her graduation. While Billy Collins pursued a degree in dentistry at the University of Louisville, Martha taught at Seneca and Fairdale high schools, both located in Louisville. While living in Louisville, the couple had two children, Steve and Marla.

In 1966, the Collinses moved to Versailles, Kentucky, where Martha taught at Woodford County Junior High School. The couple became active in several civic organizations, including the United States Junior Chamber and the Young Democratic Couples Club. Through the club, they worked on behalf of Henry Ward's unsuccessful gubernatorial campaign in 1967.

== Early political career ==
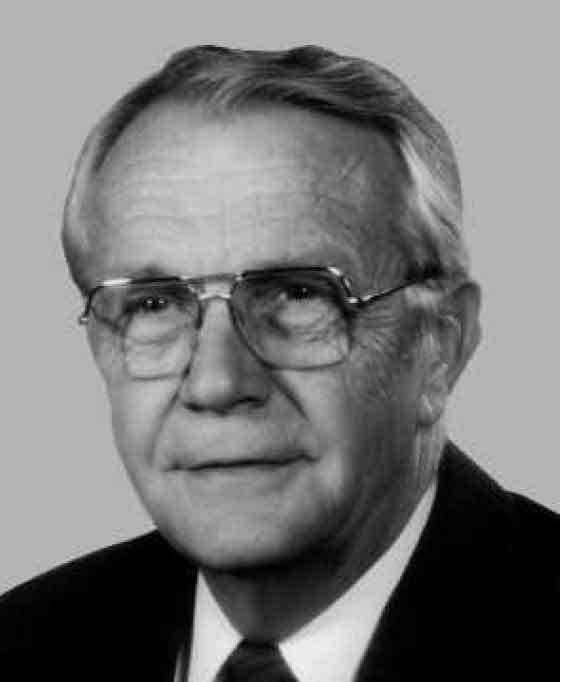
Wendell Ford; Collins worked on his 1971 gubernatorial campaign

By 1971, Collins was the president of the Jayceettes; through her work there, she came to the attention of Democratic Kentucky Senate member Dee Huddleston. Huddleston asked Collins to co-chair Wendell Ford's gubernatorial campaign in Kentucky's 6th congressional district. J. R. Miller, then-chairman of the state Democratic Party, commented that "She organized that district like you wouldn't believe." After Ford's victory, he named Collins as a Democratic National Committeewoman from Kentucky. She quit her teaching job and went to work full-time at the state Democratic Party headquarters, as secretary of the state Democratic party and as a delegate to the 1972 Democratic National Convention. The following year, she worked for Huddleston's campaign for the United States Senate.

In 1975, Collins won the Democratic nomination for Clerk of the Kentucky Court of Appeals in a five-way primary. In the general election, she defeated Republican nominee and future chief justice of the Kentucky Supreme Court Joseph Lambert by a vote of 382,528 to 233,442. During her term, an amendment to the Constitution of Kentucky changed the name of the Court of Appeals to the Kentucky Supreme Court; Collins was the last person to hold the office of Clerk of the Court of Appeals and the first to hold the office of Clerk of the Supreme Court. As clerk, she compiled and distributed a brochure about the new role of the Supreme Court, and worked with the state department of education to create a teacher's manual for use in the public schools, detailing the changes effected in the court system as a result of the constitutional amendment. The Woodford County chapter of Business and Professional Women chose Collins as its 1976 Woman of Achievement, and in 1977, Governor Julian Carroll named her Kentucky Executive Director of the Friendship Force.

In a field that included six major candidates, Collins secured the Democratic nomination for lieutenant governor in the 1979 primary, garnering 23 percent of the vote. She handily defeated Republican Hal Rogers in the general election 543,176 to 316,798. As lieutenant governor, she traveled the state, attending ceremonies in place of Democratic Governor John Y. Brown Jr., who disliked such formal events and often chose not to attend. By the end of her term, she declared that she had visited all 120 counties in Kentucky. Governor Brown was frequently out of the state, leaving Collins as acting governor for more than 500 days of her four-year term.

As lieutenant governor, Collins presided over the state Senate. Members of both major parties praised Collins for her impartiality and knowledge of parliamentary procedure in this role. She was twice called upon to break tie votes in the Senate, once on a bill allowing the state's teachers to engage in collective bargaining and another on a bill to allow branch banking across county lines within the state; in both instances she voted in the negative, killing the bill. During her tenure, she also chaired the National Lieutenant Governors Association, becoming the first woman to hold that position. In 1982, she was named to the board of regents of the Southern Baptist Theological Seminary in Louisville.

== Gubernatorial election of 1983 ==
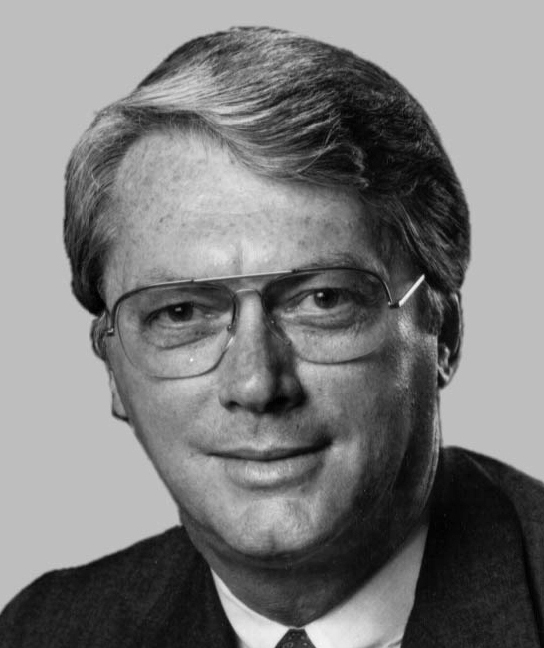
Jim Bunning was Collins's Republican opponent in the 1983 gubernatorial election.

Nearing the end of her term as lieutenant governor, Collins announced her intent to run for governor in 1983. Her opponents for the Democratic nomination included Louisville mayor Harvey I. Sloane and Grady Stumbo, the former secretary of the state's Department of Human Resources. Collins had the support of many leaders in the Democratic Party, but just before the primary, Governor Brown, who Collins served as lieutenant governor for, endorsed Stumbo, charging that both Sloane and Collins would use their gubernatorial appointment power to dispense party patronage. Although this was a common practice at the time, Brown notably shunned it during his term. With 223,692 votes, Collins edged out Sloane (219,160 votes) and Stumbo (199,795 votes) to secure the nomination. Sloane asked for a recanvass of the ballots, but ultimately decided it would not change the outcome and conceded defeat.

In the general election, Collins faced Republican state senator Jim Bunning, who was later elected to the Baseball Hall of Fame for his achievements as a professional pitcher. The National Organization for Women, the Women's Campaign Fund, and the Women's Political Caucus all refused to endorse Collins, citing her lukewarm support for the Equal Rights Amendment and her opposition to abortion except in cases of rape, incest, or when the mother's life was in danger. But Bunning was not personable on the campaign trail and had difficulty finding issues that would draw traditionally Democratic voters to him. His Catholicism was a political liability among the majority-Protestant voters. Collins won the election by a vote of 561,674 to 454,650, becoming the first, and to date only, woman to be elected governor of Kentucky.

Following her election, Collins donated the surplus $242,000 from her campaign coffers to the state Democratic Party. When Collins's husband was named state treasurer for the party – at an annual salary of $59,900 – the state press charged that the move was a plot to funnel Collins's campaign funds into her personal account. (The previous Democratic state treasurer had received no salary during his tenure.) Following the media criticism, Dr. Collins resigned his post as treasurer. All of the involved individuals insisted that Governor Collins had not been briefed on the details of her husband's appointment. The media's criticism of Collins continued as many of the appointments to her executive cabinet went to what they characterized as inexperienced personnel who had held key positions in her past campaigns. When newly appointed Insurance Commissioner Gilbert McCarty approved a 17% rate increase requested by Blue Cross Blue Shield Association – a request that his predecessor had denied a few days earlier – Collins quickly countermanded the approval pending a public hearing on the matter.

== Governor of Kentucky ==
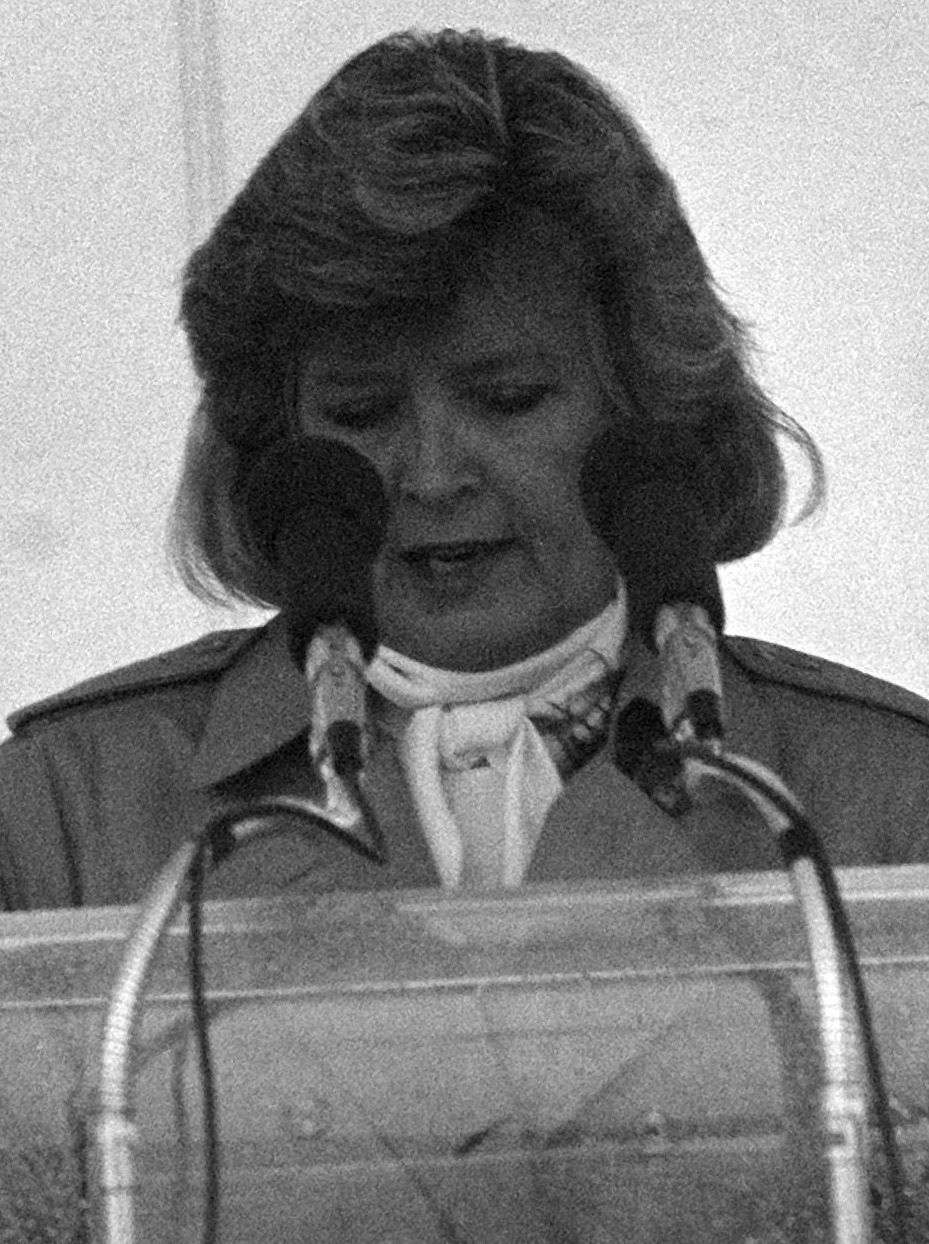
Collins speaking in 1986 during the commissioning of the USS Louisville

In her first address to the legislature, Collins asked for an additional $324 million from the Kentucky General Assembly, most of it allocated for education. The additional revenue was to be derived from Collins's proposed tax package, which included increasing the income tax on individuals making more than $15,000 annually, extending the sales tax to cover services such as auto repair and dry cleaning, and increasing the corporate licensing tax. After opposition to her proposal developed among legislators during the 1984 biennial legislative session, Collins revised the tax package. She retained the corporate licensing tax increase, but replaced the sales tax and income tax modifications with a flat five percent personal income tax and phasing out the deductions for depreciation which corporations could claim on their state taxes.

With the state still recovering from an economic recession and an election year upcoming, legislators refused to raise taxes. Collins eventually withdrew her request and submitted a continuation budget instead. Some education proposals advocated by Collins were passed, including mandatory kindergarten, remedial programs for elementary school children, mandatory testing and internship for teachers, and the implementation of academic receivership for underperforming schools. Among the other accomplishments of the 1984 legislative session were passage of a tougher drunk driving law, and a measure allowing state banking companies to purchase other banks within the state. Despite also campaigning as someone who would not hesitate to sign death warrants as governor, she would not do so during her time in office.

=== Consideration for vice-president ===
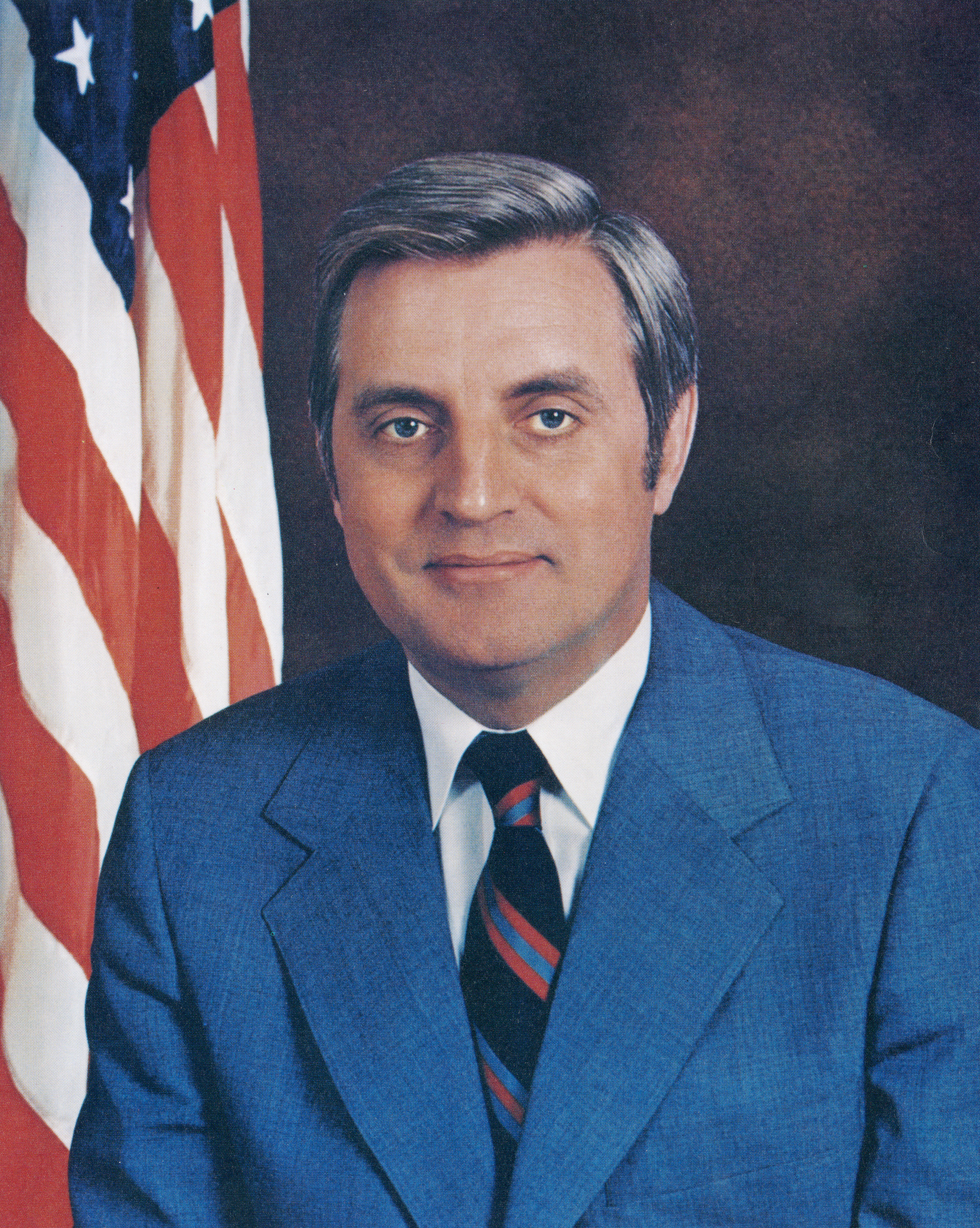
Walter Mondale interviewed Collins as his potential running mate in 1984.

By virtue of her election as Kentucky's governor, Collins became the highest-ranking Democratic woman in the nation. The only two women in the U.S. Senate at the time were Republicans, and Collins was the only woman governor of any state. Shortly after her election, she appeared on Good Morning America, where she was asked about her interest in the vice presidency and gave a non-committal answer. Four days after her inauguration as governor, she was chosen to deliver the Democratic response to President of the United States Ronald Reagan's weekly address of the president of the United States. At a news conference following her speech, Collins was asked again if she would be willing to be considered as the Democrats' vice-presidential candidate in the upcoming election; she replied "No, not at this time."

In mid-1984, the Democratic National Committee chose Collins to preside over the 1984 Democratic National Convention in San Francisco. This engagement prevented Collins from chairing the state delegation to the convention, as was typical of governors. The party appointed Collins's son, Steve as state chair. Prior to the convention, Walter Mondale, the presumptive presidential nominee, interviewed Collins as a possible vice-presidential candidate before choosing Geraldine Ferraro as his running mate. A writer for Miami Herald later opined, based on interviews with Mondale advisers, that Collins was never given serious consideration by Mondale. He reported that she was included in his list of potential running mates primarily to blunt potential charges of "tokenism" in considering other women and minorities.

=== Education proposals ===
In January 1985, Collins renewed her push for additional education funding and changes by appointing herself secretary of the state Education and Humanities Cabinet. Following the announcement, Collins and several key legislators held a series of meetings in every county, advocating for her proposed changes and seeking information about what types of changes the state's citizens desired. At the meetings, Collins was careful to separate the issues of her proposed education plan and potential tax increases. She believed that opposition to increased taxes had prevented her previous package from being enacted.

Collins announced a new education package in June 1985 that included a five percent across-the-board pay raise for teachers, a reduction in class sizes, funding for construction projects, aides for every kindergarten teacher in the state, and a "power equalization" program to make funding for poorer school districts more equal to that of their more affluent counterparts. After favorable reaction to the plan from legislators, she called a special legislative session to convene July 8 to consider the plan. After two weeks of deliberation, the General Assembly approved Collins's education plan, tripling the corporate licensing tax to $2.10 per $1,000 in order to pay for the package. The Assembly rejected a proposed five-cents-per-gallon increase in the state gasoline tax to finance other spending.

Collins followed up her success in the 1985 special session with a push for more higher education funding in the 1986 legislative session. Lawmakers obliged by approving an additional $100 million for higher education in the biennial budget. They also approved implementation of a pilot preschool program and the purchase of new reading textbooks, but failed to act on Collins's request for an additional $3.9 million to improve the state's vocational education system. Legislators approved calling a referendum on a constitutional amendment – supported by Collins – to make the state superintendent of education an appointive, rather than elective, office. The amendment was defeated by the state's voters in November 1986, despite a Collins-led campaign in favor of it. The increased corporate tax intended to cover the cost of the increased education budget was, however, inadequate. In 1987, a plan to increase revenue through changes in the state income tax was abandoned when Wallace Wilkinson, the Democratic gubernatorial nominee who would go on to succeed Collins, announced his opposition to it. However, a lawsuit which was filed in 1985 under the leadership of Collins would eventually lead to a landmark 1989 decision by the state Supreme Court, which in turn prompted the passage of the Kentucky Education Reform Act of 1990 that overhauled Kentucky's entire K-12 school system and created the state funded Kentucky Preschool Program.

=== Toyota Assembly Plant ===
In March 1985, Collins embarked on the first of several trade missions to Japan. She returned there in October 1985, and also visited China – a first for any Kentucky governor – to encourage opening Chinese markets for Kentucky goods and to establish a "sister state" relationship with China's Jiangxi province. Collins's efforts in Japan yielded her most significant accomplishment as governor – convincing Toyota to locate an $800 million manufacturing plant in Georgetown. According to published reports, the Kentucky location was chosen over proposed sites in Indiana, Missouri, Tennessee, and Kansas.

The agreement with Toyota was contingent upon legislative approval of $125 million in incentives promised to Toyota by Collins and state Commerce Secretary Carroll Knicely. They included $35 million to buy and improve a 1,600 acres (650 ha) tract to be given to Toyota for the plant, $33 million for initial training of employees, $10 million for a skills development center for employees, and $47 million in highway improvements near the site. The incentive package was approved in the 1986 legislative session. Attorney General of Kentucky David L. Armstrong expressed concerns that the incentives might conflict with the state constitution by giving gifts from the state treasury to a private business, but concluded that the General Assembly had made "a good-faith effort to be in compliance with the constitution".

Given Armstrong's concerns, the administration employed general counsel J. Patrick Abell to file a friendly test case to determine the constitutionality of the incentive package. While the suit was pending, the Lexington Herald-Leader reported that the administration had failed to include the interest on the bonds used to finance the expenditures in its estimation of the cost; this, plus the cost overruns reported by the Herald-Leader, had already pushed the total cost of the package to about $354 million by late September 1986. In October, Toyota agreed to cover the cost overruns associated with preparing the site for construction.

Opponents of the economic enticements for Toyota joined the state's test suit. In October 1986, Franklin County Circuit Court Judge Ray Corns issued an initial ruling that the package did not violate the state constitution, but both sides asked the Kentucky Supreme Court to make a final decision. On June 11, 1987, the Kentucky Supreme Court ruled 4–3 that the package served a public purpose and were therefore constitutional.

Shortly after the announcement that Toyota was moving to Georgetown, Collins, in her capacity as governor, condemned a portion of land belonging to real estate developer Gordon Taub. Taub owned 60 acres (24 ha) within the Toyota plant site and 4.2 acres (1.7 ha) were condemned to build a four-lane highway to the Toyota plant entrance. Taub challenged the condemnation, stating that the Commonwealth did not have the right to condemn private property for the use of a for profit, public corporation. At trial, Collins became the first sitting governor of Kentucky to testify in court. She was represented by former governor Bert Combs; Taub was represented by former governor Louie Nunn. This was also the first time in the history of Kentucky that two former governors represented opposing parties in a legal action.

Later, Toyota set up several assembly plants across the state; near the end of Collins's term, the state Commerce Cabinet reported that 25 automotive-related manufacturing plants had been constructed in 17 counties since the Toyota announcement.

In 1987, Collins promised $10 million in state aid to Ford to incentivize the company to expand its truck assembly plant in Louisville. The state experienced record job growth under Collins's economic development plan, which included attempts to attract both domestic and international companies. The state's unemployment rate fell from 9.7 percent in October 1983 to 7.2 percent in October 1987; according to the administration's own figures, they created a net increase of 73,000 jobs in the state during Collins's tenure.

The Georgetown, Kentucky Toyota Plant, which led to Toyota and other major automakers settling in Kentucky and numerous jobs being created in Kentucky through the auto industry, is regarded as the most recognizable part of Collins's legacy as Governor.

=== Other matters during Collins's term ===
On October 7, 1987, Collins called a special legislative session to close a deficit between state contributions to the worker's compensation Special Fund and disbursements. The Special Fund was designated for payments to workers with occupational diseases and workers whose work-related injuries could not be traced to any single employer. A plan proposed by Democratic state senator Ed O'Daniel was expected to provide the framework for legislation considered in the session. Under O'Daniel's plan, additional revenue for the Special Fund would be raised by increasing assessments on worker's compensation premiums for 30 years. Assessments for coal companies were increased more than those on other businesses because the majority of the claims paid from the Special Fund were for black lung disease, a breathing disease common among coal miners; consequently, it was opposed by legislators from heavily coal-dependent counties. Nevertheless, after nine days of negotiations, a bill substantially similar to O'Daniel's original plan was approved by the legislature and signed by Collins.

Collins chaired the Tennessee–Tombigbee Waterway Authority and held that position when the waterway opened to the public in 1985. On May 10, 1985, she was named to the University of Kentucky Alumni Association's Hall of Distinguished Alumni. She also chaired the Southern Growth Policies Board, Southern States Energy Board, and was co-chair of the Appalachian Regional Commission.

== Activities after leaving office ==
Collins's term expired on December 8, 1987, and under the restrictions then present in the Kentucky Constitution, she was ineligible for consecutive terms. In 1988, she accepted a position as "executive in residence" at the University of Louisville, giving guest lectures to students in the university's business classes. She also started an international trade consulting firm in Lexington. When Western Kentucky University president Kern Alexander resigned to accept a position at Virginia Tech in 1988, Collins was among four finalists to succeed him. Some faculty members publicly expressed concerns about Collins's lack of experience in academia, and she withdrew her name from consideration shortly before the new president was announced.

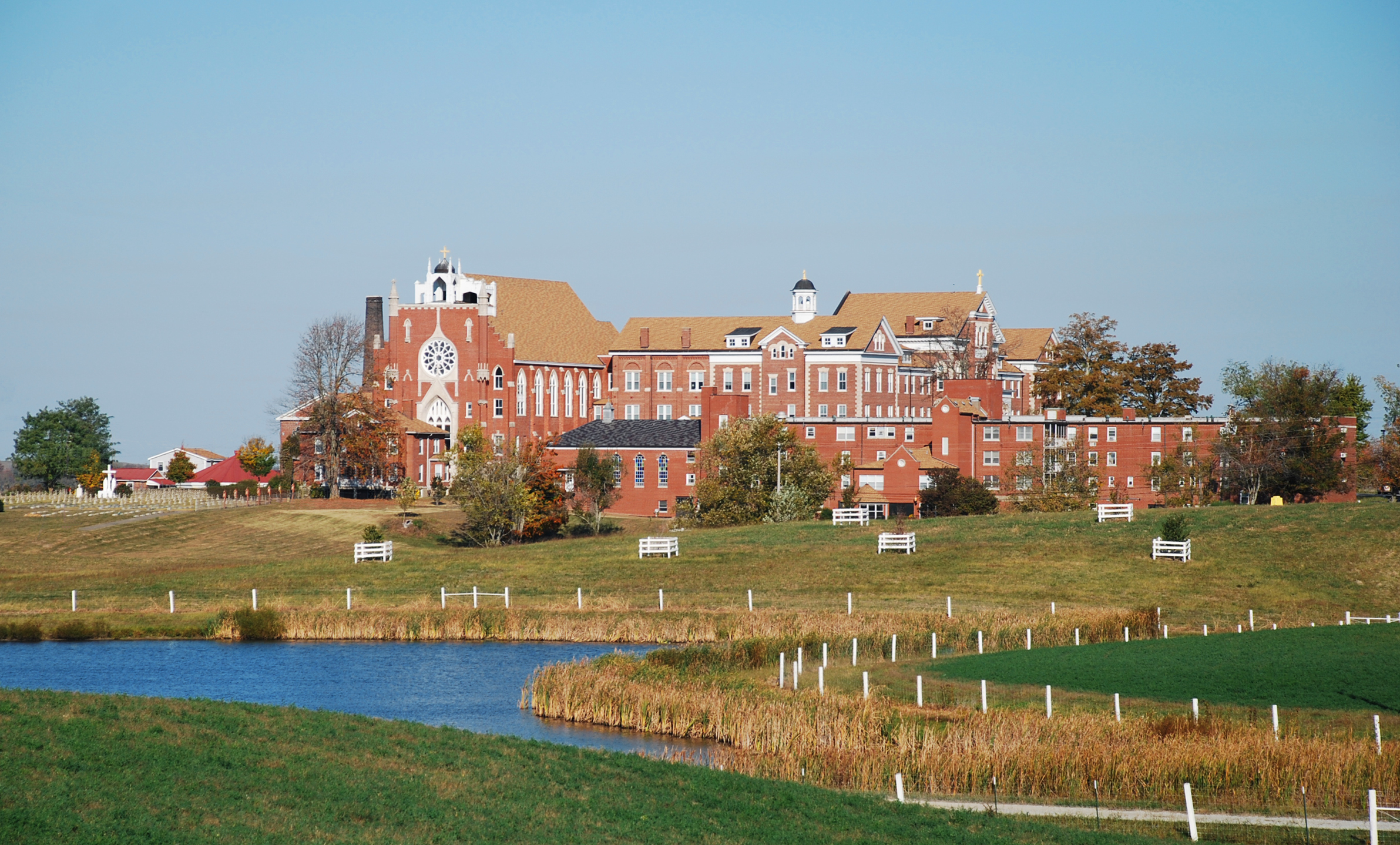
St. Catharine College; Collins was its president from 1990 to 1996.

After fulfilling her one-year commitment to the University of Louisville, Collins was named a fellow of the Harvard Institute of Politics' Harvard Kennedy School, teaching non-credit classes on leadership styles once a week. Concurrent with her position at Harvard, Collins was named to the board of regents for Midway University in 1989; the following year, she was removed from the board of regents of Southern Baptist Theological Seminary. Her removal was automatically triggered after she missed three consecutive board meetings between 1986 and 1989. In 1990, Collins accepted the presidency of St. Catharine College near Springfield, Kentucky, becoming the first president of the small, Catholic college who was not a Dominican nun. College officials stated that Collins was recruited for the presidency to raise the college's profile.

In 1993, Collins's husband, Bill, was charged in an influence-peddling scandal. The prosecution claimed that while Collins was governor, Dr. Collins exploited a perception that he could influence the awarding of state contracts through his wife. It was alleged that he exploited this perception to pressure people who did business with the state to invest nearly $2 million with him. He was convicted on October 14, 1993, after a seven-week trial; he was given a sentence of five years and three months in federal prison, which was at the low end of the range prescribed by the federal sentencing guidelines. He was also fined $20,000 for a conspiracy charge that involved kickbacks disguised as political contributions. Governor Collins was called to testify in the trial, but was not charged. The scandal tarnished her image, however, and may have cost her an appointment in the administration of President Bill Clinton. Collins was also rumored to be considering running for the U.S. Senate, a bid which never materialized following her husband's conviction. The Collinses reunited following Dr. Collins's release from prison on October 10, 1997.

In 1996, Collins resigned as president of St. Catharine College to direct the International Business and Management Center at the University of Kentucky. Later that year, she was a co-chair of the Credentials Committee at the Democratic National Convention. When her contract with the University of Kentucky expired in 1998, Collins took a part-time position as "executive scholar in residence" at Georgetown College, which allowed her more time to pursue other interests. In 1999, she was named Honorary Consul General of Japan in Kentucky, a position which involved promoting Japanese interests in Kentucky, encouraging Japanese investment in the state, and encouraging cultural understanding between Kentucky and Japan. In 2001, Governor Paul E. Patton named her co-chair of the Kentucky Task Force on the Economic Status of Women. In January 2005, she became the chairwoman and chief executive officer of the Kentucky World Trade Center. She has held positions on the boards of directors for several corporations, including Kodak.

== Death ==
Collins died in her sleep on November 1, 2025, at 3:00 a.m. at the Richmond Place Retirement Community in Lexington, Kentucky. She was 88. On November 3, 2025, Kentucky Governor Andy Beshear ordered flags at state office buildings in Kentucky to fly at half staff in honor of Collins until sunset on the day of her interment. Due to a multi-year construction project at the Kentucky State Capitol, Collins would lie in state at the Old State Capitol on Sunday, November 9, 2025. Her funeral was afterwards held at the Old State Capitol the same day, family, colleagues and former and current Kentucky leaders as Governor Andy Beshear, Lieutenant Governor Jacqueline Coleman, former Secretary of State Alison Lundergan Grimes and Collins’ former Secretary of the Cabinet Larry Hayes being among those in attendance. On November 10, 2025, Collins was buried at Frankfort Cemetery.

=== Awards and honors ===
Women Leading Kentucky, a non-profit group designed to promote education, mentorship, and networking among Kentucky professional women, created the Martha Layne Collins Leadership Award in 1999 to recognize "a Kentucky woman of achievement who inspires and motivates other women through her personal, community and professional lives"; Collins was the first recipient of the award. In 2003, Kentucky's Bluegrass Parkway was renamed the Martha Layne Collins Bluegrass Parkway in her honor; Collins also received the World Trade Day Book of Honor Award for the state of Kentucky from the World Trade Centers Association that year. In 2009, she was inducted into the Order of the Rising Sun, Gold and Silver Star by the Japanese Ministry of Foreign Affairs for her contributions "to strengthening economic and cultural exchanges between Japan and the United States of America". Martha Layne Collins High School in Shelby County was named in her honor and opened in 2010.

== See also ==
- List of female governors in the United States
- List of female lieutenant governors in the United States
- Kentucky Colonel

Party political offices
Preceded by Thelma Stovall	Democratic nominee for the Lieutenant Governor of Kentucky; 1979	Succeeded by Steve Beshear
Preceded by John Y. Brown Jr.	Democratic nominee for the Governor of Kentucky; 1983	Succeeded by Wallace G. Wilkinson
Preceded by Tip O'Neill	Permanent Chair of the Democratic National Convention; 1984	Succeeded by Jim Wright
Political offices
Preceded by Thelma Stovall	Lieutenant Governor of Kentucky; 1979–1983	Succeeded by Steve Beshear
Preceded by John Y. Brown, Jr.	Governor of Kentucky; 1983–1987	Succeeded by Wallace G. Wilkinson
