= Viola Davis (disambiguation) =

Viola Davis (born 1965) is an American actress.

Viola Davis may also refer to:

- Viola Davis (Georgia politician) (born 1963), American politician from Georgia
- Viola Davis Brown (1936–2017), nurse and civil rights activist who engaged in politics
- Viola Desmond (1914–1965), born Viola Davis, Canadian civil rights activist and businesswoman
