= Mary Louise Foust =

American lawyer

Mary Foust

Auditor of Kentucky
- In office January 1970 – January 5, 1976
- Governor: Louie Nunn; Wendell Ford; Julian Carroll
- Preceded by: James Thompson
- Succeeded by: George L. Atkins
- In office January 2, 1956 – January 4, 1960
- Governor: Happy Chandler; Bert Combs
- Preceded by: Herbert Tinsley
- Succeeded by: Joseph Schneider

Personal details
- Born: October 15, 1909; New Albany, Indiana, U.S.
- Died: December 17, 1999 (aged 90); Shelbyville, Kentucky, U.S.
- Political party: Democratic (Before 1978); Republican (1978–1999)
- Education: Georgetown College (BA); University of Louisville (JD)

Mary Louise Foust (October 15, 1909 – December 17, 1999) served three terms as the Kentucky Auditor of Public Accounts and was the first woman to run for Governor of Kentucky. She was also the first woman in the state to be a licensed attorney and a certified public accountant.

== Early life ==
Foust was born in New Albany, Indiana to Baptist minister Rev. David T. Foust and Mary Margaret (Rippel) Foust. She would have a younger brother named David Rippel Foust. Her family moved to Shelbyville, Kentucky where she graduated high school. She received her degrees from Georgetown College and the University of Louisville School of Law and began working for the state in 1938 as a filing clerk in the Department of Revenue.

== Political life ==
She was first elected as Auditor of Public Accounts as a Democrat in 1955 and served a four-year term. She was the first woman elected to that position. In 1963 she ran as a candidate for governor, again being the first woman to do so. She came in third in the Democratic primary behind eventual governor Ned Breathitt and Happy Chandler. In 1969, she was elected to finish the term of Clyde Conley, who had died. She was re-elected for a full term from 1972 to 1976. She ran for governor again in 1975 but lost in the Democratic primary to eventual winner Julian Carroll.

Foust had always been known as a political maverick and she became very critical of Wendell Ford and Julian Carroll. In the late 1970s she switched parties to become a Republican.

She ran for the United States House of Representatives in 1978 but dropped out of the race in favor of Larry Hopkins. 1n 1979 she won the Republican nomination to again run for state auditor but lost in the general election to James B. Graham. In 1980 she won the Republican nomination for the United States Senate race but lost in the general election to Wendell Ford.

== Professional life ==
When not in office, Foust practiced law in Shelbyville and Lexington. As a CPA, she worked with Bittner and Clark in San Francisco, United States Steel Corporation in New Albany, and Humphrey Robinson and Company in Louisville. She was licensed to practice law before the United States Supreme Court.

Foust died in Shelbyville. She was the thirteenth person to lie in state in the Kentucky Capitol Rotunda. She is buried in Floyds Knobs, Indiana.

Political offices
Preceded by Herbert Tinsley	Auditor of Kentucky; 1955–1959	Succeeded by Joseph Schneider
Preceded by James Thompson	Auditor of Kentucky; 1969–1975	Succeeded by George Atkins
Party political offices
Preceded by John W. Greene	Democratic nominee for Kentucky Auditor of Public Accounts; 1971	Succeeded by George L. Atkins
Preceded by Richard "Dick" T. Combs	Republican nominee for Kentucky Auditor of Public Accounts; 1979	Succeeded by Ronald B. Halleck
Preceded by Marlow Cook	Republican nominee for U.S. Senator from Kentucky (Class 3); 1980	Succeeded by Jackson Andrews
