= George L. Atkins =

American politician (1941–2024)

Auditor of Kentucky
- In office January 5, 1976 – January 7, 1980
- Governor: Julian Carroll; John Y. Brown Jr.
- Preceded by: Mary Louise Foust
- Succeeded by: James B. Graham

Mayor of Hopkinsville, Kentucky
- In office 1972–1975

Personal details
- Born: July 10, 1941 Hopkinsville, Kentucky, U.S.
- Died: April 14, 2024 (aged 82)
- Party: Democratic
- Spouse: Donna Atkins
- Children: Three
- Education: University of Kentucky

George L. Atkins Jr. (July 10, 1941 – April 14, 2024) was an American politician, lobbyist and healthcare consultant. He served as the mayor of his hometown of Hopkinsville, Kentucky, from 1972 to 1975. Atkins was then elected Kentucky State Auditor in 1975, serving for one term from 1976 until 1980.

== Biography ==
Atkins was born in Hopkinsville, Kentucky, to George L. Atkins Sr. and Frances Shaver Atkins on July 10, 1941. His parents owned the family-run Atkins Dairy in Hopkinsville. He graduated from Hopkinsville High School in 1959. Atkins studied at the University of Kentucky, where he played basketball for the Kentucky Wildcats under Coach Adolph Rupp and received his bachelor's degree in 1963.

Atkins' political career began in 1972, when the Hopkinsville City Council appointed him as Mayor of Hopkinsville to fill a vacancy caused by the outgoing mayor. In 1975, Mayor Atkins launched his candidacy for Kentucky state auditor, which was being vacated by incumbent Mary Louise Foust. Atkins was elected state auditor in the 1975 general election and served for one term from 1976 to 1980.

In 1979, Atkins announced his candidacy for governor of Kentucky. However, he withdrew from the race prior to the Democratic primary and endorsed John Y. Brown Jr., who won the 1979 Kentucky gubernatorial election. Governor Brown appointed Atkins first as his finance secretary and then as cabinet secretary.

In 1983, Atkins ran for Lieutenant Governor of Kentucky, but was defeated by Steve Beshear in the Democratic primary election.

Atkins left active politics following his loss in 1983 and became the chief lobbyist for Humana in Kentucky. There, he helped lead Humana's 1990 lobbying efforts to weaken legal limits on potential Humana-owned hospital expansions in Louisville, Kentucky. The bill narrowly passed the Kentucky Senate by one vote, thanks to a deciding yes vote by state Senator Patti Weaver (D-Walton) after Atkins privately agreed to help Weaver obtain a job in state government in exchange for her support of the legislation. However, after Weaver failed the state personnel exam, she threatened to make the deal public. In response, Atkins funneled $10,000 to Weaver through an intermediary, state Sen. Helen Garrett of Paducah, who was later convicted of state government corruption unrelated to this particular case.

George Atkins pleaded guilty to mail fraud. He was sentenced by federal magistrate Judge Joseph Martin Hood to 24 weekends in prison, 400 hours of community service, and $10,000 in fines. The Humana corporation was fined $92,437 and apologized for its role in the scandal.

Atkins returned to the healthcare industry as a consultant based in Washington D.C.

George L. Atkins died on April 14, 2024, at the age of 82. He was survived by his wife, Donna Atkins, and three children.
