= 1980 United States Senate election in Kentucky =

- November 4, 1980
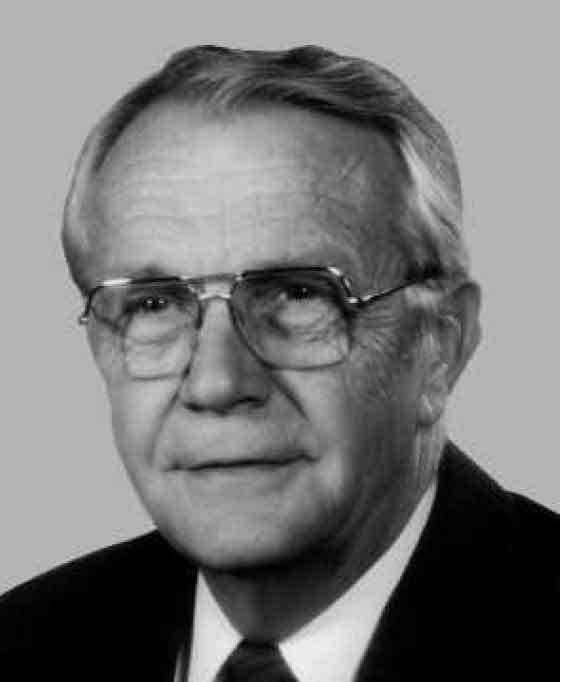

Nominee	Wendell Ford	Mary Louise Foust
Party	Democratic	Republican
Popular vote	720,891	386,029
Percentage	65.13%	34.87%
- County results Ford: 50–60% 60–70% 70–80% 80–90% Foust: 50–60% 60–70% 70–80%
U.S. senator before election
Wendell Ford
Democratic
Elected U.S. Senator
Wendell Ford
Democratic

The 1980 United States Senate election in Kentucky took place on November 4, 1980, concurrently with the U.S. presidential election as well as other elections to the United States Senate in other states as well as other elections to the United States House of Representatives and various state and local elections. Incumbent Democratic Senator Wendell Ford won re-election, defeating Republican nominee Mary Louise Foust.

== Democratic primary ==
=== Candidates ===
- Wendell Ford, incumbent Senator
- Flora Stuart

=== Results ===
Democratic Party primary results
Party	Candidate	Votes	%
Democratic	Wendell Ford (incumbent)	188,047	86.96%
Democratic	Flora Stuart	28,202	13.04%

== Republican primary ==
=== Candidates ===
- Mary Louise Foust, former state auditor
- Granville Thomas
- Jackson Andrews
- Tommy Klein
- Yale Lubkin
- DeSota Vaught

=== Results ===
Republican Party primary results
Party	Candidate	Votes	%
Republican	Mary Louise Foust	25,717	41.97%
Republican	Granville Thomas	10,246	16.72%
Republican	Jackson Andrews	8,382	13.68%
Republican	Tommy Klein	6,418	10.47%
Republican	Yale Lubkin	5,669	9.25%
Republican	DeSota Vaught	4,848	7.91%

== Results ==
General election results
Party	Candidate	Votes	%
Democratic	Wendell Ford (incumbent)	720,891	65.13%
Republican	Mary Louise Foust	386,029	34.87%
Democratic hold			

== See also ==
- 1980 United States Senate elections
