= 1979 Kentucky gubernatorial election =

- November 6, 1979
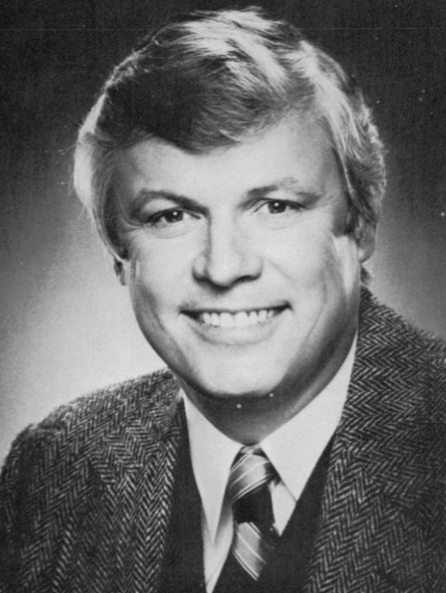

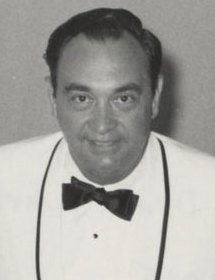
| Nominee | John Y. Brown Jr. | Louie Nunn |
| Party | Democratic | Republican |
| Popular vote | 558,088 | 380,085 |
| Percentage | 59.49% | 40.51% |
- Brown: 50–60% 60–70% 70–80% >90% Nunn: 50–60% 60–70% 70–80%
Governor before election
Julian Carroll
Democratic
Elected Governor
John Y. Brown Jr.
Democratic

The 1979 Kentucky gubernatorial election was held on November 6, 1979. Democratic nominee John Y. Brown Jr. defeated Republican nominee Louie Nunn with 59.49% of the vote.

== Primary elections ==
Primary elections were held on May 29, 1979.

=== Democratic primary ===
==== Candidates ====
- John Y. Brown Jr., businessman
- Harvey I. Sloane, former Mayor of Louisville
- Terry McBrayer, former State Representative
- Carroll Hubbard, U.S. Representative
- Thelma Stovall, incumbent Lieutenant Governor
- Lyle L. Willis
- George L. Atkins, Kentucky State Auditor
- Doris Shuja Binion
- John J. Weikel

==== Results ====
Democratic primary results by county. Map legend: Brown—50–60%; Brown—40–50%; Brown—30–40%; Brown—20–30%; Sloane—50–60%; Sloane—40–50%; Sloane—30–40%; Sloane—20–30%; McBrayer—70–80%; McBrayer—60–70%; McBrayer—50–60%; McBrayer—40–50%; McBrayer—30–40%; McBrayer—20–30%; Hubbard—60–70%; Hubbard—50–60%; Hubbard—40–50%; Hubbard—30–40%; Hubbard—20–30%; Stovall—40–50%

Democratic primary results
| Party | Candidate | Votes | % |
|---|---|---|---|
| Democratic | John Y. Brown Jr. | 165,188 | 29.14 |
| Democratic | Harvey I. Sloane | 139,713 | 24.65 |
| Democratic | Terry McBrayer | 131,530 | 23.21 |
| Democratic | Carroll Hubbard | 68,577 | 12.10 |
| Democratic | Thelma Stovall | 47,633 | 8.40 |
| Democratic | Lyle L. Willis | 5,349 | 0.94 |
| Democratic | George L. Atkins | 3,810 | 0.67 |
| Democratic | Doris Shuja Binion | 2,580 | 0.46 |
| Democratic | John J. Weikel | 2,436 | 0.43 |
| Total votes | | 566,816 | 100.00 |

=== Republican primary ===
==== Candidates ====
- Louie Nunn, former Governor
- Ray B. White
- Elmer Begley Jr.
- Thurman Jerome Hamlin

==== Results ====
Republican primary results
| Party | Candidate | Votes | % |
|---|---|---|---|
| Republican | Louie Nunn | 106,006 | 79.09 |
| Republican | Ray B. White | 19,414 | 14.49 |
| Republican | Elmer Begley Jr. | 5,106 | 3.81 |
| Republican | Thurman Jerome Hamlin | 3,499 | 2.61 |
| Total votes | | 134,025 | 100.00 |

== General election ==
=== Candidates ===
- John Y. Brown Jr., Democratic
- Louie Nunn, Republican

=== Results ===
1979 Kentucky gubernatorial election
| Party | Candidate | Votes | % | ±% |
|---|---|---|---|---|
| Democratic | John Y. Brown Jr. | 558,088 | 59.49 | −3.36 |
| Republican | Louie B. Nunn | 380,085 | 40.51 | +3.36 |
| Total votes | | 938,173 | 100.0 | N/A |
| Democratic hold | | | | |
