= Carroll Knicely =

American journalist

Kentucky Secretary of Commerce
- In office 1983–1987
- Governor: Martha Layne Collins; Wallace Wilkinson
- Preceded by: Bruce Lunsford

Personal details
- Born: Carroll Franklin Knicely; December 8, 1928 Staunton, Virginia, U.S.
- Died: November 2, 2006 (aged 77) Glasgow, Kentucky, U.S.
- Spouse: Evelyn Furr
- Children: 5

Carroll Franklin Knicely (December 8, 1928 – November 2, 2006) was editor and publisher of the Glasgow Daily Times for nearly 20 years (and later, its owner) and served under three Kentucky governors as commissioner and later commerce secretary.

== Career in publishing ==
Knicely started out as an apprentice linotype operator at The News-Virginian. In 1957, he relocated to Glasgow, Kentucky, as the president, editor and publisher of the Glasgow Daily Times. In 1963, Knicely and his wife Evelyn became the sole owners of the newspaper and of the Glasgow Publishing Corporation. He also held interests in several newspapers all over Kentucky and was part owner of a weekly newspaper in Westmoreland, Tennessee.

Knicely served as president of the Kentucky Press Association and president of the Kentucky Journalism Foundation. Under his leadership, the Glasgow Daily Times was named by the Kentucky Press Association as the best newspaper in its class in 1967.

== Western Kentucky University ==
Knicely was a supporter of Western Kentucky University, where he served on the board of regents beginning in 1976. He was instrumental in the success of the university's nationally known journalism department.

Knicely was a philanthropist, donating large sums of money to the Institute for Economic Development and Public Service at the university and to establish the Knicely Professorship in Leadership Studies and to create the Knicely Endowment, a permanent support fund to maintain and upgrade the institute.

The Carroll Knicely Conference Center at Western Kentucky University's Bowling Green campus is named in his honor.

== Civil service ==
Knicely served as Commerce secretary under Democratic governors Julian Carroll, Martha Layne Collins and Wallace G. Wilkinson. While serving in the state's Commerce Cabinet as commissioner, he helped secure the location of the General Motors Corvette plant in Bowling Green in 1981. Later, as commerce secretary, he was instrumental in bringing the Toyota plant to Georgetown, Kentucky, in 1985.

== Personal life ==
Knicely had two sons and three daughters, four grandchildren, and four great-grandchildren.
