= Park, Kentucky =

Unincorporated community in Kentucky, United States

Park
- Unincorporated community
- Location within the state of Kentucky Park (the United States)
- Coordinates: 37°8′25″N 85°46′29″W
- Country: United States
- State: Kentucky
- County: Barren
- Elevation: 718 ft (219 m)
- Time zone: UTC-5 (Eastern (EST))
  - Summer (DST): UTC-4 (EDT)
- GNIS feature ID: 508776

Park is a rural unincorporated community in eastern Barren County, Kentucky, United States. Park had a post office from 1853 to 1958.

== Notable people ==
- Louie B. Nunn, Governor of Kentucky
