= 1963 Kentucky gubernatorial election =

- November 5, 1963
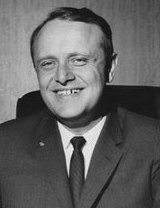

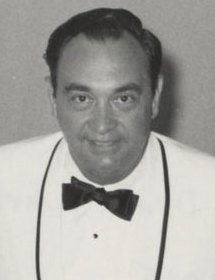
Nominee	Ned Breathitt	Louie Nunn
Party	Democratic	Republican
Popular vote	449,551	436,496
Percentage	50.74%	49.26%
- Breathitt: 50–60% 60–70% 70–80% 80–90% Nunn: 50–60% 60–70% 70–80% 80–90%
Governor before election
Bert Combs
Democratic
Elected Governor
Ned Breathitt
Democratic

The 1963 Kentucky gubernatorial election was held on November 5, 1963. Democratic nominee Ned Breathitt defeated Republican nominee Louie Nunn with 50.74% of the vote.

== Primary elections ==
Primary elections were held on May 28, 1963.

=== Democratic primary ===
==== Candidates ====
- Ned Breathitt, former State Representative
- Happy Chandler, former Governor
- Mary Louise Foust, former Kentucky State Auditor
- Wilton Benge Cupp

==== Results ====
Democratic primary results
Party	Candidate	Votes	%
Democratic	Ned Breathitt	318,858	53.76
Democratic	Happy Chandler	256,451	43.24
Democratic	Mary Louise Foust	13,416	2.26
Democratic	Wilton Benge Cupp	4,387	0.74
Total votes		593,112	100.00

=== Republican primary ===
==== Candidates ====
- Louie Nunn, former Barren County judge
- Jesse N. R. Cecil

==== Results ====
Republican primary results
Party	Candidate	Votes	%
Republican	Louie Nunn	77,455	88.53
Republican	Jesse N. R. Cecil	10,039	11.47
Total votes		87,494	100.00

== General election ==
=== Candidates ===
- Ned Breathitt, Democratic
- Louie Nunn, Republican

=== Results ===
1963 Kentucky gubernatorial election
Party	Candidate	Votes	%	±%
Democratic	Edward T. "Ned" Breathitt	449,551	50.74	−9.82
Republican	Louie B. Nunn	436,496	49.26	+9.82
Total votes		886,047	100.0	N/A
Democratic hold				
