= Viola Davis Brown =

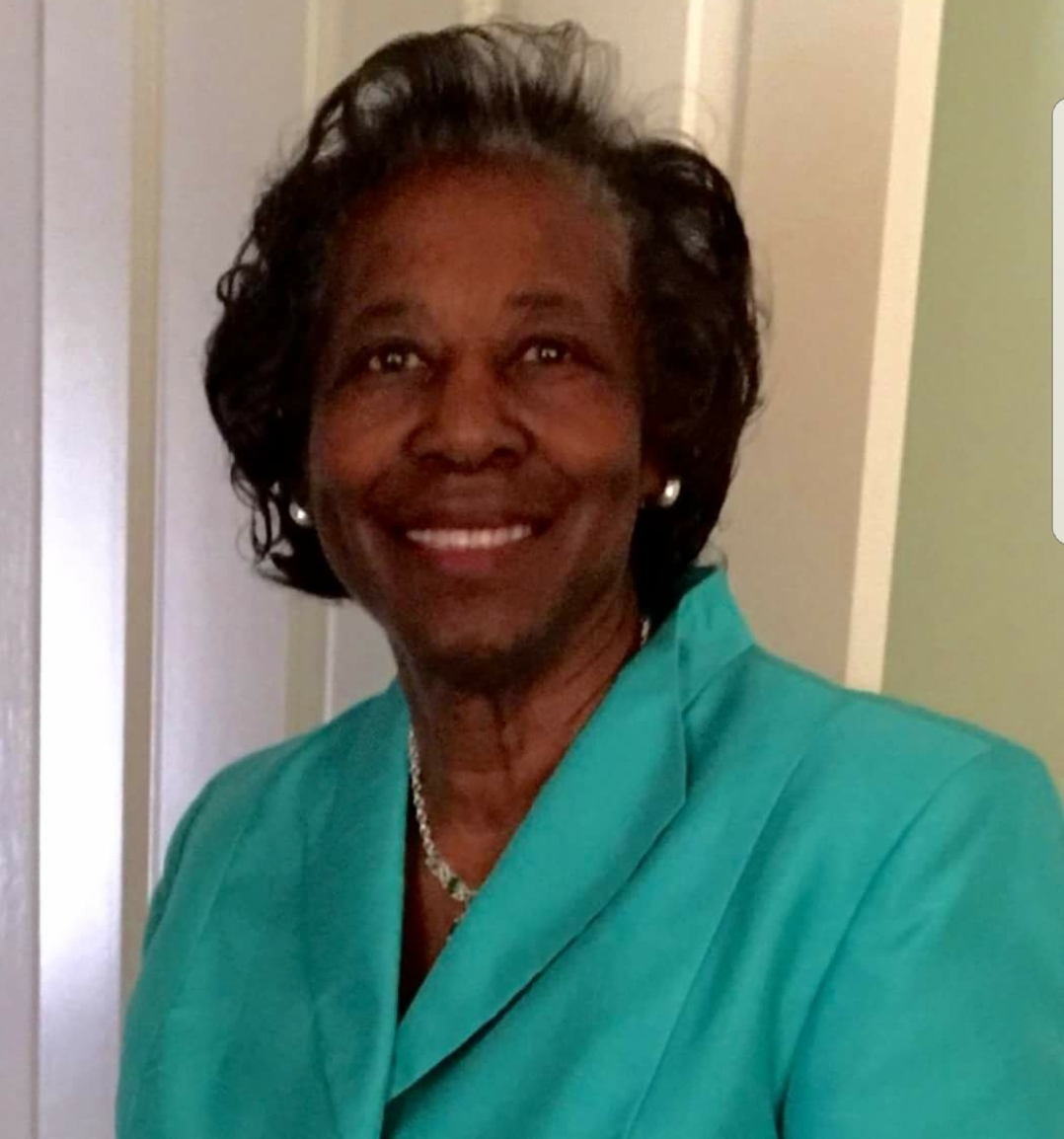
- Born: Viola Davis; April 8, 1936; Lexington, Kentucky
- Died: December 22, 2017 (aged 81); Lexington, Kentucky
- Occupations: Nurse and State Agency Administrator
- Spouse: Percy H. Brown (m. 1957–2017)
- Children: 5

Viola Davis Brown (April 8, 1936 – December 22, 2017) born in Lexington, Kentucky, was a participant in the civil rights movement with contributions to public health and medical education in Kentucky.

== Personal life and education ==
Viola Davis is the daughter of Donnie and Mable (Bryan) Davis. Davis married Percy H. Brown on June 29, 1957. Percy and Viola have five children together: Clarence, Michael, Bonnie, Donna, and Linda. In 1959, Mrs. Brown became the first to attend the Nazareth School of Nursing affiliated with St. Joseph Hospital in Lexington, Kentucky. Viola Brown graduated in 1959 and was soon appointed to the position of Supervisor of Nursing. In 1960, this was the first promotion of its kind for an African American in Kentucky.

In 1972, Brown received a degree from the University of Kentucky to become a certified primary care nurse practitioner as part of a pilot program at the university associated with the College of Medicine and the Hunter Foundation for Health Care. She was one of two African Americans in Lexington to become the first RNs. Brown's certification includes that of a registered nurse of Kentucky and an advanced nurse practitioner.

== Career ==
Concluding her education at the University of Kentucky, Viola Brown worked as an office nurse, at Holloway, Playforth and Archer, P.S.C., of Lexington from 1966 to 1972. Shortly thereafter, Brown became a Primary Care and Family Nurse Practitioner for Hunter Health Care, Inc. of Lexington as well.

Viola D. Brown was appointed by Kentucky Governor John Y. Brown Jr., as Executive Director of the Office of Public Health Nursing for the Kentucky Department of Health Services in Frankfort, Kentucky in 1980. Brown became the first African American nurse to lead a state office of public health nursing in the United States. Brown also became the Principal Assistant to the Kentucky Commissioner of Health in 1982, as the Chief Nurse Representative to all branches of state government, local health departments, health professions and the community located in Frankfort.

Governor Wallace Wilkinson appointed Brown to be the Project Coordinator of the Governor's Interdisciplinary Task force on Nursing Shortages in 1988. The number of public health nurses in Kentucky grew from 350 to 1400 during Brown's time as Principal Assistant. Her tenure in the position of Principal Assistant to the Commissioner extended through the administration of five governors and three State Commissioners.

== Awards and accolades ==
From 1981 to 1982, Viola Brown was a member of the Dean Search Committee at the University of Louisville School of Nursing. Beginning in 1984, Brown became a preceptor to nursing students at the University Of Kentucky College Of Nursing and at the College of Allied Health at the University of North Carolina at Chapel Hill. Brown was also selected as a nurse consultant to the Office of the Secretary of the Community Human Resources. In 1991, Brown became a recipient of the Recognition Award from Jefferson Community College of Louisville, Kentucky. That same year, Brown was appointed to be the State Minority Liaison to the Office of Minority Health and Kentucky Minority Health Advanced Council. Brown also became a member of the Alzheimer's Committee of Community Human Resources and served on the Minority Elderly Report Committee in 1992. Brown participated in the Steering Committee of the Mississippi Delta Environmental Health Project in 1994 (see the full-text of the Mississippi Delta Project: Health and Environment Prospectus, 1995).

Viola Davis Brown retired on August 31, 1999, as the Director of Public Health Nursing. She served as part of the Kentucky Department for Public Health from 1980 to 1999. Mrs. Brown was influential in assisting Advanced Registered Nurse Practitioners in obtaining prescriptive authority. The Kentucky Association for Advanced Registered Nurse Practitioners recognized Brown in 1998 with their Nurse Practitioners Award. She promoted public health throughout the United States with an active role in the Association of State and Territorial Directors of Nursing (now the Association of Public Health Nurses). At the 1999 annual convention of the Association of State and Territorial Directors of Nursing, the Kentucky Nurses Association honored Viola Davis Brown as "Distinguished Nurse of the Year". Having she held the post of Executive Director of the Office of Public Health Nursing for 19 years, Viola Brown was inducted into the University of Kentucky College of Public Health Hall of Fame in 2004. Viola Brown has been a guest lecturer at the University of Alabama at Birmingham, Berea College, Kentucky State University, Murray State University, and Georgetown College.

Viola D. Brown's membership within community partners and national organizations include the American Public Health Association, American Nurses Association and the Kentucky Public Health Association from which she received the Dr. Russell E. Teague award in 1991. Additionally, Brown participated in activities of the Southern Health Association, Kentucky Nurses Association, and the Kentucky League for Nursing which recognized her with the Special Recognition award in 1989.

== Resources ==
- "Kentucky Epidemiologic Notes and Reports" (PDF). Newsmakers. 34 (10). Frankfort, KY: Cabinet for Health Services Department for Public Health, Division of Epidemiology and Health Planning. November 1999: 6.
- "Hall of Fame Past Inductees: Viola Brown". Lexington, KY: University of Kentucky College of Public Health. 2011.
- "Brown, Viola Davis: Her essay won a prize, but she couldn't go to the ceremony." Lexington Herald-Leader A-1 col. 1–4 and A-6. 2004.
- Viola Davis Brown." Marquis Who's Who. New Providence, NJ: Marquis Who's Who, Inc. (2010).
- Reinette Jones, "Viola Davis Brown". Notable Kentucky African Americans Database. University of Kentucky Libraries, Lexington, Kentucky. Retrieved 26 February 2015.
