= Terry McBrayer =

American politician (1937–2020)

Majority Leader of the Kentucky House of Representatives
- In office January 6, 1970 – January 4, 1972
- Preceded by: Fred H. Morgan
- Succeeded by: John Swinford

Speaker pro tempore of the Kentucky House of Representatives
- In office January 2, 1968 – January 6, 1970
- Preceded by: Mitchell B. Denham
- Succeeded by: Norbert Blume

Member of the Kentucky House of Representatives
- In office January 1, 1966 – January 1, 1976
- Preceded by: Pete Nicholls
- Succeeded by: Ron Cyrus
- Constituency: 76th district (1966–1972); 98th district (1972–1976)

Personal details
- Born: September 1, 1937
- Died: October 11, 2020 (aged 83)
- Party: Democratic

Walter Terry McBrayer (September 1, 1937 – October 11, 2020) was an American lobbyist, attorney, and Democratic politician.

McBrayer was born in Ironton, Ohio. He lived in Greenup, Kentucky and was the senior partner and lead lobbyist for the influential McBrayer, McGinnis, Leslie & Kirkland law firm. He was a graduate of Morehead State University and Louis D. Brandeis School of Law at the University of Louisville.

McBrayer served in the Kentucky House of Representatives, representing Kentucky's 98th legislative district (Greenup County), from 1966 until his retirement in 1976. During his tenure, McBrayer was elected Speaker Pro-Tempore (1968–1969) and Majority Leader (1970–1972). He was an unsuccessful candidate for governor in 1979, losing in the Democratic primary after a third-place finish (26% of the vote) in a nine-way race to John Y. Brown Jr. (the nominee and eventual winner of the general election) and Harvey Sloane.

McBrayer served as President Clinton's Authorized Representative for Kentucky during the 1992 and 1996 campaigns. In 1995, McBrayer was elected chairman of the Kentucky Democratic Party and was a committeeman for the Democratic National Committee.

McBrayer died on October 11, 2020, in Lexington, Kentucky, aged 83 of cancer.

Kentucky House of Representatives
Preceded by Pete Nicholls	Member of the Kentucky House of Representatives from the 76th district 1966–1972	Succeeded by Bart N. Peak
Preceded by Joe W. Haney	Member of the Kentucky House of Representatives from the 98th district 1972–1976	Succeeded by Ron Cyrus
