= 1972 United States Senate election in Kentucky =

- November 7, 1972
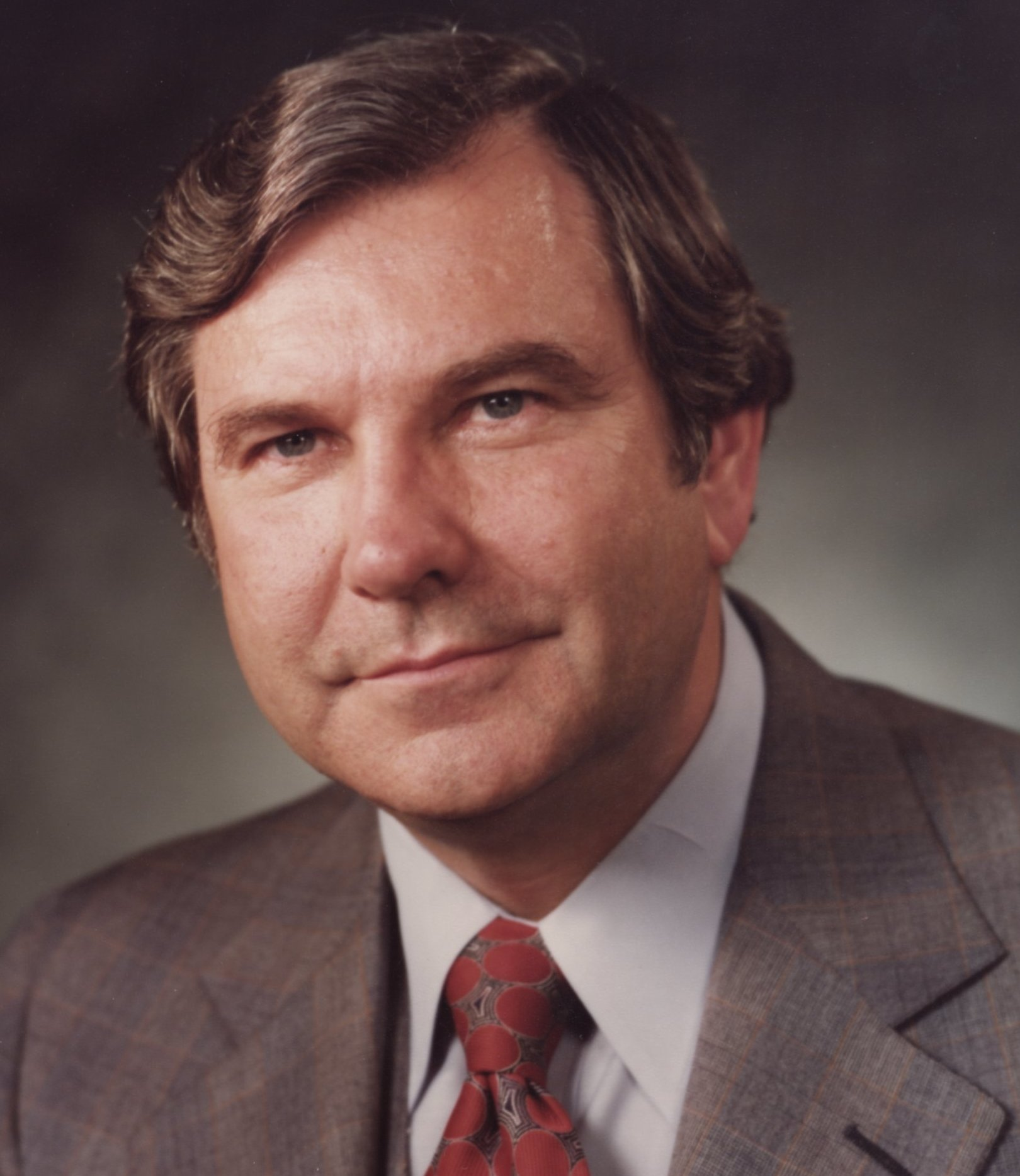

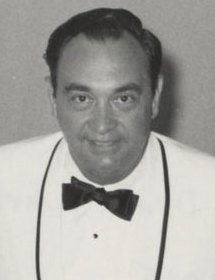
Nominee	Walter Dee Huddleston	Louie Nunn
Party	Democratic	Republican
Popular vote	528,550	494,337
Percentage	50.93%	47.63%
- County results Huddleston: 40–50% 50–60% 60–70% 70–80% Nunn: 40–50% 50–60% 60–70% 70–80% 80–90%
U.S. senator before election
John Sherman Cooper
Republican
Elected U.S. Senator
Walter Dee Huddleston
Democratic

The 1972 United States Senate election in Kentucky took place on November 7, 1972. Incumbent Republican Senator John Sherman Cooper retired, and Democratic State Senator Walter Dee Huddleston narrowly won the open seat over former Republican Governor Louie Nunn.

== Republican primary ==
=== Candidates ===
- W. Howard Clay
- Robert E. Gable, businessman and commissioner of State Parks of Kentucky
- Thurman Jerome Hamlin, perennial candidate from London
- Louie Nunn, former governor of Kentucky (1967–71)
- George Wooton

=== Results ===
Republican primary results
Party	Candidate	Votes	%
Republican	Louie Nunn	57,348	69.71%
Republican	Robert E. Gable	18,107	22.01%
Republican	W. Howard Clay	2,786	3.39%
Republican	George Wooton	2,716	3.30%
Republican	Thurman Jerome Hamlin	1,312	1.60%
Total votes		82,269	100.00%

== Democratic primary ==
=== Candidates ===
- Sandy Hockensmith
- Walter Dee Huddleston, state senator from Elizabethtown
- Willis V. Johnson
- Charles Van Winkle
- James E. Wallace

=== Results ===
Democratic primary results
Party	Candidate	Votes	%
Democratic	Walter Dee Huddleston	106,144	71.60%
Democratic	Sandy Hockensmith	14,786	9.97%
Democratic	James E. Wallace	11,290	7.62%
Democratic	Willis V. Johnson	8,727	5.89%
Democratic	Charles Van Winkle	7,306	4.93%
Total votes		148,253	100.00%

== General election ==
=== Results ===
General election results
Party	Candidate	Votes	%
Democratic	Walter Dee Huddleston	528,550	50.93%
Republican	Louie Nunn	494,337	47.63%
American	Helen Breeden	8,707	0.84%
People's	Walter Bartley	6,267	0.60%
Total votes		1,037,861	100.00%

== See also ==
- 1972 United States Senate elections
