= Louie Nunn =

52nd governor of Kentucky

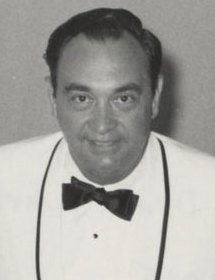
- Nunn in 1969

52nd Governor of Kentucky
- In office December 12, 1967 – December 7, 1971
- Lieutenant: Wendell Ford
- Preceded by: Ned Breathitt
- Succeeded by: Wendell Ford

Personal details
- Born: Louie Broady Nunn; March 8, 1924 Park, Kentucky, U.S.
- Died: January 29, 2004 (aged 79) Versailles, Kentucky, U.S.
- Resting place: Cosby Cemetery; LeGrande, Kentucky, U.S.
- Party: Republican
- Spouse: Beula Cornelius Aspley (m. 1950; div. 1994)
- Children: 2, including Steve
- Education: Western Kentucky University (BA); University of Cincinnati; University of Louisville (LLB)

Military service
- Allegiance: United States
- Branch/service: United States Army
- Years of service: 1943–1945
- Rank: Corporal
- Unit: 97th Infantry Division; Army Medical Corps
- Battles/wars: World War II

Louie Broady Nunn (March 8, 1924 – January 29, 2004) was an American politician who served as the 52nd governor of Kentucky. Elected in 1967, he was the only Republican to hold the office between the end of Simeon Willis's term in 1947 and the election of Ernie Fletcher in 2003.

After rendering non-combat service in World War II and graduating from law school, Nunn entered local politics, becoming the first Republican county judge in the history of Barren County, Kentucky. He worked on the campaigns of Republican candidates for national office, including John Sherman Cooper, Thruston Morton, and Dwight D. Eisenhower. He was the Republican nominee for governor in 1963, but ultimately lost a close election to Democrat Ned Breathitt. An executive order signed by Governor Bert T. Combs that desegregated Kentucky's public services became a major issue in the campaign. Nunn vowed to repeal the order if elected, while Breathitt promised to continue it.

In 1967, Nunn ran for governor again. After defeating Marlow Cook in the Republican gubernatorial primary, he eked out a victory over Democrat Henry Ward. The state offices were split between Democrats and Republicans, and Nunn was saddled with a Democratic lieutenant governor, Wendell Ford. Despite a Democratic majority in the General Assembly, Nunn was able to enact most of his priorities, including tax increases that funded improvements to the state park system and the construction of a statewide network of mental health centers. He oversaw the transition of Northern Kentucky University from a community college to a senior institution and brought the University of Louisville into the state university system. The later years of his administration were marred by race riots in Louisville and a violent protest against the Vietnam War at the University of Kentucky. Following his term as governor, he lost to Walter Dee Huddleston in the 1972 senatorial election and John Y. Brown Jr. in the 1979 gubernatorial election. In his later years, he sometimes supported the political ambitions of his son, Steve, and advocated for the legalization of industrial hemp in Kentucky. He died of a heart attack on January 29, 2004.

== Early life ==
Louie Broady Nunn was born in Park, Kentucky – a small community on the border of Barren and Metcalfe counties – on March 8, 1924. His first name, Louie, honored a deceased friend of his father's; his middle name, Broady, was a surname in his mother's family. Louie was the youngest of the four sons born to Waller Harrison and Mary (Roberts) Nunn; their youngest child, Virginia, was their only daughter. The Nunns were farmers and operated a general store, though Waller suffered from a congenital heart condition and severe arthritis and was limited to light chores. The eldest brother, Lee Roy, became an influential campaigner and fundraiser for the Republican Party.

Nunn obtained the first eight years of his education in a one-room, one-teacher schoolhouse in Park. During his teenage years, he gave himself a hernia while lifting a heavy piece of farm equipment. This, combined with his father's health history, may have contributed to back pain issues that plagued him for most of his life. In 1938, he matriculated to Hiseville High School. He earned a Bachelor of Arts degree at Bowling Green Business University, now Western Kentucky University.

After the bombing of Pearl Harbor on December 7, 1941, Nunn departed for Cincinnati, Ohio, to take flying lessons in hopes of becoming a B-17 pilot. By the time he finished his flight training, however, the Army had discontinued its air cadet program. On June 2, 1943, he enlisted in the Army and received his recruit training at Fort Wolters near Fort Worth, Texas. He was transferred numerous times. First, he was stationed at Sheppard Air Force Base near Wichita Falls, Texas. Next, he was assigned to the 97th Infantry Division, then received additional training at Fort Leonard Wood in Missouri. Finally, he transferred to the Army Medical Corps, but his back injury flared up, and he received a medical discharge on September 13, 1945. He held the rank of corporal at the time of his discharge.

Following his military duty, Nunn pursued a pre-law degree at the University of Cincinnati. Three years later, he matriculated to the University of Louisville School of Law where he was a classmate of future congressman Marlow Cook. Nunn earned his Bachelor of Laws degree in 1950. He opened his legal practice in Glasgow, Kentucky, in September 1950.

On October 12, 1950, Nunn married Beula Cornelius Aspley, a divorcee from Bond, Kentucky. The couple had two children – Jennie Lou, born in 1951, and Steve, born in 1952. Aspley also had three children from her first marriage. Nunn left the Methodist denomination in which he had been raised after marrying Aspley, joining her as a member of the Christian Church (Disciples of Christ).

== Political career ==
On June 17, 1953, Nunn declared as a Republican candidate for county judge and was ultimately the only Republican to declare. In the Democratic primary, one of the challengers charged that the incumbent had misused his office for personal gain. In the wake of the investigation, a group of disgruntled Democrats formed an organization to elect Nunn, who defeated his Democratic challenger by a vote of 5,171 to 4,378, becoming the first Republican elected county judge in the history of the heavily Democratic county.

In 1956, Nunn served as statewide campaign manager for Dwight D. Eisenhower's presidential bid, as well as the senatorial campaigns of John Sherman Cooper and Thruston Morton. The Kentucky Junior Chamber of Commerce named him "Young Man of the Year" in 1956. He was not a candidate for re-election as county judge in 1957 but was appointed as city attorney for the city of Glasgow in 1958. He considered running for governor in 1959 but became convinced it would be a bad year for Republicans and did not make the race. He managed successful re-election campaigns for Senator Cooper in 1960 and Senator Morton in 1962. He also managed the state campaign of presidential candidate Richard Nixon in 1960. Although John F. Kennedy won the election, Nixon carried Kentucky 54% to 46%.

Nunn was the Republican nominee for governor of Kentucky in 1963. During the campaign, he attacked an executive order issued by sitting Democratic governor Bert T. Combs that desegregated public accommodations in the state. Calling the order "a dictatorial edict of questionable constitutionality", Nunn charged that it had been dictated by U.S. Attorney General Robert F. Kennedy. In a television appearance, Nunn displayed a copy of the order and declared "My first act will be to abolish this." The New Republic accused him of conducting "the first outright segregationist campaign in Kentucky". He lost the election to Democrat Ned Breathitt by a margin of just over 13,000 votes.

=== Governor of Kentucky ===
In 1967, Nunn faced his old classmate, Jefferson County Judge Marlow Cook, in Kentucky's first Republican gubernatorial primary in many years. Nunn attacked Cook as a "liberal, former New Yorker", and some of his supporters referred to Cook's "Jewish backers". The injection of antisemitism into the campaign drew criticism from Senator John Sherman Cooper, who threw his support to Cook. Nunn also attacked Cook for his Catholic faith, a tactic that proved particularly effective with the state's Protestant voters. In a close vote, Nunn defeated Cook to secure the nomination.

Nunn then faced Democrat Henry Ward in the general election. During the campaign, Nunn charged that Democrats wanted to raise taxes to pay for administrative inefficiencies. He also played up divisions within the Democratic party, and was endorsed by two-time former Democratic Governor Happy Chandler. Nunn allied himself closely with the national Republican campaign against Lyndon B. Johnson, bringing several prominent Republicans to the state to speak for him. He won the election by a vote of 453,323 (51%) to 425,674 (48%), even though half of the other state offices went to Democrats, including the lieutenant governorship, won by Wendell Ford.

The General Assembly was controlled by Democrats, but Nunn was able to pass most of his agenda. Despite a campaign promise not to raise taxes when the outgoing Breathitt administration projected a shortfall of $24 million in the state budget, Nunn convinced the General Assembly to pass an increase in the motor vehicle license fee from $5.00 to $12.50 and raise the state sales tax from three percent to five percent. Nunn's budget focused on increased funding for education, mental health, and economic development. In the 1970 legislative session, the General Assembly enacted Nunn's proposals to eliminate taxes on prescription drugs and the use fee charged on vehicles transferred within families, but rejected his plans to reduce the income tax for low-income families and increase tax credits for the blind and the elderly.

Nunn oversaw the entry of the University of Louisville into the state's public university system. Fulfilling a campaign promise, he helped transform Northern Kentucky Community College into Northern Kentucky State College (which later became Northern Kentucky University), a four-year institution and member of the state university system. Historian Lowell H. Harrison argued that these actions diluted state support to existing higher education institutions. Nunn also supported the newly created Kentucky Educational Television.

Nunn doubled the accommodations in the state park system. Barren River Lake State Resort Park was completed during his tenure, and three other parks were planned and funded during his administration. He also greatly improved the state mental health system. Under his leadership, a statewide network of 22 mental health centers was completed, and all four state psychiatric hospitals were accredited for the first time. Nunn called the revamping of the state mental health system his proudest accomplishment as governor. There was not total agreement between Nunn and the legislature, however. The governor vetoed one-quarter of the bills passed in the 1968 legislative session and 14 percent of those passed in the 1970 session. An open housing bill became law without Nunn's signature, and he also refused to sign the 1970 state budget as a form of protest. (Unsigned bills become law after ten days under the Kentucky Constitution, in contrast to the pocket veto provision in the federal constitution.)

A supporter of President Nixon's law-and-order philosophies, Nunn called out the National Guard to break up violent protests in the state. In May 1968, he sent the Guard to Louisville to break up race-related protests that followed peaceful civil rights marches. This action was criticized by civil rights leaders across the state. In May 1970, Nunn again dispatched the Guard to quell protests against the Vietnam War at the University of Kentucky, and imposed a curfew that interfered with final examinations. The latter protest culminated in the burning of one of the university's ROTC buildings.

From 1968 to 1969, Nunn served on the executive committee of the National Governors' Conference and, in 1971, chaired the Republican Governors Association. The Courier-Journal said of Nunn's administration "On the whole, his management of the state's finances has been sound. ... [H]e took a general fund facing a deficit, restored it to solvency, and kept it healthy. No scandals have marred the Nunn record. He chose able men to direct his revenue and finance departments, and their efficiency saved the state millions of dollars." Historian Thomas D. Clark called Nunn the strongest of Kentucky's eight Republican governors. At the time, Kentucky governors could not serve consecutive terms; in the 1971 race, Nunn backed Tom Emberton, who lost to Ford.

== Later career ==
Following his term as governor, Nunn opened a law practice in Lexington. He campaigned for the retiring Cooper's seat in 1972, losing to Democrat Walter Dee Huddleston (known as Dee Huddleston), a state senator who had managed Ford's campaign. His loss came despite a landslide victory for Richard Nixon in the state and was generally blamed on his advocacy of raising the sales tax to 5 percent from 3 percent in 1968. He continued working on behalf of Republican candidates and backed Ronald Reagan's primary challenge to incumbent Gerald Ford in 1975. His last run for office came in 1979 when he was again the Republican nominee for governor against Democrat John Y. Brown Jr. He decried the excessive spending, expanding government, and increased state employment that had occurred under Democratic administrations. He also attacked Brown for his playboy image (he was married to former Miss America Phyllis George) and his refusal to release his tax returns, as well as his inexperience in government. Despite these attacks, Nunn lost by a vote of 558,008 to 381,278 and returned to his legal practice.

In the 1980s, Nunn served on the boards of regents of Morehead State University and Kentucky State University. He served as a lecturer at Western Kentucky University, and received the Distinguished Alumni Award from the University of Louisville in 1999. During the late 1980s, he criticized Senator Mitch McConnell, one of the emerging leaders of the state's Republican party, for not doing more to support other Republicans in their bids for office; McConnell maintained that he had to focus on his own reelection campaign in 1990. In 1988, Nunn unsuccessfully challenged Congressman Jim Bunning in his bid to retain his position as Kentucky's Republican national committeeman.

In 1994, Nunn's wife Beula filed for divorce from a hospital bed where she lay dying of cancer. She claimed she was trying to preserve some of her estate for her children. A Metcalfe County judge granted the divorce, but Nunn challenged the ruling, and it was later set aside. Some property issues were still pending at the time of Beula's death in 1995. During the divorce proceedings, Nunn's son Steve sided with his mother, causing a rift between him and his father. A 1994 letter from the elder Nunn alleged that Steve Nunn physically and verbally abused Louie Nunn and other members of his family. The letter was discovered in 2009 when Steve Nunn was charged with the murder of his former fiancée, Amanda Ross. The letter also quoted Louie Nunn of saying "you have no family" to Steve, indicating that their relationship had deteriorated long before Louie's death, allegedly because of the younger Nunn's abusiveness.

In 1999, Nunn again considered a bid for governor, precluding a potential bid by his son, Steve, a state representative from Glasgow. He cited personal and health issues for not making the race. In 2000, he backed the presidential campaign of Senator John McCain. Nunn reconciled with his son, and when Steve ran for governor in 2003, Louie supported him. After Steve Nunn ran third in a four-way primary, the elder Nunn supported the Republican nominee, Ernie Fletcher, hosting a fundraiser for him.

Nunn also became an advocate of legalizing industrial hemp in Kentucky, writing, "Frankly, I was opposed to the legalization of hemp for years because I had been of the opinion hemp was marijuana. I was short-sighted in my thinking, and I was wrong." In 2000, Nunn secured an acquittal for the actor Woody Harrelson, who came to Lee County, Kentucky, and planted hemp seeds in open defiance of Kentucky's law forbidding the cultivation of hemp. Later, he traveled to South Dakota where, at the base of Mount Rushmore, he publicly presented an Oglala Lakota leader with bales of hemp after the tribe's crop was confiscated by officers from the federal Drug Enforcement Administration.

Louie B. Nunn died of a heart attack at his home just outside Versailles, Kentucky, on January 29, 2004, hours after hosting a luncheon with labor leaders seeking help in dealing with the newly elected Fletcher administration. He was buried at the Cosby Methodist Church cemetery in Hart County, Kentucky. The Cumberland Parkway was renamed the Louie B. Nunn Cumberland Parkway in 2000, and the main lodge at the Barren River Lake State Resort Park is also named in Nunn's honor.

== See also ==
- Louie B. Nunn Center for Oral History

Party political offices
Preceded by John Robsion	Republican nominee for Governor of Kentucky; 1963, 1967	Succeeded by Tom Emberton
Preceded by Ronald Reagan	Chair of the Republican Governors Association; 1970–1971	Succeeded by William Milliken
Preceded by John Sherman Cooper	Republican nominee for U.S. Senator from Kentucky (Class 2); 1972	Succeeded by Louie Guenthner
Preceded by Bob Gable	Republican nominee for Governor of Kentucky; 1979	Succeeded by Jim Bunning
Political offices
Preceded by Ned Breathitt	Governor of Kentucky; 1967–1971	Succeeded by Wendell Ford
