= John Y. Brown Jr. =

American politician and entrepreneur (1933–2022)

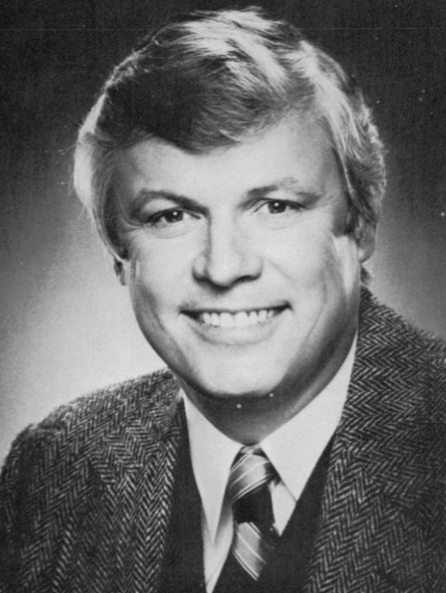
- Brown c. 1978–1982

55th Governor of Kentucky
- In office December 11, 1979 – December 13, 1983
- Lieutenant: Martha Layne Collins
- Preceded by: Julian Carroll
- Succeeded by: Martha Layne Collins

Personal details
- Born: John Young Brown Jr. December 28, 1933 Lexington, Kentucky, U.S.
- Died: November 22, 2022 (aged 88) Lexington, Kentucky, U.S.
- Party: Democratic
- Spouses: Eleanor Durall (m. 1960; div. 1977); Phyllis George (m. 1979; div. 1998); Jill Roach (m. 1998; div. 2003)
- Children: 5, including John and Pamela
- Parent: John Y. Brown Sr. (father)
- Education: University of Kentucky (BA, LLB)

Military service
- Branch/service: United States Army
- Years of service: 1959–1965
- Unit: U.S. Army Reserve

John Young Brown Jr. (December 28, 1933 – November 22, 2022) was an American politician and entrepreneur from Kentucky. He served as the 55th governor of Kentucky from 1979 to 1983, and built Kentucky Fried Chicken (KFC) into a multimillion-dollar restaurant chain.

The son of United States Representative John Y. Brown Sr., Brown's talent for business became evident in college, where he made a substantial amount of money selling Encyclopædia Britannica sets. After briefly practicing law with his father, he purchased Kentucky Fried Chicken from founder Harland Sanders in 1964. Brown turned the company into a worldwide success and sold his interest in the company for a huge profit in 1971. He then invested in several other restaurant ventures, but none matched the success of KFC. During the 1970s, he also owned, at various times, three professional basketball teams: the American Basketball Association's Kentucky Colonels, and the National Basketball Association's Boston Celtics and Buffalo Braves (currently the Los Angeles Clippers).

Despite having previously shown little inclination toward politics, Brown surprised political observers by declaring his candidacy for governor in the 1979 election. With the state and nation facing difficult economic times, Brown promised to run the state government like a business. A strong media campaign funded by his personal fortune allowed him to win the Democratic primary and go on to defeat former Republican governor Louie B. Nunn in the general election. Because he owed few favors to established political leaders, he appointed many successful businesspeople to state posts instead of making political appointments. Following through on his campaign promise to make more diverse appointments, he named a woman and an African American to his cabinet. During his tenure, Brown exerted less influence over the legislature than previous governors and was frequently absent from the state, leaving Lieutenant Governor Martha Layne Collins as acting governor for more than one-quarter of his term. He briefly competed for the U.S. Senate after his gubernatorial term in the 1984 election but withdrew from the race after only six weeks, citing health issues. He continued to invest in business ventures, the most high profile of which was Kenny Rogers Roasters, a wood-roasted chicken restaurant he founded with country music star Kenny Rogers.

Brown married three times, the second time to former Miss America Phyllis George. Among his children are news anchor Pamela Ashley Brown and former Secretary of State of Kentucky John Young Brown III.

== Early life ==
Brown was born on December 28, 1933, in Lexington, Kentucky. He was the only son of five children born to John Y. and Dorothy Inman Brown. His father was a member of the United States House of Representatives from Kentucky and a member of the Kentucky General Assembly for nearly three decades, including a term as Speaker of the House. John Sr. was named for, but not related to, the nineteenth century governor of the same name. A 1979 People magazine article recounts that the elder Brown's nine unsuccessful political races – for either governor or the U.S. Senate – took a toll on his family and left his mother resentful of all the money spent on campaigns.

Brown attended Lafayette High School in Lexington, where he was a seventeen-time letterman in various sports. During one summer, his father expressed disappointment that he had decided to spend the summer selling vacuum cleaners instead of working on a road construction crew with the rest of his football teammates. Motivated by his father's disapproval, Brown averaged $1,000 in monthly commissions from vacuum cleaner sales. After high school, Brown matriculated at the University of Kentucky, where he earned a bachelor's degree in 1957 and a law degree in 1960. As an undergraduate, he was a member of the golf team and Phi Delta Theta fraternity. While in law school, he made as much as $25,000 a year selling Encyclopædia Britannica sets and employed a sales crew made up of classmates to increase his profits.

Brown joined his father's law practice after earning his law degree. From 1959 to 1965, he also served in the United States Army Reserve. He was legal counsel for Paul Hornung when Hornung was suspended for the 1963 National Football League season for gambling. After only a few years, Brown left his father's law firm and began a career in business.

== Business ventures ==
In 1960, Brown married Eleanor Bennett Durall and had three children including John Young Brown III, Eleanor Faris, and Sandra Bennett. He got his wife involved in managing a barbecue restaurant; upon seeing its success, he became convinced of the financial potential of the fast food industry. During a 1963 political breakfast, Brown met Colonel Harland Sanders, the founder of Kentucky Fried Chicken (KFC), and the two discussed selling Sanders' chicken in Brown's chain of barbecue restaurants. By 1964, Brown persuaded Jack C. Massey to purchase KFC from Sanders for $2 million (equivalent to $20,761,803 in 2025). The investment group changed the restaurant's format from the diner-style restaurant envisioned by Sanders to a fast-food take out model. Giving all their restaurants a distinct red-and-white striped color pattern, the group opened over 1,500 restaurants, including locations in all 50 U.S. states and several international locations. By 1967, KFC had become the nation's sixth-largest restaurant chain by volume and first offered its stock for public purchase in 1969.

For his work with KFC, Brown was named one of the Outstanding Young Men of America by the Junior Chamber of Commerce in 1966; the following year, the Chamber named him one of the Outstanding Civic Leaders of America. Eventually, he became a member of both the Kentucky and Louisville Chambers of Commerce. The Louisville Junior Chamber of Commerce honored him as Louisville's Outstanding Young Man in 1969, and he was inducted into the University of Kentucky Alumni Association Hall of Distinguished Alumni on November 6, 1970.

In 1971, Brown sold his interest in KFC to Heublein for $284 million (equivalent to $2.257764996×10^{9} in 2025). Using some of the profits from the KFC sale, Brown and some associates bought the Miami-based Lum's chain of restaurants from its founders, Stuart and Clifford S. Perlman, for $4 million. Of the 340-outlet beer-and-hot-dog chain, Brown said, "They did not have very good food. I figured that upgrading it would be my first task." Accordingly, he hired a group of young executives to find "the perfect hamburger". After a three-month courtship, he hired Ollie Gleichenhaus, owner of Ollie's Sandwich Shop, a small diner in Miami Beach, Florida, to train Lum's staff to prepare his "Ollie Burger" hamburgers. He later started a chain of take-out restaurants called Ollie's Trolley, named for Gleichenhaus. Initially successful, Brown said, "That venture [Ollie's Trolley] collapsed". Lions Clubs International in Tampa, Florida, honored Brown with its Service to America Award in 1974. Brown sold the Lum's chain for $9.5 million to Friedrich Jahn's Wienerwald holding group in 1978. A few years later, Brown launched John Y's Chicken, a venture which also subsequently failed. Kenny Rogers Roasters, another chain founded with country music superstar Kenny Rogers, proved more successful.

== Basketball ventures ==
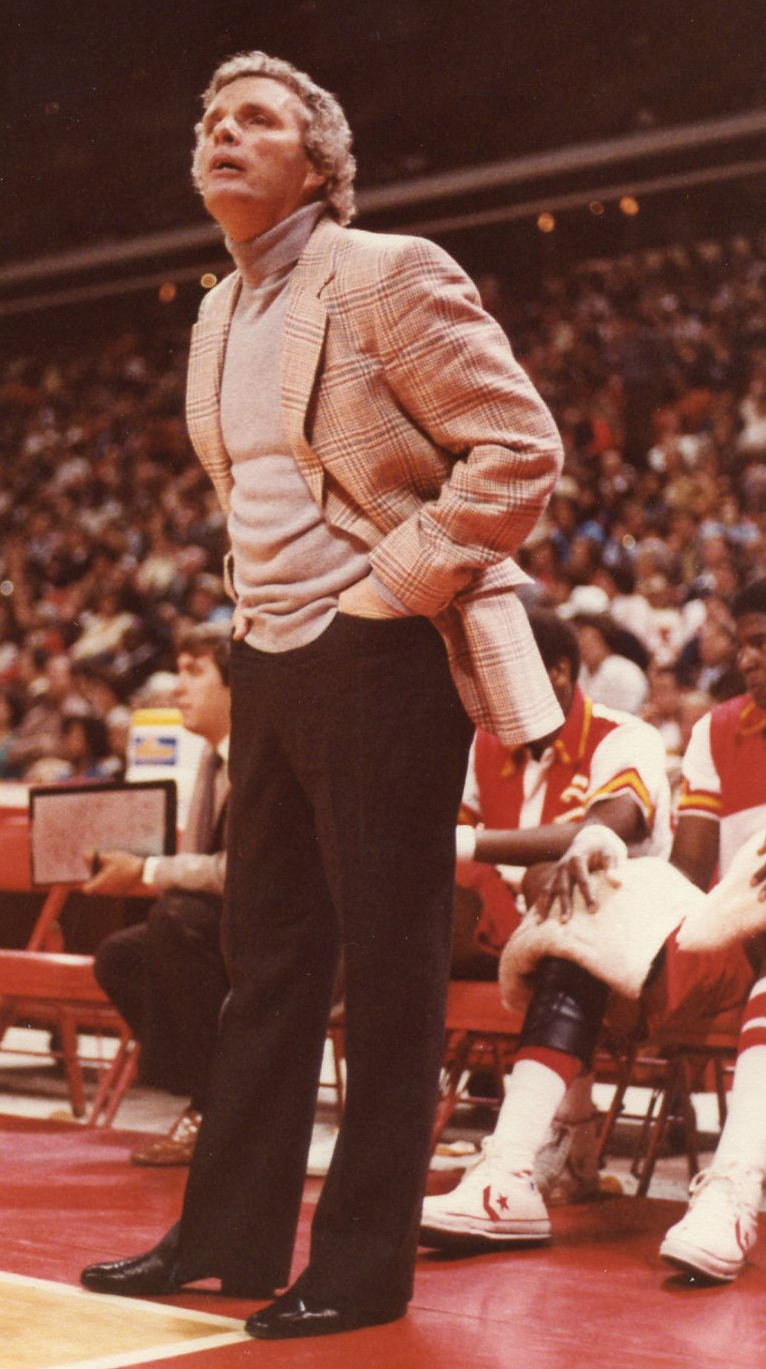
Hubie Brown coached the Kentucky Colonels to the ABA championship in 1975.

Concurrent with his post-KFC business ventures, Brown purchased an ownership stake in several professional basketball teams. He owned three professional basketball teams, one of those being the Boston Celtics. In 1970, Wendell Cherry assembled a group that included Brown to buy the American Basketball Association's (ABA) Kentucky Colonels. Following the 1972–73 season, Cherry sold his interest in the Colonels to a group from Cincinnati; Brown immediately purchased Cherry's interest from the group, reportedly to keep the team from moving to Cincinnati. He put his wife and a 10-woman board of directors in charge of the team. Colonels general manager Mike Storen felt that this was a sign that Brown was going to run the team "his way" and left the team as a result; two months later, he accepted the job of ABA league commissioner. Head coach Joe Mullaney followed soon after, saying that Brown was going to be too meddlesome in personnel decisions. Babe McCarthy lasted only one season as Mullaney's replacement; in 1975, Brown hired Hubie Brown (no relation) as head coach. The team won the ABA championship the following year.

Although he had been hailed as a hero, first for saving the Colonels from moving to Cincinnati and then for bringing a championship to Louisville, Brown came under intense public criticism following the Colonels' championship season for selling the rights to center Dan Issel to the Baltimore Claws in a cost-saving move. He frequently clashed with coach Hubie Brown during the 1975–76 season, and at the end of the year, he accepted $3 million to fold the team during the 1976 ABA–NBA merger rather than paying $3 million for the team to join the National Basketball Association (NBA).

After folding the Colonels, Brown stated that basketball was not the kind of business he wanted to be involved in. Despite this declaration, he purchased half-ownership in the NBA's Buffalo Braves later in 1976. The Braves had posted a dismal 30–52 record in the 1975–76 season, and Brown immediately set out to make moves that would improve the franchise's fortunes in the next season. He re-signed All Star guard Randy Smith, who had threatened to leave as a free agent, then traded the club's first-round draft pick to the Milwaukee Bucks for center Swen Nater. In a single day, he made two significant trades. In the first, he swapped reigning Rookie of the Year Adrian Dantley for the Indiana Pacers' Billy Knight, who was second in the league in scoring the previous season. Four hours later, he acquired Nate "Tiny" Archibald from the New York Nets for George Johnson and a first-round draft pick in 1979. In 1977, Brown purchased the remaining share of the team from the owner Paul Snyder.

The following year, Brown traded franchises with Boston Celtics owner Irv Levin. The move allowed Levin to move his franchise to his home state of California, while giving Brown ownership of the league's most storied franchise. Two weeks before the swap of franchises was made official, details of a six-player trade between the two were reported. Boston sent Freeman Williams, Kevin Kunnert, and Kermit Washington to the Braves for "Tiny" Archibald, Billy Knight, and Marvin Barnes. The move turned Boston fans against Brown, both because Kunnert and Washington were seen as key pieces of the team's future and because team president and legendary former coach Red Auerbach publicly stated that he was not consulted about the trade. The relationship between Brown and Auerbach worsened with Brown's decision to trade three first-round draft picks that Auerbach had planned to use to rebuild the franchise for Bob McAdoo. Again, Brown made the trade without consulting Auerbach. Auerbach almost left Boston to take a job with the New York Knicks as a result. Brown eventually sold his interest in the team to co-owner Harry Mangurian in 1979.

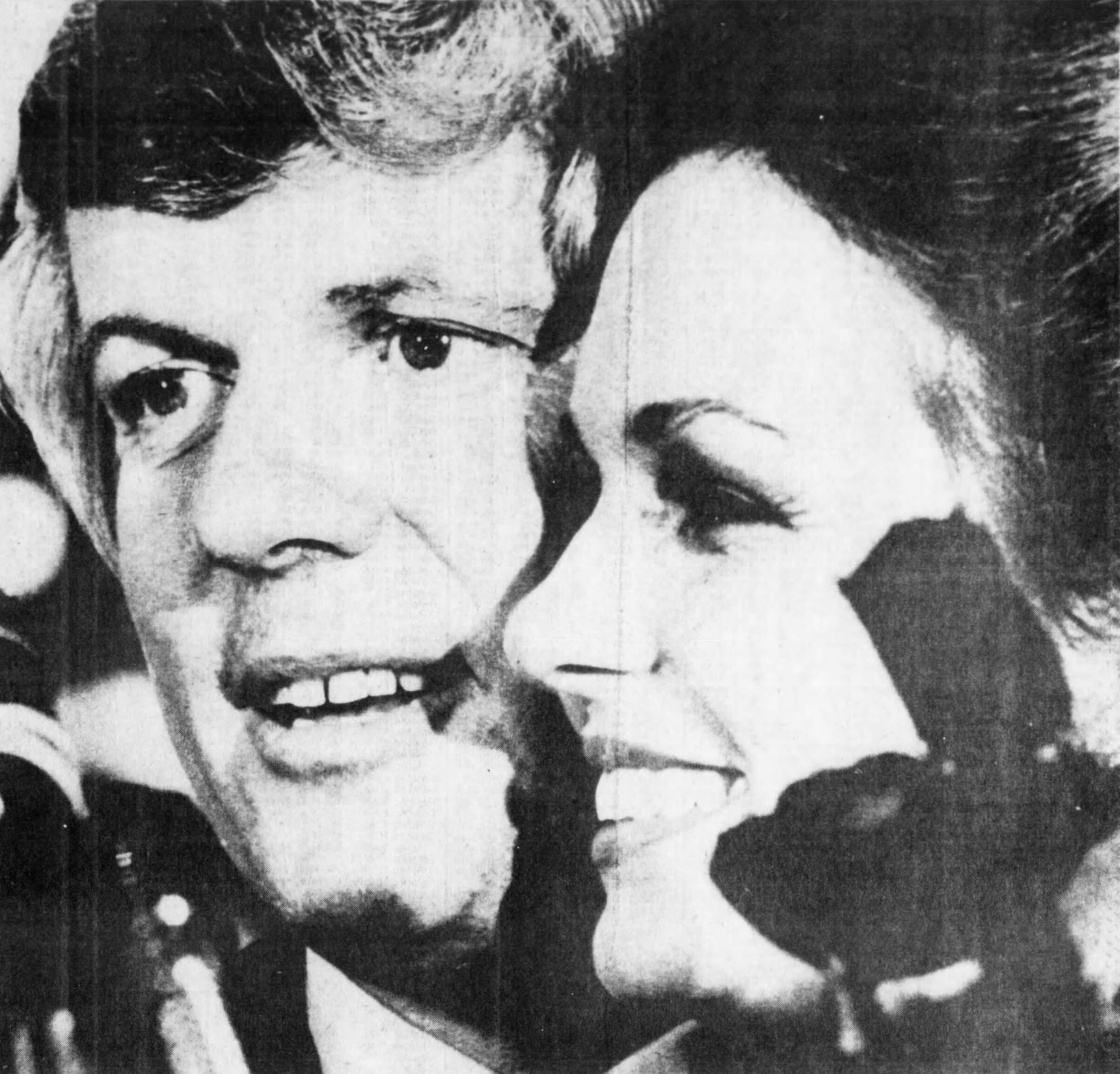
John and Phyllis Brown circa 1981

Brown and his first wife divorced in 1977. On March 17, 1979, he married former Miss America and CBS sportscaster Phyllis George. The ceremony was performed by Norman Vincent Peale. Brown and George had two children, Lincoln Tyler George Brown and Pamela Ashley Brown. Pamela would later become a major journalist for CNN after joining the network in 2021.

== Political career ==
Unlike his father, Brown showed only a passing interest in politics prior to 1979. In the 1960 election, he was named vice-chairman of John F. Kennedy's presidential campaign in Kentucky. He was a member of the Young Leadership Council of the Democratic National Committee, and was named honorary chairman of the National Democratic Party in 1972. Later that year, he considered running for the U.S. Senate, but decided against it once former governor Louie Nunn entered the race. From 1972 to 1974, he hosted the Democratic National Telethon. He founded the Governor's Economic Development Commission of Kentucky and was chair from 1975 to 1977.

=== Gubernatorial election of 1979 ===
On March 27, 1979, Brown interrupted his honeymoon with Phyllis George to announce his candidacy for governor of Kentucky. The announcement surprised most political observers because of his prior political apathy and because Brown had spent considerable time out of the state with his business ventures and lavish lifestyle. Funding his campaign with his own personal fortune, Brown launched a massive media campaign promoting his candidacy to help him overcome his late start in the race. He promised to run the state government like a business and to be a salesman for the state as governor.

Other candidates in the Democratic field included sitting lieutenant governor Thelma Stovall, former state representative Terry McBrayer (the choice of sitting governor Julian Carroll), United States congressman Carroll Hubbard, state auditor George Adkins, and Louisville mayor Harvey I. Sloane. Initially the leading candidate, Stovall was hampered during the campaign by ill health. During the campaign, Brown was attacked by McBrayer for refusing to release his federal tax returns. McBrayer also claimed that Brown had not voted in a Democratic primary since 1975, a charge validated by public voting records. Nevertheless, Brown won the primary by a margin of 25,000 votes. The race was so close that Sloane, Brown's closest competitor, refused to concede for two days. Brown defeated former Republican governor Louie Nunn in the 1979 general election by a vote of 588,088 to 381,278.

=== Renovation of Governor's Mansion ===
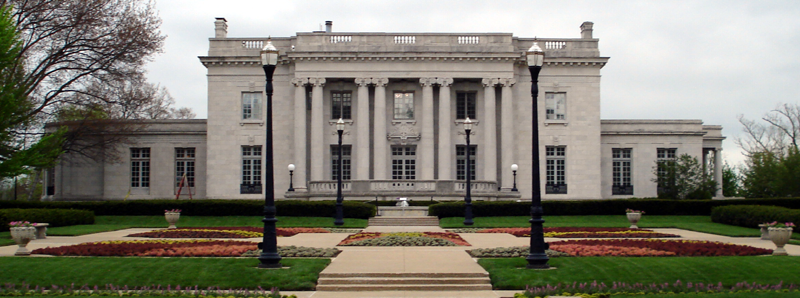
The Kentucky Governor's Mansion underwent a significant renovation during Brown's term

Within a month of moving into the Governor's Mansion, Brown noticed significant deterioration in the wiring and ordered a full inspection. The Department of Buildings and Construction's preliminary report stated, "If this was a privately operated structure, this office would have no alternative other than to give the operator 30 to 60 days to rewire the structure." The report went on to say that the mansion was a virtual firetrap. Upon receiving the report, Brown immediately moved his family out of the mansion and back to Cave Hill, his estate in Lexington. The Department of Buildings and Construction forbade use of the mansion for overnight purposes or group meetings until repairs could be made. Brown's Cave Hill estate was officially designated the temporary executive mansion, and the state agreed to furnish Brown's groceries, reimburse him for entertaining official guests, and pay for telephone calls made in his capacity as governor. He was also given a travel allowance.

In March 1980, the General Assembly created a committee to study whether it would be more feasible to construct a new governor's mansion or repair the old one. Ultimately, they decided to renovate the existing mansion, and Brown's wife Phyllis was given liberal input into the decision making. The state had expected to cover the cost of the repairs using federal revenue sharing funds, but President Jimmy Carter ordered a halt to the funds in May 1980. First lady Phyllis Brown organized a group called "Save the Mansion" to raise private funds to offset the repair costs. Independently wealthy, Governor Brown donated his first year's salary to the project. He waived his salary for the remainder of his term. The renovation and repairs were completed in March 1983, and the Brown family returned to the mansion in April.

=== Governorship ===
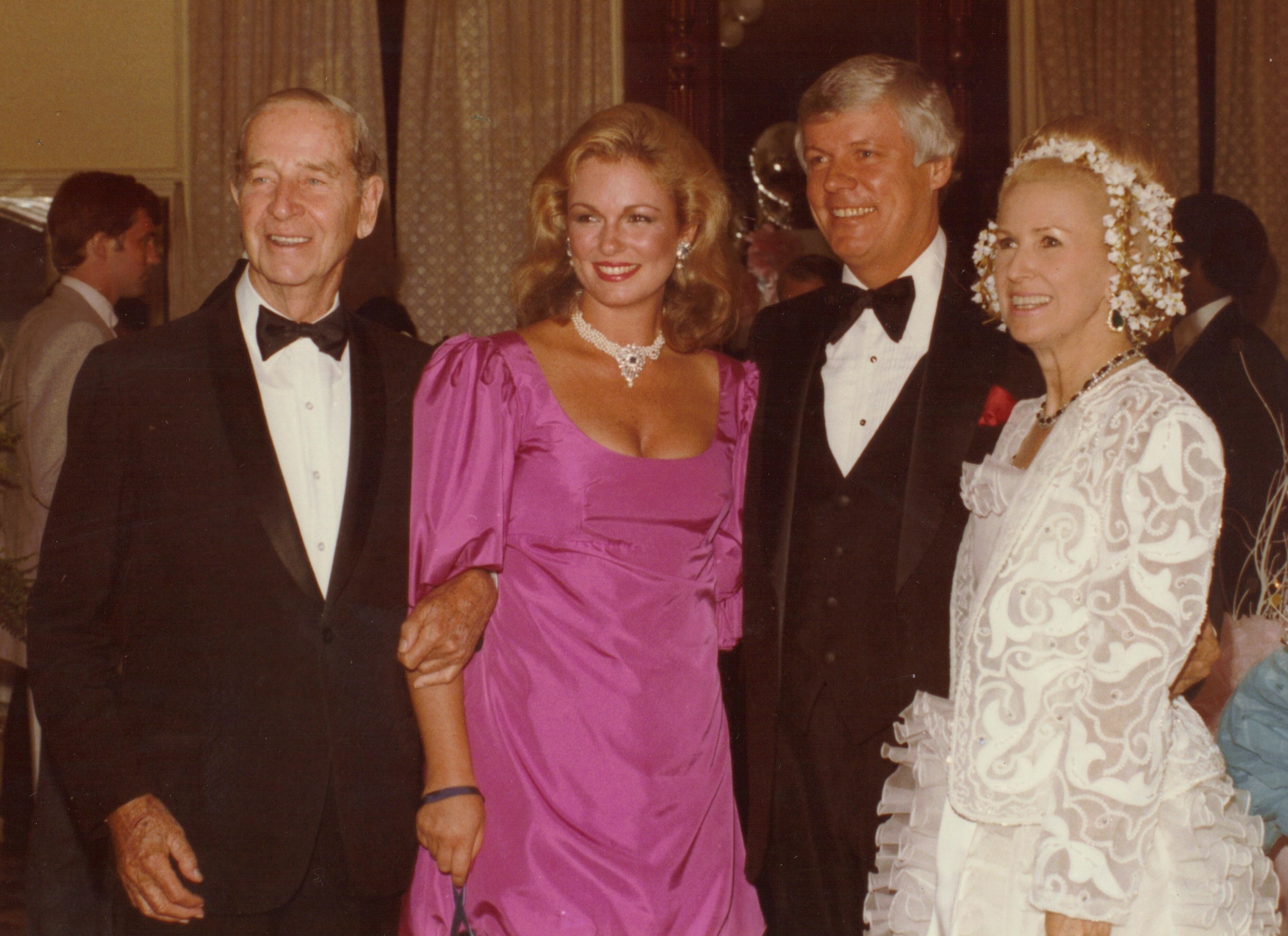
Governor and Mrs. John Y. Brown, with C.V. Whitney and Marylou Whitney.

Because Brown owed few favors to the state's established politicians, many of his top appointees were businesspeople. Keeping a campaign promise to appoint a woman and an African American to his cabinet, Brown named William E. McAnulty Jr., and Jacqueline Swigart to his cabinet. McAnulty resigned his post as secretary of the state's Justice Cabinet within one month, saying the position would keep him from spending enough time with his family. Brown then re-appointed McAnulty to his former position as a judge with the Jefferson County District Court. He also appointed Viola Davis Brown as Executive Director of the Office of Public Health Nursing in 1980. She was the first African American nurse to lead a state office of public health nursing in the United States. His most controversial appointment was Frank Metts, his secretary of transportation. Metts broke with political tradition in Kentucky, announcing that contracts would be awarded on the basis of competitive bids and performance rather than political patronage. Despite cutting personnel from the department, Metts doubled the miles of road that were resurfaced.

Difficult economic times marked Brown's term in office. During his tenure, the state's unemployment rate climbed from 5.6 percent to 11.7 percent. Brown stuck to his campaign promise not to raise taxes. When state income fell short of expectations, he reduced the state budget by 22 percent and cut the number of state employees from 37,241 to 30,783, mostly through transfer and attrition. At the same time, his merit pay policies increased salaries for the remaining employees by an average of 34 percent. He cut the executive office staff from ninety-seven to thirty and sold seven of the state's eight government airplanes.

Brown appointed a group of insurance experts to study the state's policies and put them out for bid, ultimately saving $2 million. He also required competitive bids from banks where state funds were deposited; the extra interest generated by this process generated an additional $50 million in revenue to the general fund. He opened communications and contacts with Japan, setting the stage for future economic relations between that country and Kentucky. Among his other accomplishments as governor were the implementation of competitive bidding for government contracts and passage of a weight-distance tax on trucks.

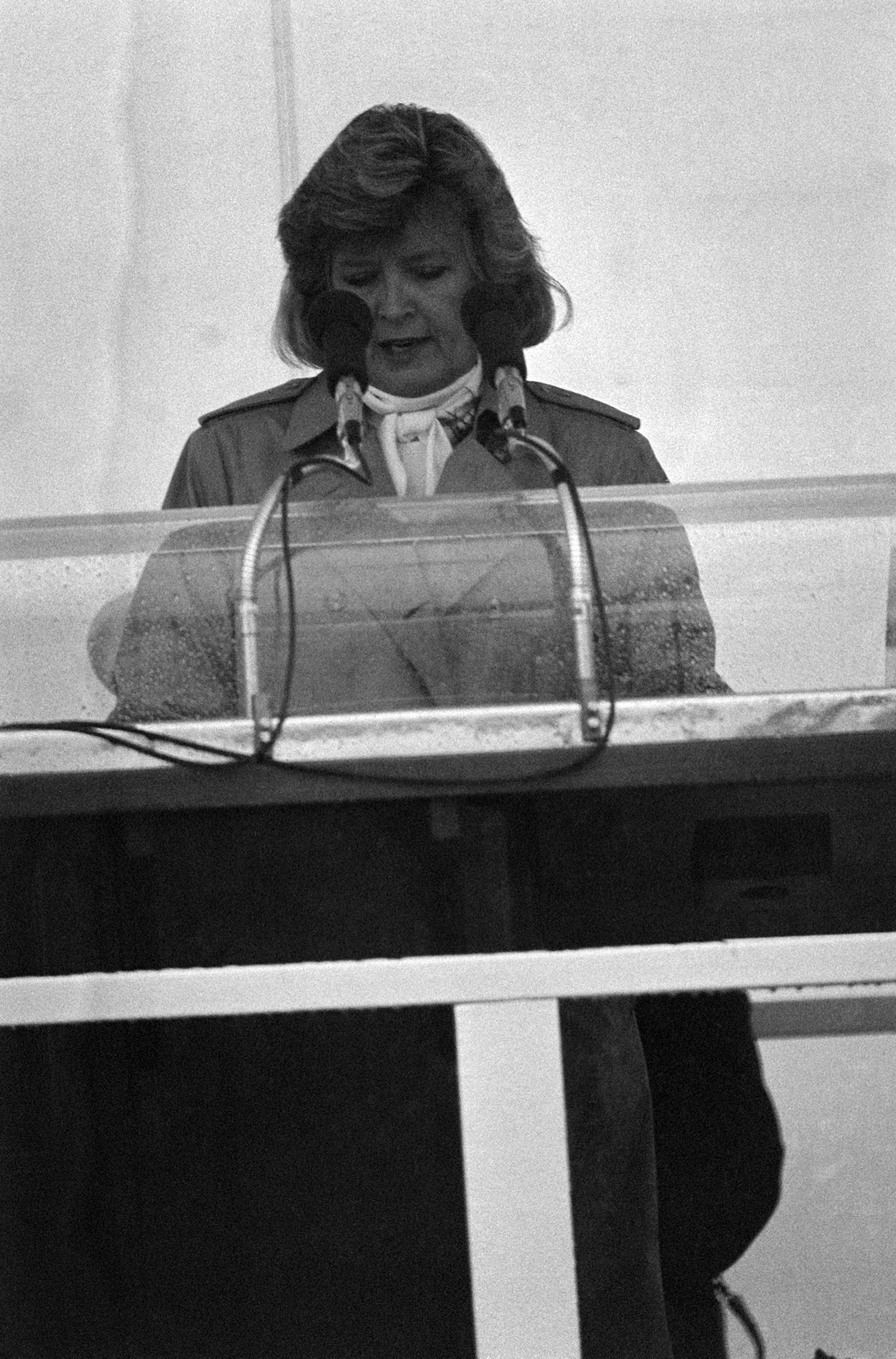
Lt. Gov. Martha Layne Collins acted as governor for more than 500 days of Brown's term.

Brown was less involved with the legislative process than previous governors. For example, he did not attempt to influence the choice of legislative leadership, while most previous governors had practically hand-selected the presiding officers in each house. During one of the two legislative sessions of his term, he went on vacation. Consequently, many of his legislative recommendations were not enacted. Among his failed proposals were a multi-county banking law, a flat rate income tax, professional negotiations for teachers, and a constitutional amendment to allow a governor to be elected to successive terms. In all, Brown was out of the state – leaving Lieutenant Governor Martha Layne Collins as acting governor – for more than five hundred days during his four-year term. As noted by Kentucky historian Lowell H. Harrison, Brown's hands-off approach allowed the legislature to gain power relative to the governor for the first time in Kentucky history, a trend which continued into the terms of his successors.

During his term, Brown was co-chairman of the Appalachian Regional Commission and chair of the Southern States' Energy Board. In May 1981, he was awarded an honorary Doctor of Laws degree from the University of Kentucky, and in May 1982, he was the recipient of the Father of the Year award. In September 1983, the national Democratic Party named him Democrat of the Year, and he was later made the party's lifetime Honorary Treasurer.

In 1982, Brown was briefly hospitalized for hypertension, and near the end of his term, he underwent quadruple bypass surgery. While recovering from the surgery, Brown suffered a rare pulmonary disease, keeping him hospitalized for weeks, during part of which time he was comatose. He had no pulse for a period of time, and one of his lungs partially collapsed. Brown's office tried to conceal the seriousness of his condition, drawing fire from the press. Following his recovery, he gave up smoking and took up jogging.

In Kentucky's Governors, Brown biographer Mary K. Bonsteel Tachau said of his administration: "There were no scandals. Neither he nor any of his people were accused of corruption." Scandal did touch Brown personally, however, as well as some of his close associates. In 1981, he was investigated for withdrawing $1.3 million in personal cash from the All American Bank of Miami. The bank failed to report the transaction to the Internal Revenue Service as required by law. When the Federal Bureau of Investigation probed the matter in 1983, Brown claimed he withdrew the money to cover gambling debts he ran up during "one bad night gambling" in Las Vegas. Brown, who was not the focus of the FBI's investigation, later recanted that statement.

Some of Brown's associates were involved with a Lexington cocaine and gun-smuggling ring called "The Company". James P. Lambert, an associate of Brown's since they attended the University of Kentucky together, was indicted on more than 60 drug charges. Phone records also showed calls from the governor's mansion to several individuals eventually convicted of drug charges in connection with the investigation.

=== Later political career ===
On March 15, 1984, Brown filed to run as a candidate for the U.S. Senate seat held by Walter Dee Huddleston just hours before the filing deadline. Six weeks later, on April 27, he withdrew his candidacy, citing the effects of his serious illness and surgery from the previous year.

In 1987, Brown again ran for governor, entering a crowded Democratic primary that included Lieutenant Governor Steve Beshear, former governor Julian Carroll, Grady Stumbo, and political newcomer Wallace Wilkinson. He entered the race late – filing his candidacy papers in late February before the primary election in late May. When Brown approached the state capitol to file his papers, Beshear met him outside the filing office and challenged him to an impromptu debate, but Brown declined. As Brown quickly became the frontrunner, Beshear attacked his lavish lifestyle in a series of campaign ads, one of which was based on the popular television show Lifestyles of the Rich and Famous. Other ads by Beshear played up Brown's ties to James P. Lambert, while still others claimed that Brown would raise taxes. Brown refuted Beshear's claims in ads of his own, and the battle between Beshear and Brown opened an opportunity for Wilkinson – who distinguished himself from the field by advocating for a state lottery – to make a late surge. He defeated Brown, his closest competitor, by a margin of 58,000 votes.

== Later life ==
Following his unsuccessful run for the governorship in 1987, Brown resumed his career in the restaurant industry. He started the Chicken Grill restaurant in Louisville and helped his wife, Phyllis, launch Chicken By George, a line of boneless, skinless chicken breast products designed for sale in supermarkets and preparation at home. In 1988, Hormel made Chicken By George one of its subsidiaries. Brown expanded several other restaurants including Miami Subs, Texas Roadhouse, and Roadhouse Grill. None of these ventures matched the success he experienced early in his career.

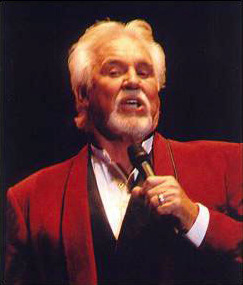
Singer Kenny Rogers collaborated with Brown to launch Kenny Rogers Roasters in 1991.

In 1991, Brown formed a partnership with recording artist Kenny Rogers, and was co-founder and CEO of Kenny Rogers Roasters, an international chain of wood-roasted chicken restaurants. The founding of Kenny Rogers Roasters was part of a larger movement in the restaurant industry toward healthier, take-home offerings. Roasters immediately found itself in competition with Boston Chicken (later known as Boston Market) and several smaller roasted chicken chains. Kentucky Fried Chicken also introduced a roasted chicken line of products called Rotisserie Gold to compete with Roasters and Boston Chicken. In December 1992, Clucker's, a smaller player in the roasted chicken market, sued Kenny Rogers Roasters, claiming the chain had copied its recipes and menus. The lawsuit continued until Roasters purchased a majority stake in Cluckers in August 1994. Brown then took Roasters public and grew it to a chain of more than 1,000 restaurants before selling his interest in the franchise to the Malaysia-based Berjaya Group in 1996.

Brown and his wife Phyllis separated in August 1995. Phyllis filed for divorce in Kentucky in 1996, but withdrew the petition amid settlement talks with her husband. After Brown reportedly cut off much of his wife's financial support, she filed a second divorce petition in 1997, this time in Broward County, Florida where her husband was living at the time. After a brief legal fight over whether the proceedings should take place in Kentucky or Florida, the divorce became final in 1998. Later that year, he married former Mrs. Kentucky Jill Louise Roach, 27 years his junior, but they divorced in 2003 for reasons not released. When asked why they divorced he stated "I do have great love for Jill, but something which cannot be overlooked has come up in our marriage. I will always love her and her children, but it seems a divorce is our only option now."

In 1997, Brown agreed to be co-chairman of Governor Paul E. Patton's Council on Domestic Violence along with Patton's wife, Judi. Brown said he had always been interested in curbing domestic violence, but his interest became personal after he discovered that his sister, Betty "Boo" McCann, had been a victim. In 2003, Patton renamed Kentucky Route 9 as the "John Y. Brown Jr. AA Highway". The "AA" designation comes from the fact that the highway originally connected the cities of Alexandria and Ashland.

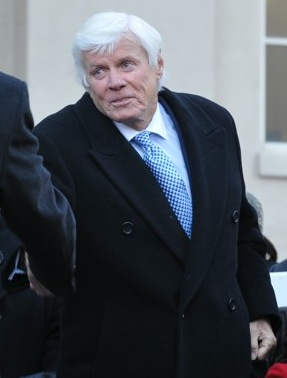
Brown Jr. in 2011

In late 2006, Brown partnered with actress Suzanne Somers to open a do-it-yourself meal preparation store called Suzanne's Kitchen. The flagship store opened in Tates Creek Centre in Lexington, and a second store was opened in New Jersey. Brown intended to build the business into a chain, but five months after the Lexington location opened, both stores closed. Brown said he wanted to "revamp the whole format to get something even more convenient" and promised to re-open both stores at some unspecified future date. Investor John Shannon Bouchillon sued Brown and Somers, claiming they had deceived him both before and after his investment of $400,000. The case against Brown was dropped before it went to trial. In 2011, a Fayette County, Kentucky judge dismissed the suit against Somers for lack of evidence.

Brown refused to serve on the inaugural committee of his old political foe, Steve Beshear, when Beshear was elected governor in 2007. All of Kentucky's living former Democratic governors were invited to participate, and each accepted the invitation with the exception of Brown. Of his refusal, Brown stated "I don't respect him. I don't want to be part of it. I'm not really interested in being politically correct." Referring to the 1987 Democratic gubernatorial primary campaign, Brown continued, "He said things that were not true, like we had raised taxes. I just never respected him after that." However, when Beshear was reelected in 2011, Brown did serve as inauguration co-chair with the other former governors.

In 2008, Brown was named to the University of Kentucky College of Law Alumni Association's Hall of Fame. In a press release, the association cited Brown's success at Kentucky Fried Chicken, his political career, and his help in establishing the university's Sanders–Brown Center on Aging as reasons for his induction. The center is named in honor of Harland Sanders and Brown's father. Brown divided his time between homes in Lexington, Kentucky, and Fort Lauderdale, Florida.

== Death ==
Brown died at a hospital in Lexington on November 22, 2022, aged 88. His casket lay in state in the rotunda of the Kentucky State Capitol for two days starting on November 29, 2022. His funeral was held at the Kentucky State Capitol on November 30. Brown was buried in Lexington Cemetery.

Party political offices
Preceded by Julian Carroll	Democratic nominee for Governor of Kentucky; 1979	Succeeded by Martha Layne Collins
Preceded by Jerry Brown	Chair of the Democratic Governors Association; 1982–1983	Succeeded by Scott M. Matheson
Political offices
Preceded by Julian Carroll	Governor of Kentucky; 1979–1983	Succeeded by Martha Layne Collins
