= Edward Rumsey =

American politician

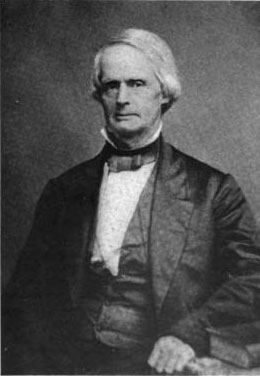
- Edward Rumsey, circa 1845

Member of the U.S. House of Representatives from Kentucky's 2nd district
- In office March 4, 1837 – March 3, 1839
- Preceded by: Albert G. Hawes
- Succeeded by: Philip Triplett

Member of the Kentucky House of Representatives
- In office 1822

Personal details
- Born: November 5, 1796 Botetourt County, Virginia, US
- Died: April 6, 1868 (aged 71) Greenville, Kentucky, US
- Resting place: Old Caney Station Cemetery
- Party: Whig Party (United States)
- Spouse: Jane Merrihew Wing
- Relations: Nephew of James Rumsey
- Profession: Lawyer

Edward Rumsey (November 5, 1796 – April 6, 1868) was a United States representative from Kentucky.

== Background ==
Rumsey was born to Dr. Edward Rumsey in Botetourt County, Virginia. When the younger Rumsey was still a child, Dr. Rumsey moved the family to Christian County, Kentucky. Studying under Daniel Barry, he completed preparatory studies in Hopkinsville, Kentucky. He studied law under John J. Crittenden, with whom he became lifelong friends. He moved to Greenville, Kentucky where he was admitted to the bar and practiced in Muhlenberg and surrounding counties.

== Biography ==
Rumsey was elected to the Kentucky House of Representatives in 1822. The major questions during his tenure were those connected to the Old Court-New Court controversy.

On January 5, 1832, Rumsey married Jane Merrihew Wing. The couple had two children.

Rumsey was elected as a Whig to the Twenty-fifth Congress, serving from March 4, 1837, to March 3, 1839. On February 9, 1839, he gave an impassioned speech on the House floor regarding a resolution to recognize his uncle, James Rumsey, as the inventor of the steamboat and to present a gold medal to his cousin, his uncle's only child. The resolution unanimously passed the House, but failed in the Senate.

In spring 1838, both Rumsey's young children contracted scarlet fever and died. Overwhelmed with sorrow, he retired from public life at the end of his congressional term. After leaving Congress, he again resumed the practice of his profession. He died in Greenville, Kentucky in 1868 and was buried in the Old Caney Station Cemetery, near Greenville, Kentucky.

== Honors ==
According to historian Otto Rothert, the town of Rumsey in McLean County, Kentucky was to be named after Edward Rumsey. Out of modesty, Rumsey declined, after which the citizens agreed to a compromise whereby the town would be called Rumsey and officially be named in honor of James Rumsey.

U.S. House of Representatives
Preceded by Albert G. Hawes	Member of the U.S. House of Representatives from Kentucky's 2nd congressional district March 4, 1837 – March 3, 1839	Succeeded by Philip Triplett
