= Katherine Peden =

Kentucky business leader, politician, and government advisor

Katie Peden
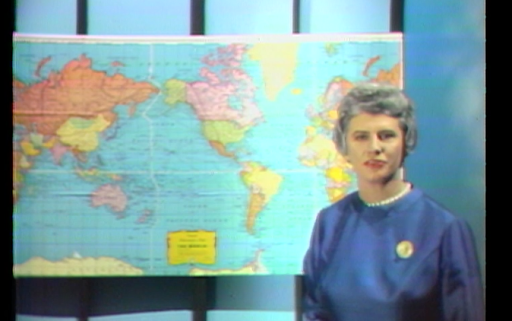

Personal details
- Born: Katherine Graham; January 2, 1926 Hopkinsville, Kentucky, U.S.
- Died: January 8, 2006 (aged 80) Lexington, Kentucky, U.S.
- Party: Democratic

Katherine Graham Peden (January 2, 1926 – January 8, 2006) was the first woman appointed as the commissioner of commerce in Kentucky. Peden was engaged in economic growth policy-making at the national and state levels during the 1960s and 70s. She was appointed to advisory positions by United States Presidents John F. Kennedy, Lyndon Johnson. and Jimmy Carter during a time that few women were selected to serve in these positions. She was the first woman in Kentucky to win a statewide Senate primary.

In 1969 she was appointed to the board of directors of MeadWestvaco, then called Westvaco, becoming one of the first women in the nation named to a Fortune 500 company board of directors. The company credited Peden for their decision to build a major plant near Wickliffe, Kentucky, on the Mississippi River in far western Kentucky.

== Early life and education ==
Katherine Graham Peden was born in Hopkinsville, Kentucky in 1926. Her father, William Edward Peden (1887–1973), was a construction supervisor; and, her mother, Mary Gorin Peden (1890–1972), was a school teacher. She graduated from Hopkinsville High School. She was a member of the First Christian Church of Hopkinsville.

Her professional career started in 1944 when she went to work at radio station WHOP (AM). She became general manager of the station and owner of WNVL in Nicholasville, Kentucky. She also worked as the national sales manager for five CBS television stations.

== National and State Leadership ==
=== Federation of Business and Professional Women's Club ===
Peden, first a member of the Hopkinsville local chapter, was elected the national president of National Federation of Business and Professional Women's Club (BPW) in 1961.

=== First woman commerce commissioner 1963 ===
Having served successfully as his campaign manager, Peden was appointed by Kentucky Governor Edward T. Breathitt as Commerce Commissioner in 1963. Her departmental reforms and targeted campaign to recruit businesses to Kentucky led to the journal BusinessWeek coining her work as "Pedenblitz." By the end of her four years in that position, "150,000 new jobs had been created, unemployment in Kentucky was cut in half and personal income had increased by 30 percent."

=== President Kennedy appointment to Commission on Status of Women ===
In 1963, President John F. Kennedy appointed Peden to the President's Commission on the Status of Women established in 1961.

=== President Johnson appointment to Kerner Commission 1967 ===
Peden was the only woman on the Kerner Commission that investigated the race riots in the United States in the mid-1960s.

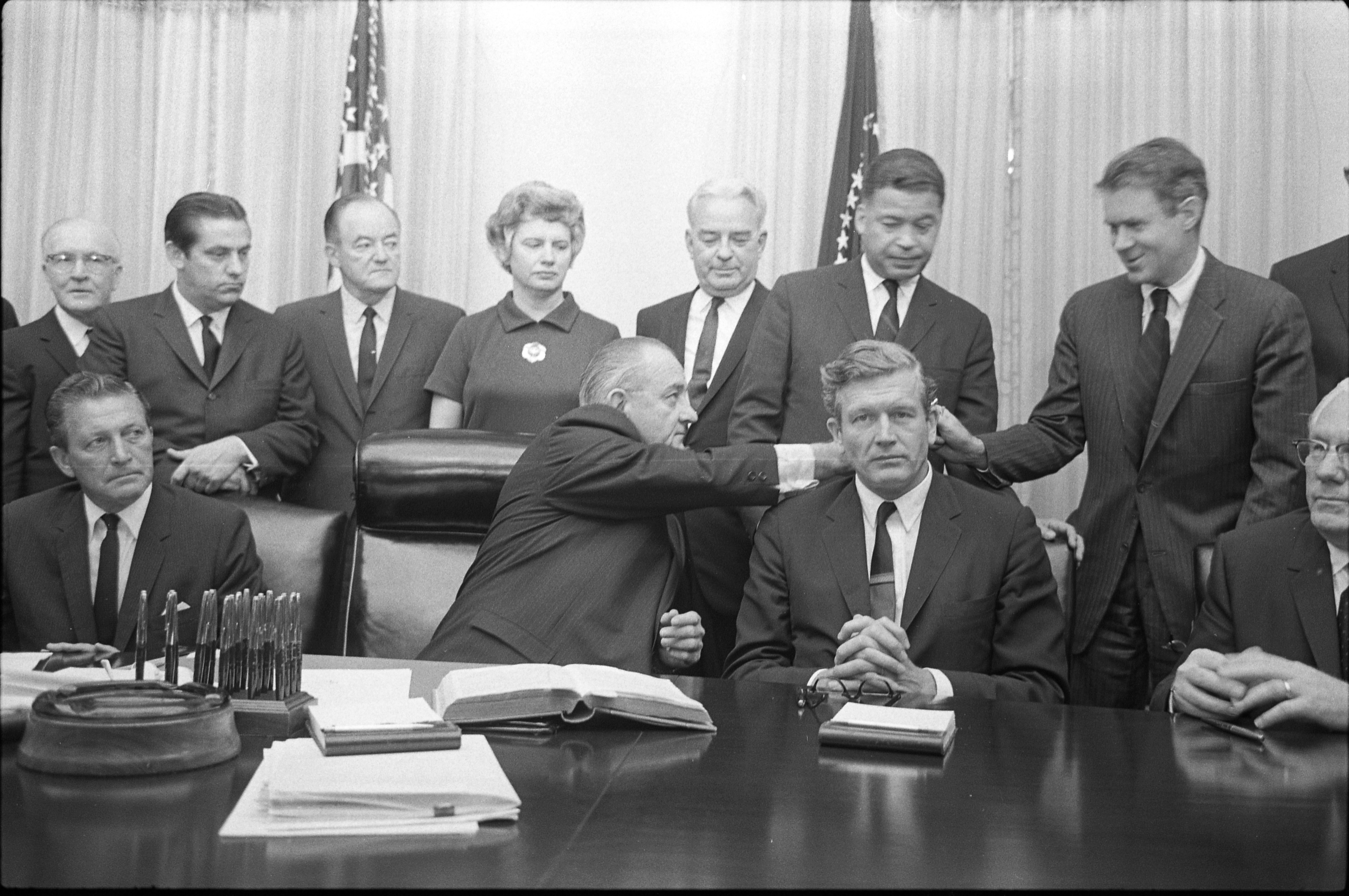
President Lyndon Baines Johnson with some members of the National Advisory Commission on Civil Disorders (Kerner Commission) in the Cabinet Room of the White House, Washington, D.C.

=== U.S. Senate campaign 1968 ===
In May 1968, Peden won the Democratic primary for U.S. Senate with 42.5% of the vote over John Y. Brown Sr. of Lexington (25.4%) and 10 other candidates. That summer she gave a speech at the 1968 Democratic National Convention in Chicago. Peden lost the general election to Republican Marlow Cook of Louisville by a 51.4 to 47.6 percent margin.

In 1968 Peden started her own company, Peden and Associates, which specialized in industrial and community development and brokerage.

=== President Carter appointment 1978 ===
President Jimmy Carter appointed her in 1978 to the Executive Committee of the White House Conference on Balanced Growth and Economic Development.

== Death and legacy ==
Peden died in Lexington, Kentucky on January 8, 2006, after a long illness. She is buried at Riverside Cemetery near her parents' graves in Hopkinsville, Kentucky.

The Phelps Dodge Company was recruited by Peden to Hopkinsville and upon the development of the first Pembroke Road Industrial Park, a street is named in her honor.

In 1996, the Industrial Development Research Council, an association of corporate and real estate executives and development professionals now known as the International Development Research Council, designated her "Master Professional"—the first woman with this title.

In 2003, the Kentucky Commission on Women named her as a Kentucky Women Remembered honoree.

Party political offices
Preceded by Wilson W. Wyatt	Democratic nominee for U.S. Senator from Kentucky (Class 3); 1968	Succeeded by Wendell H. Ford
