= Philip Triplett =

American politician

Member of the U.S. House of Representatives from Kentucky's 2nd district
- In office March 4, 1839 – March 3, 1843
- Preceded by: Edward Rumsey
- Succeeded by: Willis Green

Member of the Kentucky House of Representatives
- In office 1824–1824

Personal details
- Born: December 24, 1799 Madison County, Kentucky, U.S.
- Died: March 30, 1852 (aged 52) Owensboro, Kentucky, U.S.
- Resting place: Rosehill Elmwood Cemetery
- Party: Whig

Philip Triplett (December 24, 1799 – March 30, 1852) was a U.S. representative from Kentucky.

Born in Madison County, Kentucky, Triplett attended the common schools of central Kentucky near Franklin, and in Scott County. He studied law in Owensboro, Kentucky. He was admitted to the bar and commenced practice in Owensboro in 1824. He served as member of the State house of representatives in 1824.

Triplett was elected as a Whig to the Twenty-sixth and Twenty-seventh Congresses (March 3, 1839 – March 3, 1843). He was not a candidate for reelection in 1842. He served as delegate to the State constitutional convention in 1849. He died in Owensboro, Kentucky, March 30, 1852. He was interred in Rosehill Elmwood Cemetery.

U.S. House of Representatives
Preceded by Edward Rumsey	Member of the U.S. House of Representatives from Kentucky's 2nd congressional district March 4, 1839 – March 3, 1843	Succeeded by Willis Green
