= James Rumsey Monument =

American historic site, monument, and municipal park

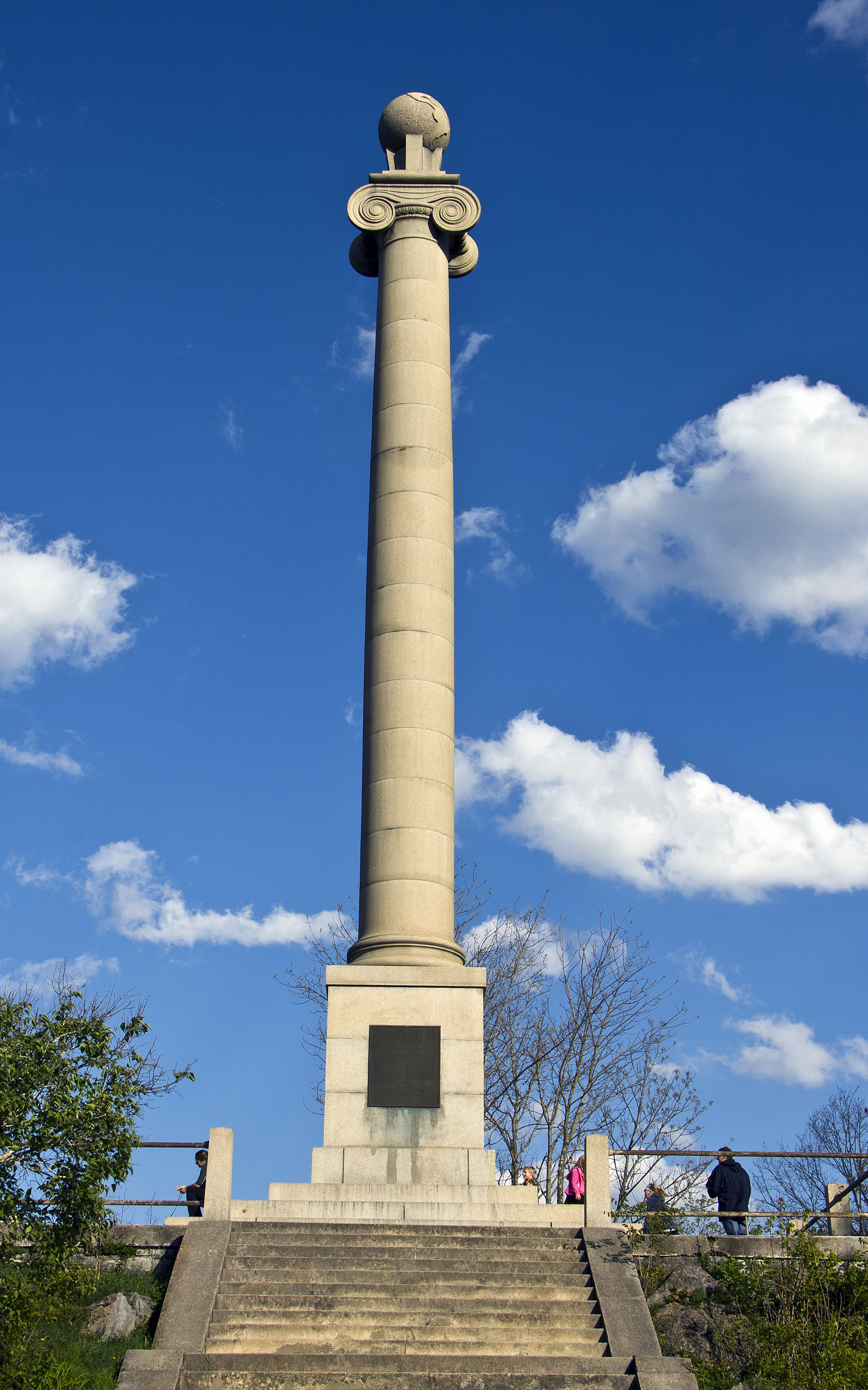
- James Rumsey Monument

- Location within West Virginia
- Location: Shepherdstown, Jefferson County, West Virginia, U.S.
- Coordinates: 39°25′58″N 77°47′57″W
- Area: 4.09 acres (1.66 ha)
- Elevation: 394 ft (120 m)
- Designation: Municipal Park; Former West Virginia State Park
- Established: 1916 (erected); 1956 (state park); 1978 (municipal park)
- Named for: James Rumsey
- Owner: Rumseian Society (1907–2007); Corporation of Shepherdstown (2007–present) (Note: The Rumseian Society owned the monument from 1907 until 2007, when it was transferred to the corporation of Shepherdstown. The West Virginia Conservation Commission Division of State Parks and the succeeding Department of Natural Resources, operated the site as a state park from 1956 until 1978. The Department of Natural Resources purchased 3.45 acres (1.40 ha) adjoining the monument site in 1971, and transferred this land to the corporation of Shepherdstown in 1978.)

The James Rumsey Monument, also known as Rumsey Monument Park, is a municipal park and former West Virginia state park in Shepherdstown in the U.S. state of West Virginia. The park overlooks the Potomac River. It commemorates local inventor James Rumsey and his successful public demonstration of his steamboat invention on the Potomac in 1787. The monument consists of a 75 ft (23 m) column of Woodstock granite, which is capped with a globe and stands atop a tall, concrete plinth consisting of a 40 sq ft (3.7 m^{2}) plaza.

Interest in building a monument to Rumsey at Shepherdstown, and to the first successful public demonstration of his steamboat, began in the 19th century. In 1888, Congressman Alexander Boteler sought to raise money for a monument to Rumsey. In 1903, state senator William Campbell introduced bills to fund a monument and in 1905, the West Virginia Legislature provisioned an initial $1,750 for the monument (equivalent to $62,708 in 2025). The Rumseian Society (Note: The society's name was rendered as both "Rumseian" and "Rumseyan" throughout various periods of its existence. For consistency and to avoid confusion, the society is referred to as the Rumseian Society in this article.) was incorporated in 1906 to facilitate the monument's construction. The Society acquired land from Norfolk and Western Railway in 1907, and commenced construction in 1915 following a contract with Forbes Granite Company of Chambersburg, Pennsylvania.

The monument was completed in 1916 and became a state park in 1956, when the legislature transferred its operation to the state Conservation Commission's Division of State Parks. The commission was succeeded by the Department of Natural Resources, and in 1971, the legislature authorized the department to acquire the monument from the Rumseian Society. However, negotiations between the department and the society were unsuccessful. The department ceased operating the state park in 1978, and transferred its adjacent property to the corporation of Shepherdstown for use as a public park. The society retained ownership of the monument. In 1987, the monument and the four-acre park were added as a contributing property to the Shepherdstown Historic District on the National Register of Historic Places.

== Geography and setting ==
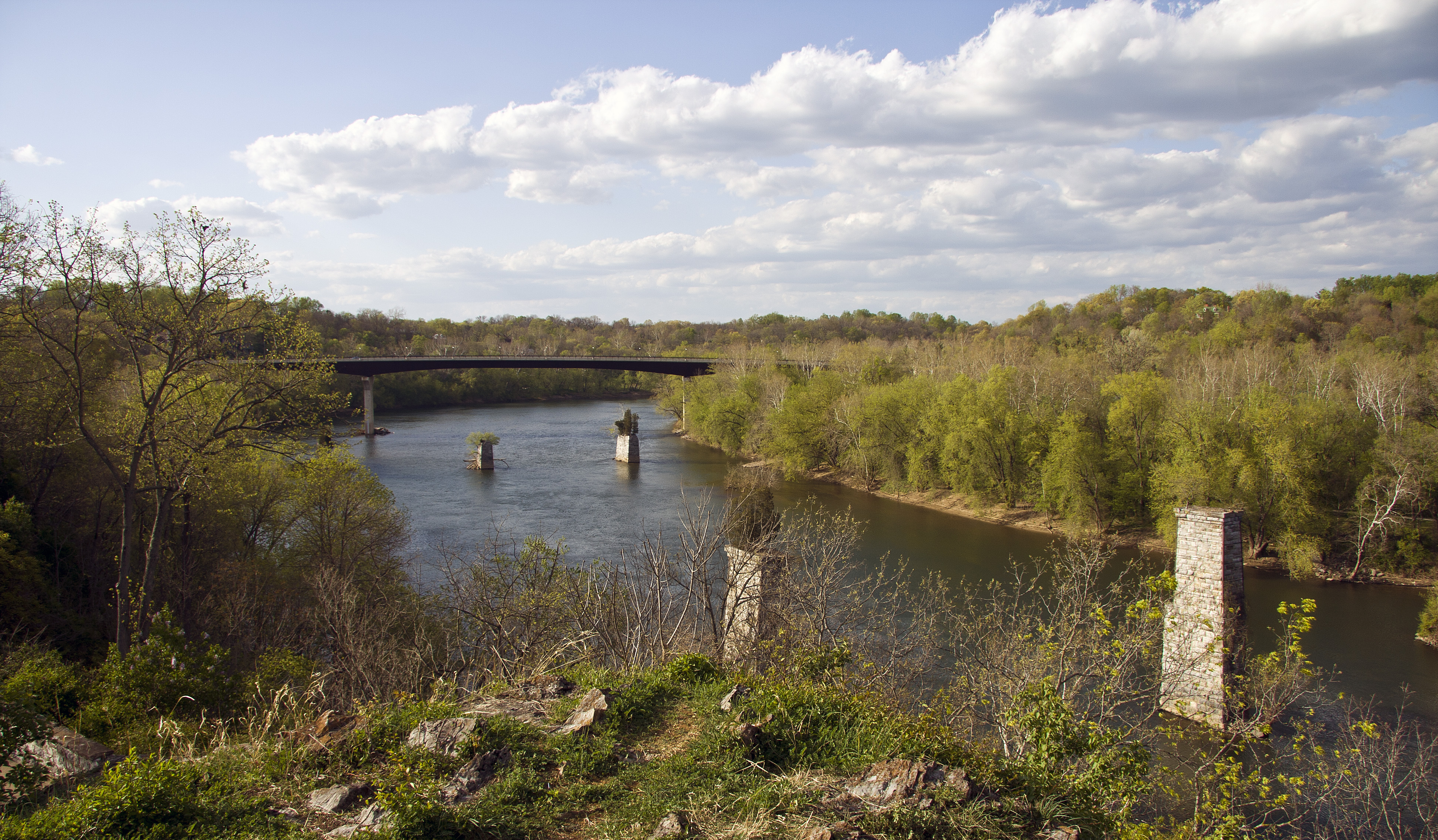
The Potomac River at Shepherdstown, as viewed from the monument

The James Rumsey Monument and surrounding park are located off Mill Street at the end of Rumsey Monument Road, within the eastern area of the corporation of Shepherdstown in Jefferson County, West Virginia. The site consists of a granite column monument atop a plinth, and a small adjacent park. It is situated atop a promontory overlooking the Potomac River at an elevation of 394 ft (120 m). The monument and park are surrounded by forested land. The platform around the monument's column provides a panoramic view of the Potomac River, the Chesapeake and Ohio Canal, the surrounding Potomac Valley, and the Blue Ridge Mountains.

The James Rumsey Monument is located approximately 1,490 ft (454 m) southeast of the New James Rumsey Bridge (Maryland Route 34), 878 ft (268 m) southeast of the confluence of Town Run with the Potomac River, 783 ft (239 m) southwest of the Chesapeake and Ohio Canal (on the Maryland side of the Potomac), and 345 ft (105 m) west of Shepherdstown Railroad Bridge. The monument is a contributing property to the Shepherdstown Historic District on the National Register of Historic Places.

== History ==
=== James Rumsey ===
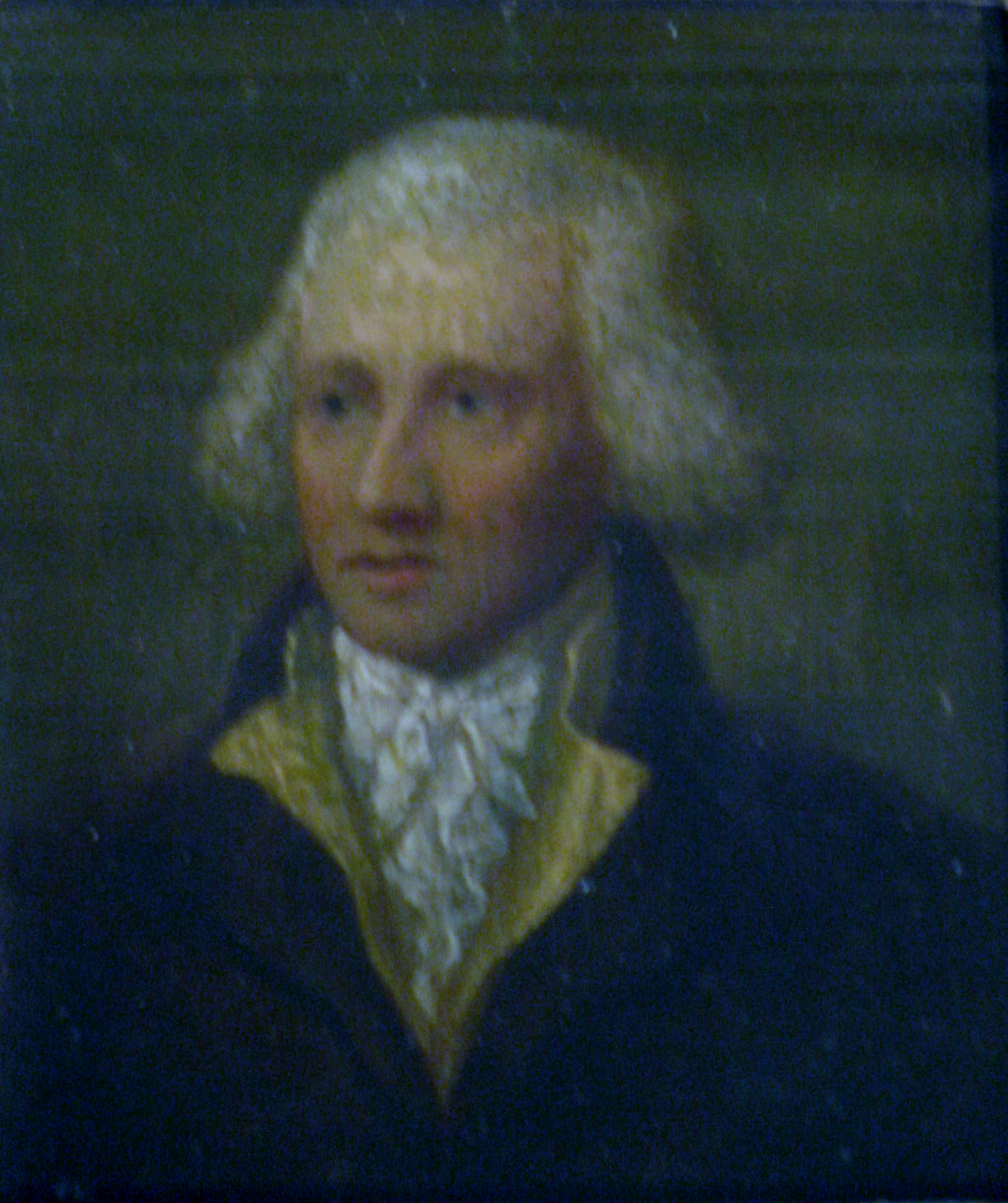
Portrait of Rumsey, c. 1790

James Rumsey was born in Bohemia Manor in Cecil County, Maryland, in March 1743. He left his family's farm to operate a tavern on the Bohemia River, moved to Baltimore, and in 1782, he purchased land along Sleepy Creek near Bath, Virginia (present-day Berkeley Springs, West Virginia). Rumsey relocated to the Bath area in 1783, and built and operated a sawmill on his Sleepy Creek property. Rumsey worked in Bath as an innkeeper, general store operator, builder, and millwright.

Rumsey was also an inventor and developed innovations in iron mining, smelting, gristmill and sawmill operation, and canal construction. His most significant invention was his development of steam power technology for operating water vessels. In October 1783, he successfully demonstrated a model steam-powered vessel on Sir John's Run at its confluence with the Potomac River, near the present-day community of Sir Johns Run. In Bath in September 1784, Rumsey met George Washington, who was traveling across the Blue Ridge Mountains to assess the feasibility of transportation by road, rivers, and canal. Washington was concerned with unifying the United States through increased trade and improved transportation routes across the Appalachian Mountains, especially via canals and rivers. Rumsey demonstrated to Washington a small, wooden, model steamboat that traveled upstream in Warm Spring Run. Washington was excited by the potential of Rumsey's boat, and Rumsey requested a written statement from Washington to solicit support, and funding from investors and the state of Virginia. Afterward, Washington publicly supported Rumsey over rival inventor John Fitch.

Rumsey relocated from Bath to Shepherdstown, which was closer to the Potomac River, where he tested his model steam-powered vessels. Rumsey was hired as superintendent of the Potomac Navigation Company in July 1785. In December 1785, Rumsey tested an improved version of the pipe boiler on the Potomac in Shepherdstown. In December 1787, he successfully demonstrated the practical utility of his steamboat invention in a public trial on the river. In 1788, following successful demonstrations, a group of investors that included Benjamin Franklin, established the Rumseian Society to promote and support Rumsey's work. In 1791, Rumsey traveled to England to obtain additional support and funding for his projects, and to register patents for his inventions. While in England, Rumsey became ill and died the day before a scheduled steamboat demonstration in London. His body was buried at St Margaret's, Westminster.

=== Monument establishment ===
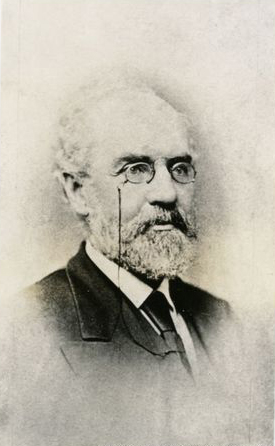
Portrait of Alexander Boteler, c. 1870. Boteler sought to raise money for a Rumsey monument

Interest in building a monument to Rumsey at Shepherdstown, and to the first successful public demonstration of his steamboat, began in the 19th century. Henry Bedinger, a witness of Rumsey's demonstration and an early proponent of a monument to Rumsey, wrote a letter to the United States Congress in 1836, in which Bedinger said he "would willingly contribute to the erection of a snug little monument." Congressman Alexander Boteler, another early proponent of building a monument to Rumsey, had a great interest in Rumsey and his invention, and possessed Rumsey's 1785 boiler. In October 1888, Boteler began an effort in Washington, D.C., to raise $1,000 for the construction of a Rumsey monument. In January 1903, West Virginia senator William Campbell introduced a bill to appropriate funds for a Rumsey monument. Prominent Jefferson County resident George Beltzhoover Jr. also took an interest in the movement to build a monument, and enlisted the support of the West Virginia Historical and Antiquarian Society under the leadership of W. S. Laidley.

In January 1905, Governor Albert B. White endorsed the monument in a message to the West Virginia Legislature. The following March, an extra session of legislature passed a general appropriations bill, which included a provision of $1,750 for the Rumsey monument (equivalent to $62,708 in 2025). The state senate had inserted $1,750 into the bill, which passed the House of Delegates unchallenged. Supporters of the Rumsey monument were disappointed with the small appropriation, which was a fraction of the $5,000 originally requested from the state legislature. By January 1907, Shepherdstown's town council passed an order to pay the society's treasurer $250 toward the monument (equivalent to $8,638 in 2025). In March that year, the West Virginia Legislature appropriated $2,000 for the proposed monument in the general appropriation bill for the 1907 and 1908 fiscal years (equivalent to $69,107 in 2025); Governor William M. O. Dawson, however, cut this appropriation along with several others before approving the bill.

The 1905 act appropriating $1,750 for the monument stipulated its construction should be facilitated by a chartered corporation for that expressed purpose. Accordingly, in February 1906, a meeting was held at Shepherd College to organize an association to facilitate the monument's construction. The meeting decided to proceed with incorporation as "The Rumseyan Society", selecting Beltzhoover as chairman, and Daniel B. Lucas, Beltzhoover, state senator Campbell, and William Price Craighill as incorporators. The meeting also agreed once the society secured a charter, the organization would elect a board of directors. In June 1906, the society was formally chartered to facilitate the monument's construction, following a meeting in Shepherdstown. The society's incorporators were elected as its board of directors with Lucas as president and Beltzhoover as vice president. Society members Lucas and Craighill were appointed to a committee to select a site for the monument. In August 1909, the society's officers prepared and exhibited a model of the proposed monument in Shepherdstown.

The Rumseian Society attempted to secure a site for the monument on a promontory along the Potomac River on property owned by the Norfolk and Western Railway. The site was known as "Crazy Rumsey's Walk" because Rumsey reportedly paced atop this location, meditating on his inventions, and it also overlooked the sites of many of Rumsey's early experiments on the river. Beginning in 1905, Lucas and the society sought to acquire a deed to the Norfolk and Western right-of-way at the promontory site. By January 1907, a Rumseian Society committee including Beltzhoover and state senator Campbell traveled to Philadelphia to meet with Joseph I. Doran, the chief counsel for Norfolk and Western. The company agreed to transfer property at the selected promontory site and a deed to the property was executed. The promontory property was subject to a mortgage with stringent conditions, requiring the company to charge the Rumseian Society for the deed. Norfolk and Western officials expressed their support for the monument project. On August 16, 1907, Beltzhoover and Lucas transferred 0.64 acres (0.26 ha) to the Rumseian Society for the monument's construction. In April 1910, Governor William E. Glasscock visited Shepherdstown and formally designated the monument site. In 1915, the society agreed to pay property owner U. S. Martin $300 (equivalent to $9,548 in 2025) for his alleged rights to the land purchased from the railway to avoid further delay to construction and the potential for litigation.

The monument's cost was $15,200 (equivalent to $544,667 in 2025). In December 1914, the society held a meeting with representatives of firms that competed to design and build the monument, and by June 1915, the Rumseian Society contracted with the Forbes Granite Company of Chambersburg, Pennsylvania, which had previously built the Indiana Monument at the nearby Antietam National Battlefield, to build the monument.

=== Monument construction and initial use ===
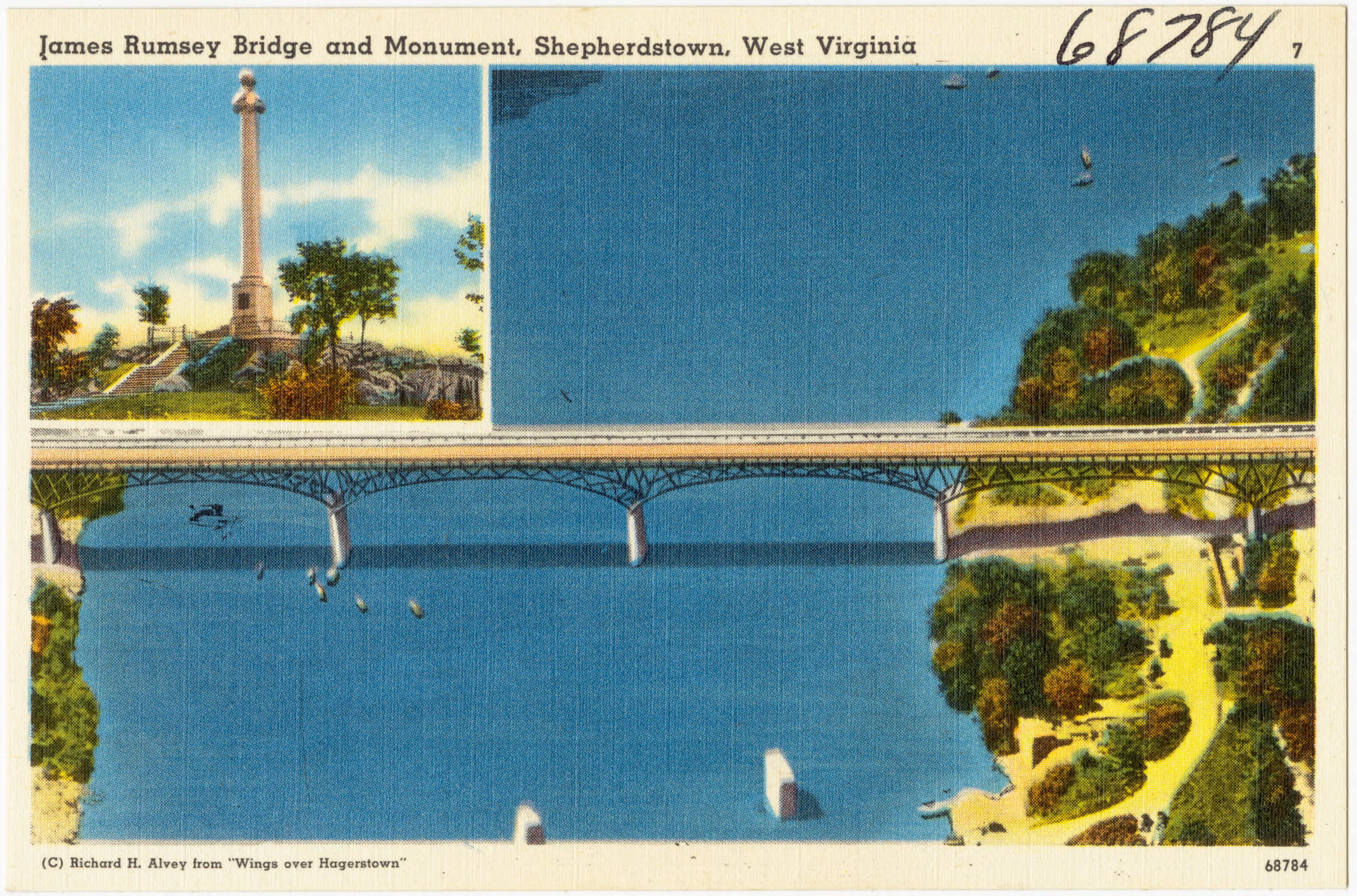
Postcard of the monument and old James Rumsey Bridge

Construction commenced on July 7, 1915; contractor William J. Britner prepared the site and carried out preliminary construction work for the concrete platform. By July 22, workers had made considerable progress toward the construction; blasting atop the bluff was nearly completed and construction of the concrete platform and the blue limestone wall surrounding the platform had begun. The Forbes Granite Company selected Woodstock granite for the monument, and contracted with the Guilford and Watersville Granite Company of Baltimore, which operated quarries in Woodstock. At that time, the monument's column was projected to weigh approximately 300 short tons (270 t) and the granite base projected to weigh between 25 and 30 short tons (23 and 27 t). By August 1915, initial site work was completed and prepared for the arrival of the three railcar-loads of granite for the monument's base and shaft. In October 1915, contractor H. R. Forbes notified the society Norfolk and Western had confirmed the switch leading from the railway to the construction site would be completed that month, allowing for the transport of granite to the site. By January 1916, Forbes had completed the monument's base and pedestal to support the column.

The monument's dedication was originally scheduled for July 4, 1916, but this was delayed by changes to the monument's construction plan. The base of the column was originally planned to be fabricated in one piece but Forbes then fabricated it in four pieces in Chambersburg. In February 1916, the company received two pieces of Oregon fir lumber and built an 80 ft (24 m) derrick to lift the 75 ft (23 m) column into place. On March 21, the granite globe weighing 8 short tons (7.3 t) was placed atop the column, completing construction of the monument's columnar section. However, the plinth remained under construction. The brass plaques arrived and were installed in August 1916, and the boundary stone walls and landscaping took slightly longer to complete.

Following its completion, the monument hosted history-related events that included exercises hosted by the Daughters of the American Revolution. The monument became a tourist attraction and local retailers, including B. S. Pendleton and Owens' Drug Store, sold Rumsey Monument postcards. In 1931 and 1935, the state's department of agriculture included the monument in illustrated publications highlighting West Virginia's sites of historic and scenic interest. In 1955, residents of Shepherdstown gifted a plaque carved with Rumsey's achievements to St Margaret's church in Westminster, England, where he was buried.

=== State and municipal parks ===
- James Rumsey Monument
- U.S. Historic district – Contributing property
- Location: Rumsey Monument Road, Shepherdstown, West Virginia
- Area: 4.09 acres (2 ha)
- Built: 1916
- Part of: Shepherdstown Historic District (ID87001205)
- Added to NRHP: July 22, 1987

In 1925, the West Virginia Legislature established the State Forest, Park and Conservation Commission. In 1927, the Commission provided its recommendations to the legislature, which included a recommendation for a State Monument System. In its list of extant historical monuments to be included in this system, the Commission included the James Rumsey Monument.

The monument became a state park in 1956, when the West Virginia Legislature transferred its operation to the West Virginia Conservation Commission's Division of State Parks, which gave the employees of Cacapon Resort State Park, under the supervision of ranger James Ambrose, responsibility of maintaining the monument's grounds. The monument site remained under the Rumseian Society's ownership while the Division of State Parks operated the site as a state park. A 1960 National Park Service survey of U.S. state parks classified the park as a "state monument" and noted its lack of water recreation, and overnight and dining accommodations. The state ceased paying for the park's maintenance in the 1960s, after which private efforts kept the park from deteriorating. The monument's lilac garden was listed in 1960 and 1974 guides to American gardens; author Harry Britton Logan wrote the monument was "well worth a visit in early spring".

The state's Conservation Commission was succeeded by the Department of Natural Resources and in 1971, the West Virginia Legislature passed House Bill 1151, which authorized the department to acquire the monument site from the Rumseian Society and allocated $15,000 for the acquisition (equivalent to $119,248 in 2025). Negotiations with the society were unsuccessful and the department was unable to acquire the monument. Instead, the department used $13,750 (equivalent to $109,311 in 2025) of the original allocation to purchase 3.45 acres (1.40 ha) of land adjoining the monument site. In December 1974, Shepherdstown presented its first official seal, which included the monument as part of a montage of local landmarks.

The Department of Natural Resources ceased operation of the state park on November 6, 1978, when it transferred the 3.45 acres (1.40 ha) to the corporation of Shepherdstown for use as a municipal park adjoining the monument site. In 1987, members of the Rumseian Society built a half-scale model of Rumsey's steamboat. The society sponsors the Rumsey Regatta, in which it runs its model up and down the Potomac. On July 22, 1987, the monument and the adjoining park were added as a contributing property to the Shepherdstown Historic District on the National Register of Historic Places. The Rumseian Society donated the monument to the corporation of Shepherdstown in 2007. In November 2019, Shepherdstown's Parks and Recreation Committee and its Tree Commission planted a monarch butterfly waystation at the foot of the steps leading to the monument. As of 2022, the corporation of Shepherdstown refers to the monument and park together as "Rumsey Monument Park", which is administered by the corporation's Parks and Recreation Committee.

== Monument description ==
The James Rumsey Monument consists of a 75 ft (23 m) fluted, Ionic column that is made of gray, hammered, Woodstock granite. The column is capped by a polished, granite globe upon which the outlines of all continents are inscribed. The column stands atop a tall, concrete plinth consisting of a 40 sq ft (3.7 m^{2}) plaza. The 1927 West Virginia Blue Book described the monument's column as "a towering shaft". The monument is accessed by a stairway that leads to the bluff, where the monument's concrete plinth is enclosed by an iron railing. The monument's park is surrounded by a stone wall.

Two plaques are affixed to the monument; the front plaque bears a text inscription and the rear plaque bears an image approximating Rumsey's steamboat that is approximately the size of a small skiff with a steam engine at the center of the vessel near a rower. Beltzhoover drafted the front plaque's text, which is not historically accurate because Rumsey did not build and test a full-sized steamboat at the 1783 trial at Sir John's Run. The following text inscription appears on the front plaque:

IN HONOR OF JAMES RUMSEY INVENTOR OF THE STEAMBOAT

Who in October, A. D. 1783, on the Potomac River, near the mouth of Sir John's Run, made the first successful application of steam to the practical purposes of navigation and who on December 3rd, 1787, made a further successful demonstration on the Potomac River at Shepherdstown, Virginia, about three hundreds yards above this site.

Erected by The State of West Virginia Under the auspices of The Rumseyan Society A. D. 1915

== See also ==
- List of West Virginia state parks
- National Register of Historic Places listings in Jefferson County, West Virginia
- Shepherdstown Historic District

== Bibliography ==
- Bushong, Millard Kessler (1941). A History of Jefferson County, West Virginia. Charles Town, West Virginia: Jefferson Publishing Company. OCLC 1724155. Archived from the original on February 28, 2022 – via HathiTrust.
- Chambers, S. Allen (2004). Buildings of West Virginia. Oxford, England; New York City, New York: Oxford University Press. ISBN 978-0-19-516548-7. OCLC 53315276.
- Dandridge, Danske (1910). Historic Shepherdstown. Charlottesville, Virginia: The Michie Company, Printers. OCLC 560343814. Archived from the original on February 27, 2022 – via HathiTrust.
- Frohman, Louis H.; Elliot, Jean (1960). A Pictorial Guide to American Gardens. New York City, New York: Crown Publishers. LCCN 60008622. OCLC 1151002355 – via the Internet Archive.
- Harris, John T., ed. (1927). "West Virginia Legislative Hand Book and Manual and Official Register" (PDF). West Virginia Blue Book. Charleston, West Virginia. ISSN 0364-7323. OCLC 1251675. Archived (PDF) from the original on April 27, 2021.
- Jefferson County Parks and Recreation Commission (November 2016). Jefferson County Parks and Recreation 2026 Master Plan. Charles Town, West Virginia: Jefferson County Parks and Recreation Commission. Archived from the original on January 9, 2022.
- Logan, Harry Britton (1974). A Traveler's Guide to North American Gardens. New York City, New York: Scribner. ISBN 0684134934. OCLC 1036954853 – via the Internet Archive.
- National Park Service (1960). State Parks: Areas, Acreages and Accommodations. Washington, D.C.: United States Department of the Interior National Park Service. OCLC 5217001 – via the Internet Archive.
- Reed, Paula Stoner (May 26, 1987). National Register of Historic Places Registration Form: Shepherdstown Historic District (Boundary Increase) (PDF). Charleston, West Virginia: United States Department of the Interior, National Park Service. Archived (PDF) from the original on March 5, 2022.
- Sutcliffe, Andrea J. (2004). Steam: The Untold Story of America's First Great Invention. New York City, New York: Palgrave Macmillan. ISBN 978-1-40-396899-9. OCLC 1114074744 – via the Internet Archive.
- Turner, Ella May (1930). James Rumsey: Pioneer in Steam Navigation. Scottdale, Pennsylvania: Mennonite Publishing House. OCLC 603011457. Archived from the original on February 27, 2022 – via HathiTrust.
- West Virginia State Park History Committee (1988). Where People and Nature Meet: A History of the West Virginia State Parks. Charleston, West Virginia: Pictorial Histories Publishing Company. ISBN 978-0-933126-91-6. OCLC 22116273.
