= 1992 United States Senate election in Kentucky =

- November 3, 1992
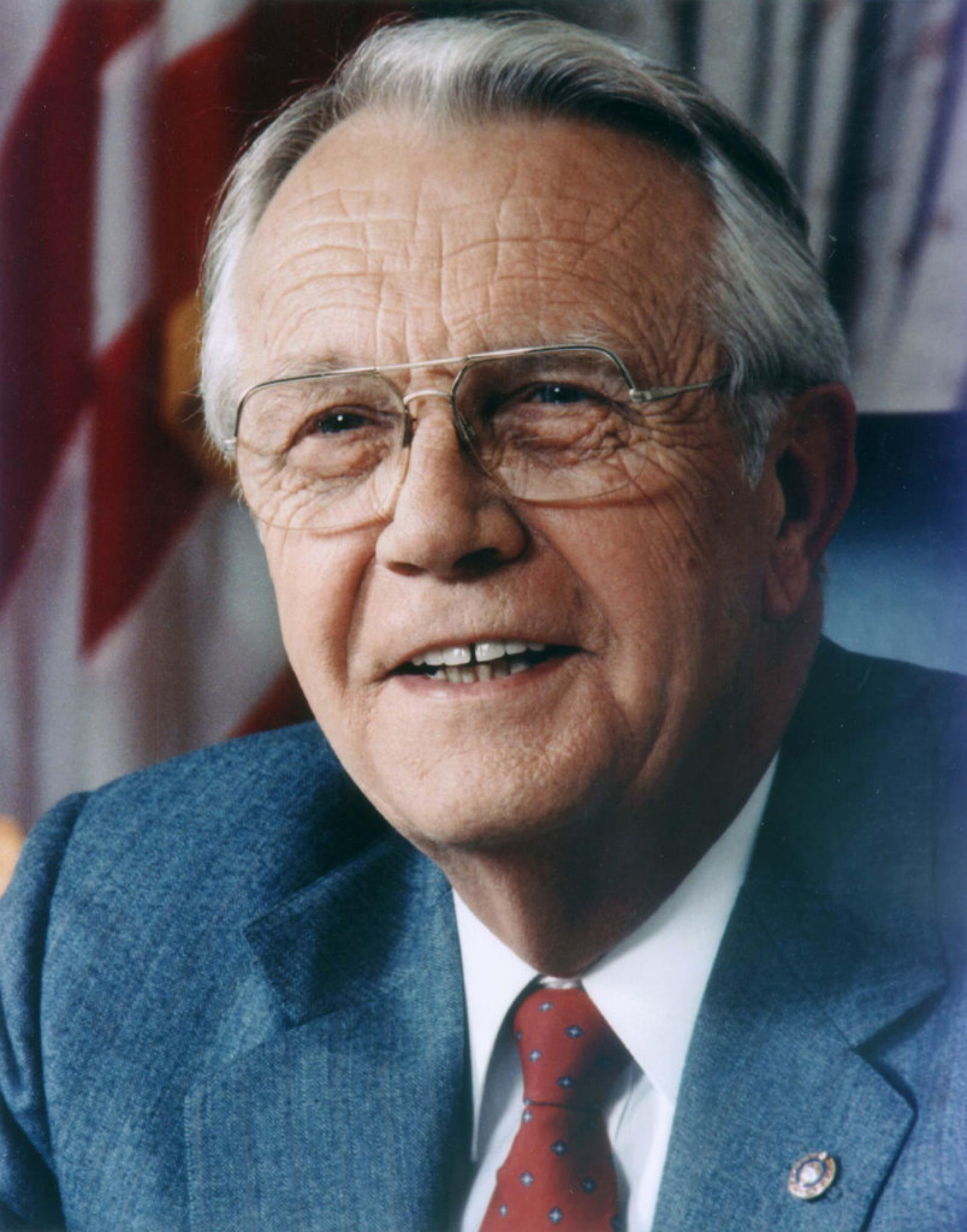

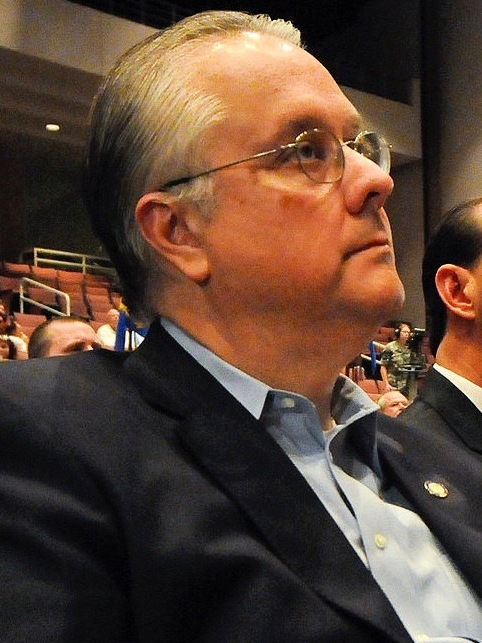
Nominee	Wendell Ford	David L. Williams
Party	Democratic	Republican
Popular vote	836,888	476,604
Percentage	62.88%	35.81%
- County results Ford: 40–50% 50–60% 60–70% 70–80% 80–90% Williams: 40–50% 50–60% 60–70% 70–80%
U.S. senator before election
Wendell Ford
Democratic
Elected U.S. Senator
Wendell Ford
Democratic

The 1992 United States Senate election in Kentucky took place on November 3, 1992. It was concurrent with elections to the United States House of Representatives. Incumbent Senator Wendell Ford won reelection to a fourth and final term. As of 2026, this was the last time Democrats won a U.S. Senate election in Kentucky.

== Republican primary ==
=== Candidates ===
- Denny Ormerod, machinist
- Phillip Thompson, executive director of the Kentucky Republican Party
- David L. Williams, State Senator

=== Campaign ===
Denny Ormerod, a machinist from Louisville dropped out before the primary election. Though Williams and Thompson represented opposing factions in the state Republican Party – Williams managed Larry Hopkins' 1991 primary campaign while Thompson worked full-time for Hopkins' primary opponent Larry Forgy – the two virtually ignored each other in the primary campaign, choosing instead to focus their rhetoric against Ford. Thompson did question Williams' conservative credentials on grounds that he voted in favor of the tax increase associated with the Kentucky Education Reform Act. Ormerod's campaign largely focused on socially conservative issues, but it was Williams who secured the endorsement of Kentucky Right to Life, who cited his lawsuit to free three anti-abortion bills from committee in the 1992 legislative session. As a result of the largely uninspiring primary campaigns, there was only an 18% voter turnout in the Republican primary. Williams won the nomination.

=== Results ===
Republican primary results
Party	Candidate	Votes	%
Republican	David Williams	49,880	60.9%
Republican	Phillip Thompson	25,026	30.5%
Republican	Denny Ormerod	7,066	8.6%

== General election ==
=== Candidates ===
- Wendell Ford (D), incumbent U.S. Senator
- James Ridenour (L)
- David L. Williams (R), State Senator

=== Campaign ===
Ford, the Senate Majority Whip and a former governor, raised $2.4 million for his campaign, about eight times the amount Williams raised. Given his limited finances, Williams relied on news conferences and interviews on small town radio stations to get his message out. Williams repeatedly lamented that Ford would not agree to a formal debate; Ford said that could not be arranged because Congress was still in session and he needed to be in Washington. During the campaign, Williams attempted to paint Ford as too liberal for Kentucky voters, citing his votes against the Gulf War and Clarence Thomas' confirmation to the U.S. Supreme Court. Both candidates declared their support for a Balanced Budget Amendment, but Williams said that Ford's support of pork barrel projects for the state and a procedural vote that kept the amendment from a vote in 1991 were evidence that Ford's support was not genuine.

=== Results ===
Ford had no trouble winning on election night. Ford won easily, despite the fact that fellow Democrat Bill Clinton was not declared the winner of the presidential race in Kentucky until around 10:00 E.S.T. Ford pulled big margins out of the majority of Kentucky's 120 counties. This would be Ford's last term in the senate. He served his final term from January 3, 1993, to January 3, 1999. Ford died sixteen years after his retirement at the age of 90 in January 2015.

General election results
Party	Candidate	Votes	%
Democratic	Wendell H. Ford (incumbent)	836,888	62.88%
Republican	David L. Williams	476,604	35.81%
Libertarian	James A. Ridenour	17,366	1.30%
Democratic hold			

==== By county ====
County	Ford#	Ford%	Williams#	Williams%	Ridenour#	Ridenour%
Adair	2,378	41.69%	3,280	57.51%	45	0.8%
Allen	2,203	47.29%	2,417	51.89%	38	0.82%
Anderson	3,543	61.42%	2,145	37.19%	80	1.39%
Ballard	3,128	83.61%	579	15.48%	34	0.91%
Barren	6,990	61.05%	4,375	38.21%	85	0.74%
Bath	2,616	77.51%	724	21.45%	35	1.04%
Bell	5,364	63.77%	2,901	34.49%	147	1.74%
Boone	11,372	53.49%	9,525	44.80%	364	1.71%
Bourbon	4,188	69.17%	1,777	29.35%	90	1.48%
Boyd	13,256	67.92%	6,076	31.13%	184	0.95%
Boyle	5,025	60.48%	3,210	38.64%	73	0.88%
Bracken	1,740	72.90%	609	25.51%	38	1.59%
Breathitt	3,910	80.24%	931	19.10%	32	0.66%
Breckinridge	4,314	66.70%	2,112	32.65%	42	0.65%
Bullitt	10,954	63.05%	6,205	35.71%	216	1.24%
Butler	1,817	44.34%	2,255	55.03%	26	0.63%
Caldwell	3,644	68.69%	1,626	30.65%	35	0.66%
Calloway	7,452	64.06%	4,058	34.89%	122	1.05%
Campbell	15,765	57.38%	11,181	40.69%	531	1.93%
Carlisle	1,760	78.12%	480	21.30%	13	0.58%
Carroll	2,449	77.28%	664	20.95%	56	1.77%
Carter	4,973	64.95%	2,628	34.32%	56	0.73%
Casey	1,832	41.02%	2,581	57.79%	53	1.19%
Christian	7,982	55.71%	6,210	43.34%	136	0.95%
Clark	6,106	63.24%	3,442	35.65%	107	1.11%
Clay	2,250	40.81%	3,210	58.23%	53	0.96%
Clinton	1,297	36.42%	2,222	62.40%	42	1.18%
Crittenden	2,120	63.26%	1,210	36.11%	21	0.63%
Cumberland	1,041	36.46%	1,804	63.19%	10	0.35%
Daviess	22,194	67.16%	10,374	31.39%	478	1.45%
Edmonson	1,782	45.86%	2,082	53.57%	22	0.57%
Elliott	1,944	86.90%	268	11.98%	25	1.12%
Estill	2,623	55.96%	2,013	42.95%	51	1.09%
Fayette	45,941	56.29%	34,047	41.72%	1,621	1.99%
Fleming	2,909	67.95%	1,321	30.86%	51	1.19%
Floyd	13,138	84.67%	2,223	14.33%	155	1.00%
Franklin	12,717	70.40%	4,986	27.60%	362	2.00%
Fulton	1,999	75.60%	616	23.30%	29	1.10%
Gallatin	1,419	75.16%	432	22.88%	37	1.96%
Garrard	2,359	55.00%	1,901	44.32%	29	0.68%
Grant	3,297	69.87%	1,338	28.35%	84	1.78%
Graves	9,596	74.69%	3,115	24.24%	137	1.07%
Grayson	3,753	49.81%	3,694	49.02%	88	1.17%
Green	2,100	46.48%	2,394	52.99%	24	0.53%
Greenup	8,691	67.36%	4,096	31.74%	116	0.90%
Hancock	2,141	69.47%	855	27.74%	86	2.79%
Hardin	14,858	62.15%	8,728	36.51%	321	1.34%
Harlan	7,370	73.96%	2,500	25.09%	95	0.95%
Harrison	4,084	71.53%	1,567	27.44%	59	1.03%
Hart	3,351	65.35%	1,744	34.01%	33	0.64%
Henderson	10,891	72.82%	3,912	26.15%	154	1.03%
Henry	3,483	75.54%	1,065	23.09%	63	1.37%
Hickman	1,808	77.33%	493	21.09%	37	1.58%
Hopkins	11,672	73.07%	4,127	25.84%	174	1.09%
Jackson	1,011	28.16%	2,543	70.84%	36	1.00%
Jefferson	195,253	64.96%	100,956	33.58%	4,379	1.46%
Jessamine	5,778	52.55%	5,101	46.39%	117	1.06%
Johnson	4,672	63.05%	2,650	35.76%	88	1.19%
Kenton	24,978	53.01%	21,040	44.66%	1,098	2.33%
Knott	5,299	85.87%	799	12.95%	73	1.18%
Knox	4,594	56.58%	3,443	42.41%	82	1.01%
LaRue	3,006	67.37%	1,412	31.64%	44	0.99%
Laurel	6,202	46.12%	7,127	53.00%	119	0.88%
Lawrence	2,813	63.17%	1,601	35.95%	39	0.88%
Lee	1,395	53.02%	1,207	45.88%	29	1.10%
Leslie	1,766	44.62%	2,171	54.85%	21	0.53%
Letcher	5,488	74.26%	1,775	24.02%	127	1.72%
Lewis	2,001	47.87%	2,122	50.77%	57	1.36%
Lincoln	3,501	62.54%	2,049	36.60%	48	0.86%
Livingston	2,886	75.71%	876	22.98%	50	1.31%
Logan	4,903	61.77%	2,953	37.20%	82	1.03%
Lyon	1,998	76.17%	596	22.72%	29	1.11%
Madison	10,976	60.69%	6,914	38.23%	196	1.08%
Magoffin	3,256	70.17%	1,327	28.60%	57	1.23%
Marion	4,149	77.71%	1,125	21.07%	65	1.22%
Marshall	8,648	72.47%	3,199	26.80%	87	0.73%
Martin	2,097	58.09%	1,466	40.61%	47	1.30%
Mason	3,552	66.45%	1,737	32.50%	56	1.05%
McCracken	17,841	70.58%	7,262	28.73%	175	0.69%
McCreary	1,853	47.55%	1,948	49.99%	96	2.46%
McLean	2,759	73.12%	967	25.63%	47	1.25%
Meade	4,776	70.60%	1,891	27.95%	98	1.45%
Menifee	1,423	77.72%	391	21.35%	17	0.93%
Mercer	3,829	62.23%	2,195	35.67%	129	2.10%
Metcalfe	1,895	57.27%	1,377	41.61%	37	1.12%
Monroe	1,464	35.46%	2,618	63.40%	47	1.14%
Montgomery	4,719	72.88%	1,669	25.78%	87	1.34%
Morgan	2,928	81.70%	620	17.30%	36	1.00%
Muhlenberg	8,685	74.52%	2,870	24.63%	99	0.85%
Nelson	6,617	68.88%	2,827	29.42%	163	1.70%
Nicholas	1,597	74.56%	492	22.97%	53	2.47%
Ohio	5,106	62.61%	2,985	36.60%	64	0.79%
Oldham	7,612	50.16%	7,425	48.93%	138	0.91%
Owen	2,418	75.09%	765	23.76%	37	1.15%
Owsley	854	53.68%	717	45.07%	20	1.25%
Pendleton	2,480	68.64%	1,047	28.98%	86	2.38%
Perry	6,656	70.04%	2,768	29.13%	79	0.83%
Pike	18,032	73.43%	6,372	25.95%	153	0.62%
Powell	2,586	67.50%	1,174	30.65%	71	1.85%
Pulaski	7,623	48.50%	7,964	50.66%	132	0.84%
Robertson	582	71.94%	217	26.82%	10	1.24%
Rockcastle	1,839	41.83%	2,533	57.62%	24	0.55%
Rowan	4,572	70.80%	1,819	28.17%	67	1.03%
Russell	2,560	39.02%	3,953	60.25%	48	0.73%
Scott	5,305	63.80%	2,913	35.03%	97	1.17%
Shelby	5,754	61.05%	3,577	37.95%	94	1.00%
Simpson	2,991	62.08%	1,789	37.13%	38	0.79%
Spencer	1,862	69.37%	793	29.55%	29	1.08%
Taylor	4,413	53.56%	3,780	45.88%	46	0.56%
Todd	1,893	62.70%	1,050	34.78%	76	2.52%
Trigg	2,804	67.55%	1,283	30.91%	64	1.54%
Trimble	1,905	75.78%	583	23.19%	26	1.03%
Union	4,286	80.75%	981	18.48%	41	0.77%
Warren	14,177	50.62%	13,558	48.41%	273	0.97%
Washington	2,502	64.34%	1,315	33.81%	72	1.85%
Wayne	2,675	50.34%	2,590	48.74%	49	0.92%
Webster	4,240	81.59%	894	17.20%	63	1.21%
Whitley	4,610	50.38%	4,404	48.13%	136	1.49%
Wolfe	1,730	78.64%	441	20.05%	29	1.31%
Woodford	4,624	57.85%	3,270	40.91%	99	1.24%

== See also ==
- 1992 United States Senate elections
- 1992 United States presidential election
- 1992 United States elections
