= James Rumsey Technical Institute =

Coordinates: 39°31′59″N 77°58′48″W

- Type: Public coeducational
- Established: 1967
- Principal: Russell Penner
- Director: Russell Penner
- Students: 191
- Location: Martinsburg, WV, USA
- Website: www.jamesrumsey.com
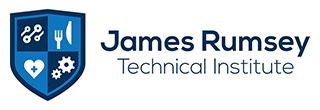

The James Rumsey Technical Institute (JRTI) is a technical institute in Martinsburg, West Virginia. It is named after James Rumsey, an American mechanical engineer and inventor from Shepherdstown, West Virginia. JRTI was founded on March 25, 1969.

== Accreditation ==
James Rumsey Technical Institute is accredited by the Council on Occupational Education.
