= 1974 United States Senate election in Kentucky =

- November 5, 1974
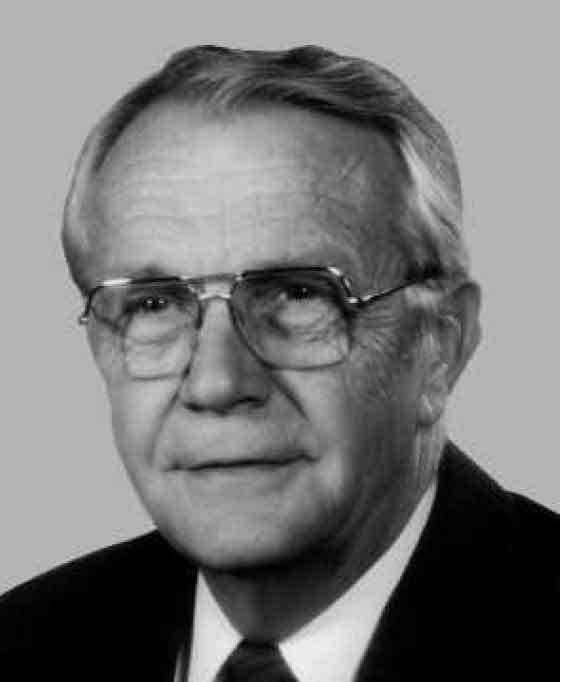

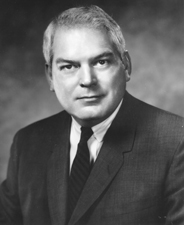
Nominee	Wendell Ford	Marlow Cook
Party	Democratic	Republican
Popular vote	398,887	328,260
Percentage	53.56%	44.08%
- County results Ford: 40–50% 50–60% 60–70% 70–80% Cook: 40–50% 50–60% 60–70% 70–80%
U.S. senator before election
Marlow Cook
Republican
Elected U.S. Senator
Wendell Ford
Democratic

The 1974 United States Senate election in Kentucky took place on November 5, 1974. Incumbent Republican U.S. Senator Marlow Cook ran for a second term in office but was defeated by Democratic Governor of Kentucky Wendell Ford.

== Republican primary ==
=== Candidates ===
- Marlow Cook, incumbent senator
- Thurman Jerome Hamlin
- Tommy Klein

=== Results ===
Republican primary results
Party	Candidate	Votes	%
Republican	Marlow Cook (incumbent)	35,904	87.60%
Republican	Thurman Jerome Hamlin	2,826	6.90%
Republican	Tommy Klein	2,256	5.50%
Total votes		40,986	100.00%

== Democratic primary ==
=== Candidates ===
- Harvey E. Brazin
- Wendell Ford, governor of Kentucky

=== Results ===
Democratic primary results
Party	Candidate	Votes	%
Democratic	Wendell Ford	136,458	84.81%
Democratic	Harvey E. Brazin	24,436	15.19%
Total votes		160,894	100.00%

== General election ==
=== Results ===
1974 United States Senate election in Kentucky
Party	Candidate	Votes	%	±%
Democratic	Wendell Ford	398,887	53.56%	▲5.94
Republican	Marlow Cook (incumbent)	328,260	44.08%	▼7.28
American Independent	W. Ed Parker	17,551	2.63%	▲1.31
Total votes		744,698	100.00%	
Democratic gain from Republican		Swing		

== See also ==
- 1974 United States Senate elections
