= 1968 United States Senate election in Kentucky =

- November 5, 1968
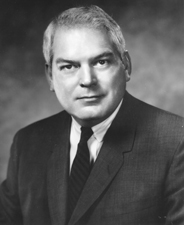

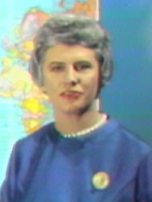
Nominee	Marlow Cook	Katherine Peden
Party	Republican	Democratic
Popular vote	484,260	448,960
Percentage	51.36%	47.62%
- County results Cook: 40–50% 50–60% 60–70% 70–80% 80–90% Peden: 40–50% 50–60% 60–70% 70–80%
U.S. senator before election
Thruston Morton
Republican
Elected U.S. Senator
Marlow Cook
Republican

The 1968 United States Senate election in Kentucky took place on November 5, 1968. Incumbent Republican U.S. Senator Thruston Morton retired from office. Jefferson County Judge (the equivalent of a County Executive) Marlow Cook won the open seat.

== Republican primary ==
=== Candidates ===
- Marlow Cook, Jefferson County Judge
- Eugene Siler, former U.S. Representative
- Thurman Jerome Hamlin, perennial candidate
- E. W. Kemp

=== Results ===
Republican primary results
Party	Candidate	Votes	%
Republican	Marlow Cook	73,171	61.99%
Republican	Eugene Siler	39,743	33.67%
Republican	E.W. Kemp	3,104	2.63%
Republican	Thurman Jerome Hamlin	2,015	1.71%
Total votes		118,033	100.00%

== Democratic primary ==
=== Candidates ===
- Katherine Peden, Commissioner of Commerce
- John Y. Brown Sr., former U.S. Representative
- Foster Ockerman, former State Representative
- Ted Osborn, State Representative

=== Results ===
Democratic primary results
Party	Candidate	Votes	%
Democratic	Katherine Peden	86,317	42.51%
Democratic	John Y. Brown	51,509	25.37%
Democratic	Foster Ockerman	25,602	12.61%
Democratic	Ted R. Osborn	20,049	9.88%
Democratic	Others	19,560	9.63%
Total votes		203,037	100.00%

== General election ==
=== Results ===
1968 U.S. Senate election in Kentucky
Party	Candidate	Votes	%
Republican	Marlow Cook	484,260	51.36%
Democratic	Katherine Peden	448,960	47.62%
American Independent	Duane F. Olsen	9,645	1.02%
Majority		35,300	3.74%
Turnout		942,865	
Republican hold			

== See also ==
- 1968 United States Senate elections
