= 1986 United States Senate election in Kentucky =

- November 4, 1986
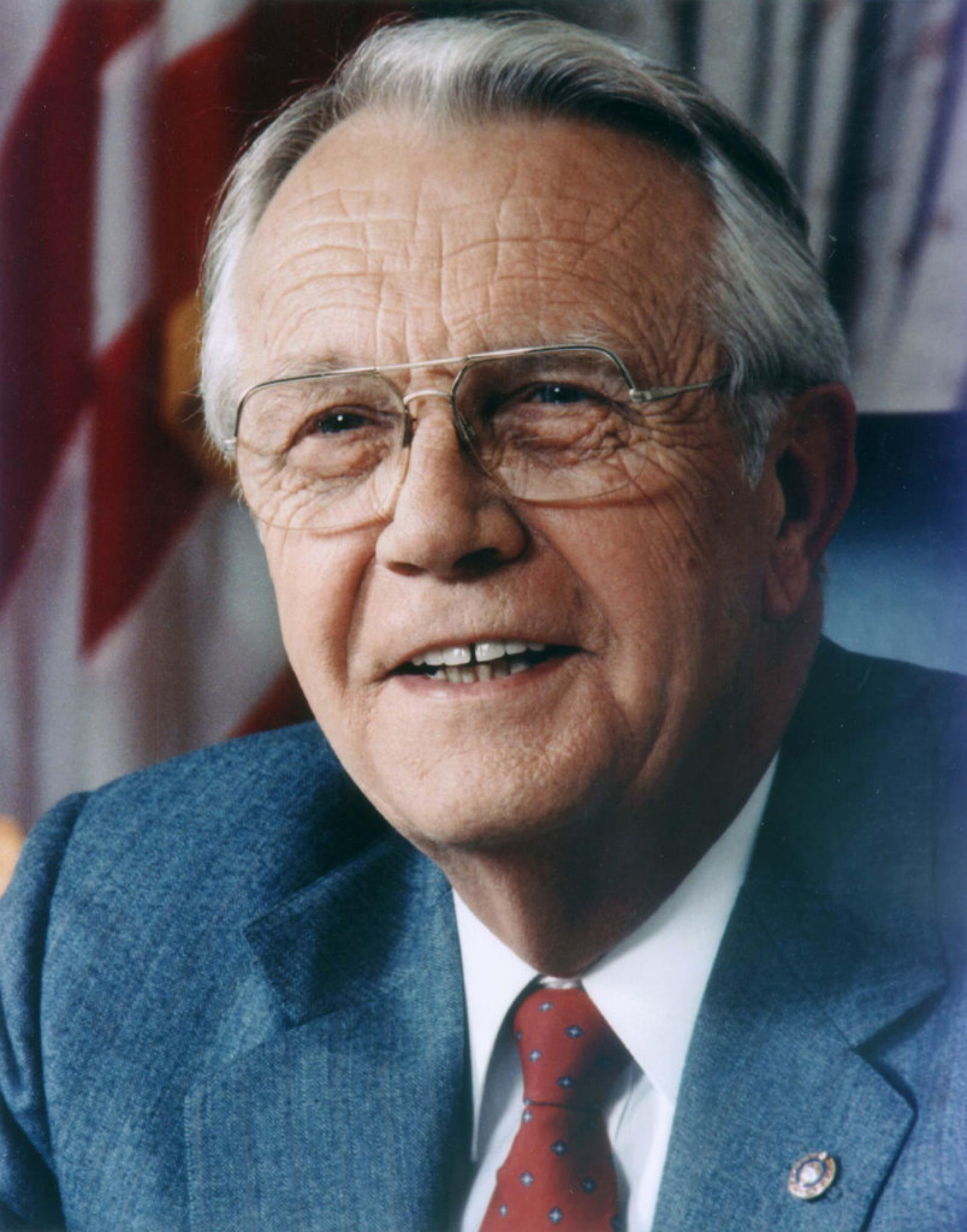

Nominee	Wendell Ford	Jackson Andrews
Party	Democratic	Republican
Popular vote	503,775	173,330
Percentage	74.40%	25.60%
- Ford: 50–60% 60–70% 70–80% 80–90% >90% Andrews: 50–60% 60–70% 70–80% 80–90% Tie No Votes
U.S. senator before election
Wendell Ford
Democratic
Elected U.S. Senator
Wendell Ford
Democratic

The 1986 United States Senate election in Kentucky was held on November 4, 1986, concurrently with other elections to the United States Senate in other states as well as elections to the United States House of Representatives and various state and local elections. Incumbent Democrat Wendell Ford won re-election in a landslide against Republican Jackson Andrews, winning every county in the state.

== Democratic primary ==
Wendell Ford was unchallenged.

== Republican primary ==
=== Candidates ===
- Jackson Andrews, attorney
- Carl Brown
- Tommy Klein
- Thurman Jerome Hamlin

=== Results ===
Republican Party primary results
Party	Candidate	Votes	%
Republican	Jackson Andrews	16,211	38.98%
Republican	Carl Brown	9,724	23.38%
Republican	Tommy Klein	8,595	20.67%
Republican	Thurman Jerome Hamlin	7,062	16.98%

== Results ==
General election results
Party	Candidate	Votes	%
Democratic	Wendell Ford (incumbent)	503,775	74.40%
Republican	Jackson Andrews	173,330	25.60%
Democratic hold			

== See also ==
- 1986 United States Senate elections
