= Christine Johnson (actress) =

American contralto opera star

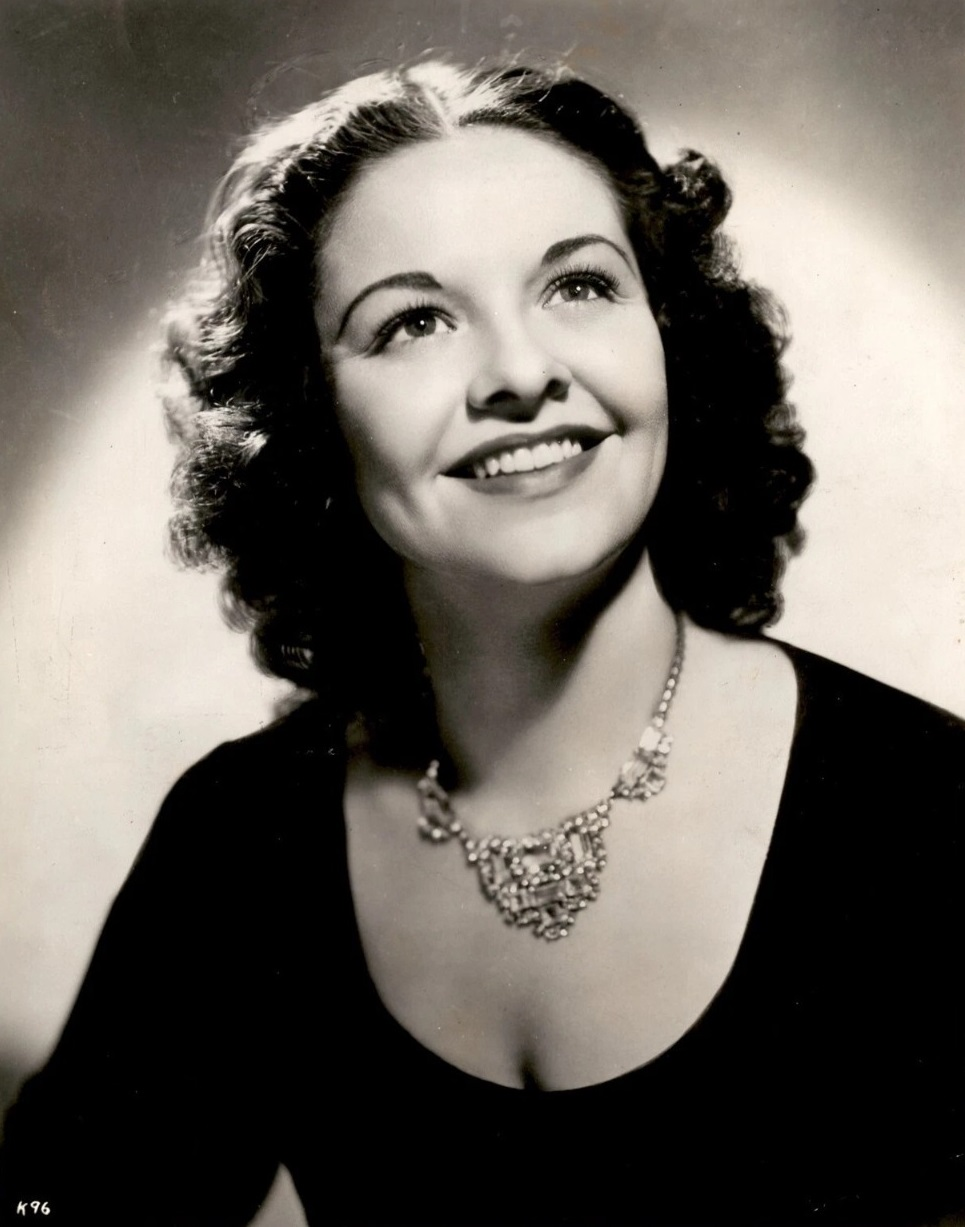
- Johnson in 1951
- Born: 8 September 1911; Hopkinsville, Kentucky, U.S.
- Died: 9 June 2010 (aged 98); Owensboro, Kentucky, U.S.
- Occupations: Opera singer, actress
- Years active: 1937–1949
- Spouse: Robert Smith (m. 1950; death 1959)
- Children: 1

Christine Johnson Smith (September 8, 1911 – June 9, 2010), usually credited as Christine Johnson, was an American contralto opera singer and actress who sang at the Metropolitan Opera and other opera houses. She is best known, however, for creating the role of Nettie Fowler in the original Broadway production of Carousel.

== Life and career ==
Johnson was born in Hopkinsville, Kentucky, and moved to Owensboro, Kentucky, after her freshman year of high school, graduating from Owensboro High School in 1929. She showed early promise, starring in school plays and singing in churches. After high school, she studied voice at the Nashville Conservatory of Music and sang for radio station WSM in Nashville, Tennessee.

Johnson moved to New York City in 1937 and began to work with NBC's Radio City Music Hall and Lyn Murray and the Columbia Symphony Orchestra at CBS, sometimes touring in concerts in North America. She studied voice and operatic repertoire in New York with Ernst Knoth and Sidney Dietch. In 1941, she sang Dorabella in Così fan tutte, opening the Tanglewood opera house at Lenox, Massachusetts.

In 1942, she received good notices for the role of Mrs. Page in The Merry Wives of Windsor. Other roles followed for her, with the New Opera Company of New York under Emil Cooper, at San Francisco Opera and elsewhere, in Macbeth, The Fair at Sorochyntsi, The Queen of Spades, Cavalleria rusticana, Carmen, La forza del destino, The Girl of the Golden West, the title role in Roberta, Azucena in Il trovatore and Maddalena in Rigoletto. During this period, she also sang at New York's Town Hall.

In 1943, Johnson won the Metropolitan Opera Auditions of the Air which led to her becoming the youngest person ever to sing the role of Erda in Richard Wagner's Das Rheingold at that opera house. She appeared on CBS radio's The Squibb Show twice in 1944. There she sang "It's A Lovely Day" and "My Heart's in the Highlands" with Lyn Murray and His Orchestra.

In 1945, Johnson created the role of Nettie Fowler in Carousel. Rodgers and Hammerstein wrote "You'll Never Walk Alone", which has become a standard, and "June is Busting Out All Over" especially for her. She also sang the role on the show's original cast album. Johnson stayed with the show for hundreds of performances and then toured and studied in Italy for a time. She rejoined Carousel during the national tour and continued as Nettie through its Broadway revival in 1949.

After Carousel closed, Johnson moved back to Owensboro, where she married surgeon Robert Smith in 1950 and raised two daughters, Robin and Nancy. She taught voice for many years, and one of her pupils was Florence Henderson. She also served on local arts committees and participated in some local productions. Johnson's husband died in 1959, and she later worked for Texas Gas Transmission Corporation until her retirement.

Johnson died on June 9, 2010, at the age of 98, and was buried at Rosehill Elmwood Cemetery.
