= Charles Stewart Todd =

American army officer and politician (1791–1871)

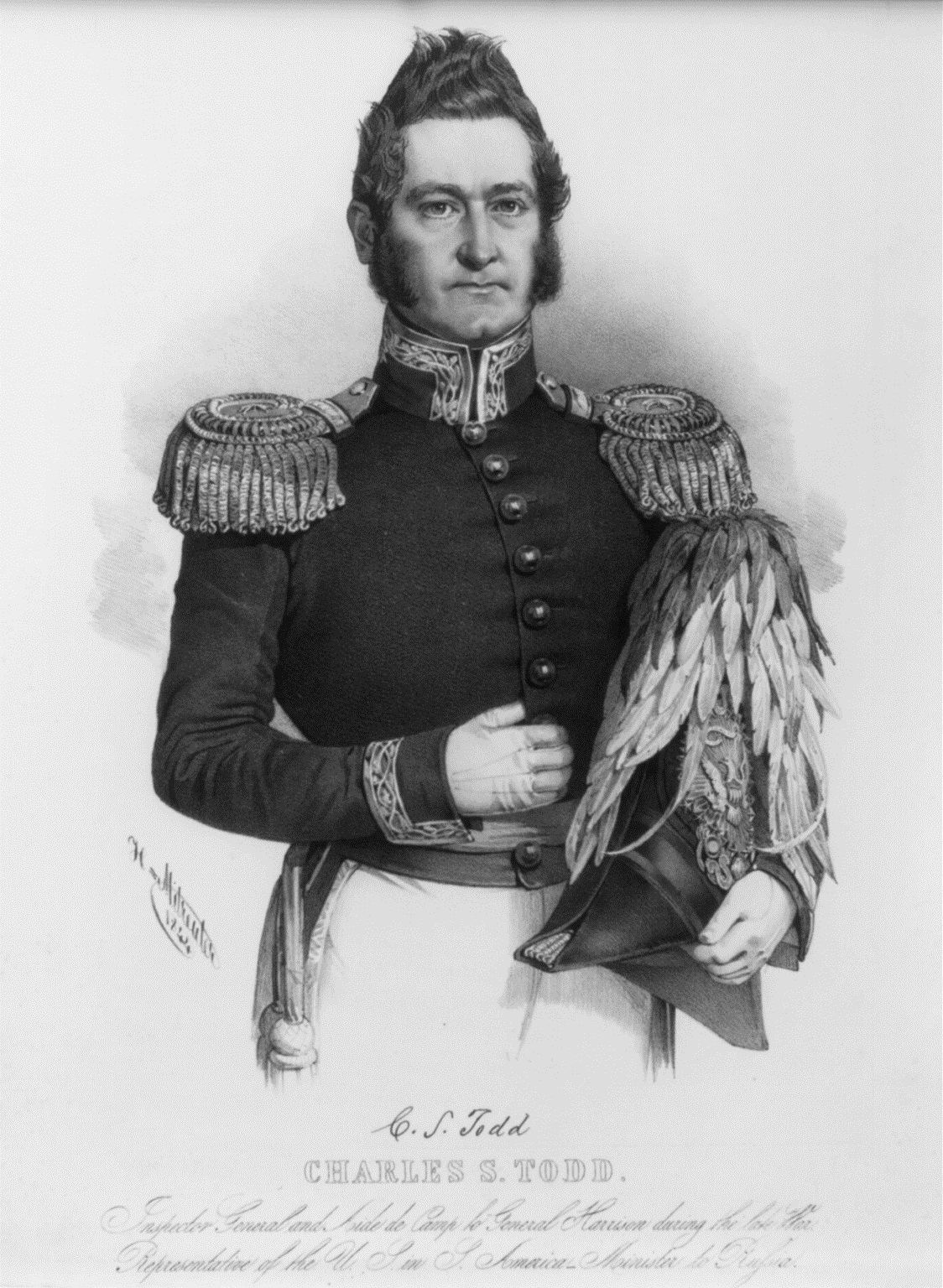

United States Ambassador to Russia
- In office November 28, 1841 – January 27, 1846
- Preceded by: Churchill C. Cambreleng
- Succeeded by: Ralph I. Ingersoll

11th Secretary of State of Kentucky
- In office 1816
- Preceded by: Martin D. Hardin
- Succeeded by: John Pope

Personal details
- Born: Charles Stewart Todd; January 22, 1791 Danville, Kentucky, U.S.
- Died: May 17, 1871 (aged 80) Baton Rouge, Louisiana, U.S.
- Resting place: Rosehill Elmwood Cemetery; Owensboro, Kentucky, U.S.
- Party: Democratic-Republican
- Spouse: Letitia Shelby
- Relations: Thomas Todd (father)
- Education: College of William and Mary; Litchfield Law School

Military service
- Allegiance: United States
- Branch/service: United States Army
- Years of service: 1812–1815
- Rank: Colonel
- Battles/wars: War of 1812; Battle of the Thames

Charles Stewart Todd (January 22, 1791 – May 17, 1871) was an American military officer, government official and United States diplomat, serving as ambassador to Russia during the mid-19th century.

== Biography ==
Todd was the son of Supreme Court Associate Justice Thomas Todd and his first wife, Elizabeth Harris. He was born near Danville, Kentucky, and continued to reside here through his childhood and adult life. Todd briefly attended Transylvania University before his transfer and graduation at the College of William and Mary in 1809. He briefly studied law with his father in Washington before attending Litchfield Law School. After his admission to the bar in 1811, he started his practice in Lexington, Kentucky.

=== War of 1812 ===
Shortly after, he volunteered in the War of 1812 where he was a subaltern and judge-advocate of General James Winchester's division in the War of 1812. In 1813, he was made a captain of infantry, and was an aide to General William Henry Harrison in the Battle of the Thames. In 1815, he became Inspector-General of the Michigan Territory under General Duncan McArthur who commissioned him with the rank of colonel. Shortly thereafter, Todd returned to Kentucky to establish a legal practice in the state capital of Frankfort where his diplomatic and political career began to expand. On June 18, 1816, he married the youngest of Governor Isaac Shelby's daughters, Letitia, with whom he had 12 children.

=== Government service ===
He served as a state representative in the years following his political establishment in Frankfort, and in 1816, he was appointed Secretary of State of Kentucky. In 1820, Todd was appointed a Confidential Agent to Gran Colombia, where he would remain until 1824. US. President James Monroe offered Todd a position to the secretaryship of the delegation to Colombia in 1823, but he declined the offer. He instead went to retire in Shelby County, Kentucky, where he worked on his farm and took up writing.

=== Later career ===
Todd came out of his retirement upon being appointed Minister to Russia. From 1841 to 1846 he served as the fifteenth United States Ambassador to Russia during the entirety of President Tyler's administration. He then went back to his retirement in 1846 and spent his time raising livestock and writing. He refused a later nomination for Governor of Kentucky, but remained politically active during Zachary Taylor's presidential campaign of 1848. He took interest in writing and in the state of Texas and its railroad system. He served as an editor of the Louisville Industrial and Commercial Gazette and the Cincinnati Republican.

=== Death and burial ===
Todd died in 1871 from pneumonia, in Baton Rouge, Louisiana at the home of his son-in-law Judge Posey. He was buried at Rosehill Elmwood Cemetery in Owensboro, Kentucky.
