= Wendell Ford =

American politician (1924–2015)

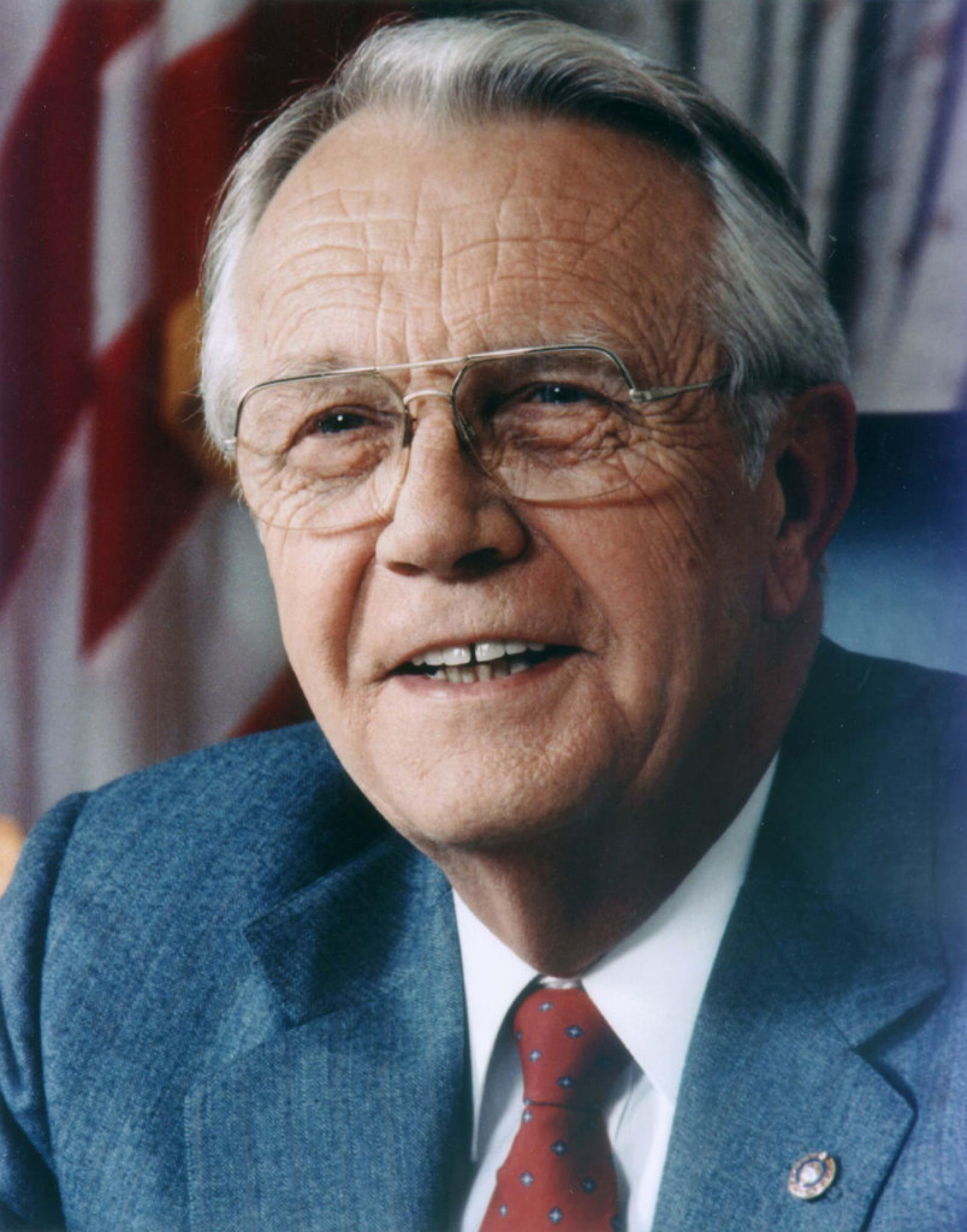
- Official portrait, c. 1990s

Senate Minority Whip
- In office January 3, 1995 – January 3, 1999
- Leader: Tom Daschle
- Preceded by: Alan Simpson
- Succeeded by: Harry Reid

Senate Majority Whip
- In office January 3, 1991 – January 3, 1995
- Leader: George J. Mitchell
- Preceded by: Alan Cranston
- Succeeded by: Trent Lott

United States Senator from Kentucky
- In office December 28, 1974 – January 3, 1999
- Preceded by: Marlow Cook
- Succeeded by: Jim Bunning

53rd Governor of Kentucky
- In office December 7, 1971 – December 28, 1974
- Lieutenant: Julian Carroll
- Preceded by: Louie Nunn
- Succeeded by: Julian Carroll

45th Lieutenant Governor of Kentucky
- In office December 12, 1967 – December 7, 1971
- Governor: Louie Nunn
- Preceded by: Harry Lee Waterfield
- Succeeded by: Julian Carroll

Member of the Kentucky Senate from the 8th district
- In office January 1, 1966 – December 12, 1967
- Preceded by: Casper Gardner
- Succeeded by: Delbert Murphy

Personal details
- Born: Wendell Hampton Ford; September 8, 1924 Daviess County, Kentucky, U.S.
- Died: January 22, 2015 (aged 90) Owensboro, Kentucky, U.S.
- Resting place: Rosehill Elmwood Cemetery
- Party: Democratic
- Spouse: Ruby Jean Neel (m. 1943)
- Children: 2
- Education: University of Kentucky; Maryland School of Insurance

Military service
- Allegiance: United States
- Branch/service: United States Army
- Years of service: 1944–1946; 1949–1962
- Rank: First Lieutenant
- Unit: Kentucky Army National Guard
- Battles/wars: World War II; Korean War
- Awards: Expert Infantryman Badge; American Campaign Medal; Good Conduct Medal; World War II Victory Medal
- Wendell Ford's voice Ford explains his vote against NAFTA; Recorded November 20, 1993

Wendell Hampton Ford (September 8, 1924 – January 22, 2015) was an American politician from Kentucky. A member of the Democratic Party, he served as the 53rd governor of Kentucky from 1971 to 1974, and as a member of the United States Senate from 1974 to 1999. He was the first person to be successively elected lieutenant governor of Kentucky, governor, and United States Senate member in Kentucky history. He was the Senate Democratic whip from 1991 to 1999, and was considered the leader of the state's Democratic Party from his election as governor in 1971 until he retired from the Senate in 1999. At the time of his retirement he was the longest-serving senator in Kentucky's history, a mark which was then surpassed by Mitch McConnell, in 2009. Ford is the last Democrat to have served as a U.S. Senate member from the state of Kentucky.

Born in Daviess County, Kentucky, Ford attended the University of Kentucky, but his studies were interrupted by his service in World War II. After the war, he graduated from the Maryland School of Insurance and returned to Kentucky to help his father with the family insurance business. He also continued his military service in the Kentucky Army National Guard. He worked on the gubernatorial campaign of Bert Combs in 1959 and became Combs's executive assistant when Combs was elected governor. Encouraged to run for the Kentucky Senate by Combs's ally and successor, Ned Breathitt, Ford won the seat and served one four-year term before running for lieutenant governor in 1967. He was elected on a split ticket with Republican Louie Nunn. Four years later, Ford defeated Combs in an upset in the Democratic primary election en route to the governorship.

As governor, Ford made the government more efficient by reorganizing and consolidating some departments in the executive branch. He raised revenue for the state through a severance tax on coal and enacted reforms to the educational system. He purged most of the Republicans from statewide office, including helping Walter Dee Huddleston win the Senate seat vacated by the retirement of Republican stalwart John Sherman Cooper. In 1974, Ford himself ousted the other incumbent senator, Republican Marlow Cook. Following the rapid rise of Ford and many of his political allies, he and his lieutenant governor, Julian Carroll, were investigated on charges of political corruption, but a grand jury refused to indict them. As a senator, Ford was a staunch defender of Kentucky's tobacco industry. He also formed the Senate National Guard Caucus with Republican U.S. Senator Kit Bond from Missouri. Chosen as Democratic party whip in 1991, Ford considered running for floor leader in 1994 before throwing his support to U.S. Senate member Chris Dodd of Connecticut. He retired from the Senate in 1999 and returned to Owensboro, where he taught politics to youth at the Owensboro Museum of Science and History.

== Early life ==
Wendell Ford was born near Owensboro, in Daviess County, Kentucky, on September 8, 1924. He was the son of Ernest M. and Irene Woolfork (Schenk) Ford. His father was a member of the Kentucky Senate and ally of Governor of Kentucky Earle Clements. Ford obtained his early education in the public schools of Daviess County and graduated from Daviess County High School. From 1942 to 1943, he attended the University of Kentucky.

On September 18, 1943, Ford married Ruby Jean Neel (born 1924) of Owensboro at the home of the bride's parents. The couple had two children. Daughter Shirley (Ford) Dexter was born in 1950 and son Steven Ford was born in 1954. The family attended First Baptist Church in Owensboro.

In 1944, Ford left the University of Kentucky to join the United States Army, enlisting for service in World War II on July 22, 1944. He was trained as an administrative non-commissioned officer and promoted to the rank of technical sergeant on November 17, 1945. Over the course of his service, he received the American Campaign Medal and the World War II Victory Medal and earned the Expert Infantryman Badge and Good Conduct Medal. He was honorably discharged on June 18, 1946.

Following the war, Ford returned home to work with his father in the family insurance business, and graduated from the Maryland School of Insurance in 1947. On June 7, 1949, he enlisted in the Kentucky Army National Guard and was assigned to Company I of the 149th Infantry Regimental Combat Team in Owensboro. On August 7, 1949, he was promoted to Second lieutenant of Infantry. In 1949, Ford's company was converted from infantry to tanks, and Ford served as a Company Commander in the 240th Tank Battalion. Promoted to First lieutenant of Armor, he transferred to the inactive Guard in 1956, before being discharged in 1962.

== Political career ==
Ford was very active in civic affairs, becoming the first Kentuckian to serve as president of the Junior Chamber International in 1954. He was a youth chairman of Bert Combs' 1959 gubernatorial campaign. After Combs's election, Ford served as Combs's executive assistant from 1959 to 1963. When his mother died in 1963, Ford returned to Owensboro to help his father with the family insurance agency. Although it was speculated he would run for lieutenant governor that year, Ford later insisted he had decided not to re-enter politics until Governor Ned Breathitt asked him to run against Casper "Cap" Gardner, the state senate's majority leader and a major obstacle to Breathitt's progressive legislative agenda. Ford won the 1965 election by only 305 votes but quickly became a key player in the state senate. Representing the Eighth District, including Daviess and Hancock counties, Ford introduced 22 major pieces of legislation that became law during his single term in the senate.

In 1967, Ford ran for Lieutenant Governor of Kentucky, this time against the wishes of Breathitt and Combs, whose pick was Robert F. Matthews Jr., who was Attorney General of Kentucky. Ford defeated Matthews by 631 votes, 0.2% of the total vote count in the primary. He ran an independent campaign and won in the general election even as Combs-Breathitt pick Henry Ward lost the race for governor to Republican Louie Nunn. Republicans and Democrats split the state offices, with five going to Republicans and four going to Democrats.

During his time as lieutenant governor, Ford rebuilt the state's Democratic political machine, which would help elect him and others, including U.S. Senate member Walter Dee Huddleston and Governor of Kentucky Martha Layne Collins. When Governor of Kentucky Louie Nunn asked the legislature to increase the state sales tax in 1968 from 3 percent to 5 percent, Ford opposed the measure, saying it should only pass if food and medicine were exempted. Ford lost this battle; the increase passed without exemptions. From 1970 to 1971, Ford was a member of the executive committee of the National Conference of Lieutenant Governors. While lieutenant governor, he became an honorary member of Lambda Chi Alpha fraternity in 1969.

=== Governor of Kentucky ===
At the expiration of his term as lieutenant governor, Ford was one of eight candidates to enter the 1971 Democratic gubernatorial primary. The favorite of the field was Ford's mentor, Combs. During the campaign, Ford attacked Combs on the grounds of age and the sales tax enacted during Combs's administration. He also questioned why Combs would leave his better-paying federal judgeship to run for a second term as governor. Ford garnered more votes than Combs and the other six candidates combined, and attributed his unlikely win over Combs in the primary to superior strategy and Combs's underestimation of his candidacy. Following the election, Combs correctly predicted "This is the end of the road for me politically."

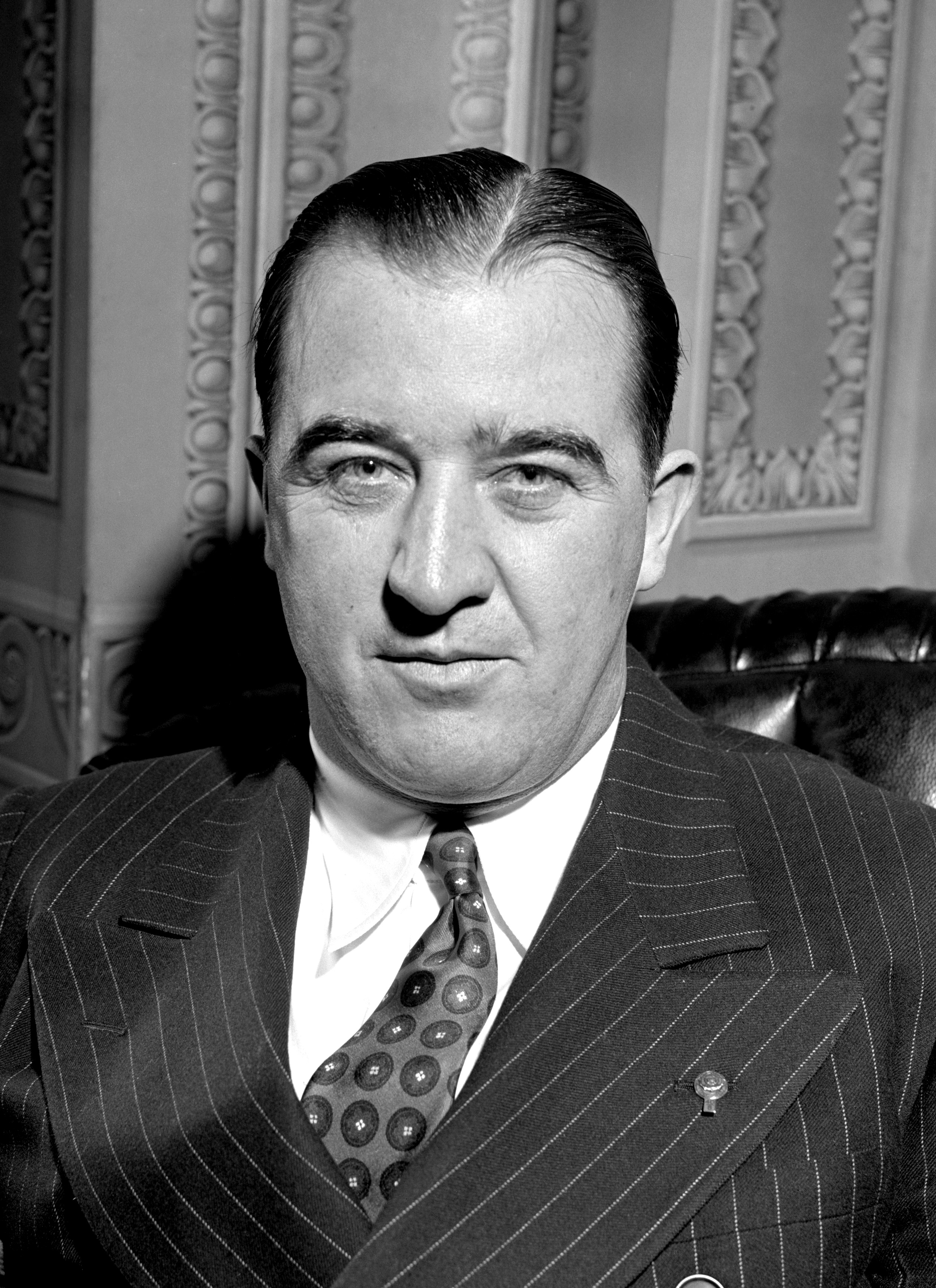
Former governor Happy Chandler ran against Ford in the 1971 gubernatorial election.

Ford went on to win the governorship in a four-way general election that included another former Democratic governor, Happy Chandler, who ran as an independent. Ford finished more than 58,000 votes ahead of his closest rival, Republican Tom Emberton. With Combs and Chandler both out of politics, factionalism in the Kentucky Democratic Party began to wane.

As governor, Ford raised revenue from a severance tax on coal, a two-cent-per-gallon tax on gasoline, and an increased corporate tax. He balanced these increases by exempting food from the state sales tax. The resulting large budget surplus allowed him to propose several construction projects. His victory in the primary had been largely due to Jefferson County, Kentucky, and he returned the favor by approving funds to build the Kentucky International Convention Center and expand the Kentucky Exposition Center. He also shepherded a package of reforms to the state's criminal justice system through the first legislative session of his term.

Ford oversaw the transition of the University of Louisville from municipal to state funding. He pushed for reforms to the state's education system, giving up his own chairmanship of the University of Kentucky board of trustees and extending voting rights to student and faculty members of university boards. These changes generally shifted administration positions in the state's colleges from political rewards to professional appointments. He increased funding to the state's education budget and gave expanded powers to the Kentucky Council on Postsecondary Education. He vetoed a measure that would have allowed collective bargaining for teachers.

Ford drew praise for his attention to the mundane task of improving the efficiency and organization of executive departments, creating several "super cabinets" under which many departments were consolidated. During the 1972 legislative session, he created the Department of Finance and Administration, combining the functions of the Kentucky Program Development Office and the Department of Finance. Constitutional limits sometimes prevented him from combining like functions, but Ford made the reorganization a top priority and realized some savings to the state.

On March 21, 1972, the Supreme Court of the United States handed down its ruling in the case of Dunn v. Blumstein that found that a citizen who had lived in a state for 30 days was resident in that state and thus eligible to vote there. Kentucky's Constitution required residency of one year in the state, six months in the county and sixty days in the precinct to establish voting eligibility. This issue had to be resolved before the 1972 presidential election in November, so Ford called a special legislative session to enact the necessary corrections. In addition, Ford added to the General Assembly's agenda the creation of a state environmental protection agency, a refinement of congressional districts in line with the latest census figures and ratification of the recently passed Equal Rights Amendment. All of these measures passed.

Despite surgery for a brain aneurysm in June 1972, Ford attended the 1972 Democratic National Convention in Miami Beach, Florida. He supported Edmund Muskie for president, but later greeted nominee George McGovern when he visited Kentucky. The convention was the beginning of Ford's role in national politics. Offended by the McGovern campaign's treatment of Democratic finance chairman Robert S. Strauss, he helped Strauss get elected chairman of the Democratic National Committee following McGovern's defeat. As a result of his involvement in Strauss's election, Ford was elected chair of the Democratic Governors' Conference from 1973 to 1974. He also served as vice-chair of the Conference's Natural Resources and Environmental Management Committee.

During the 1974 legislative session, Ford proposed a six-year study of coal liquefaction and gasification in response to the 1973 oil crisis. He also increased funding to human resources and continued his reorganization of the executive branch, creating cabinets for transportation, development, education and the arts, human resources, consumer protection and regulation, safety and justice. He was considered less ruthless than previous governors in firing state officials hired by the previous administration, and expanded the state merit system to cover some previously exempt state workers. Despite the expansion, he was criticized for the replacements he made, particularly that of the state personnel commissioner appointed during the Nunn administration. Critics also cited the fact that employees found qualified by the merit examination were still required to obtain political clearance before they were hired.

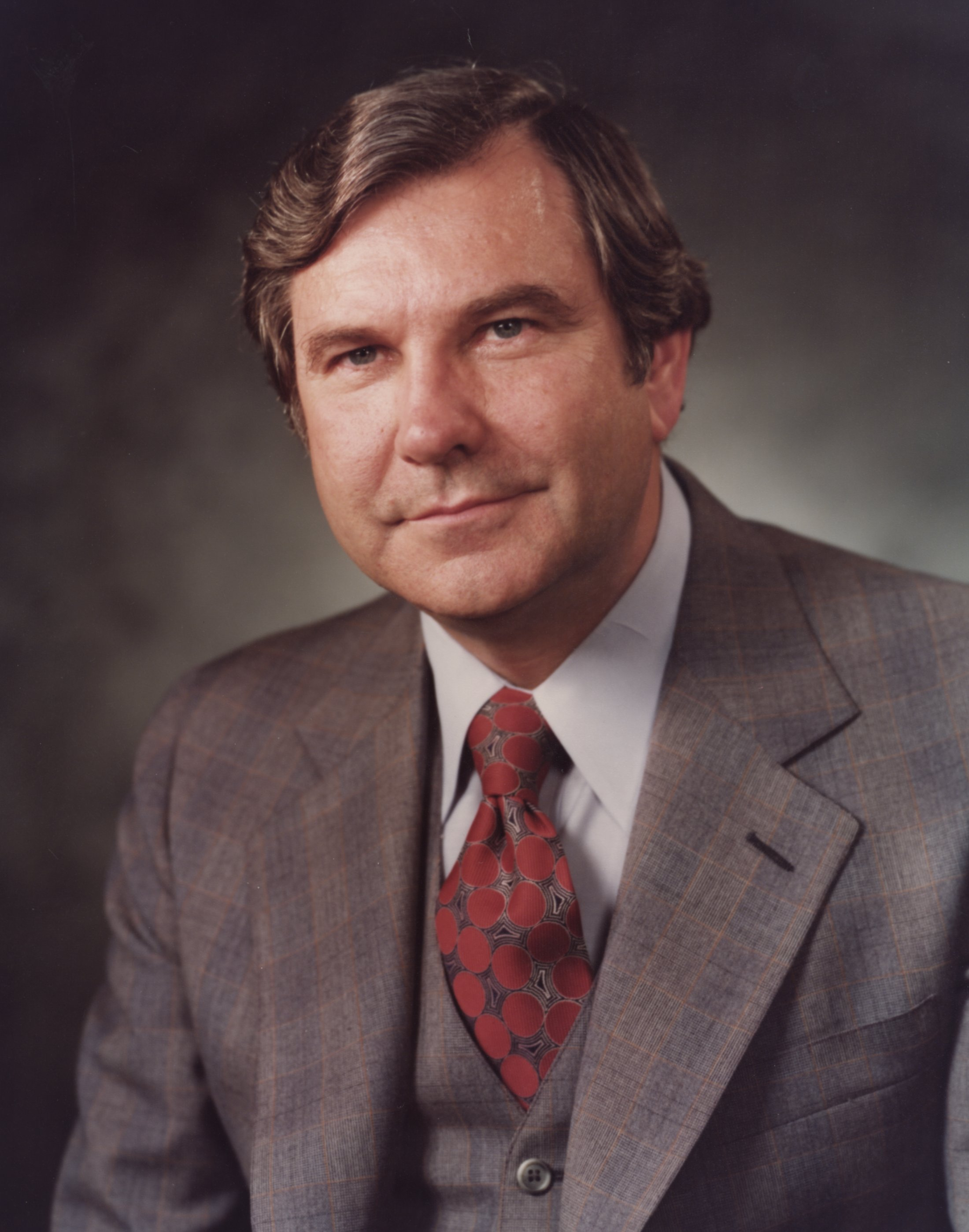
Walter Dee Huddleston, Ford's campaign manager, was elected to the United States Senate in 1972.

=== 1974 Campaign for the Senate ===
Ford united the state's Democratic Party, allowing them to capture a seat in the U.S. Senate in 1972 for the first time since 1956. The seat was vacated by the retirement of Republican John Sherman Cooper and won by Ford's campaign manager, Dee Huddleston. Ford's friends then began lobbying him to try and unseat Kentucky's other Republican U.S. Senate member, one-term legislator Marlow Cook. Ford wanted lieutenant governor Julian Carroll, who had run on an informal slate with Combs in the 1971 primary, to run for Cook's seat, but Carroll already had his eye on the governor's chair. Ford's allies did not have a gubernatorial candidate stronger than Carroll, and when a poll showed that Ford was the only Democrat who could defeat Cook, he agreed to run, announcing his candidacy immediately following the 1974 legislative session.

A primary issue during the election was the construction of a dam on the Red River. Cook opposed the dam, but Ford supported it and allocated some of the state's budget surplus to its construction. In the election, Ford defeated Cook by a vote of 399,406 to 328,982, completing his revitalization of the state's Democratic party by personally ousting the last Republican from major office. Cook resigned his seat in December so that Ford would have a higher standing in seniority in the Senate. Ford resigned as governor to accept the seat, leaving the governorship to Carroll, who dropped state support for the project, killing it.

In the wake of the rapid ascent of Ford and members of his faction to the state's major political offices, he and Carroll were investigated in a corruption probe. The four-year investigation began in 1977 and focused on a state insurance kickback scheme alleged to have operated during Ford's tenure. In June 1972, Ford had purchased insurance policies for state workers from some of his political backers without procurement. State law did not require competitive bidding, and earlier governors had engaged in similar practices. Investigators believed there was an arrangement in which insurance companies getting government contracts split commissions with party officials, although Ford was suspected of allowing the practice for political benefit rather than personal financial gain. In 1981, prosecutors asked for indictments against Ford and Carroll on racketeering charges, but a grand jury refused. Because grand jury proceedings are secret, what exactly occurred has never been publicly revealed. However, state Republicans maintained that Ford took the Fifth Amendment to the United States Constitution while on the stand, invoking his right against self-incrimination. Ford refused to confirm or deny this report. A federal grand jury recommended that Ford be indicted in connection with the insurance scheme, but the U.S. Department of Justice did not act on this recommendation.

=== United States Senator ===
Ford entered the Senate in 1974 and was reelected in 1980, 1986, and 1992. In the 1980 primary, Ford received only token opposition from attorney Flora Stuart. He was unopposed in the 1986 and 1992 Democratic primaries. Republicans failed to put forward a viable challenger during any of Ford's re-election bids. In 1980, he defeated septuagenarian former state auditor Mary Louise Foust by 334,862 votes. Ford's 720,891 votes represented 65 percent of the total votes cast in the election, a record for a statewide race in Kentucky. Against Republican Jackson Andrews IV in 1986, Ford shattered that record, securing 74 percent of the votes cast and carrying all 120 counties of Kentucky. Kentucky State Senate member David L. Williams fared little better in 1992, surrendering 477,002 votes to Ford (63 percent).

Ford seriously considered leaving the Senate and running for governor again in 1983 and 1991, but decided against it both times. In the 1983 contest, he would have faced sitting lieutenant governor Martha Layne Collins in the primary. Collins was a factional ally of Ford's, which influenced his decision. In 1991, Ford cited his seniority in the Senate and desire to become Democratic Whip of the United States Senate as factors in his decision not to run for governor.

Early in his career, Ford supported a constitutional amendment against desegregation busing. He also floated a proposal to put the federal budget on a two-year cycle, believing too much time was spent annually on budget wrangling. This idea, based on the model used in the Kentucky state budget, was never implemented. During the 95th Congress (1977–1979), he was chairman of the Senate Committee on Aeronautical and Space Sciences.

From 1977 to 1983, Ford was a member of the Democratic Senatorial Campaign Committee. He first sought the post of Democratic whip in 1988, but lost to U.S. Senate member Alan Cranston from California, who had held the post since 1977. Ford got a late start in the race, and a New York Times writer opined that he overestimated his chances of unseating Cranston. Immediately after conceding his loss, he announced he would be a candidate for the position in the next election in 1990. He again faced Cranston in the election, but Cranston withdrew from the race due to a battle with prostate cancer. Ford maintained that he had enough commitments of support in the Democratic caucus to have won without Cranston's withdrawal. When majority leader George J. Mitchell retired from the Senate in 1994, Ford showed some interest in the Democratic floor leader post. Ultimately, he decided against it, choosing to focus instead on Kentucky issues. He supported U.S. Senator Chris Dodd from Connecticut for majority leader.

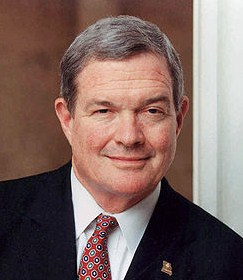
Kit Bond and Ford formed the Senate National Guard Caucus in 1989.

During the 98th Congress (1983–1985), Ford served on the Select Committee to Study the Committee System, and he was a member of the Senate Committee on Rules and Administration in the 100th through 103rd Congresses (1987–1995). In 1989, he joined with U.S. Senator Kit Bond from Missouri to form the Senate National Guard Caucus, a coalition of senators committed to advancing National Guard capabilities and readiness. Ford said he was motivated to form the caucus after seeing the work done by Mississippi congressman Sonny Montgomery with the National Guard Association of the United States and the National Guard Bureau. Ford co-chaired the caucus with Bond until Ford's retirement from the Senate in 1999. The Kentucky Army Guard dedicated the Wendell H. Ford Training Center in Muhlenberg County, Kentucky in 1998. In 1999, the National Guard Bureau presented Ford with the Sonny Montgomery Award, its highest honor.

U.S. Senator Thomas Eagleton from Missouri opined that Ford and Dee Huddleston made "probably the best one-two combination for any state in the Senate." Both were defenders of tobacco, Kentucky's primary cash crop. Ford sat on the Senate Committee on Commerce, Science, and Transportation, influencing legislation affecting the manufacturing end of the tobacco industry, while Huddleston sat on the Senate Committee on Agriculture, Nutrition, and Forestry and protected programs that benefited tobacco farmers. Both were instrumental in salvaging the Tobacco Price Support Program. Ford got tobacco exempted from the Consumer Product Safety Act and was a consistent opponent of the increases of cigarette taxes in the United States. He sponsored an amendment to the General Agreement on Tariffs and Trade that limited the amount of foreign tobacco that could be imported by the United States.

Later in his career, Ford split with Huddleston's successor, Mitch McConnell, over a proposed settlements of lawsuits against the Tobacco Master Settlement Agreement. Ford favored the package as presented to Congress, which would have protected the price support program, while McConnell favored a smaller aid package to tobacco farmers and an end to the price support program. Both proposals were ultimately defeated, and the rift between Ford and McConnell never healed.

As chairman of the Commerce Committee's aviation subcommittee, Ford secured funds to improve the airports in Louisville, Kentucky, Northern Kentucky, and Glasgow, Kentucky. The Wendell H. Ford Airport in the town of Hazard, Kentucky is named for him. A 1990 bill aimed at reducing aircraft noise contained in the Federal Aviation Act of 1958, improving airline safety measures, and requiring airlines to better inform consumers about their performance was dubbed the Wendell H. Ford Aviation Investment and Reform Act for the 21st Century.

Of his career in the Senate, Ford said "I wasn't interested in national issues. I was interested in Kentucky issues." Nevertheless, he influenced several important pieces of federal legislation. He sponsored an amendment to the Family Medical Leave Act of 1993 exempting businesses with fewer than fifty employees. He was a key player in securing passage of the National Voter Registration Act of 1993. He supported increases to the federal minimum wage and the Personal Responsibility and Work Opportunity Act. A supporter of research into clean coal technology, he also worked with U.S. Senator Jay Rockefeller from West Virginia to secure better retirement benefits for coal miners. Never known as a major player on international issues, Ford favored continued economic sanctions against Iraq as an alternative to the Gulf War. He voted against the Panama Canal Treaty, which he perceived to be unpopular with Kentucky voters. Despite having chaired Bill Clinton's United States Joint Congressional Committee on Inaugural Ceremonies in 1993, Ford broke with the administration by voting against the North American Free Trade Agreement .

As he had as governor of Kentucky, Ford gave attention to improving the efficiency of government. While serving on the United States Congressional Joint Committee on Printing during the 101st and 103rd Congresses, he saved the government millions of dollars in printing costs by printing in volume and using recycled paper. In 1998, Republican U.S. Senator John Warner from Virginia sponsored the Wendell H. Ford Government Publications Reform Act of 1998; Ford signed on as a co-sponsor. The bill would have eliminated the United States Congressional Joint Committee on Printing, distributing its authority and functions among the Senate Rules Committee, the United States House Committee on Oversight and Government Reform, and the administrator of the United States Government Printing Office. It would also have centralized government printing services and penalized government agencies who did not make their documents available to the printing office to be printed. Opponents of the bill cited the broad powers granted to the printing office and concerns about the erosion of copyright protection. The bill was reported favorably out of committee, but was squeezed from the legislative calendar by issues related to the impending impeachment of Bill Clinton. Warner did not return to his chairmanship of the Joint Committee on Printing in the next congress, Ford retired from the Senate, and the bill was not re-introduced.

== Later life, illness and death ==
Ford chose not to seek a fifth term in 1998, and retired to Owensboro. In 1998 he was awarded American Library Association Honorary Membership. He worked for a time as a consultant to Washington lobbying and law firm Dickstein Shapiro. At the time of his retirement, Ford was the longest-serving U.S. Senate member in Kentucky history. In January 2009, Mitch McConnell surpassed Ford's mark of 24 years in the Senate.

In August 1978, the U.S. Route 60 bypass around Owensboro was renamed the Wendell H. Ford Expressway. The Western Kentucky Parkway was also renamed the Wendell H. Ford Western Kentucky Parkway during the administration of Governor Paul E. Patton. In 2009, Ford was inducted into the Kentucky Transportation Hall of Fame.

Later in life, Ford taught politics to the youth of Owensboro from the Owensboro Museum of Science and History, which houses a replica of his U.S. Senate office.

On July 19, 2014, the Messenger-Inquirer reported that Ford had been diagnosed with lung cancer. Ford died from lung cancer at his home on January 22, 2015, at age 90. He was interred at Rosehill Elmwood Cemetery.

== See also ==
- Conservative Democrat

Non-profit organization positions
Preceded by Hugh McKenna	President of the United States Junior Chamber; 1956–1957	Succeeded by Chuck Shearer
Party political offices
Preceded by Harry Waterfield	Democratic nominee for Lieutenant Governor of Kentucky; 1967	Succeeded by Julian Carroll
Preceded by Henry Ward	Democratic nominee for Governor of Kentucky; 1971	Succeeded by Julian Carroll
Preceded by Dale Bumpers	Chair of the Democratic Governors Association; 1973–1974	Succeeded by Wendell Anderson
Preceded by Katherine Peden	Democratic nominee for U.S. Senator from Kentucky (Class 3); 1974, 1980, 1986, 1992	Succeeded by Scotty Baesler
Preceded by Bennett Johnston	Chair of the Democratic Senatorial Campaign Committee; 1977–1983	Succeeded by Lloyd Bentsen
Preceded by Alan Cranston	Senate Democratic Whip; 1991–1999	Succeeded by Harry Reid
Political offices
Preceded by Harry Waterfield	Lieutenant Governor of Kentucky; 1967–1971	Succeeded by Julian Carroll
Preceded by Louie Nunn	Governor of Kentucky; 1971–1974	Succeeded by Julian Carroll
U.S. Senate
Preceded by Marlow Cook	United States Senator (Class 3) from Kentucky; 1974–1999; Served alongside: Walter Dee Huddleston, Mitch McConnell	Succeeded by Jim Bunning
Preceded by Frank Moss	Chair of the Senate Space Committee; 1977	Position abolished
Preceded by Charles Mathias	Chair of the Senate Rules Committee; 1987–1995	Succeeded by Ted Stevens
Preceded by Howard Baker	Chair of the Joint Inaugural Committee; 1988–1993	Succeeded by John Warner
Preceded by Alan Cranston	Senate Majority Whip; 1991–1995	Succeeded by Trent Lott
Preceded by Alan Simpson	Senate Minority Whip; 1995–1999	Succeeded by Harry Reid
