= Rosehill Elmwood Cemetery =

Cemetery in Owensboro, Daviess County, Kentucky

Coordinates: 37°45′16″N 87°05′49″W

- Interactive map of Rosehill Elmwood Cemetery

Details
- Location: 1300 Old Hartford Road, Owensboro, Kentucky
- No. of interments: Estimated 55,000

Rosehill Elmwood Cemetery is located at 1300 Old Hartford Road in Owensboro, Daviess County, Kentucky. There are about 55,000 interments at the cemetery, which is officially recognized as a historical landmark by the state of Kentucky. Notable people buried in the cemetery include a number of US Congressmen, as well as Rainey Bethea, the last person to be publicly executed in the United States.

== Notable persons ==
- Rainey Bethea
- Anna B. Harrison Connor
- William Thomas Ellis
- Wendell Hampton Ford
- Christine Johnson
- James Leeper Johnson
- Thomas Clay McCreery
- John Hardin McHenry Sr
- Johnny Morrison
- William Northcut Sweeney
- Philip Thompson
- Charles Stewart Todd
- George Washington Triplett (1809–1894), member of the Kentucky House of Representatives, Kentucky Senate and Confederate States Congress
- Philip Triplett
