= Marlow Cook =

American politician (1926–2016)

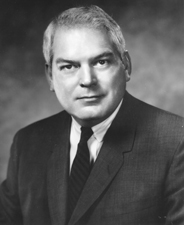

United States Senator from Kentucky
- In office December 17, 1968 – December 27, 1974
- Preceded by: Thruston Ballard Morton
- Succeeded by: Wendell Ford

County Judge of Jefferson County
- In office January 1, 1962 – December 16, 1968
- Preceded by: B. C. Van Arsdale
- Succeeded by: E. P. Sawyer

Member of the Kentucky House of Representatives from the 34th district
- In office January 1, 1958 – January 1, 1962
- Preceded by: Henry R. Heyburn
- Succeeded by: Charles E. Gaines

Personal details
- Born: Marlow Webster Cook; July 27, 1926 Akron, New York, U.S.
- Died: February 4, 2016 (aged 89) Sarasota, Florida, U.S.
- Party: Republican
- Spouse: Nancy Remmers (m. 1947)
- Children: 5
- Education: University of Louisville (BA, LLB)

Military service
- Allegiance: United States
- Branch/service: United States Navy
- Battles/wars: World War II

Marlow Webster Cook (July 27, 1926 – February 4, 2016) was an American politician from Kentucky who served as a member of the United States Senate from his appointment in December 1968 to his resignation in December 1974. He was a Rockefeller Republican.

He also ran the lobbying firm Cook and Henderson with former Democratic Party United States House of Representatives member David N. Henderson from North Carolina, and the two were the primary political lobbyists for the Tobacco Institute in the early 1980s.

== Early life ==
Cook was born in Akron, New York, a town in Erie County, New York. He moved to Louisville, Kentucky at 17. Also at that age, he joined the United States Navy and served on submarines in both the European Theater of Operations, United States Army and Theaters of Operations in the Pacific War during World War II. After the war, he enrolled at the University of Louisville and earned a Bachelor of Arts degree in 1948 and a law degree in 1950. He practiced law in Louisville until 1957.

== Political career ==
=== Kentucky House of Representatives ===
Cook was elected to the Kentucky House of Representatives in 1957 and again in 1959. He served on a special committee analyzing education in the state and also on a planning committee.

Cook was elected to two terms as Jefferson County Judge, the equivalent of a mayor or county executive position administering populous Jefferson County, which, by the 1960s, was mostly suburbs of Louisville. He was elected in 1961 and, along with fellow Republican William Cowger, who became the new mayor of Louisville, Cook unseated the Democratic Party, which had held both offices for 28 years.

In 1962, Cook was primarily responsible for the county's $34,000 purchase of the decrepit steamboat Avalon at government auction in Cincinnati. Auctioned as little more than scrap material, upon refurbishment the boat was now called the Belle of Louisville, and, as of 2025, it still carried passengers yearly and was one of the most recognizable symbols of the city. At the time, Interstate 64 was being constructed along the city's waterfront, and Cook's purchase of the steamboat was intended as a measure to bring attention to the city's historic cobblestone wharf.

A politically motivated taxpayer suit was brought by local lawyer Daniel Boone because of the county's expenditure of such an "outrageous sum" for a dilapidated "throwback to the Dark Ages of transportation," in Alan Bates' memorable phrase. According to Cook, the expenditure worked out to roughly six cents per taxpayer, a negligible sum, even at that time, and when individual citizens complained, he would simply pay them off with pennies from a jar that he kept in his office desk for the purpose. In a 1989 interview, Cook said that some people insisted on checks, and he wrote several such six-cent checks, but none of them was ever cashed.

Cook was reelected county judge in 1965 by a wide margin, 121,481 votes to Democrat William B. Stansbury's 71,280.

In 1967, Cook ran at the top of a slate of statewide office holders as a candidate for governor of Kentucky in the Republican primary election. He was narrowly defeated by more conservative Barren County, Kentucky Judge Louie Nunn, who went on to be elected the first Republican governor in Kentucky since 1943. Nunn had also been the party's unsuccessful gubernatorial candidate in 1963 but had narrowly lost to Democrat Ned Breathitt. At the time, Kentucky governors could not succeed themselves in office.

=== United States Senator ===
In 1968, Cook ran for the U.S. Senate to fill the vacancy created by the retirement of another moderate Republican, Thruston Ballard Morton, a former chairman of the Republican National Committee. In the general election in which Richard Nixon carried Kentucky over Hubert Humphrey and George Wallace, Cook defeated former state Commerce Commissioner Katherine Peden. He was the first Roman Catholic to hold statewide office in Kentucky. He was subsequently one of the first Republican U.S. Senate members to call for Nixon to resign during the Watergate scandal.

Cook was defeated in his 1974 bid for re-election by Governor Wendell Ford, a popular Democrat. Cook's repeated plea that Ford debate him was seen as highly unusual. Following the election, Cook resigned his seat early, in December, so that Ford could resign and be appointed senator by his successor, Julian Carroll, thus having greater seniority in assuming the office. (Morton had done the same for Cook, in 1968.)

== Later career ==
Following his political career, Cook practiced law in Washington, D.C. until 1989, when he retired to Sarasota, Florida. In a fiery op-ed, he announced his support for Democratic Party U.S. Senate member John Kerry from Massachusetts in the 2004 United States presidential election: "I have been, and will continue to be, a Republican. But when we as a party send the wrong person to the White House George W. Bush, then it is our responsibility to send him home if our nation suffers as a result of his actions."

Some of his former aides went on to congressional careers. Mitch McConnell, later the Senate Minority Leader, was Cook's chief legislative aide from 1968 to 1970, and John Yarmuth, then-chair of the United States House Committee on the Budget, was an aide to Cook in the 1970s, later becoming a Democrat before running for office.

Cook, however, opposed McConnell in the 1984 campaign. McConnell defeated the incumbent Democratic senator, Walter Dee Huddleston.

In later years, Cook was uncertain about what he considered McConnell's turn to the right. McConnell had helped Cook to advance the unsuccessful Equal Rights Amendment, but Cook opposed his former aide on several other pieces of legislation, particularly his opposition to the Affordable Care Act.

Cook died on February 4, 2016, in Sarasota, Florida from complications from a heart attack, at age 89.

Party political offices
Preceded by Thruston Morton	Republican nominee for U.S. Senator from Kentucky (Class 3); 1968, 1974	Succeeded by Mary Louise Foust
U.S. Senate
Preceded by Thruston Morton	United States Senator (Class 3) from Kentucky; 1968–1974; Served alongside: John Sherman Cooper, Walter Dee Huddleston	Succeeded by Wendell Ford
Preceded by Ted Stevens	Ranking Member of the Senate Rules Committee; 1972–1974	Succeeded by Mark Hatfield
