= Henry H. Carter (politician) =

American politician (1903–1970)

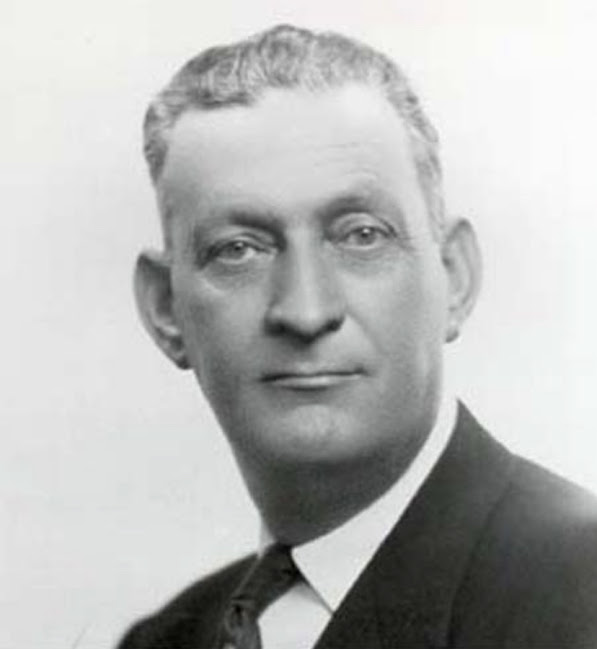

36th Kentucky Auditor of Public Accounts
- In office January 6, 1964 – January 1, 1968
- Governor: Ned Breathitt; Louie Nunn
- Preceded by: Joseph Schneider
- Succeeded by: Clyde Conley

71st Secretary of State of Kentucky
- In office January 4, 1960 – January 6, 1964
- Governor: Bert T. Combs; Ned Breathitt
- Preceded by: Thelma Stovall
- Succeeded by: Thelma Stovall

28th Kentucky State Treasurer
- In office January 2, 1956 – January 4, 1960
- Governor: Happy Chandler; Bert T. Combs
- Preceded by: Pearl Frances Runyon
- Succeeded by: Thelma Stovall

Kentucky State Banking Commissioner
- In office 1947–1955
- Governor: Earle Clements; Lawrence Wetherby

Personal details
- Born: August 30, 1903 West Liberty, Kentucky, U.S.
- Died: June 24, 1970 (aged 66) Lexington, Kentucky, U.S.
- Party: Democratic
- Spouse: Mary Alma Jones (m. 1931)
- Children: 2
- Parent(s): James William Carter; Alice Wells Carter
- Education: Bowling Green Business University

Henry Howes Carter (August 30, 1903 – June 24, 1970) was an American politician who served as Kentucky State Treasurer from 1956 to 1960, Secretary of State of Kentucky from 1960 to 1964, and Kentucky Auditor of Public Accounts from 1964 to 1968. He was a member of the Democratic Party.

== Early life ==
Henry Howes Carter was born on August 30, 1903, in West Liberty, Kentucky, as the only child of James William "Will" and Alice (Wells) Carter. He graduated from Morgan County High School and attended Bowling Green Business University in Bowling Green. He married Mary Alma Jones on June 14, 1931, of this union was born two children, John Scott and Alice Ann Carter.

== Career ==
From 1920 to 1933, Carter was assistant cashier at a commercial bank in West Liberty. While working as assistant cashier, his mentor was former state senator Cortis K. Stacy, president of the bank and uncle by marriage. From 1934 to 1941, he was an examiner with the Federal Deposit Insurance Corporation. From 1947 to 1955, he served as Kentucky State Banking Commissioner under governors Earle Clements and Lawrence Wetherby.

In 1955, Carter ran for Kentucky State Treasurer, he was on the Bert Combs slate in the Democratic primary. However, Happy Chandler won the primary and subsequently the general election. He was the only member of the Combs slate to win in the general election. For the four years he was in office, Governor Happy Chandler attempted to strip the Treasurer of its powers through legislation. The Carter home had become a popular meeting place for supporters of Bert Combs as they led a campaign against Harry Lee Waterfield's 1959 bid for Governor of Kentucky.

In 1959, Carter was elected Secretary of State of Kentucky on a ticket headed by Bert Combs. He held that position until 1964, when he assumed the role of Kentucky Auditor of Public Accounts in the Ned Breathitt administration. He held the title of auditor until his retirement from public service in 1968.

== Personal life ==
For many years, Carter was a resident of Frankfort. He owned a 1,000-acre farm in Morgan County, Kentucky, where he grew tobacco, purebred Hereford cattle, and mined limestone. He was also a partner in the West Liberty Oil and Gas Company.

== Death ==
Carter died on June 24, 1970, at Good Samaritan Hospital in Lexington, Kentucky, at the age of 66.

Political offices
Preceded by Joseph Schneider	Kentucky Auditor of Public Accounts; 1964–1968	Succeeded by Clyde Conley
Preceded by Thelma Stovall	Secretary of State of Kentucky; January 1, 1960–January 1, 1964	Succeeded by Thelma Stovall
Preceded by Pearl Frances Runyon	Kentucky State Treasurer; 1956–1960	Succeeded by Thelma Stovall
