= Thelma Stovall =

American politician (1919–1994)

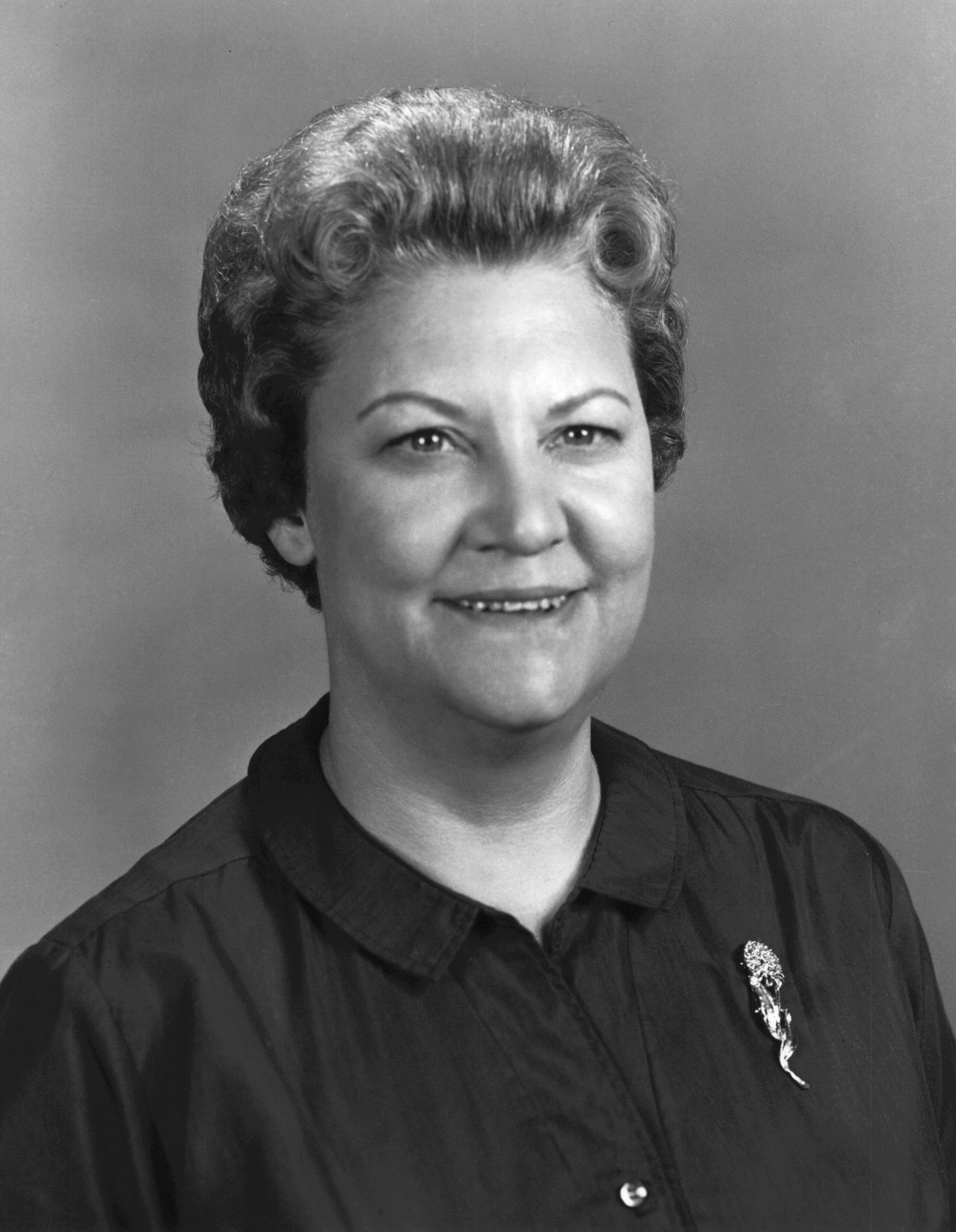
- Thelma Stovall in 1967: official portrait as Kentucky Secretary of State

47th Lieutenant Governor of Kentucky
- In office December 9, 1975 – December 11, 1979
- Governor: Julian Carroll
- Preceded by: Julian Carroll
- Succeeded by: Martha Layne Collins

70th, 72nd, & 76th Secretary of State of Kentucky
- In office January 3, 1972 – December 9, 1975
- Governor: Wendell Ford; Julian Carroll
- Preceded by: Kenneth F. Harper
- Succeeded by: Drexell R. Davis
- In office January 6, 1964 – January 1, 1968
- Governor: Ned Breathitt; Louie Nunn
- Preceded by: Henry H. Carter
- Succeeded by: Elmer Begley
- In office January 2, 1956 – January 4, 1960
- Governor: Happy Chandler; Bert Combs
- Preceded by: Charles K. O'Connell
- Succeeded by: Henry H. Carter

29th & 31st Kentucky State Treasurer
- In office January 1, 1968 – January 3, 1972
- Governor: Louie Nunn; Wendell Ford
- Preceded by: Emerson Beauchamp
- Succeeded by: Drexell R. Davis
- In office January 4, 1960 – January 6, 1964
- Governor: Bert Combs; Ned Breathitt
- Preceded by: Henry H. Carter
- Succeeded by: Emerson Beauchamp

Member of the Kentucky House of Representatives from the 38th district
- In office January 1, 1950 – January 1, 1956
- Preceded by: Charles L. Spilman
- Succeeded by: Clarence Miller

Personal details
- Born: Thelma Loyace Hawkins; April 1, 1919 Munfordville, Kentucky, U.S.
- Died: February 4, 1994 (aged 74) Louisville, Kentucky, U.S.
- Spouse: Lonnie Raymond Stovall
- Parent(s): Addie Mae (Goodman) and Samuel Dewey Hawkins
- Occupation: Politician, labor and civil rights activist

Thelma Loyace Stovall (née Hawkins; April 1, 1919 – February 4, 1994) was a pioneering American politician in the state of Kentucky. In 1949, she won election as state representative for Louisville and served three consecutive terms. Over the next two decades, Stovall was elected Kentucky State Treasurer twice and Secretary of State of Kentucky three times. She capped her career as the 47th lieutenant governor of Kentucky (1975–1979) in the administration of her fellow Democrat, Governor Julian Carroll. She was the first woman to hold the office.

Stovall was known for her assertive style. Several times in her career, when she found herself in the position of acting governor, she was unafraid of exercising that power – she issued gubernatorial pardons, called the Kentucky General Assembly into session to consider bills, and, most famously, issued an executive injunction against the Assembly's attempt to repeal Kentucky's ratification of the Equal Rights Amendment. Throughout her career, Stovall was an ardent advocate of labor and women's rights.

== Early life ==
Thelma Loyace Hawkins was born in Munfordville, Kentucky on April 1, 1919. Her parents, Samuel Dewey Hawkins and Addie Mae Goodman Hawkins, divorced when she was eight years old and she moved with her mother and sister Edith to Louisville.

She grew up around political activities: as a child she would hand out papers for her mother, who had become a precinct official in Louisville. The family lived an austere, working class life, a fact Stovall never resented: "I don't think it hurt to do without," she said. At the age of 15, she started working for the Brown & Williamson Tobacco Corporation to support her family during the Great Depression. She joined the Tobacco Workers International Union and became secretary of her local, TWIU 185. She kept that position for 11 years, and remained a stout supporter of labor unions throughout her later political career.

While working at the tobacco company, she met L. Raymond Stovall and the couple married in September 1936, when he was 18 and she was 17. She graduated from Louisville Girls' High School, then studied law at LaSalle Extension University in Chicago and attended summer school at the University of Kentucky and Eastern Kentucky University.

== Public office ==
Stovall became Louisville's first female state representative: she won election to the Kentucky House of Representatives in 1949 and was re-elected twice. She joined the Young Democrats of Kentucky and served as a national committee member (1952 to 1956) and then as the group's first woman president (1956 to 1958).

When the popular Democratic politician Happy Chandler ran for Governor in 1955, he tried to persuade Stovall to be on his ticket as Secretary of State of Kentucky. After she took too long thinking about it, Chandler simply announced her candidacy on his own. With no ill will, Stovall went along with the plan, although she thought she would never win. Ultimately, Stovall was elected Secretary of State three times, serving four-year terms beginning in 1956, 1964, and 1972. She also served two four-year terms as State Treasurer, beginning in 1960 and 1968.

In 1959, Stovall was secretary of state, the third-ranking office in Kentucky, when she discovered that the governor and lieutenant governor were both out of state. As the legal acting governor, she pardoned three prisoners, including a robber who had been given a life sentence for stealing $28.

By the early 1970s, she was a figure of some national stature: the Cincinnati Enquirer described her as "one of the most knowledgeable women in America regarding state government" and noted that she was in high demand for speaking engagements around the country. She also candidly discussed her plans for higher office.

== Lieutenant governor ==
In 1975, Stovall was the first woman nominated for Lieutenant Governor of Kentucky by either major political party. Stovall defeated the Republican nominee Shirley W. Palmer-Ball, with 430,011 votes (54.6%) to Palmer-Ball's 357,744 votes (45.4%).

As lieutenant governor, Stovall was not reluctant to invoke her powers as acting governor when Governor Julian Carroll left the state. During one of Carroll's absences, Stovall called the Kentucky General Assembly into special session to reduce taxation. Two bills were swiftly passed: one placed a statewide cap on property taxes while the other removed a 5% state tax on utility bills.

== Equal Rights Amendment ==
Her most famous intercession as acting governor came in March 1978 when, with Carroll out of the state, she vetoed the legislature's repeal of its ratification of the Equal Rights Amendment. The repeal had come to her as a late attachment to another bill regarding state pensions (House Joint Resolution 20) and Stovall claimed a legal right to reject it on two counts: the Kentucky constitution did not permit bills dealing with more than one subject, and there was a Senate rule that prohibited the introduction of new bills in the final ten days of any legislative session.

In an oral history interview in 1977, Stovall gave her plainspoken view of the ERA: "It's ridiculous after 200 years that women are still second class citizens. No – black men were allowed to vote fifty years before women could vote. As long there is still some statutes that say there are certain things that a woman can not do, we are still second class citizens." After her veto the following year, she resolutely defended her action, declaring: "Every elective official is faced sooner or later with the prospect of acting for political expediency, acting from conscience and law, or avoiding the issue by not acting at all. When the people vote to elect their leaders, they expect them to act and act decisively."

== Later career ==
Stovall sought election as Governor of Kentucky in 1979 but lost in the Democratic primary to John Y. Brown, Jr. who went on to win the general election. Stovall won 47,633 votes, taking fifth place behind Brown's 165,188 votes; 139,713 for Harvey I. Sloane, the mayor of Louisville; 131,530 for former state representative Terry McBrayer; and 68,577 for 1st District Congressman Carroll Hubbard. Stovall did finish ahead of four minor candidates in the primary, but it would be her last race and the only loss of her career.

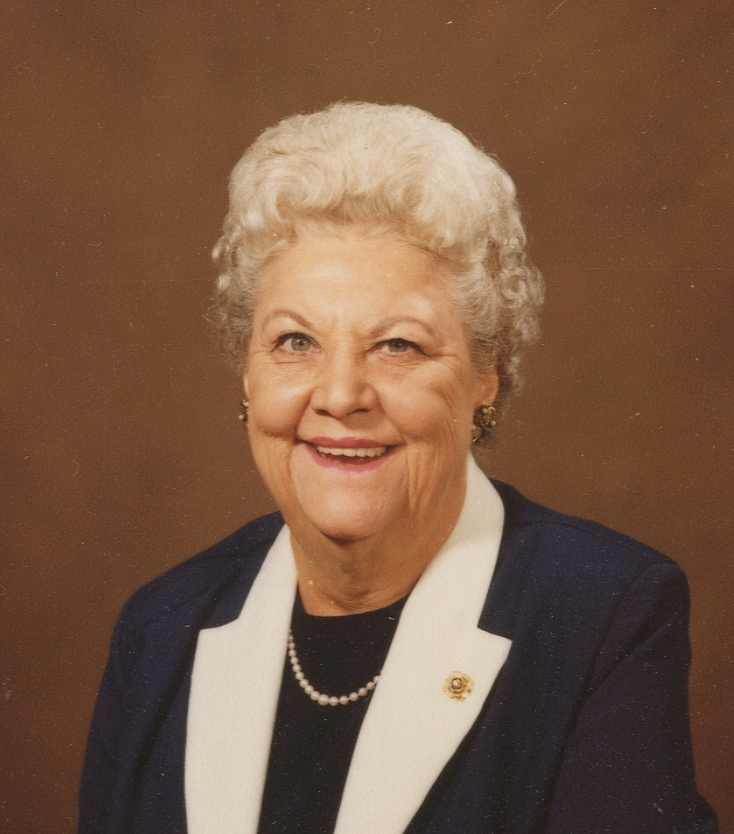
Thelma Stovall in 1983 while Commissioner of Labor in the Cabinet for Governor John Y. Brown Jr.

After the primary, Stovall announced her retirement from state politics. To celebrate her 30 years of public service, a large party was held in the Kentucky State Capitol on December 3, 1979. Congratulations were sent by President Jimmy Carter and the date was officially proclaimed by the state as "Thelma Stovall Day".

Despite their former rivalry, Brown appointed Stovall as the state's Commissioner of Labor in December 1982. In his announcement, Brown praised her as "the grande dame of the feminist movement and ... the indisputable advocate of working people".

== Death ==
Stovall died in her sleep in Louisville at the age of 74. She was honored by being allowed to lie in state in the Capitol Rotunda. She is interred at Louisville's Resthaven Cemetery.

== Honors ==
Thelma Stovall Park is located along the Green River in her hometown of Munfordville.

Stovall's portrait, painted by Louisville portrait painter Doris Leist, hangs in the Capitol and a plaque commemorating her achievements was placed there in 1982. A Kentucky newspaper wrote in praise for one of the state's most controversial politicians:

Say what you will about Thelma Stovall, you always knew where she stood.

Stovall's portrait was also painted by Grant County, Kentucky artist William Joseph Petrie in 1975. The painting is now in the collection of the Kentucky Historical Society.

== See also ==
- List of female lieutenant governors in the United States

Party political offices
Preceded by Henry H. Carter	Democratic nominee for Kentucky State Treasurer; 1959	Succeeded by Emerson Beauchamp
Preceded by Henry H. Carter	Democratic nominee for Secretary of State of Kentucky; 1963	Succeeded by Claude Reed
Preceded by Emerson Beauchamp	Democratic nominee for Kentucky State Treasurer; 1967	Succeeded by Drexell R. Davis
Preceded by Claude Reed	Democratic nominee for Secretary of State of Kentucky; 1971	Succeeded by Drexell R. Davis
Preceded by Julian Carroll	Democratic nominee for Lieutenant Governor of Kentucky; 1975	Succeeded by Martha Layne Collins
Political offices
Preceded by Julian Carroll	Lieutenant Governor of Kentucky; 1975–1979	Succeeded by Martha Layne Collins
Preceded by Kenneth F. Harper	Kentucky Secretary of State; 1972–1975	Succeeded by Drexell R. Davis
Preceded by Emerson Beauchamp	Kentucky State Treasurer; 1968–1972	Succeeded by Drexell R. Davis
Preceded by Henry H. Carter	Kentucky Secretary of State; 1964–1968	Succeeded by Elmer Begley
Preceded by Henry H. Carter	Kentucky State Treasurer; 1960–1964	Succeeded by Emerson Beauchamp
Preceded by Charles K. O'Connell	Kentucky Secretary of State; 1956–1960	Succeeded by Henry H. Carter
