= 1967 Kentucky gubernatorial election =

- November 7, 1967
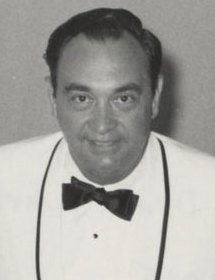

Nominee	Louie Nunn	Henry Ward
Party	Republican	Democratic
Popular vote	454,123	425,674
Percentage	51.20%	47.99%
- Nunn: 40–50% 50–60% 60–70% 70–80% 80–90% Ward: 50–60% 60–70% 70–80%
Governor before election
Ned Breathitt
Democratic
Elected Governor
Louie Nunn
Republican

The 1967 Kentucky gubernatorial election was held on November 7, 1967. Republican nominee Louie Nunn defeated Democratic nominee Henry Ward with 51.20% of the vote. Nunn became the first Republican elected since 1943.

== Primary elections ==
Primary elections were held on May 23, 1967.

=== Democratic primary ===
==== Candidates ====
- Henry Ward, former State Senator
- Happy Chandler, former Governor
- Harry Lee Waterfield, incumbent Lieutenant Governor
- David Trapp
- J.D. Buckman
- Helen Breeden
- William Shires
- Jesse N.R. Cecil
- Wilton Benge Cupp
- W.E. Day

==== Results ====
Democratic primary results
Party	Candidate	Votes	%
Democratic	Henry Ward	207,797	52.36
Democratic	Happy Chandler	111,782	28.17
Democratic	Harry Lee Waterfield	42,583	10.73
Democratic	David Trapp	17,635	4.44
Democratic	J.D. Buckman	7,660	1.93
Democratic	Helen Breeden	2,464	0.62
Democratic	William Shires	1,905	0.48
Democratic	Jesse N.R. Cecil	1,748	0.44
Democratic	Wilton Benge Cupp	1,739	0.44
Democratic	W.E. Day	1,525	0.38
Total votes		396,838	100.00

=== Republican primary ===
==== Candidates ====
- Louie Nunn, former Barren County judge
- Marlow Cook, Jefferson County Judge/Executive
- Thurman Jerome Hamlin, perennial candidate

==== Results ====
Republican primary results
Party	Candidate	Votes	%
Republican	Louie Nunn	90,216	50.39
Republican	Marlow Cook	86,397	48.26
Republican	Thurman Jerome Hamlin	2,419	1.35
Total votes		179,032	100.00

== General election ==
=== Candidates ===
Major party candidates

- Louie Nunn, Republican
- Henry Ward, Democratic

Other candidates

- Christian Glanz, Conservative

=== Results ===
1967 Kentucky gubernatorial election
Party	Candidate	Votes	%	±%
Republican	Louie B. Nunn	454,123	51.20	+1.94
Democratic	Henry Ward	425,674	47.99	−2.74
Conservative	Christian H. Glanz Jr.	7,149	0.81	N/A
Total votes		886,946	100.0	N/A
Republican gain from Democratic				
