= 1959 Kentucky gubernatorial election =

- November 3, 1959
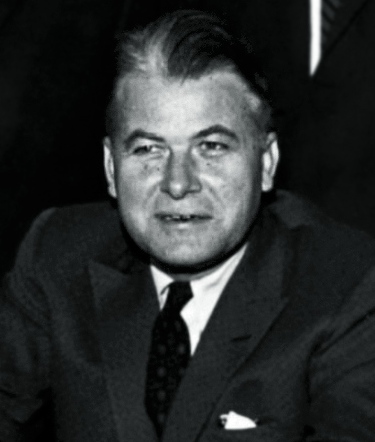

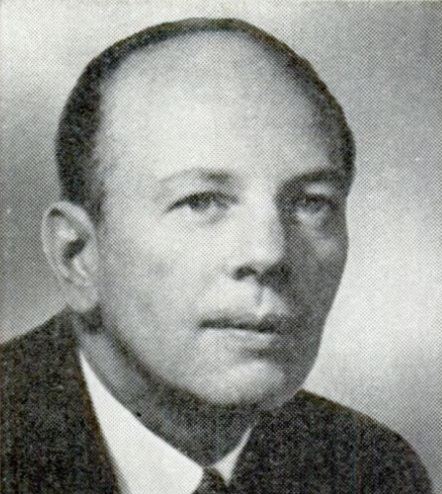
Nominee	Bert Combs	John M. Robsion Jr.
Party	Democratic	Republican
Popular vote	516,549	336,456
Percentage	60.56%	39.44%
- Combs: 50–60% 60–70% 70–80% 80–90% Robsion: 50–60% 60–70% 70–80%
Governor before election
Happy Chandler
Democratic
Elected Governor
Bert Combs
Democratic

The 1959 Kentucky gubernatorial election was held on November 3, 1959. Democratic nominee Bert Combs defeated Republican nominee John M. Robsion Jr. with 60.56% of the vote.

== Primary elections ==
Primary elections were held on May 25, 1959.

=== Democratic primary ===
==== Candidates ====
- Bert Combs, Judge of the Kentucky Court of Appeals
- Harry Lee Waterfield, former Lieutenant Governor
- Jesse N. R. Cecil
- James L. Delk

==== Results ====
Results by county: Combs: 40–50%; 50–60%; 60–70%; 70–80%; Waterfield: 40–50%; 50–60%; 60–70%; 70–80%

Democratic primary results
Party	Candidate	Votes	%
Democratic	Bert Combs	292,462	52.25
Democratic	Harry Lee Waterfield	259,461	46.36
Democratic	Jesse N. R. Cecil	4,303	0.77
Democratic	James L. Delk	3,474	0.62
Total votes		559,700	100.00

=== Republican primary ===
==== Candidates ====
- John M. Robsion Jr., former U.S. Representatives
- Thurman Jerome Hamlin, perennial candidate
- Granville Thomas

==== Results ====
Republican primary results
Party	Candidate	Votes	%
Republican	John M. Robsion Jr.	63,130	86.31
Republican	Thurman Jerome Hamlin	6,019	8.23
Republican	Granville Thomas	3,991	5.46
Total votes		73,140	100.00

== General election ==
=== Candidates ===
- Bert Combs, Democratic
- John M. Robsion Jr., Republican

=== Results ===
1959 Kentucky gubernatorial election
Party	Candidate	Votes	%	±%
Democratic	Bert T. Combs	516,549	60.56	+2.54
Republican	John M. Robsion Jr.	336,456	39.44	−2.00
Total votes		853,005	100.0	N/A
Democratic hold				
