= Wyatt, Tarrant & Combs =

U.S. law firm

Wyatt, Tarrant & Combs, LLP
- No. of offices: 5
- No. of attorneys: 125+
- Major practice areas: General practice
- Key people: Franklin K. Jelsma, Managing Partner
- Date founded: 1812
- Founder: Wilson W. Wyatt, John E. Tarrant, Bert T. Combs
- Company type: Limited liability partnership
- Website: www.wyattfirm.com

Wyatt, Tarrant & Combs LLP is an American regional law firm with its largest office in Louisville, Kentucky. The firm traces its roots back more than 200 years to 1812, when Alexander Scott Bullitt opened his law practice. Wyatt has changed significantly since those frontier days and is now a full-service regional law firm with offices in Louisville and Lexington, Kentucky; New Albany, Indiana; and Memphis and Nashville, Tennessee.

== Notable lawyers and alumni ==
- Wilson W. Wyatt, former Lieutenant Governor of Kentucky and Mayor of Louisville, Kentucky
- Bert T. Combs, former Governor of Kentucky
- Gordon B. Davidson, former Managing Partner at Wyatt, Tarrant & Combs and attorney for the "Louisville Sponsoring Group," a collaboration of business leaders who provided the funding for Muhammad Ali's launch into professional boxing
- Dr. Benjamin Hooks, American civil rights leader and former executive director of the National Association for the Advancement of Colored People (NAACP)
- Frank W. Burke, former Mayor of Louisville, Kentucky
- Pamela R. Goodwine, justice of the Kentucky Supreme Court
