= Kenneth A. Schmied =

American politician (1911–1973)

50th Mayor of Louisville
- In office 1965–1969
- Preceded by: William O. Cowger
- Succeeded by: Frank W. Burke

Personal details
- Born: July 18, 1911 Louisville, Kentucky, U.S.
- Died: April 5, 1973 (aged 61) Louisville, Kentucky, U.S.
- Resting place: Cave Hill Cemetery; Louisville, Kentucky, U.S.
- Party: Republican

Kenneth Albert Schmied (July 18, 1911 – April 5, 1973) (Note: Date of birth is per his draft registration card of October 1940; some sources list July 11 rather than July 18.) was an American politician in Kentucky. He served as the mayor of Louisville from 1965 until 1969. He remains the most recent member of the Republican Party to have held the office.

== Career ==
A native of Louisville, Schmied was elected to the city's board of aldermen in 1961 and served as the board's president. He was later "hand picked" by then-mayor William O. Cowger to be his successor. During Schmied's tenure as mayor, a $29.8 million bond issue was used for public works projects including expansion of the city's public library, a site for Jefferson Community College, and medical and dental facilities at the University of Louisville. The city's 1969 mayoral elections saw Democrat Frank W. Burke win the office.

Schmied served in the U.S. Army during World War II, having enlisted in May 1943. He died of a heart attack in 1973 at age 61 while attending a political meeting in Louisville. Schmied is buried in Cave Hill Cemetery in Louisville.

== See also ==
- List of mayors of Louisville, Kentucky

== Notes ==
Political offices
| Preceded by William O. Cowger | Mayor of Louisville, Kentucky; 1965–1969 | Succeeded by Frank W. Burke |
