= Frank W. Burke =

American politician (1920–2007)

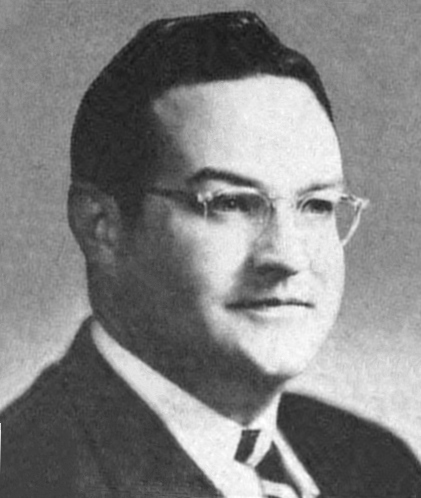

51st Mayor of Louisville
- In office December 1969 – December 1, 1973
- Preceded by: Kenneth A. Schmied
- Succeeded by: Harvey I. Sloane

Member of the U.S. House of Representatives from Kentucky's 3rd district
- In office January 3, 1959 – January 3, 1963
- Preceded by: John M. Robsion Jr.
- Succeeded by: Gene Snyder

Member of the Kentucky House of Representatives from the 37th district
- In office January 1, 1958 – January 3, 1959
- Preceded by: Edward O. Bridgers
- Succeeded by: Lawrence H. Osting

Personal details
- Born: June 1, 1920 Louisville, Kentucky, U.S.
- Died: June 29, 2007 (aged 87) Louisville, Kentucky, U.S.
- Party: Democratic
- Education: University of Southern California; Xavier University; University of Louisville

Frank Welsh Burke (June 1, 1920 – June 29, 2007) was an American politician who served as a Democratic member of the United States House of Representatives from Kentucky from 1959 to 1963 and as mayor of Louisville, Kentucky, from 1969 to 1973.

== Early life and career ==
Burke was born in Louisville, Kentucky and educated in parochial schools there, graduating from St. Xavier High School. He attended the University of Southern California and received a degree from Xavier University and a law degree from the University of Louisville. He began practicing law in Louisville in 1948. Burke served in the United States Army during World War II. Burke held appointed local offices under mayor Charles R. Farnsley including as assistant city attorney of Louisville in 1950 and 1951, director of public safety of Louisville in 1952, and executive assistant to the mayor of Louisville, Kentucky, in 1952 and 1953.

== Political career ==
Burke was elected to the Kentucky House of Representatives in 1957, defeating Democratic incumbent Edward Bridgers for renomination.

In 1958 Burke was elected to the United States House of Representatives from Kentucky's 3rd District (Louisville). Burke defeated incumbent Republican John M. Robsion, Jr. for the seat. Burke was re-elected to the House seat in 1960 and served from January 3, 1959, to January 3, 1963. Burke won his re-election race by 221 votes. Burke voted in favor of the Civil Rights Act of 1960.

He was defeated in a close race for re-election in 1962 by Gene Snyder; Snyder won 93,627 votes to Burke's 91,062.

In 1969, Republicans had controlled county and city offices in Louisville for eight years. Burke, a Democrat, was elected mayor of Louisville that year, winning 48,337 votes to Republican John Porter Sawyer's 40,810. Burke served in that office from 1969 to 1973. Burke's priorities included reducing crime; he increased the size of the police force and installed many new street lights and the crime rate in Louisville dropped while Burke was mayor. Burke also increased garbage pickups and the sewers and pushed the construction of the Louisville Belvedere. Burke also instituted a retirement system for city employees. As mayor, he integrated the city's workforce.

== Later life ==
Burke continued to practice law in Kentucky with Wyatt, Tarrant & Combs until 2005. He died in June 2007.

U.S. House of Representatives
Preceded by John M. Robsion, Jr.	Member of the U.S. House of Representatives from Kentucky's 3rd congressional district 1959–1963	Succeeded by Gene Snyder
Political offices
Preceded by Kenneth A. Schmied	Mayor of Louisville, Kentucky; 1969–1973	Succeeded by Harvey I. Sloane
