= Lawrence Wetherby =

American politician (1908–1994)

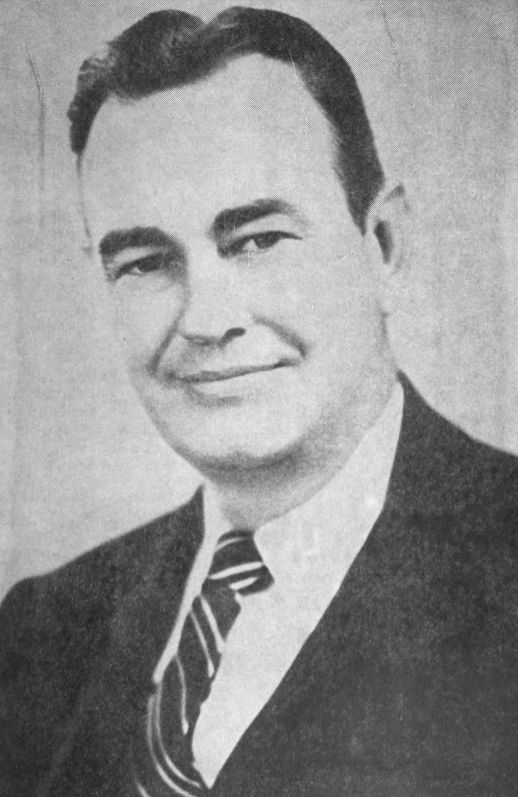
- Wetherby, c. 1954

48th Governor of Kentucky
- In office November 27, 1950 – December 13, 1955
- Lieutenant: Emerson Beauchamp
- Preceded by: Earle Clements
- Succeeded by: Happy Chandler

40th Lieutenant Governor of Kentucky
- In office December 9, 1947 – November 27, 1950
- Governor: Earle Clements
- Preceded by: Kenneth H. Tuggle
- Succeeded by: Emerson Beauchamp

Member of the Kentucky Senate from the 20th district
- In office January 1, 1966 – January 1, 1970
- Preceded by: Marvin Edwards
- Succeeded by: Mack Walters

Personal details
- Born: Lawrence Winchester Wetherby; January 2, 1908 Middletown, Kentucky, U.S.
- Died: March 27, 1994 (aged 86) Frankfort, Kentucky, U.S.
- Resting place: Frankfort Cemetery
- Party: Democratic
- Spouse: Helen Dwyer
- Education: University of Louisville (LLB)
- Profession: Lawyer

Lawrence Winchester Wetherby (January 2, 1908 – March 27, 1994) was an American politician who served as 40th lieutenant governor and the 48th governor of Kentucky. He was the first of only two Kentucky governors born in Jefferson County, despite the fact that Louisville (the county seat) is the state's most populous city. The second governor born in Jefferson County is the incumbent governor, Democrat Andy Beshear, who grew up in the Lexington area. Two other governors have been elected when residents of Jefferson: Republicans Augustus Willson, 1907–11, and Matt Bevin, 2015–19.

After graduating from the University of Louisville, Wetherby held several offices in the Jefferson County judicial system before being elected lieutenant governor in 1947 as the quiet choice of Democrat 2nd District U.S. Rep. Earle C. Clements from Morganfield, who won the primary for the top job. Wetherby was called Kentucky's first "working" lieutenant governor because Clements had him carry out duties beyond his constitutional responsibility to preside over the state Senate, such as preparing the state budget and attending the Southern Governors Conference. In 1950, Clements was elected to the U.S. Senate, elevating Wetherby to governor on Nov. 27. Wetherby won immediate acclaim by calling a special legislative session to increase funding for education and government benefits from the state's budget surplus, which had been boosted by the Korean War. In 1951, campaigning as a "Middletown farmer" in a largely rural state, he won a full four-year term, during which he continued and expanded many of Clements' programs, including increased road construction and industrial diversification. He endorsed the Supreme Court's 1954 desegregation order in the case of Brown v. Board of Education and appointed a biracial commission to oversee the successful integration of the state's schools. As chairman of the Southern Governors Conference in 1954 and 1955, he encouraged other Southern governors to accept and implement desegregation.

Limited to one term by the state constitution, Wetherby joined Clements and Lt. Gov. Emerson Beauchamp in supporting Bert Combs for governor, but Combs lost in the Democratic primary to former governor A. B. "Happy" Chandler, their factional adversary. When Democratic Sen. Alben W. Barkley died in April 1956, Clements refused to compromise with Chandler on selection of a Democrat for the special election to fill the vacancy, and got the state Democratic committee to nominate Wetherby. With Chandler's organization against them, Wetherby lost to Republican John Sherman Cooper, a former senator who had lost to Barkley in 1954, and Clements narrowly lost to Republican Thruston Morton.

In 1964–65, Wetherby served on a commission that proposed a new state constitution, and in 1965 he was elected to the state Senate from Frankfort, where he provided leadership in drafting the state budget and served as Senate president pro tempore. Following this, he retired from politics and served as a consultant for Brighton Engineering in Frankfort. Wetherby died on March 27, 1994, of complications from a broken hip and was buried in Frankfort Cemetery in Frankfort, Kentucky.

== Early life and career ==
Lawrence Wetherby was born January 2, 1908, in Middletown, Kentucky. He was the fourth child of Samuel Davis and Fanny (Yenowine) Wetherby. His grandfather was a surgeon in the Union Army during the Civil War. His father was also a physician and farmer, and during his childhood years, Wetherby worked on the family farm.

After graduating from Anchorage High School, Wetherby enrolled in the pre-law program at the University of Louisville. He was a letterman on the football team in 1927 and 1928; he also played second base on the baseball team in 1928 and 1929, and was a letterman in that sport in 1929. He was later inducted into the university's Athletic Hall of Fame. In 1929, he earned his Bachelor of Laws degree and went to work for Judge Henry Tilford. The two would remain partners until 1950. On April 24, 1930, he married Helen Dwyer; the couple had three children.

Thanks to his father's influence, Wetherby became interested in local politics at an early age. School board races fascinated him, and he allied himself with a faction of the Jefferson County Democratic Party headed by Leland Taylor and Ben Ewing. When Ewing was elected county judge in 1933, he appointed Wetherby as a part-time attorney for the Jefferson County juvenile court. He held this position through 1937, then returned to it in 1942 and 1943. In March 1943, he was appointed the first trial commissioner of the juvenile court.

== Lieutenant governor ==
Wetherby was elected chairman of the 34th Legislative District Democratic Committee in 1943 and held the position through 1956. In March 1947, he resigned as trial commissioner of the juvenile court in order to run for lieutenant governor. The strongest of his four opponents in the Democratic primary was Bill May, the nephew of U.S. Representative Andrew J. May. May had sought the support of gubernatorial candidate Earle Clements, but Clements refused and chose Wetherby as his unofficial running mate. Wetherby was unable to secure Clements' public endorsement until just before the primary, but narrowly won the primary over May and went on to defeat Republican Orville M. Howard by over 95,000 votes.

Some observers called Wetherby Kentucky's first "working" lieutenant governor. Previous lieutenant governors did little beyond their constitutionally mandated duty of presiding over the Kentucky Senate, but during Clements' administration, Wetherby was charged with preparing a state budget, presiding over the Legislative Research Commission, leading tours for the state Chamber of Commerce, and attending the Southern Governors Conference. Clements also made Wetherby executive secretary of the State Democratic Central Committee, which allowed Wetherby to make many important political contacts.

== Governor of Kentucky 1950–1955 ==
=== Partial term (1950–51) ===
On Nov. 27, 1950, Clements was sworn in as senator for the remainder of an unexpired term, vacating the office of governor and filling it with Wetherby. One of his first actions was to call a special legislative session for March 6, 1951, for the purpose of allocating the state's $10 million budget surplus. Among the expenditures approved in the special session were increases in teachers' salaries, a topic on which Clements had been more conservative, and state benefits for the needy and government employees. Wetherby's popularity soared as a result of this session, and he seriously considered running for the Senate seat vacated by the death of Virgil Chapman in 1951 but his wife and children vetoed the idea. With the support of Beauchamp, who slated with him for lieutenant governor, he ran for his own term as governor.

=== 1951 gubernatorial election ===
Among the potential candidates for the Democratic gubernatorial nomination in 1951 was former governor A. B. "Happy" Chandler, who was about to be released as baseball commissioner. Chandler and Clements were factional foes, and the possibility of a Chandler candidacy provided the Clements faction with the impetus to unite behind Wetherby to prevent Chandler from gaining the nomination. Ultimately, Chandler did not seek the nomination and, despite implying that Clements controlled Wetherby, Chandler endorsed Wetherby on May 15, 1951. Wetherby had little trouble defeating Howell Vincent and Jesse Cecil in the Democratic gubernatorial primary, polling the largest majority ever in a Kentucky primary race.

In the general election, Wetherby faced Republican Court of Appeals Judge Eugene Siler. Siler was a fundamentalist Christian who claimed that the state government was full of corruption, and only he could stop it. Citing the gambling in Northern Kentucky, bribery accusations against members of Clements' and Wetherby's administrations, and a 1951 scandal involving the University of Kentucky men's basketball team, he referred to Frankfort as "our Nineveh on the Kentucky River". Wetherby countered Siler's accusations of corruption by removing one of the officials accused of bribery from office. He deployed the newly organized Kentucky State Police to counter organized crime in Campbell and Henderson counties. To further discourage crime, he supported legislation to revoke the alcohol licenses of establishments that allowed gambling. Siler's pro-temperance and anti-Catholic views played well in the state's rural areas, but cost him the vote of the state's growing urban population. Wetherby won a full term by 58,331 votes—a margin of 54.6%-45.4%.

=== Full term (1951–55) ===
Early in Wetherby's term, the state's revenues were inflated by the Korean War. Having adopted a pay-as-you-go program for the state, he was forced to raise additional revenue after the war ended. He did so by imposing sin taxes on cigarettes, alcoholic beverages, and parimutuel betting, but he was unable to convince the General Assembly to adopt a sales tax.

Because three members of Wetherby's close family had been killed in automobile accidents on the state's roadways, improving roads was a high priority for him. Using revenue from a 2-cent-per-gallon gasoline tax passed under the Clements administration, Wetherby authorized the building, re-building, or re-surfacing of nearly 6,000 miles (9,700 km) of roads during his administration. The most important of these was the state's first toll road, the Kentucky Turnpike, connecting Louisville and Elizabethtown. He encouraged President Dwight D. Eisenhower to construct a federal toll road connecting the Great Lakes and the Gulf of Mexico. Calls for major highway work from other political leaders persuaded Eisenhower to endorse the long-discussed Interstate Highway System. Improved roads brought increased tourism, which Wetherby supported by increasing funding to the state park system and adding Breaks Interstate Park, a new park owned jointly by Kentucky and Virginia. Wetherby also brought national attention to Kentucky as prime hunting and fishing land by conducting his own personal sporting excursions in the state.

Wetherby followed Clements in trying to diversify industries in Kentucky to balance the state's primarily agrarian economy. He expanded the Agricultural and Industrial Development Board and charged it with conducting land surveys to identify potential industrial sites. He encouraged the development of modern airports in the state and supported the canalization of the Big Sandy River and improvement of the locks and dams on the Kentucky River. He continued to personally lead tours given by the state's Chamber of Commerce. Among the industries that came to the state during his administration were the General Electric Appliance Park in Louisville and the Paducah Gaseous Diffusion Plant in Paducah. In 1954, he used the state police to quash labor unrest in Central City and other parts of the Western Kentucky Coalfield. He was not a pawn of industry, however: a supporter of organized labor, he killed a right-to-work bill in 1954. During his time as governor, he also secured passage of the state's first laws regulating strip mining and

Neither did Wetherby ignore the needs of agriculture. Under his Green Pastures Program, measures were enacted to diversify crop production, improve beef production, and encourage soil conservation. He secured federal flood control programs for the watersheds of the Salt, Licking, Green, and Kentucky Rivers, saving valuable farmland. In 1952, Wetherby organized an agricultural council to consolidate the work of the state's agricultural bureaucracy. He oversaw completion of the state fairgrounds in Louisville, a project begun under Clements, to better display the state's agricultural products.

Improvements in education were a hallmark of Wetherby's term as governor. Over the course of his administration, he increased funding to education by $20 million. He called for the creation of an educational television network and initiated the state's first publicly funded bookmobile program. He supported the 1954 Minimum Foundation Program, an amendment to the state constitution that allowed funding to be allocated to school districts based upon need rather than number of pupils.

In 1954 and 1955 Wetherby chaired the Southern Governors Conference and urged the sgovernors to peacefully implement desegregation as required by the Supreme Court's decision in Brown v. Board of Education. He was one of five Southern governors who refused to sign a statement opposing integration. In Kentucky, he appointed an advisory council of both white and black citizens to oversee public school integration, which was accomplished with little acrimony compared to other states. Desegregation was one issue where Wetherby and Beauchamp disagreed, but because Beauchamp hoped to succeed Wetherby as governor, he did not openly oppose Wetherby's actions.

Among Wetherby's other accomplishments were the creation of a Department of Mental Health and the construction of 15 hospitals and 30 health centers throughout the state. In 1952, he created the Youth Authority as a central point for the administration of services to delinquent children. He constructed new state prisons, modernized the probation and parole systems, and established a more orderly system of selecting grand and petit juries. He also oversaw some voting reform measures, including the provision of funds to purchase voting machines in areas where they were desired. He was not as successful in the area of government reform. He failed in his efforts to amend the state's constitution to allow the governor to serve consecutive terms. He was also unable to win support for a plan to consolidate some of Kentucky's counties. In 1955, the state's voters approved a constitutional amendment granting suffrage to 18-year-olds over Wetherby's objections.

=== 1955 gubernatorial election ===
Clements and Wetherby concluded that Beauchamp would not be the best candidate for governor against Chandler, and endorsed Bert Combs for governor. Wetherby had named Combs to the Kentucky Court of Appeals in 1951 to fill a vacancy created by the death of Judge Roy Helm. Chandler ran his campaign not just against Combs, but against Clements and Wetherby, painting Combs as a pawn of "Clementine" and "Wetherbine." He charged both Clements and Wetherby with extravagant spending in their administrations. Among his allegations were that Clements had purchased a $20,000 rug for his office and that Wetherby had paneled his office with African mahogany. Chandler promised that, if elected, he would use "good, honest Kentucky wood" in his office and that all Kentuckians would be invited to the capitol to walk on the $20,000 rug. Ultimately, invoices showed that no $20,000 rug had been purchased by Clements, and Wetherby's paneling had been purchased from and installed by a local contractor. Chandler's charges may have been inaccurate, but he defeated Combs in the primary and went on to win the general election.

== 1956 U.S. Senate bid ==
Following his term as governor, Wetherby resumed his private law practice. In 1956, U.S. Senator Alben W. Barkley unexpectedly died of a heart attack. The timing of his death meant that the state would elect two senators in 1956. Clements' term was expiring and now Barkley's seat was vacant. Eisenhower convinced former senator and ambassador John Sherman Cooper to be the Republican candidate for the Barkley seat, hoping Cooper's immense popularity in the state would help his own re-election bid and help Republicans regain control of the Senate. Barkley's death occurred so late in the year that there was not time for a Democratic primary to choose the party's candidate for the open seat; Chandler had persuaded the legislature to move the primary from early August to late May to complicate the re-election bid of Clements, who had become acting majority leader when Senate Majority Leader Lyndon B. Johnson suffered a heart attack in 1955. Gov. Chandler proposed that the Democratic state committee nominate his close ally Joe Leary, who was friendly with Clements, but Clements had the committee choose Wetherby, who was only six months removed from his term as governor.

Neither Wetherby nor Clements enjoyed the support of Chandler. During the infrequent visits Clements was able to make to the state, he campaigned for his former lieutenant governor as well as himself. In the general election, Cooper defeated Wetherby by 65,365 votes, and Clements lost to Thruston Morton by 6,981 votes. It was the first time Clements had lost a race, and Kentucky Democrats would not elect a senator for another 16 years.

== State senator 1966–70 ==
After this defeat, Wetherby moved to the state capital of Frankfort and secured a position at Brighton Engineering, owned by his former foe, Bill May. From 1964 to 1966, he and other ex-governors served in the legislatively created Constitution Revision Assembly, which proposed a new state constitution, chaired by Clements. In 1965, May backed Wetherby in his campaign for a four-year term in the state Senate. He won the election, defeating the candidate favored by Chandler, and was one of seven primary candidates who unseated senators aligned with Lt. Gov. Harry Lee Waterfield, a factional foe of Gov. Edward "Ned" Breathitt. That gave Breathitt a working majority, and senators elected Wetherby president pro tem. The state's budget was debated for only 10 days before passing by a vote of 31–5 in virtually the same form as it was presented.

== Death ==
After his service in the state Senate, Wetherby returned to Brighton, where he became a vice-president. He died March 27, 1994, of complications from a broken hip. He is buried at the Frankfort Cemetery. The administration building at Western Kentucky University and a gymnasium at Morehead State University are named in his honor. A statue of Wetherby was dedicated at Middletown City Hall in 2014.

Political offices
Preceded by Kenneth H. Tuggle	Lieutenant Governor of Kentucky; December 9, 1947 – November 27, 1950	Succeeded by Emerson Beauchamp
Preceded by Earle C. Clements	Governor of Kentucky; November 27, 1950 – December 13, 1955	Succeeded by Happy Chandler
Party political offices
Preceded by Earle C. Clements	Democratic nominee for Governor of Kentucky; 1951	Succeeded by Happy Chandler
Preceded by Alben W. Barkley	Democratic nominee for U.S. Senator from Kentucky; 1956 (special)	Succeeded by Keen Johnson
