= Emerson Beauchamp =

American politician (1899–1971)

Emerson "Doc" Beauchamp
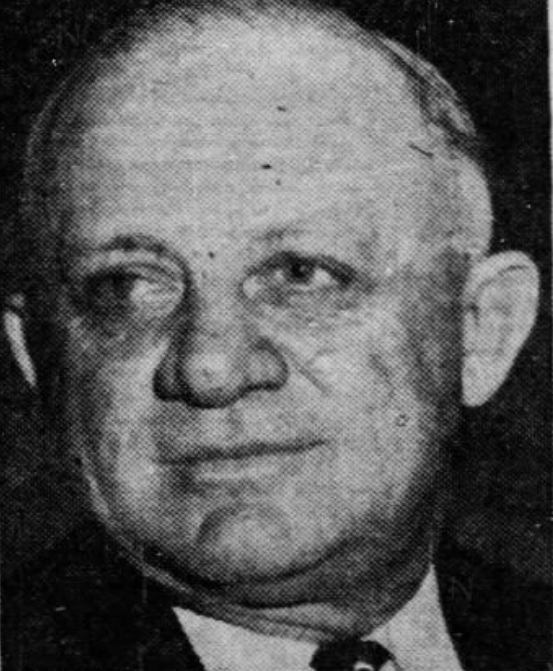

30th Kentucky State Treasurer
- In office January 6, 1964 – January 1, 1968
- Governor: Ned Breathitt; Louie Nunn
- Preceded by: Thelma Stovall
- Succeeded by: Thelma Stovall

22nd Kentucky Commissioner of Agriculture
- In office January 4, 1960 – January 6, 1964
- Preceded by: Ben J. Butler
- Succeeded by: Wendell P. Butler

41st Lieutenant Governor of Kentucky
- In office December 11, 1951 – December 13, 1955
- Governor: Lawrence Wetherby
- Preceded by: Lawrence Wetherby
- Succeeded by: Harry Lee Waterfield

Sheriff of Logan County, Kentucky
- In office 1938–1941

Clerk of Logan County, Kentucky
- In office 1926–1932

Personal details
- Born: Isaac Emerson Beauchamp; June 14, 1899 Logan County, Kentucky
- Died: April 15, 1971 (aged 71)
- Resting place: Maple Grove Cemetery; Russellville, Kentucky
- Nickname: Doc Beauchamp

Military service
- Allegiance: United States
- Branch/service: U. S. Army
- Rank: Captain
- Battles/wars: World War II

Isaac Emerson Beauchamp (June 14, 1899 – April 15, 1971) was an American politician from the state of Kentucky. A Democrat, he was elected the 41st lieutenant governor of Kentucky in 1951, Kentucky Commissioner of Agriculture in 1959, and Kentucky State Treasurer in 1963.

== Biography ==
Beauchamp was born in Logan County, Kentucky on June 14, 1899, the son of Isaac and Ella (Offutt) Beauchamp. The Beauchamp family included several doctors, and Beauchamp's parents hoped he would enter the medical profession, so they called him "Doc" from an early age. Beauchamp became a farmer and was involved in politics from an early age, including serving as a legislative page, serving as assistant clerk and clerk of the Kentucky Senate, and winning election to leadership roles on the Kentucky Democratic State Committee. Beauchamp served in the U.S. Army during World War I and World War II and attained the rank of captain.

Beauchamp served as Logan County Clerk (1926–1932) and then Sheriff of Logan County (1938–1941). He was appointed chief clerk of the state senate in 1946 and director of the state department of personnel in 1947. From 1948 to 1951 he was the state's rural highway commissioner. In 1951 he was elected Lieutenant Governor of Kentucky and he served from 1951 to 1955. Beauchamp was a delegate to the Democratic National Conventions in 1952, 1956, 1960, and 1964. From 1960 to 1963 he was Kentucky's Commissioner of Agriculture. He served as Kentucky State Treasurer from 1964 through 1967.

== Death and burial ==
Beauchamp died in on April 15, 1971. He was buried at Maple Grove Cemetery in Russellville, Kentucky.

== Family ==
In 1924, Beauchamp married Elizabeth Orndorff. They were the parents of two sons, Russell and Emerson.

Political offices
Preceded by Lawrence Wetherby	Lieutenant Governor of Kentucky; 1951–1955	Succeeded by Harry Lee Waterfield
Preceded by Thelma Stovall	Kentucky State Treasurer; 1964–1968	Succeeded by Thelma Stovall
Preceded by Ben J. Butler	Kentucky Commissioner of Agriculture; 1960–1964	Succeeded by Wendell P. Butler
