= Henry Ward (Kentucky politician) =

American politician (1909–2002)

Henry Ward (June 20, 1909 – October 8, 2002) was an American Democratic politician from Kentucky who held positions in state administrations and was his party's nominee for governor in 1967. Ward lost the general election to Republican Louie B. Nunn, who received 454,123 votes (51.2%) to Ward's 425,674 (48.0%).

== Biography ==
Ward's political career began with his election to the Kentucky House of Representatives on the strength of his editorial battles as a journalist against electric utilities, whom Ward accused of providing unreliable coverage for the prices charged. He was re-elected to the House four more times and was named majority leader before he stepped down in 1943. As a state legislator, Ward was a strong supporter of Franklin D. Roosevelt and the New Deal. Two years later, he won a seat in the Kentucky Senate, and served there from 1945 to 1948. The same year, Earle Clements appointed Ward to be commissioner of conservation, a post he held for eight years. He played a key role in founding Kentucky's network of state parks.

In 1960, Ward headed the state parks system until Earle Clements resigned as highway commissioner and Gov. Bert Combs named Ward to succeed him. As highway commissioner, Ward secured millions of dollars in funding from both voters and the federal government to build a vast network of Interstates and other roads. Ward had previously been active with the Chamber of Commerce in Louisville and was instrumental in having Interstate 65 routed through downtown Louisville. He later said that decision was a mistake.

Ward was selected by Edward T. Breathitt as Breathitt's preferred successor as governor in 1967, but Ward was not a particularly skilled or gifted candidate for statewide office though he had been elected to both houses of the Kentucky State Legislature. He beat Happy Chandler and former Chandler ally Harry Lee Waterfield in the primary election. Chandler subsequently endorsed Louie Nunn, who had narrowly lost to Breathitt in 1963 and narrowly defeated Ward. Henry Ward was the first Democratic nominee for governor to lose a general election since 1943, a situation that did not occur again for the next 36 years, until Ben Chandler, Happy Chandler's grandson, lost in 2003 to Republican Ernie Fletcher.

Ward died on October 8, 2002.

Party political offices
Preceded by Edward T. Breathitt	Democratic nominee for Governor of Kentucky; 1967	Succeeded by Wendell H. Ford
