= John M. Robsion Jr. =

American politician (1904–1990)

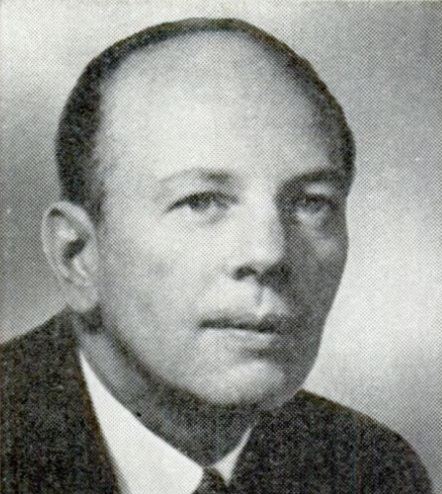

Member of the U.S. House of Representatives from Kentucky's 3rd district
- In office January 3, 1953 – January 3, 1959
- Preceded by: Thruston Ballard Morton
- Succeeded by: Frank W. Burke

Personal details
- Born: John Marshall Robsion Jr. August 28, 1904 Barbourville, Kentucky, U.S.
- Died: February 14, 1990 (aged 85) Fort Lauderdale, Florida, U.S.
- Resting place: Cave Hill Cemetery; Louisville, Kentucky, U.S.
- Party: Republican
- Parent: John M. Robsion
- Education: George Washington University; Georgetown University; National War College

Military service
- Allegiance: United States
- Branch/service: United States Army
- Years of service: 1942–1946
- Battles/wars: World War II

John Marshall Robsion Jr. (August 28, 1904 – February 14, 1990) was an American Republican politician who served as a United States representative from Kentucky from 1953 to 1959 and was the Republican nominee for Governor of Kentucky in 1959.

Robsion was born in Barbourville, Kentucky. He received his undergraduate and law degrees from George Washington University and also attended Georgetown University and the National War College. He worked as a congressional secretary from 1919 to 1928 and was admitted to the practice of law in 1926. Robsion briefly settled in Louisville in 1928. He returned to Washington to serve as chief of the law division for the United States Bureau of Pensions from 1929 to 1935. Afterward he returned to Louisville to practice law, serving as general counsel for the Kentucky Republican Party from 1938 to 1942. Robsion served in the United States Army during World War II from 1942 to 1946; he was posted to Africa, Italy, and Austria in that time. From 1946 to 1952 Robsion served as a circuit judge in Kentucky.

In 1952, incumbent Louisville Congressman Thruston B. Morton decided against seeking another term in that seat. Robsion sought it and was elected to the United States House of Representatives in 1952 from Kentucky's Third Congressional District (Louisville); he was re-elected to the House in 1954 and 1956. He sought re-election to the House in 1958 but was defeated by Democrat Frank W. Burke. Robsion did not sign the 1956 Southern Manifesto and voted in favor of the Civil Rights Act of 1957.

Robsion was the Republican nominee for Governor of Kentucky in 1959 but lost the election to Democrat Bert T. Combs. Combs won 516,549 votes (60.6%) to Robsion's 336,456 (39.4%); the 180,093-vote margin was then a record in a Kentucky state election, eclipsed overall only by Franklin D. Roosevelt's margin over Herbert Hoover in the 1932 presidential election.

After leaving Congress, Robsion returned to the practice of law. He was a resident of Louisville and Fort Lauderdale, Florida. Robsion died in Fort Lauderdale on February 14, 1990, and was buried at Cave Hill Cemetery in Louisville.

Robsion Park in Lyndon, Kentucky (Metro Louisville) is named for John M. Robsion Jr. and his wife Laura (Drane) Robsion, who died in 1980. Robsion donated the land for the 17-acre park in 1985.

U.S. House of Representatives
Preceded by Thruston B. Morton	Member of the U.S. House of Representatives from Kentucky's 3rd congressional district 1953–1959	Succeeded by Frank W. Burke
Party political offices
Preceded by Edwin R. Denney	Republican nominee for Governor of Kentucky; 1959	Succeeded by Louie B. Nunn
