= William Joseph Petrie =

American artist

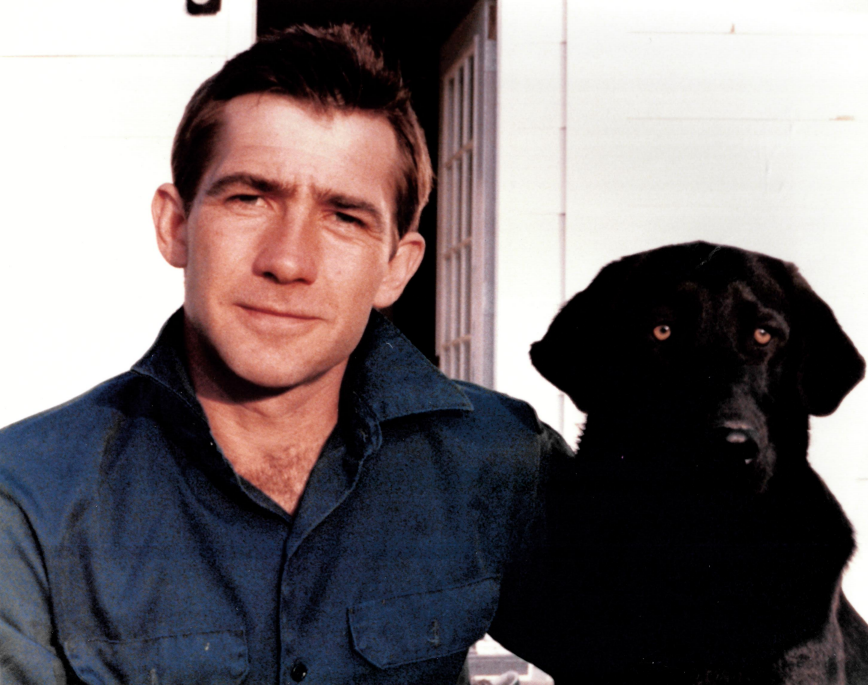
- Born: September 21, 1951; Covington, Kentucky, US
- Died: July 9, 1995 (aged 43); Lexington, Kentucky, US
- Occupations: Artist and tobacco farmer

William Joseph Petrie (September 21, 1951 – July 9, 1995) was an American artist and tobacco farmer based out of rural Kentucky.

== Education ==
In 1969, Petrie graduated from Grant County High School in Dry Ridge, Kentucky. Petrie earned a Bachelor of Science degree with a major in art from Northern Kentucky University on December 14, 1974. His senior graduate exhibition, In Dreams Awake, consisted of a collection of paintings on display January 2–16, 1975, on the 5th Floor Studio in the NKSC Science Building in Highland Heights, Kentucky.

== Career ==
Petrie painted a portrait of Kentucky politician Thelma Stovall around 1979. Petrie was said to be a fan of Stovall and met her during her 1979 run for Governor. The portrait is in the collection of the Kentucky Historical Society.

In 1976, Petrie was invited by the Grant County Women's Club to dedicate a mural at the courthouse to celebrate the nation's bicentennial. When interviewed about his work by the Kentucky Post, Petrie remarked that his paintings were "lyrical imagery” or "perhaps it could be called figurative impressionism."

Early on in his career, Petrie had ties with the Morris Museum of Art in Augusta, Georgia. In 1991, two of his paintings were on display in the museum shortly after Estill Curtis Pennington, the curator of the museum, saw his work. Currently, the museum has five of Petrie's paintings in their permanent collection: Dog Thief (1989), In the Operating Room (1993), Occasional Chair (undated), On the Royal Palm (1993), and Self-Portrait as a Cowboy (1991).

His work can also be seen in Pennington's published book, called The Southern Collection. In Pennington's foreword, he describes him as a "new" Southern Artist, and describes his work as boldly colored, exuberant works. He immediately got an appreciative following in the realm of Southern art, and had close ties with Augusta, Georgia for the remainder of his life.

Petrie was interviewed by author Frank Browning for his 1994 book, The Culture of Desire: Paradox and Perversity in Gay Lives Today. The book is a collection of discussions and interviews on gay culture in America at the time. In Chapter 8, "The Terror of Touching," Petrie is referred to as "Bill Fotti" to protect his identity.

== Personal life ==
Many individuals would come to live on Petrie's family tobacco farm in Grant County, Kentucky. The farm was said to be a "rural oasis" for people of all walks of life.

== Death and legacy ==
Petrie died on July 9, 1995, at the University of Kentucky hospital in Lexington, Kentucky.

In 1996, the Morris Museum exhibited Petrie's art in Stars for His Crown: A Memorial Exhibition for William Joseph Petrie. The museum published a book in conjunction with the exhibition. The book includes a six-page essay Estill Curtis Pennington and then images of the artwork.

In 2006, Tom Brown wrote the documentary In Dreams Awake, titled after Petrie's senior graduate exhibition, about Petrie's life and art. Primarily consisting of interviews with Petrie's friends and family, the film is described as a "heartfelt story of this prolific painter, tobacco farmer, political activist and passionate gay man living in the rural bluegrass of Kentucky." The film is available in full on YouTube.

After Petrie's death, Brown continued to live on the farm until he died in 2021. Before his passing, Tom had donated material to the Faulkner Morgan Archive (FMA), an LGBTQ archive based in Kentucky, in 2015 and 2017. After Brown's passing, FMA received more of Brown and Petrie's photos, papers, correspondence, and paintings. Petrie is documented by FMA for his life and career as a gay artist in Kentucky.
