= 1951 Kentucky gubernatorial election =

- November 6, 1951
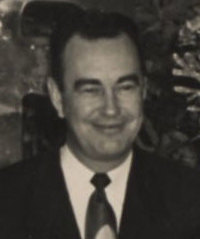

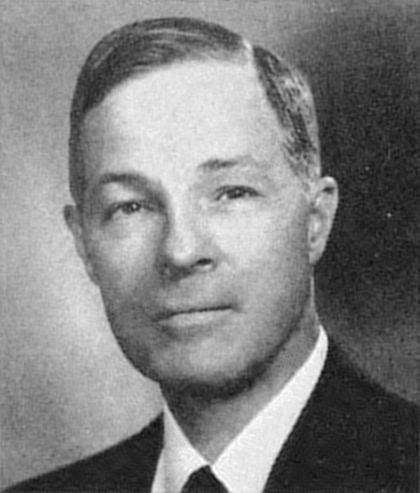
Nominee	Lawrence Wetherby	Eugene Siler
Party	Democratic	Republican
Popular vote	346,345	288,014
Percentage	54.60%	45.40%
- Wetherby: 50–60% 60–70% 70–80% 80–90% Siler: 50–60% 60–70% 70–80% 80–90%
Governor before election
Lawrence Wetherby
Democratic
Elected Governor
Lawrence Wetherby
Democratic

The 1951 Kentucky gubernatorial election was held on November 6, 1951. Incumbent Democrat Lawrence Wetherby defeated Republican nominee Eugene Siler with 54.60% of the vote.

== Primary elections ==
Primary elections were held on August 4, 1951.

=== Democratic primary ===
==== Candidates ====
- Lawrence Wetherby, incumbent Governor
- Howell W. Vincent, attorney
- Jesse N. R. Cecil

==== Results ====
Primary results by county Wetherby: 50%–60%; 60%–70%; 70%–80%; 80%–90%; 90%–100%; Vincent: 50%–60%; 60%–70%

Democratic primary results
Party	Candidate	Votes	%
Democratic	Lawrence Wetherby (incumbent)	228,582	75.07
Democratic	Howell W. Vincent	67,158	22.06
Democratic	Jesse N. R. Cecil	8,764	2.88
Total votes		304,504	100.00

=== Republican primary ===
==== Candidates ====
- Eugene Siler, Judge of the Kentucky Court of Appeals
- Wendell H. Meade, former U.S. Representative

==== Results ====
Primary results by county Siler: 50%–60%; 60%–70%; 70%–80%; 80%–90%; 90%–100%; Meade: 50%–60%; 60%–70%; 70%–80%; 80%–90%; 90%–100%

Republican primary results
Party	Candidate	Votes	%
Republican	Eugene Siler	62,143	58.43
Republican	Wendell H. Meade	44,212	41.57
Total votes		106,355	100.00

== General election ==
=== Candidates ===
- Lawrence Wetherby, Democratic
- Eugene Siler, Republican

=== Results ===
1951 Kentucky gubernatorial election
Party	Candidate	Votes	%	±%
Democratic	Lawrence W. Wetherby (incumbent)	346,345	54.60	−2.64
Republican	Eugene Siler	288,014	45.40	+2.93
Total votes		634,359	100.0	N/A
Democratic hold				
