= E. Leland Taylor =

American politician (1885–1948)

Edward Leland Taylor

45th Mayor of Louisville
- In office 1945–1948
- Preceded by: Wilson W. Wyatt
- Succeeded by: Charles R. Farnsley

Personal details
- Born: April 10, 1885 Knoxville, Tennessee, U.S.
- Died: February 16, 1948 (aged 62)
- Resting place: Cave Hill Cemetery; Louisville, Kentucky, U.S.
- Education: University of Virginia
- Occupation: Lawyer; politician

Edward Leland Taylor (April 10, 1885 – February 16, 1948) was mayor of Louisville, Kentucky, from 1945 to 1948.

== Life ==
E. Leland Taylor was born in Knoxville, Tennessee, and moved to Louisville with his family when he was 13. He graduated from Louisville Male High School and the University of Virginia, where he received a law degree in 1912. He practiced law in Louisville but eventually worked in real estate. During his term, he was able to secure land for the expansion of the city and its highway system.

He is buried at Cave Hill Cemetery.

Political offices
Preceded by Wilson W. Wyatt	Mayor of Louisville, Kentucky; December 1, 1945 – February 16, 1948	Succeeded by Charles R. Farnsley
