= Bert Combs =

American judge and politician (1911–1991)

Bertram Combs
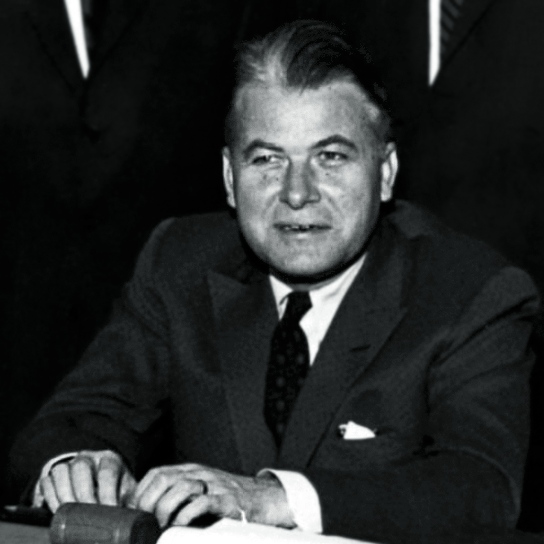
- Combs in 1960

Judge of the United States Court of Appeals for the Sixth Circuit
- In office April 5, 1967 – June 5, 1970
- Appointed by: Lyndon B. Johnson
- Preceded by: Shackelford Miller Jr.
- Succeeded by: W. Wallace Kent

50th Governor of Kentucky
- In office December 8, 1959 – December 10, 1963
- Lieutenant: Wilson W. Wyatt
- Preceded by: Happy Chandler
- Succeeded by: Ned Breathitt

Justice of the Kentucky Court of Appeals
- In office April 24, 1951 – February 1, 1955
- Preceded by: Roy Helm
- Succeeded by: Astor Hogg

Personal details
- Born: Bertram Thomas Combs; August 13, 1911 Manchester, Kentucky, U.S.
- Died: December 4, 1991 (aged 80) Powell County, Kentucky, U.S.
- Resting place: Beech Creek Cemetery; Manchester, Kentucky, U.S.
- Party: Democratic
- Spouses: Mabel Hall (m. 1937–1969) Helen Rechtin (m. 1969–1986) Sara Walter (m. 1988–1991)
- Children: Lois Combs Weinberg
- Education: University of Kentucky (LLB)

Military service
- Allegiance: United States
- Branch/service: United States Army
- Years of service: 1943–1946
- Rank: Captain
- Battles/wars: World War II
- Awards: Bronze Star Medal; Military Merit Medal of Philippines

Bertram Thomas Combs (August 13, 1911 – December 4, 1991) was an American jurist and liberal politician from the Commonwealth of Kentucky. After serving on the Kentucky Court of Appeals, he was elected the 50th governor of Kentucky in 1959 on his second run for the office. Following his gubernatorial term, he was appointed to serve as a United States circuit judge of the United States Court of Appeals for the Sixth Circuit by President Lyndon B. Johnson, serving from 1967 to 1970.

Combs rose from poverty in his native Clay County to earn a law degree from the University of Kentucky and open a law practice in Prestonsburg. He was decorated for prosecuting Japanese war criminals before military tribunals following World War II, then returned to Kentucky and his law practice. In 1951, Governor Lawrence Wetherby appointed him to fill a vacancy on the Kentucky Court of Appeals. Later that year, he was elected to a full term on the court, defeating former governor and judge Simeon S. Willis. Kentucky's Democratic Party had split into two factions by 1955 when Earle C. Clements, the leader of one faction, chose Combs to challenge former governor and U.S. Senator A. B. "Happy" Chandler, who headed the other, in the upcoming gubernatorial primary.

Chandler, who went on to reclaim the governorship, had promised that he would not need to raise taxes to meet the state's financial obligations, but ultimately he did so. In 1959, Combs was elected governor, defeating Lieutenant Governor Harry Lee Waterfield, Chandler's choice to succeed him in office, in the primary. Early in his term, Combs secured passage of a three-percent sales tax to pay a bonus to the state's military veterans. Knowing a tax of one percent would have been sufficient, he used the excess revenue to enact a system of reforms, including expansion of the state's highway and state park systems. He also devoted much of the surplus to education.

Following his term in office, Combs was appointed to the United States Court of Appeals for the Sixth Circuit by President Johnson. He served for three years before resigning and running for governor again in 1971. He lost in the Democratic primary to Wendell Ford, his former executive secretary. In 1984, Combs agreed to represent sixty-six of the state's poor school districts in a lawsuit challenging the state's system of financing public education. The suit, Rose v. Council for Better Education, resulted in the Kentucky Supreme Court declaring the state's entire system of public schools unconstitutional. In response, the Kentucky General Assembly drafted a sweeping education measure known as the Kentucky Education Reform Act in 1991. On December 3, 1991, Combs was caught in a flash flood while driving and was killed.

== Early life ==
Bert Combs was born in the Town Branch section of Manchester, Kentucky on August 13, 1911; he was one of seven children of Stephen Gibson and Martha (Jones) Combs. Combs's father Stephen, a part-time logger and farmer, was active in local politics, despite being a Democrat in a county where a large majority of residents were Republicans. His mother was a teacher, and she impressed upon her children the importance of a good education. Bert's first school was the two-room Beech Creek grade school. When he reached the seventh grade, his parents sent him and his sister to Oneida Baptist Institute in nearby Oneida because its school term was 8 to 9 months long, as opposed to the 5- to 6-month terms at Beech Creek. Later, Combs and his sister began riding a donkey every day to Clay County High School. Combs excelled academically and skipped some grades, graduating as valedictorian of his class in 1927 at age 15.

Unable to afford college tuition, Combs worked at a local drug store and did small jobs for various residents of his community. In 1929, his mother arranged for him to work at a coal company in Williamsburg and attend Cumberland College (then a junior college). The coal company job did not materialize, but Combs was able to afford three semesters at Cumberland by sweeping floors and firing furnaces in campus buildings. In mid-1930, he began working as a clerk for the state highway department. This was one of several patronage jobs that were usually awarded by the governor, but the Democratically controlled state legislature had stripped Republican Governor Flem D. Sampson of his statutory appointment powers, giving them instead to a three-man highway commission composed of Democratic Lieutenant Governor James Breathitt, Democratic Highway Commissioner Ben Johnson, and Dan Talbott. This allowed Combs, a Democrat, to secure the position.

Combs worked for the highway department for three years in order to earn enough money to attend the University of Kentucky College of Law in Lexington. While at the university, he was managing editor of the Kentucky Law Journal. In 1937 he graduated second in his class, earning a Bachelor of Laws degree and qualifying for the Order of the Coif, a national honor society for the top ten percent of graduating law students. He was admitted to the bar, and returned to Manchester to begin practicing law. It was also in 1937 that Combs married Mabel Hall, with whom he had two children, Lois Ann Combs and Thomas "Tommy" George Combs.

== Early legal career and service in World War II ==
Of his law practice in Manchester, Combs later noted: "I had too many kinfolks and friends in Manchester, and they all expected me to handle things as a favor ... Then they'd get their feelings hurt if I charged them. I was taking in a lot of cases, but not sending out many bills." In 1938, Combs accepted an offer from a law school classmate named LeRoy Combs (no relation) to join his father and uncle's law firm in Prestonsburg. Prestonsburg was closer to his wife's home in Knott County. Combs' son Tommy had a form of intellectual disability, the result of an injury sustained at birth. After moving to Prestonsburg, Combs started a class for people with intellectual disability, in part so Tommy could attend the class.

On December 22, 1943, Combs enlisted as a private in the U.S. Army for service in World War II. He received his basic training at Fort Knox and participated in the Volunteer Officer Candidate Program, which would have allowed him to attend Officer Candidate School (OCS) immediately after basic training. Instead, he was briefly assigned to teach cartography at the Aberdeen Proving Ground in Aberdeen, Maryland before completing OCS in Ann Arbor, Michigan, joining the Judge Advocate General's Corps, and attaining the rank of captain. On July 1, 1945, he was sent to the South Pacific. He served as chief of the War Crimes Investigating Department under General Douglas MacArthur in the Philippine Islands, conducting tribunals for Japanese war criminals. Upon his discharge in 1946, he was awarded the Bronze Star and the Military Merit Medal of the Philippines.

After the war, Combs returned to Prestonsburg, forming the law firm of Howard and Combs with J. Woodford Howard as his partner. He served as president of the Junior Bar Association of Kentucky in 1946 and 1947. Combs often represented coal companies in workers' compensation cases against Carl D. Perkins, later a U.S. Representative, who served as legal counsel for the mine workers.

== Political career ==
Combs began his political career with his election to the office of city attorney in Prestonsburg in 1950. Later that year, Governor Lawrence Wetherby appointed him to fill a vacancy in the office of Commonwealth's Attorney for Kentucky's 31st Judicial District. Combs announced, however, that he would serve only until a new election could be held. In April 1951, Governor Wetherby appointed Combs to fill a vacancy on the Kentucky Court of Appeals caused by the death of Judge Roy Helm. Later that year, he sought a full eight-year term on the court. His opponent was Simeon S. Willis, a popular former Republican governor who had previously sat on the court. Combs won the election by a vote of 73,298 to 69,379. In George Robinson's oral history, Combs attributed his victory to Willis's advanced age (68) and the fact that many of Willis' supporters assumed that their candidate would win and did not vote.

=== 1955 gubernatorial race ===
A. B. "Happy" Chandler, who had served as Kentucky's governor from 1935 to 1939 and was a leader of a faction of the state's Democratic Party, announced his intention to seek a second term in 1955. Members of the anti-Chandler faction scrambled to find a candidate to oppose him. The most likely candidate was Emerson "Doc" Beauchamp, the sitting lieutenant governor, but Beauchamp was not a good campaigner and his ties to Logan County – where politics were dominated by sometimes-corrupt political bosses – gave the anti-Chandler faction pause. Instead, the leader of the faction, former governor and sitting U.S. Senator Earle C. Clements, selected Combs as the faction's nominee, and Combs resigned from his position on the Court of Appeals to enter the race.

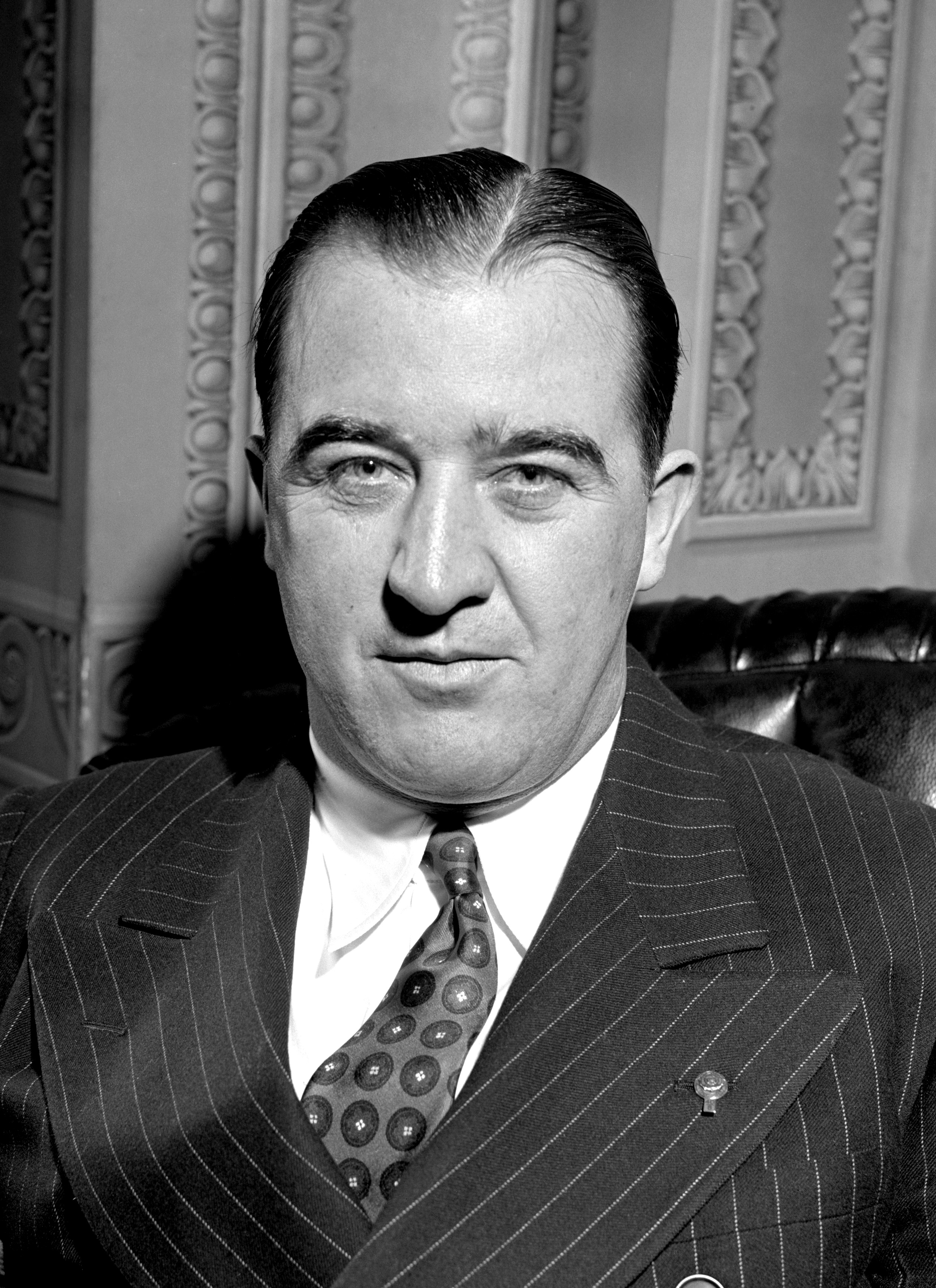
Happy Chandler, Combs' opponent in the 1955 gubernatorial race

In Combs' first speech of the primary campaign, he admitted that the state needed to raise $25 million ($300 million in 2025 dollars) in new revenue and that a sales tax should be considered. Chandler, the more experienced politician, attacked Combs for this suggestion, maintaining that an experienced governor like himself would not need to raise taxes to meet the state's obligations. Combs' speech was also attacked as dry and uninspiring, partly because he read it verbatim from prepared notes. "And you said I couldn't give a speech," Doc Beauchamp later complained to Clements. Hugh Morris, chief of the Louisville Courier-Journal's Frankfort bureau, commented that "Combs opened and closed his campaign on the same night".

With little but Combs' inexperience to run against, Chandler portrayed Combs as a pawn of former governors Clements and Wetherby, whom he derisively nicknamed "Clementine" and "Wetherbine". He accused both administrations of wasteful spending, specifically attacking the construction of the Kentucky Turnpike and Freedom Hall as unnecessary expenditures. Some of Chandler's attacks were more personal in nature; he charged that when Clements was governor, he spent $20,000 ($240,373 in 2025 dollars) on a new rug for his office, and that Wetherby had used African mahogany to panel his office, instead of "good, honest Kentucky wood". Though receipts later showed that carpeting for the entire first floor of the capitol had cost only $2,700 and that Wetherby's paneling had been purchased from and installed by a Kentucky contractor, Chandler's charges remained effective at keeping the Combs campaign on the defensive.

Two weeks before the primary, Combs was endorsed by former Vice-President and native Kentuckian Alben W. Barkley, but Combs felt the endorsement came too late to be much help. Chandler defeated Combs in the primary by a vote of 259,875 to 241,754 and went on to win his second term as governor. Combs returned to Prestonsburg, set up a savings and loan company, and re-established his law practice. During the four years of Chandler's term, Combs accepted a number of speaking engagements, but otherwise remained out of the public eye. Meanwhile, the state's need for funds compelled Chandler to raise the state sales tax and other taxes, despite his campaign promises not to do so. Consequently, Chandler lost credibility and Combs gained a reputation as a courageous, forthright, and honest politician for having acknowledged the state's financial need during the campaign.

=== 1959 gubernatorial race ===
Barred by the state constitution from seeking consecutive terms, Chandler endorsed his lieutenant governor, Harry Lee Waterfield, to succeed him. Wilson Wyatt, who had managed Adlai Stevenson's presidential campaign in 1952, was the first anti-Chandler candidate to declare his intention to seek the governorship in the 1959 election, doing so on April 9, 1958. Wyatt received several endorsements from leaders in Jefferson County, which contained his home city of Louisville and was vehemently anti-Chandler. Four days after Wyatt's announcement, Combs declared that he would again seek the office, and he was endorsed by Clements a week later. For the remainder of 1958, the anti-Chandler faction's support remained split between Wyatt and Combs. In January 1959, Clements held an all-night meeting at the Standiford Airport Hotel in Louisville in which he brokered a deal whereby Combs would run for governor and Wyatt for lieutenant governor. Clements promised Wyatt his support in future political races.

In the primary campaign against Waterfield, Combs attacked the Chandler administration. He was especially critical of a rumor which held that Chandler had placed a two-percent assessment on state employees' salaries and had stored the funds in a Cuban bank so they could not be traced. According to the rumor, when Fidel Castro seized power during the Cuban Revolution, the funds Chandler had deposited in Cuba were lost. Chandler countered on Waterfield's behalf with charges that Combs was a "Clements parrot". Combs succeeded in uniting the anti-Chandler base, and defeated Waterfield by 25,000 votes; he went on to win the governorship that fall, defeating Republican nominee John M. Robsion, Jr. by 180,093 votes. The victory margin was a record for a governor's race in Kentucky, and was the second highest margin of victory for any election in the state, trailing only Franklin D. Roosevelt's 185,858-vote victory over Herbert Hoover in 1932. Combs was the first governor elected from Eastern Kentucky since Flem D. Sampson in 1927, and was the first veteran of World War II to hold the office.

=== Governor of Kentucky ===
One of Combs' first official actions as governor was to call a special session of the legislature on December 19, 1959, to consider revising the state's constitution, which had been in effect since 1891. Calling a constitutional convention required that the General Assembly approve putting the issue of a convention on the ballot in two consecutive legislative sessions. The call then had to be approved by Kentucky voters. Despite near-universal agreement by legal scholars that the constitution was badly in need of updating, Kentucky voters had rejected calls for a constitutional convention in 1931 and 1947, and had only approved 19 amendments since 1891. Combs wanted to address the issue during his four-year term, hence the haste in calling the special legislative session. The General Assembly easily approved the call for a convention during the special legislative session and again during the subsequent regular legislative session in 1960. Combs signed the measure, and the question of a constitutional revision was put on the ballot in November 1960, when Kentucky voters defeated it by a margin of almost 18,000 votes. This was the closest Kentucky has come to replacing the 1891 constitution, which remains in effect today.

=== Kentucky's first billion-dollar budget ===
During the campaign, Combs had advocated a progressive platform that included increased funding for education, highways, parks, industry, and airports. Soon after his election, he won approval for a three-percent sales tax to pay a bonus to military veterans, although he could have funded the bonuses with a one-percent tax. He had asked for the larger tax in order to fund his other priorities. As a result of the sales tax, Combs presided over the state's first billion-dollar budget. One study showed that Kentucky doubled its per capita expenditures between 1957 and 1962, growing its appropriations faster than any other state. Combs held large public relations events for each tax-funded project that was completed, declaring in dedication speeches that the sales tax had made the project possible.

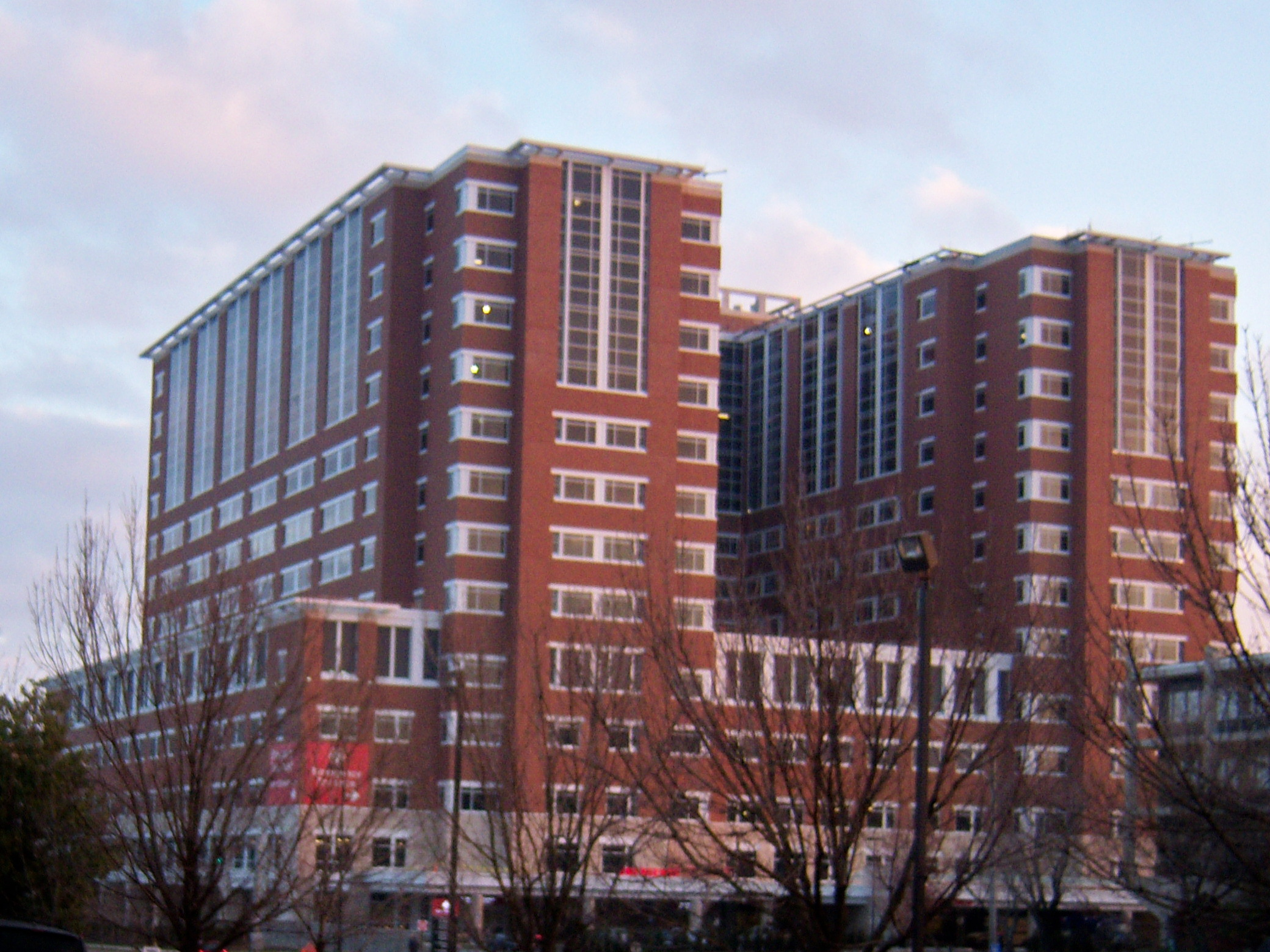
The Albert B. Chandler Hospital was completed with funds from Combs' first biennial budget.

In 1960, Kentucky had one of the highest dropout rates in the nation, and ranked second only to Arkansas in the number of one-room schools. Fewer than half of the state's high school graduates attended college. Many teachers educated in Kentucky sought higher salaries available in other states. Combs' biennial budget, passed by the General Assembly in 1960, used money from the new sales tax to increase school funds by fifty percent and establish the state community college system (now the Kentucky Community and Technical College System). It also increased funding for free textbooks by more than $3 million and allocated another $2 million to vocational education. It allocated over $5 million to the state universities for new buildings and another $10.5 million to fund completion of the Albert B. Chandler Hospital, a facility at the University of Kentucky named in honor of Combs' political foe.

The state's roads were in poor condition when Combs became governor. The Automotive Safety Foundation found that two-thirds of Kentucky's federal roads were below standards for existing traffic demands. It further found that twenty percent of the state's major city streets were inadequate, that another fifty-five percent would soon be inadequate due to increasing traffic, and that half of the state's secondary roads were unfit for modern industrial traffic. To address these problems, Combs issued $100 million in bonds to increase funding for highways, appointing Earle Clements as state highway commissioner to oversee the correction of the road issues. One of the new roads, the Mountain Parkway, which connected Combs' native Eastern Kentucky to Central Kentucky, was later renamed the Bert T. Combs Mountain Parkway in Combs' honor. Because of generous funding in Combs' budget, Kentucky finished its portions of the Interstate Highway System much sooner than surrounding states such as Virginia and Tennessee.

Combs also won approval of a $10 million bond issue to benefit the state parks, which had poor lodging and few amenities. Combs combined the bond issue with $10 million in revenue bonds and effected major renovations at all 26 of the state's parks. Though his dreams of seeing privately owned tourist facilities spring up around the parks did not come to fruition, out-of-state tourism to Kentucky more than doubled during his administration, accounting for about sixty percent of state park visitors and fifty-three percent of the overnight visitations to the parks. Journalist John Ed Pearce recounts that Kentucky natives began to complain that they could not get reservations in the parks during peak seasons and called for limitations on the number of out-of-state visitors or a reservation system that favored Kentuckians, although nothing was done to address these complaints.

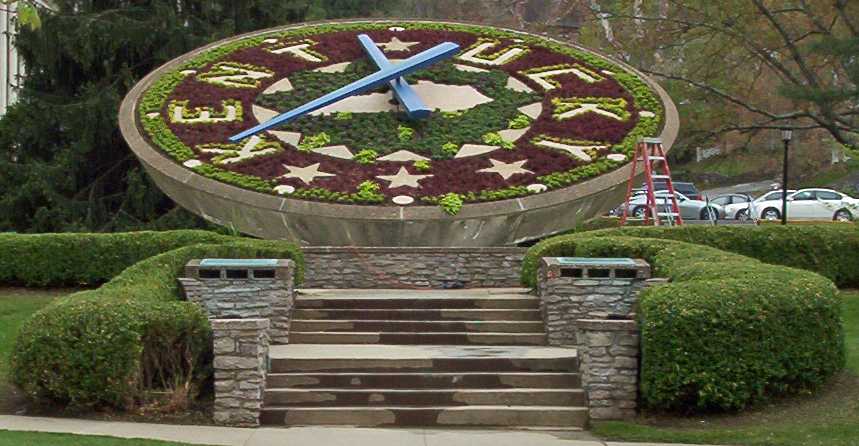
The floral clock in Frankfort

On April 10, 1961, Combs appropriated $50,000 from the governor's contingency fund to construct a floral clock on the lawn of the state capitol. Combs had seen a similar clock in Edinburgh, Scotland, and believed it would be a colorful addition to the capitol grounds. In a subsequent gubernatorial campaign, Happy Chandler mocked the clock, declaring "Well, they don't say it's half past 2 in Frankfort anymore. They say it's two petunias past the jimson weed." Chandler's derision became the minority view in time, however; according to John Ed Pearce, the clock became one of the most talked-about and visited tourist attractions in the state and the most visited place in Frankfort.

=== Ethical reforms ===
Combs created a merit system for state government workers, ensuring that officials could not be hired or fired for political reasons. This provision attracted more well-qualified people to public service careers. Such careers were made even more attractive when, in 1962, the state courts declared that the salaries of state employees, the amounts of which were specified in the state constitution, could be adjusted for inflation. Combs demanded that state employees stick strictly to the rules governing their offices. In one instance, Combs ordered a state audit of Carter County school superintendent Heman McGuire, who was known to use his office for political gain. While Combs did not have the authority to remove McGuire directly, the audit showed McGuire's misappropriation of funds and abuse of power. The state school board investigated these findings and removed the county school board members from office; the replacement board members then ousted McGuire.

In 1961, a group of citizens from Newport asked Combs for help in cracking down on crime in their city. Just across the Ohio River from Cincinnati, Newport had gained a reputation as a haven for prostitution, gambling, and illegal alcohol. After receiving an affidavit from the citizens, Combs sent agents from the department of Alcoholic Beverage Control to the city. They cited six bars for violating laws governing liquor sales, and instructed Attorney General John B. Breckinridge to prosecute four local officials for failure to enforce the laws. When allegations of civil rights violations in a related trial surfaced, U.S. Attorney General Robert F. Kennedy sent federal Justice Department officials to Newport, prompting the resignation of the sheriff and a circuit judge. Two other local officials were barred from office for four years.

Some of Combs' crackdowns on corruption were politically damaging, including the so-called "truck deal". In 1961, Kyle Vance, a reporter for the Louisville Courier-Journal reported that the state was about to purchase some dump trucks from one of Combs' former campaign officials for $346,800, far more than they were worth, according to the report. The newspaper, long antagonistic toward Highway Commissioner Clements, painted the deal as a political payoff orchestrated by the highway commissioner. In the interest of preserving his reputation as an honest governor, Combs canceled the proposed deal. This angered Clements, who took Combs' action as a public rebuke. The incident caused a rift between him and Combs that never fully healed; Clements later resigned, ostensibly to work on the presidential campaign of his friend and former Senate colleague, Lyndon B. Johnson. Thereafter, he worked against Combs at every opportunity, even joining with Happy Chandler to ensure Wilson Wyatt's defeat in his 1962 race for the Senate, in a reversal of his previous promise to support Wyatt.

Combs also formed the state's first Human Rights Commission and ordered the desegregation of all public accommodations in Kentucky. The latter action was commended in a letter to Combs from President John F. Kennedy. In 1961, Combs was awarded an honorary Doctor of Laws degree from the University of Kentucky, and on February 17, 1962, he received an award from Keep America Beautiful for his work on cleaning up Kentucky's highways, including securing passage of a bill requiring that auto junkyards near major roadways be screened from view by fences.

Among Combs' other accomplishments as governor were requiring voting machines in state elections and passage of a law making the assessment of state employees for political campaign funds a felony. At the end of his term, Combs backed Edward T. Breathitt to succeed him as governor. Breathitt defeated Happy Chandler in the Democratic primary, then went on to defeat Republican Louie B. Nunn in the general election. It was the only time in the 20th century that a Kentucky governor's preferred successor won election.

=== Later political career ===
Following his term as governor, Combs returned to his legal practice. He was a charter member and chairman of the Eastern Kentucky Historical Society and a trustee at Campbellsville College. In 1963, he was awarded the Joseph P. Kennedy International Award for "outstanding contributions and leadership in the field of mental retardations." He was named Kentucky's outstanding attorney in 1964, and in the spring of that year, he served as a visiting professor in the Political Science Department at the University of Massachusetts. In 1965, he was inducted into the University of Kentucky's Hall of Distinguished Alumni.

In August 1964, Combs declined a nomination to the bench of the United States District Court for the Western District of Kentucky. During the administration of Combs' successor, Ned Breathitt, Republicans gained strength within the state behind the leadership of Louie Nunn, Marlow Cook, and William O. Cowger. The Republican rise, coupled with Democratic factionalism, prompted many prominent state Democrats to approach Combs about seeking another term as governor. Combs wavered on whether to seek the Democratic nomination until October 1966, when he publicly declared his support for Henry Ward. In a later interview with historian George W. Robinson, Combs recounted that he "would have run at that time except for a personal family situation". Ward handily defeated his primary opponents, Happy Chandler and Harry Lee Waterfield, but lost in the general election to Louie Nunn.

On January 16, 1967, President Lyndon Johnson nominated Combs to the United States Court of Appeals for the Sixth Circuit, replacing the deceased Shackelford Miller Jr., and the Senate confirmed the nomination on April 5, 1967, and Combs received his commission the same day. Because of the rules of the federal judiciary, Combs had to liquidate his business and banking assets and severely restrict contact with many of his political acquaintances to avoid potential conflicts of interest with cases he might adjudicate on the Court of Appeals. He expressed frustration that the cases that came before the court were frequently appealed to the Supreme Court, which often gave little weight to the opinions rendered by the Court of Appeals. Consequently, he resigned from the court on June 5, 1970, and joined the Louisville law firm of Tarrant, Combs, and Bullitt (later Wyatt, Tarrant & Combs).

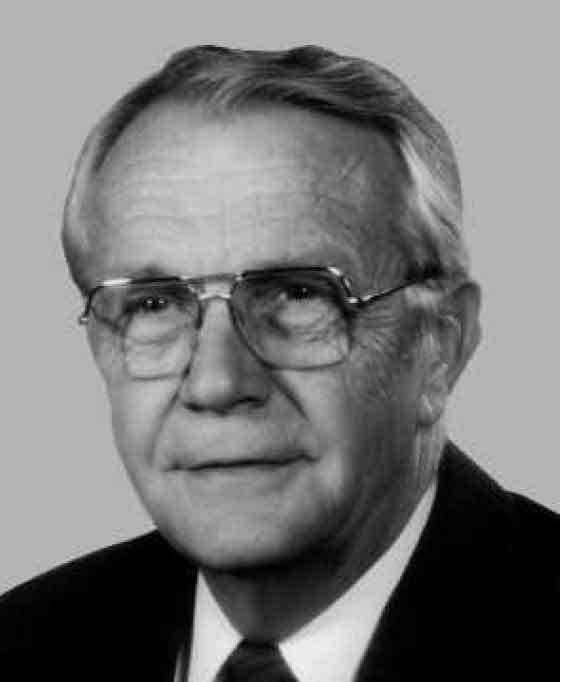
Wendell Ford defeated Combs in the 1971 Democratic gubernatorial primary.

With the end of Governor Nunn's term approaching, a rivalry for leadership of the state Democratic party developed between Lieutenant Governor Wendell H. Ford, who had served as Combs' chief administrative assistant during his gubernatorial term, and Julian M. Carroll, speaker of the state House of Representatives. As soon as Combs resigned from the Court of Appeals, Democratic leaders began asking him to seek the party's gubernatorial nomination in 1971, uniting the party behind him rather than splintering it between Ford and Carroll. In June 1970, Carroll announced his intent to run for lieutenant governor, indicating that he would like to serve under Combs as governor. While Combs considered whether or not to seek the nomination, Ford declared his candidacy. Days later, Combs also entered the race.

Combs and Ford advocated similar platforms, but Combs encouraged the state's teachers to become more politically active, negotiating higher salaries and better benefits for themselves, while Ford was critical of educators becoming involved in politics and only advocated more spending on education if the state could afford it. In his oral history of Combs, Robinson noted that Ford, thirteen years Combs' junior, "came across better on television" and that many voters in the state felt that Combs must have had ulterior motives in leaving a judgeship that paid a salary of $42,500 for the governorship, which paid only $30,000 annually. Catholics were also upset that Combs had married his second wife, Helen Clark Rechtin, just forty-three days after his divorce from Mabel Hall was finalized on July 18, 1969. (Combs and Hall had been separated for five years prior to finalizing the divorce.) Despite these handicaps, many Democrats assumed that Combs, the proven candidate, would easily defeat the newcomer Ford, and fewer than one-third of registered Democrats voted in the primary. In what the Courier-Journal called a "stunning defeat", Ford defeated Combs in the Democratic primary and went on to win the governorship.

== Later life ==
After the 1971 primary, Combs retired from politics and resumed his law practice, maintaining an office in Frankfort. He moved to Louisville, becoming the partner of John Tarrant in Tarrant, Combs and Bullitt, and then in Wyatt, Tarrant and Combs, with Wilson Wyatt. He continued to represent large coal companies, drawing the ire of local environmentalist and author Harry M. Caudill, who asserted that Combs claimed to represent the powerless while actually representing the powerful. He was active in the formation of the Rural Housing and Development Corporation and served on the Council on Higher Education. He also served on President Jimmy Carter's General Advisory Committee on Arms Control and Disarmament.

Combs' second marriage ended in divorce on May 19, 1986. On December 30, 1988, he married his law assistant, Sara M. Walter.

=== Rose v. Council for Better Education ===
On October 3, 1984, leaders of the Council for Better Education asked Combs to represent them in a legal challenge to Kentucky's school financing system, which it claimed unfairly discriminated against poorer school systems in the state. Combs felt the lawsuit would be difficult to win and could cause retaliation against his other clients by state government officials. He needed this lawsuit "about like a hog needs a side saddle", he would later claim; nevertheless, he agreed to take the case if the council could convince thirty to forty percent of the state's school boards to join it. The Council eventually persuaded 66 of the 177 school boards to join. Working pro bono, Combs assembled a legal team that included Kern Alexander, a Kentucky native and education law expert who was named president of Western Kentucky University in November 1985.

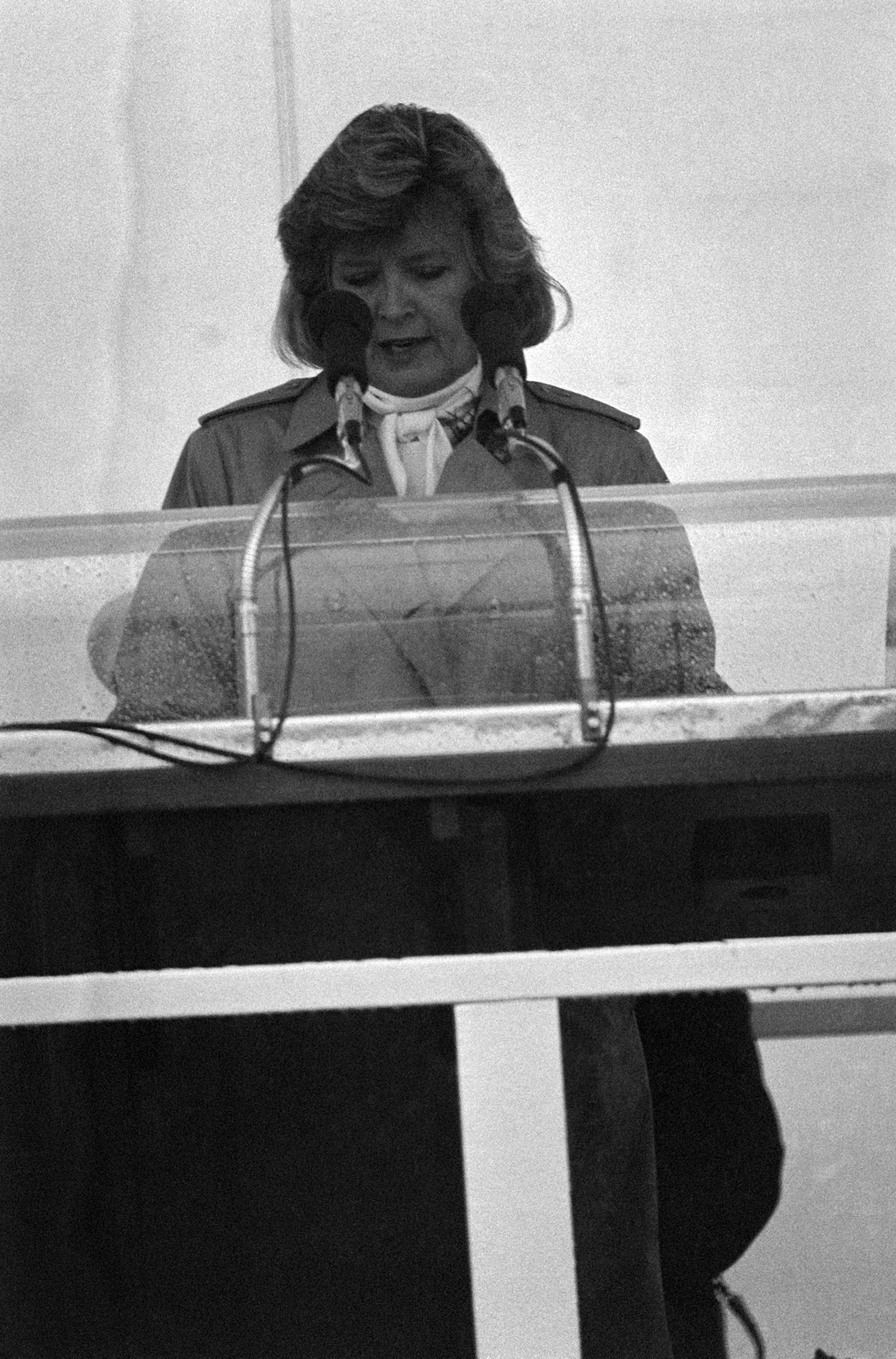
Gov. Martha Layne Collins' education reforms were not substantial enough to prevent the Council for Better Education from suing the state.

Combs first attempted to gain legislative concessions that might preclude the need for a lawsuit. Governor Martha Layne Collins proposed an education reform agenda and called the legislature into special session in mid-1985 to consider it. The legislature enacted a corporate income tax to raise $300 million aimed at reducing class sizes, but the council was seeking more fundamental structural changes to the system and deemed the increased funds insufficient to equalize its members' standing with that of more affluent school districts. Dissatisfied with the results of the special session, Combs and the Council filed their suit, Rose v. Council for Better Education, on November 20, 1985. The governor, state superintendent, state treasurer, leaders of both houses of the state legislature, and every member of the state board of education were named as defendants in the case.

The defendants' request for summary judgment dismissing the case was not granted, and the trial began in Franklin circuit court on August 4, 1987. During the trial, a new state superintendent was elected. The new superintendent, John Brock, announced that his office would drop its defense and side with the council, a major blow to the defense. On May 31, 1988, Judge Ray Corns found in favor of the plaintiffs, declaring that the school finance system was "unconstitutional and discriminatory". Two days later, the defense announced that it would appeal the ruling to the Kentucky Supreme Court, but recently elected governor Wallace G. Wilkinson refused to join the appeal and supported Judge Corns' ruling.

Opening arguments in the appeal began December 7, 1988. The defense argued that the Council lacked standing to bring the suit; Combs rebutted this argument and cited statistics that ranked Kentucky as the most illiterate state in the nation to show how inequitable financing had adversely affected the state's students. On June 8, 1989, the court handed down a 3–2 ruling declaring Kentucky's entire public school system unconstitutional and giving the General Assembly until the end of their next legislative session, which would convene in January 1990, to create a replacement. Commenting on the ruling, Combs said "My clients asked for a thimble-full, and [instead] they got a bucket-full".

The court set out nine minimum standards. In response to the court's ruling, the General Assembly passed the 1990 Kentucky Education Reform Act, which radically altered Kentucky's school system, providing mechanisms to equalize funding among school districts and implementing some of the toughest accountability standards in the United States. Of the legislature's actions, Combs opined "Kentucky has now, by reason of this legislation, decided to become educated—and we have embarked on a crusade for that purpose. Don't be surprised if we should within the next decade develop a first class, world-wide educational system."

=== Death and legacy ===
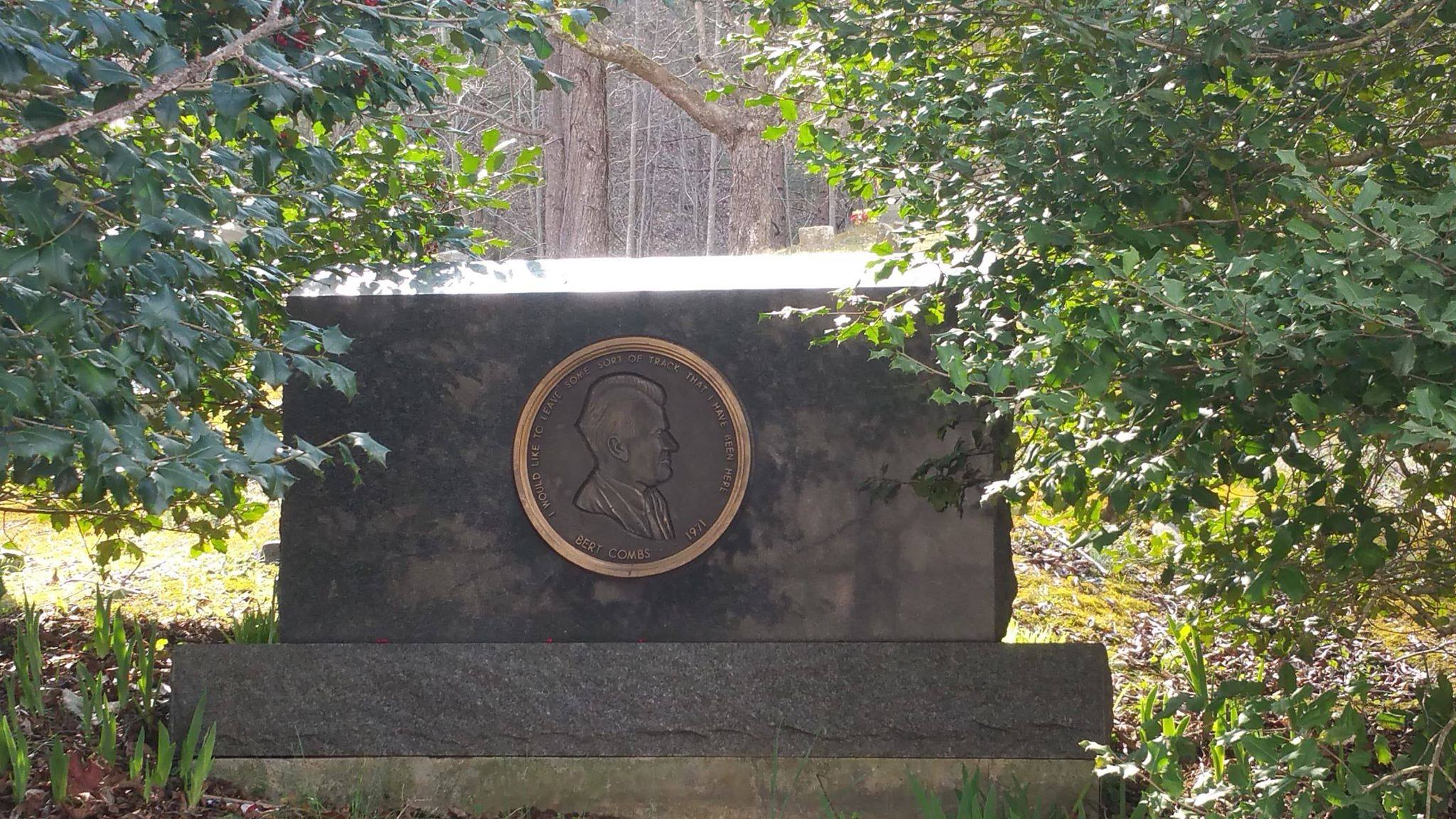
Grave marker of Bert Combs in Beech Creek Cemetery

On December 3, 1991, Combs left his law office during a flash flood about 5:30 pm. He was reported missing hours later, and the following day, he was found dead of hypothermia just downstream from his car in the Red River near Rosslyn, in Powell County. He was buried in the Beech Creek Cemetery in Manchester.

In addition to the Bert T. Combs Mountain Parkway, Bert T. Combs Lake, an artificial lake constructed in 1963 in Clay County, is named in Combs' honor. On April 20, 2007, two life-sized statues of Combs were dedicated—one in Stanton, near the parkway that bears his name, and another in the county courthouse in Prestonsburg. Combs' widow, Sara Walter Combs, became the first woman to serve on the Kentucky Supreme Court in 1993 and thereafter sat on the Kentucky Court of Appeals, where she was chief judge from 2004 to 2010, also a first for a woman.

The Bert Combs Building at Morehead State University in Morehead, Kentucky, has also been named in his honor.

Combs' daughter, Lois (Combs) Weinberg, unsuccessfully challenged incumbent Mitch McConnell for his Senate seat in 2002.

Political offices
Preceded by Happy Chandler	Governor of Kentucky; 1959–1963	Succeeded by Edward T. Breathitt
Party political offices
Preceded by Happy Chandler	Democratic nominee for Governor of Kentucky; 1959	Succeeded by Edward T. Breathitt
Legal offices
Preceded by Shackelford Miller Jr.	Judge of the United States Court of Appeals for the Sixth Circuit; 1967–1970	Succeeded by W. Wallace Kent
