= Wilson W. Wyatt =

American politician (1905–1996)

Wilson Wyatt
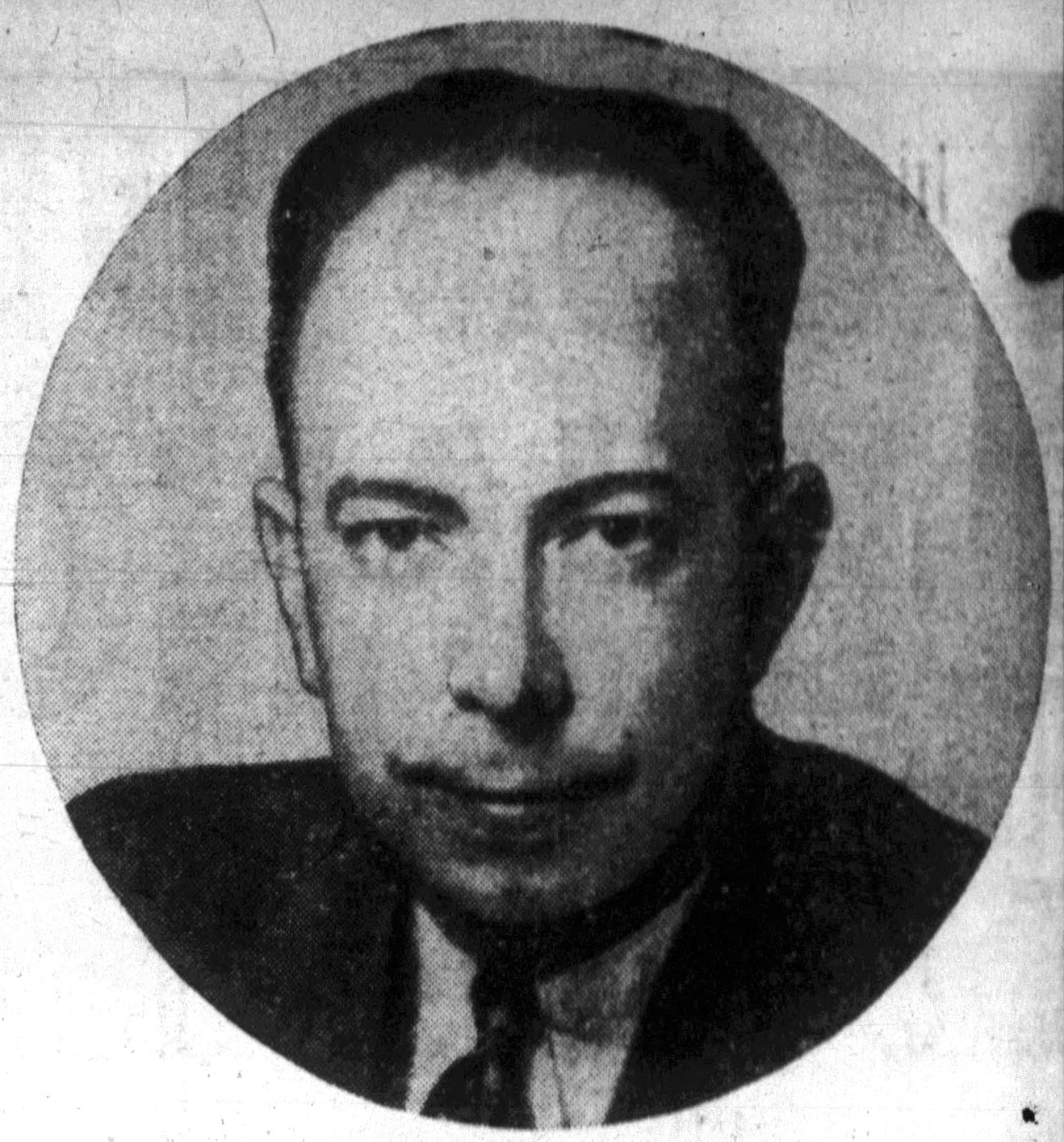

43rd Lieutenant Governor of Kentucky
- In office December 8, 1959 – December 10, 1963
- Governor: Bert T. Combs
- Preceded by: Harry Waterfield
- Succeeded by: Harry Waterfield

Administrator of the National Housing Agency
- In office January 26, 1946 – December 12, 1946
- President: Harry S. Truman
- Preceded by: John Blandford Jr.
- Succeeded by: Raymond Foley

17th President of the National League of Cities
- In office 1945
- Preceded by: Herbert Olson
- Succeeded by: Earl Riley

44th Mayor of Louisville
- In office 1941–1945
- Preceded by: Joseph D. Scholtz
- Succeeded by: E. Leland Taylor

Personal details
- Born: Wilson Watkins Wyatt; November 21, 1905 Louisville, Kentucky, U.S.
- Died: June 11, 1996 (aged 90) Louisville, Kentucky, U.S.
- Resting place: Cave Hill Cemetery
- Party: Democratic
- Education: University of Louisville (BA, LLB)

Wilson Watkins Wyatt (November 21, 1905 – June 11, 1996) was an American politician who served as mayor of Louisville, Kentucky, from 1941 to 1945 and as the 43rd lieutenant governor of Kentucky from 1959 to 1963. He was a member of the Democratic Party.

== Early life and education ==
Wyatt was born in Louisville to Richard H. and Mary (Watkins) Wyatt and attended the University of Louisville and the University of Louisville School of Law. He was admitted to the bar in 1927. He was the principal counsel for The Louisville Courier-Journal and other Bingham family-owned media companies prior to launching his political career.

== Mayoralty ==
Wyatt's political career began with his election as the mayor of Louisville in 1941. He took office just after the bombing of Pearl Harbor. Wyatt made civil defense a priority in his city and also initiated Louisville's planning and zoning commission.

At the 1944 Democratic National Convention in Chicago, Wyatt was called upon to advise U.S. Senator Alben W. Barkley of Kentucky, who was scheduled to give the nomination speech for U.S. President Franklin D. Roosevelt. Barkley at first said he would not make the speech after FDR passed him up for the vice-presidential recommendation in favor of Harry S. Truman of Missouri. James A. Farley, FDR's former Postmaster General and Barkley confidant, agreed with Wyatt and insisted that Barkley give what is recalled as a particularly effective oration on Roosevelt's behalf.

Riley served as president of the National League of Cities in 1945.

== Truman administration ==
As Wyatt's term as mayor of Louisville ended, President Harry Truman, who in 1948 would tap Barkley as his vice-presidential choice, appointed Wyatt as United States Housing Expediter for the Office of War Mobilization, a position given Cabinet-level rank.

With Eleanor Roosevelt, Arthur Schlesinger, Jr., Hubert Humphrey, and others, Wyatt took a leading role in the founding and leadership of an interest group, Americans for Democratic Action. He was the first ADA chairman in 1947.

Wyatt was the campaign manager for Adlai Stevenson's 1952 presidential campaign and played a prominent role in Stevenson's 1956 presidential campaign. Both ended in losses to Dwight D. Eisenhower.

== Lieutenant governorship ==
In 1959, Wyatt planned to run for governor of Kentucky. Instead, he ran for lieutenant governor with Bert T. Combs at the top of the ticket. Combs and Wyatt were both elected and served in those offices from 1959 through 1963. Combs' administration created the Kentucky Economic Development Commission, with Wyatt as its chairman.

In 1962, Wyatt was the unsuccessful Democratic nominee for the United States Senate but lost the election to the moderate Republican incumbent, Thruston B. Morton.

== Special envoy to Indonesia ==
In 1963, President John F. Kennedy appointed Wyatt as a special envoy to Indonesia. Wyatt's mission was successful and Sukarno did not take over foreign-owned elements of the Indonesian oil industry, as had occurred in Mexico in 1938.

== Return to law and later career ==
After leaving the lieutenant governor's office in 1963, Wyatt returned to the law firm which he had co-founded in the late 1940s. Originally known as Wyatt, Grafton & Grafton, the firm had changed name partners when Wyatt became lieutenant governor. The Grafton brothers, Cornelius ("Chip"), father of noted mystery novelist, Sue Grafton, and Arthur had formed the firm with Wyatt. Chip Grafton's practice was heavily oriented to representation of municipal bond issuers. Wyatt's position as lieutenant governor presented a conflict of interest for the law firm. As a result, Chip left the firm and instead formed Harper, Ferguson, Grafton & Fleischer. The Wyatt firm became known as Wyatt, Grafton & Sloss, with partner Robert L. Sloss elevated to name status.

Vice President Hubert Humphrey had Wyatt play an important role at the 1968 Democratic National Convention, again in Chicago. Wyatt, who twenty-four years earlier had soothed the hurt feelings of Alben Barkley, then devised a compromise over the party's platform plank in regard to the lingering Vietnam War.

For the remainder of his life, Wyatt was active in the legal community and with civic affairs in Kentucky. He and his wife, Anne, donated $500,000 to the Jefferson County public schools to create scholarships for high school debaters, and another $500,000 to the law school at the University of Louisville, where he had once served as chairman of the trustees. The university in 1995 named its law school building after Wyatt. He served a term as chairman of the board of trustees at Bellarmine University; a sizeable donation from the Wyatts funds a lecture series at the school.

== Death ==
Wyatt died in 1996.

Political offices
Preceded by Joseph D. Scholtz	Mayor of Louisville; 1941–1945	Succeeded by E. Leland Taylor
Preceded by John Blandford Jr.	Administrator of the National Housing Agency; 1946	Succeeded by Raymond Foley
Preceded by Harry Waterfield	Lieutenant Governor of Kentucky; 1959–1963	Succeeded by Harry Waterfield
Party political offices
Preceded by Earle C. Clements	Democratic nominee for U.S. Senator from Kentucky (Class 3); 1962	Succeeded by Katherine Peden
Non-profit organization positions
Preceded by William W. Scranton	President of the National Municipal League; 1972–1975	Succeeded by Carl Pforzheimer
