= Harry Lee Waterfield =

American politician (1911–1988)

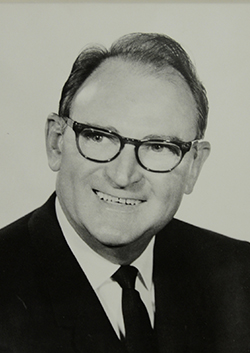

42nd and 44th Lieutenant Governor of Kentucky
- In office December 10, 1963 – December 12, 1967
- Governor: Edward T. Breathitt
- Preceded by: Wilson W. Wyatt
- Succeeded by: Wendell H. Ford
- In office December 13, 1955 – December 8, 1959
- Governor: Happy Chandler
- Preceded by: Emerson Beauchamp
- Succeeded by: Wilson W. Wyatt

5th Chair of the National Lieutenant Governors Association
- In office 1966–1967
- Preceded by: John William Brown
- Succeeded by: Malcolm Wilson

Personal details
- Born: January 19, 1911 Calloway County, Kentucky, U.S.
- Died: August 4, 1988 (aged 77) United States
- Party: Democratic

Harry Lee Waterfield (January 19, 1911 – August 4, 1988), an American Democratic politician, he served as the 42nd and 44th lieutenant governor of Kentucky and unsuccessfully sought election as governor of Kentucky.

Waterfield was originally from Calloway County, Kentucky. He published the Hickman County Gazette and four other West Kentucky newspapers, was president of the Kentucky Press Association and a member of the Kentucky House of Representatives in 1938–1947 and 1950–1951. He was House speaker in 1944–46 and sought the Democratic nomination for governor in 1947, 1959 and 1967. He founded Investors Heritage Life Insurance Co. in Frankfort in 1961 and served as its president and chairman until his death.

Waterfield twice won election as Lieutenant Governor of Kentucky and held that office in 1955–1959 and 1963–1967. He was the first person to win election to two terms in the office, and the only one to do it before candidates for the post officially slated with candidates for governor. He served under Happy Chandler in his first term and under Edward T. Breathitt in his second.

Waterfield was generally considered anti-administration before winning his 1955 lieutenant governor's race. He was a major figure in the drive for legislative independence. As house speaker, he fought for creation of a legislative research commission which became reality in 1948. He was the second director of the LRC from 1957 to 1959.

Waterfield became a factional ally of Chandler, though at first they were not friendly to one another politically. In 1947 Waterfield sought election as Governor of Kentucky but was defeated in the Democratic primary by Chandler's factional enemy, Earle C. Clements (who had Chandler's support that year, perhaps because of past conflict with Waterfield's father-in-law, who had been the independently elected agriculture commissioner during Chandler's first term as governor). In 1950 Clements was elected to the United States Senate where he served as Senate Majority Whip when Lyndon Johnson was Senate Majority Leader. Chandler then helped defeat Clements when Clements sought re-election in 1956. Clements then helped his factional ally at the time, Bert T. Combs, defeat Waterfield, Chandler's hand-picked successor, for governor in 1959. Combs defeated Waterfield in the primary and went on to win the office and help secure the election of his own chosen successor, Edward T. Breathitt, in 1963. The factionalism continued, as Breathitt defeated Chandler in the 1963 primary for governor before winning the general election. He and Waterfield campaigned together against Republican Louie B. Nunn but in 1964 Waterfield led an anti-administration faction of state senators that blocked much of Breathitt's legislative program. In the 1965 primary, Breathitt supported 10 challengers to Democratic senators, and seven of them won, greatly diminishing Waterfield's influence and helping pass Breathitt's program. In 1967 Waterfield again sought the Democratic nomination for governor but lost the primary to administration-backed candidate Henry Ward, who lost the general election to Nunn.

Waterfield was a Kentucky delegate to the Democratic National Convention in 1948 and 1956 and helped lead an attempt to secure the Democratic nomination for president for Happy Chandler in 1956.

The primary library at Waterfield's alma mater, Murray State University, is named in his honor.

Political offices
Preceded by Emerson Beauchamp	Lieutenant Governor of Kentucky; 1955–1959	Succeeded by Wilson W. Wyatt
Preceded by Wilson W. Wyatt	Lieutenant Governor of Kentucky; 1963–1967	Succeeded by Wendell H. Ford
Party political offices
Preceded by Emerson Beauchamp	Democratic nominee for Lieutenant Governor of Kentucky; 1955	Succeeded by Wilson W. Wyatt
Preceded by Wilson W. Wyatt	Democratic nominee for Lieutenant Governor of Kentucky; 1963	Succeeded by Wendell H. Ford
