= Ned Breathitt =

American politician (1924–2003)

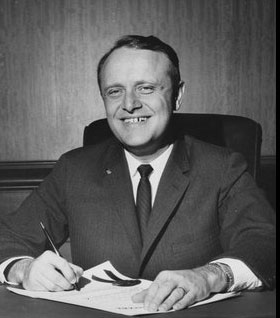
- Breathitt in 1964

51st Governor of Kentucky
- In office December 10, 1963 – December 12, 1967
- Lieutenant: Harry Lee Waterfield
- Preceded by: Bert Combs
- Succeeded by: Louie Nunn

Member of the Kentucky House of Representatives from the 9th district
- In office January 1, 1952 – January 1, 1958
- Preceded by: James P. Hanratty
- Succeeded by: T. Fowler Combs

Personal details
- Born: Edward Thompson Breathitt Jr. November 26, 1924 Hopkinsville, Kentucky, U.S.
- Died: October 14, 2003 (aged 78) Lexington, Kentucky, U.S.
- Resting place: Riverside Cemetery; Hopkinsville, Kentucky
- Party: Democratic
- Spouses: Frances Holleman (m. 1948; died 1985) Lucy Alexander Winchester (m. 1988–2003)
- Children: 4
- Relatives: James Breathitt Jr. (uncle)
- Profession: Lawyer

Military service
- Allegiance: United States
- Branch/service: United States Army; U.S. Army Air Force
- Years of service: 1942–1945

Edward Thompson Breathitt Jr. (November 26, 1924 – October 14, 2003) was an American politician from the Commonwealth of Kentucky. A member of one of the state's political families, he was the 51st governor of Kentucky, serving from 1963 to 1967. After serving in World War II and graduating from the University of Kentucky, Breathitt worked on the presidential campaign of Adlai Stevenson, the senatorial campaign of Alben Barkley, and the gubernatorial campaign of Bert T. Combs. When Combs won the governorship in 1959, he appointed Breathitt as personnel commissioner, where he wrote legislation establishing the first merit system for state employees. He continued to hold appointive offices throughout Combs' tenure, and in 1962, Combs endorsed Breathitt to succeed him as governor.

Breathitt defeated two-time former governor A. B. "Happy" Chandler in the Democratic primary, ending Chandler's political career. He went on to win the general election over Republican Louie B. Nunn. Breathitt continued Combs' work of improving state highways and parks, improving education funding, and strengthening regulations on strip mining. His major accomplishment as governor was the passage of the Kentucky Civil Rights Act, the first desegregation law passed by a southern state. His biggest disappointment was his inability to win approval of a new state constitution.

Following his term as governor, Breathitt worked as legal counsel for Southern Railway, and later became vice-president of public affairs for Norfolk Southern Corporation. He engaged in numerous community service activities and served on political commissions aimed at eliminating poverty. Breathitt collapsed while making a speech at Lexington Community College on October 10, 2003. He was admitted to the University of Kentucky Hospital, but remained comatose after the collapse and died four days later.

Breathitt's oral history project is housed at the Louie B. Nunn Center for Oral History at the University of Kentucky Libraries.

== Early life ==
Ned Breathitt was born in Hopkinsville, Kentucky, on November 26, 1924. He was the only child of Edward Thompson Breathitt and Mary (Wallace) Breathitt. Breathitt's family had a considerable tradition in politics. A distant relative, John Breathitt had been governor of Kentucky in 1832. James Breathitt Sr., Ned Breathitt's grandfather, had served as state attorney general from 1907 to 1911, and his uncle, James Breathitt Jr., was lieutenant governor from 1927 to 1932.

Breathitt obtained his early education in the public schools of Hopkinsville and graduated from Hopkinsville High School in 1942. Later that year, he enlisted in the U.S. Army Air Force for service during World War II, serving until 1945. After the war, he matriculated to the University of Kentucky. While there, he served as president of the Omicron Delta Kappa honor society and the Lamp and Cross society; he was also a member of the Sigma Alpha Epsilon social fraternity. Seeing Breathitt's interest in politics, professors Jack Reeves and Thomas D. Clark asked him to chair the campus campaign supporting a new state constitution. Breathitt accepted, and although the proposed constitution failed, he remained committed to seeing the document updated.

In 1948, Breathitt earned a Bachelor of Arts degree in business administration. On December 20, 1948, he married Frances Holleman of Mayfield, Kentucky. The couple had four children: Mary Fran, Linda, Susan, and Edward III. In 1950, Breathitt earned a Bachelor of Laws degree and returned to Hopkinsville where he joined the law firm of Trimble, Soyars, and Breathitt.

== Political career ==
In 1951, Breathitt was elected to the first of three consecutive terms in the Kentucky House of Representatives, representing the Ninth District. As a legislator, he was the acknowledged leader of a faction that opposed the programs of Governor A. B. "Happy" Chandler. He supported the state's first legislation regulating strip mining, improved registration and election laws, and campaigned for revision of the state constitution. He also co-sponsored the Minimum Foundation Program for Education. From 1952 to 1954, Breathitt served as president of the Young Democrats Clubs of Kentucky and as a member of the national committee for the Young Democrats of America. He was chair of the state speaker's bureau for Adlai Stevenson's presidential campaign in 1952, and two years later, he worked on the staff of Senator Alben Barkley's re-election campaign.

Bert T. Combs put Breathitt in charge of his campaign against Wilson Wyatt in the Democratic gubernatorial primary in 1959. When Combs was elected governor later that year, he appointed Breathitt as State Personnel Commissioner, charging him with writing legislation to create a merit system for state employees. After successfully guiding the legislation through the General Assembly, Breathitt resigned as personnel commissioner to accept an appointment to the Kentucky Public Service Commission. He was also served as chair of a failed state constitutional convention in 1960 and was a member of the Governor's Commission on Mental Health.

=== 1963 gubernatorial campaign ===
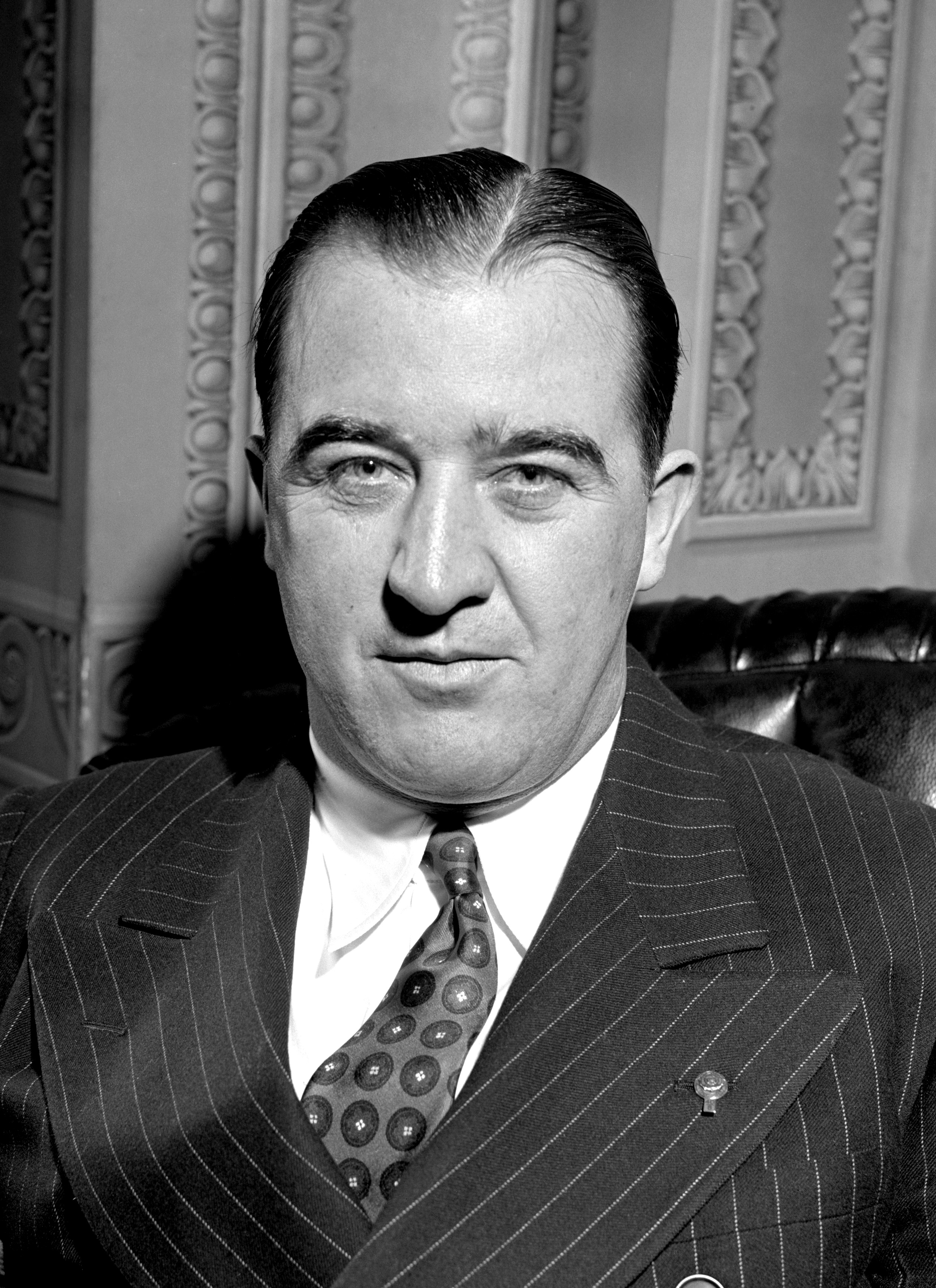
Happy Chandler's loss to Breathitt in 1963 ended his political career

In 1962, two-time former governor and Democratic factional leader Happy Chandler had already begun his campaign for a third term as governor. The anti-Chandler faction became concerned that, if they did not name a candidate, Chandler's early announcement would give him an advantage in the 1963 election. Leaders of the faction were solidly behind state Highway Commissioner Henry Ward, but Governor Combs was leaning toward Breathitt. Breathitt announced his candidacy on May 2, 1962, but many in his party remained skeptical due to his youth and relative inexperience. Combs eventually convinced the anti-Chandler faction to back Breathitt, and Ward never became a candidate.

During the primary campaign, Chandler focused his attacks on the Combs administration rather than the inexperienced Breathitt. A seasoned campaigner, he bitterly attacked the three percent sales tax enacted during the Combs administration. Breathitt struck back with accusations that, as a senator, Chandler had voted in favor of declaring war on Japan during World War II, but resigned his army commission shortly thereafter. He further charged that Chandler's son-in-law was collecting campaign donations from individuals who desired favors from state government. The younger Breathitt, thirty-eight years old when the campaign began, adapted well to the relatively new medium of television, while the aging Chandler did not. Breathitt won the primary by more than 60,000 votes and carried all but one of the state's congressional districts. Chandler's running mate, Harry Lee Waterfield, easily won the nomination for lieutenant governor over Breathitt's running mate, John B. Breckinridge, showing that the defeat was not so much a result of factionalism as a personal rebuff of Chandler. This campaign ended Chandler's political career.

In the general election, Breathitt challenged Republican Louie B. Nunn. Still stinging from his primary defeat, Happy Chandler endorsed Nunn, which hurt Breathitt with some members of his own party. During the campaign, Nunn attacked an executive order issued by Governor Combs that desegregated public accommodations in Kentucky as "rule by executive decree". Appearing on television with a copy of the executive order, Nunn proclaimed that "my first act will be to abolish this." Nunn's proclamation won him the support of some conservative Democrats, but cost him Republican votes, especially in Louisville. The New Republic charged that Nunn ran "the first outright segregationist campaign in Kentucky." Breathitt won the election by 13,055 votes.

=== Governor of Kentucky ===
The first legislative session of Breathitt's administration was a disappointment to his faction. His youth and narrow margin of victory in the election undermined his authority. Further, the unexpected death of Richard P. Moloney, a key legislative leader, was a blow to Breathitt's ability to push his agenda through the General Assembly. The major accomplishment of the 1964 session was the approval of a $176 million bond issue to increased funding for roads, public education, the state park system, and social services. Other minor accomplishments included passing a purchasing law, strengthening strip mining regulations, and improving benefits for teachers.

Much of the 1964 session was devoted to a bill to desegregate public accommodations in Kentucky. A rally in favor of the bill was held in March and was attended by Dr. Martin Luther King Jr., Reverend Ralph Abernathy, and baseball player Jackie Robinson. Despite this, the bill did not make it out of legislative committee. As a member of the Southern Governors' Association (SGA) in October 1964, Breathitt was one of three governors to oppose George Wallace's proposed constitutional amendment to give states and state courts sole jurisdiction over their public schools, preventing a federal law to integrate them. Breathitt's opposition helped prevent the SGA's endorsement of the amendment, since endorsement required a unanimous vote.

The 1964 General Assembly also passed legislation to draft a new state constitution. Thirty-eight citizens were chosen to draft the new document, which was based on national models. County leaders opposed the document because of perceived threats to the independence of local governments and an apparent consolidation of power in Frankfort. Despite Breathitt's strong support, the proposed constitution was defeated by Kentucky voters by an overwhelming margin of 510,099 to 140,210.

Breathitt expanded the state park system and led the state to join the Tennessee Valley Authority in developing the Land Between the Lakes National Recreation Area. In 1965, the Midwest Travel Writer's Association presented Breathitt with its top national award for having the best travel promotion. That same year, he was named to the University of Kentucky Alumni Association Hall of Distinguished Alumni.

A June 1965 ruling by the Kentucky Court of Appeals that property must be assessed at its full value prompted calls for a special session from Kentucky taxpayers. Breathitt obliged, calling the session in July. He proposed a reduction in property tax rates to offset the increase in the assessed value of property, and also advocated small increased in other tax rates to benefit public schools. The plan passed despite opposition from Lieutenant Governor Harry Lee Waterfield.

The 1966 legislative session was much more successful for Breathitt. His economic development program, which led to construction or expansion of 749 industries, 57,000 new jobs, and more than $1 billion in new plant investment, was recognized as the nation's best by the Society of Industrial Investors in 1964 and generated an additional $100 million in state revenue. The pro-administration majority in the legislature was expanded in the 1965 elections, and Waterfield, Breathitt's sometimes hostile lieutenant governor, was stripped of much of his authority. Former governor Lawrence Wetherby was selected president pro tempore of the senate, providing effective leadership in that house of the General Assembly. Wetherby introduced a budget which was 27 percent larger than the previous one and contained appropriations for most of the state's political districts. Wetherby's leadership was so effective that the budget passed both houses of the Assembly, virtually unchanged, by votes of 99–0 and 31–5 only ten days later.

==== Kentucky Civil Rights Act ====
Passage of the national Civil Rights Act of 1964 had paved the way for an even stronger civil rights bill in the 1966 legislative session. The Assembly easily passed the Kentucky Civil Rights Act opening all public accommodations to people of every race and prohibiting racial discrimination in employment by firms that employed eight or more people. The act applied to many kinds of businesses not covered by the federal statute, and approximately ninety percent of the businesses in Kentucky were affected, compared to only sixty percent that were covered by the federal statute. The act was the first of its kind passed in a southern state. In 1966, Breathitt was presented with the Lincoln Key Award for his leadership in the bill's passage. In 1966 and 1967, he was chair of the Southern Governors' Conference's Committee on Regional and Interstate Cooperation. He was also the only state governor named to the President's Council on Human Rights.

Breathitt was a member of National Governors Conference Executive Committee in 1964 and 1965 and chaired its Natural Resources Committee. In the 1966 legislature, he won approval for several conservation measures, including the creation of an authority to regulate water, soil, and forest resources. The session also tightened strip mining laws to prohibit mining on mountainsides that were too steep to be restored. In 1967, he was recognized with the U.S. Department of Interior's Distinguished Service Award and Outdoor Life magazine's Conservationist of the Year Award for his contributions to conservation.

Other accomplishments of the 1966 legislature included the passage of a compulsory vehicle inspection law, tightening of restrictions on political contributions and expenditures by candidates for political office, and approval of a legislative redistricting law. The governor's road construction projects continued apace, and by the end of his term, Kentucky had more miles of highway under construction than any other state.

During his term as governor, Breathitt was chair of the board of trustees at the University of Kentucky. Under his leadership, the state's community colleges were placed under the governance of the university. Four state colleges achieved university status during Breathitt's administration. He also established the Kentucky Educational Television network and Kentucky's vocational education system.

== Later life and death ==
Breathitt was limited to one term by Kentucky's constitution at the time. He returned to his legal practice in Hopkinsville, and in December 1967, became Special Counsel in Kentucky for Southern Railway. In July 1968, he was named director of the Ford Foundation's Institute for Rural America, suggesting legislative remedies for poverty including the establishment of state area development districts. In 1971, he helped found the Coalition for Rural America and was elected its chair. The Coalition worked to implement the suggestions of the Institute for Rural America. Breathitt also served as president of the American Child Centers to promote private preschool education and was appointed as the federal representative on the Southern Interstate Nuclear Board in September 1968. When Southern Railway became part of Norfolk Southern Corporation in 1972, Breathitt became vice-president for public affairs, a position he held until his retirement in 1992.

Breathitt was an important adviser to Governor John Y. Brown Jr., who appointed him to the University of Kentucky's board of trustees in 1981 and 1982. Breathitt's wife Frances died of complications from cancer on July 11, 1985. On April 2, 1988, he married Lucy Alexander Winchester, a former social secretary to First Lady Pat Nixon and cousin to Libby Jones, wife of future Kentucky governor Brereton Jones.

Breathitt later served on the boards of regents of Kentucky State University and Morehead State University, in both cases serving with former political rival Louie B. Nunn. From 1992 to 2000, he again served on the University of Kentucky's board, acting as chairman of the board in all but his final year. During his chairmanship, he clashed with Governor Paul E. Patton over a plan to separate all of the state's community colleges (except Lexington Community College) from the university's governance and place them under a newly created body called the Kentucky Community and Technical College System. Patton's plan prevailed, and he and Breathitt later mended political fences.

In 1992, Breathitt joined the law firm of Wyatt, Tarrant, and Combs. He undertook several volunteer community service activities, including serving as director of Home Loan Bank in Cincinnati and chairman of the Kentucky Heart Fund. He was appointed to the Southern Region Education Board and the Kentucky Council on Higher Education. In 1994, he was named to the Gatton College of Business Alumni Hall of Fame at the University of Kentucky; in 1997, he received a similar honor from the College of Law at the university. He also received an honorary doctorate from Murray State University in 1994. In 1999, he received the Henry Clay Medallion for Distinguished Service and in 2000, Eastern Kentucky University's Center for Kentucky History and Politics presented him with the John Sherman Cooper Award for Outstanding Public Service to Kentucky. He retired from the practice of law in 2002.

While giving a speech at Lexington Community College on October 10, 2003, Breathitt collapsed due to ventricular fibrillation. He was partly resuscitated and admitted to the University of Kentucky Hospital but remained comatose and died on October 14. He was buried at the Riverside Cemetery in Hopkinsville, Kentucky. In 2000, the Pennyrile Parkway in western Kentucky was renamed the Edward T. Breathitt Pennyrile Parkway in his honor.

Political offices
Preceded by Bert T. Combs	Governor of Kentucky; 1963–1967	Succeeded by Louie Nunn
Party political offices
Preceded by Bert T. Combs	Democratic nominee for Governor of Kentucky; 1963	Succeeded by Henry Ward
