= 1950 United States Senate elections in Kentucky =

1950 United States Senate election in Kentucky
- November 7, 1950
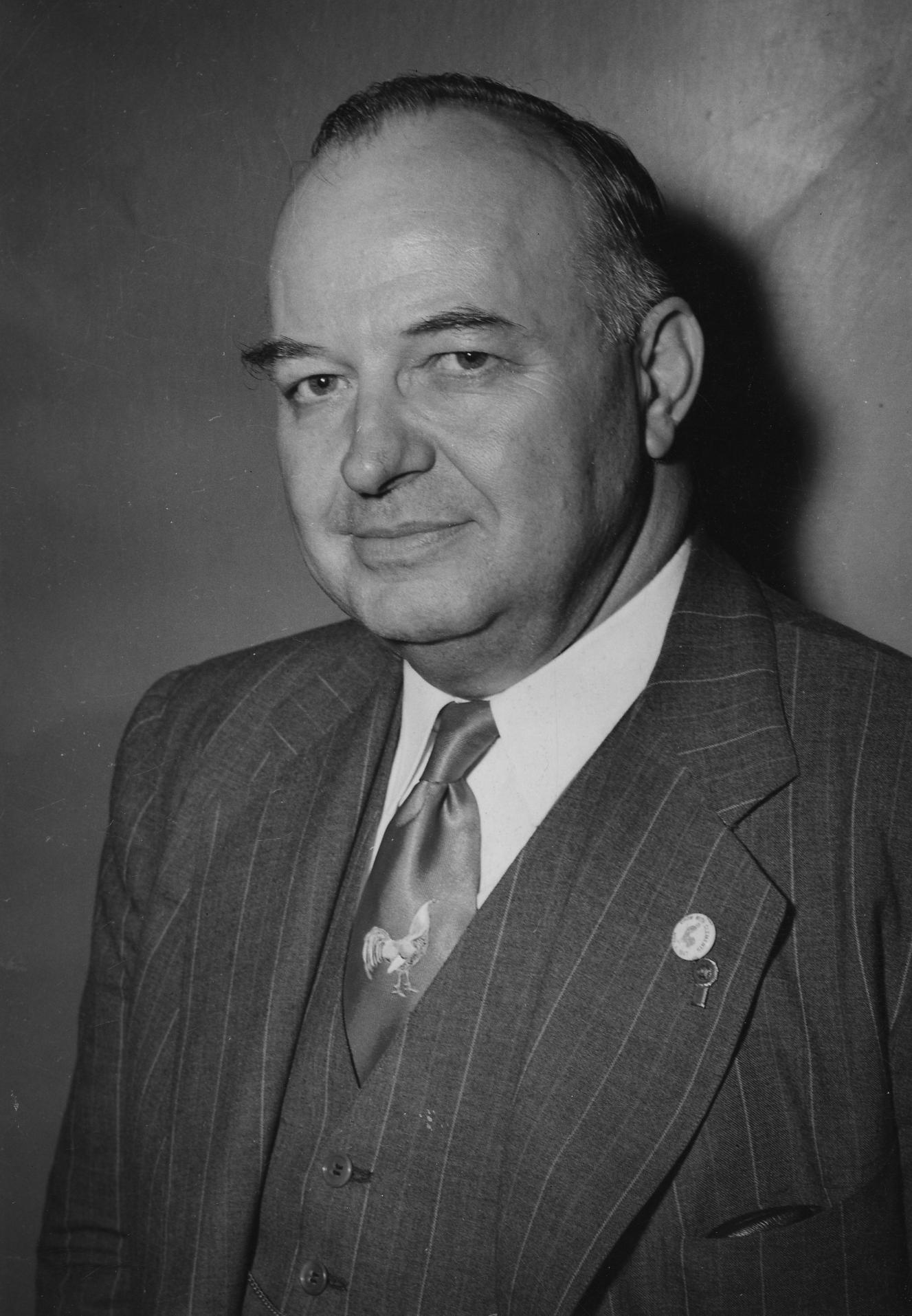

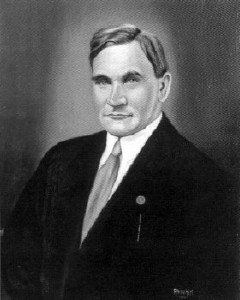
Nominee	Earle Clements	Charles I. Dawson
Party	Democratic	Republican
Popular vote	334,249	278,368
Percentage	54.2%	45.1%
- County results (regular election); Clements: 50–60% 60–70% 70–80% 80–90% Dawson: 50–60% 60–70% 70–80% 80–90%
U.S. senator before election
Earle Clements
Democratic
Elected U.S. Senator
Earle Clements
Democratic

Two United States Senate elections for the Class 3 U.S. Senate seat from Kentucky were held simultaneously on November 7, 1950.

After Senator Alben Barkley resigned on January 19, 1949, to become Vice President of the United States, Governor Earle Clements appointed Garrett L. Withers to fill the vacant seat until a successor could be duly elected to complete the expired term. The special election was scheduled for November 7, 1950, concurrent with the regular election to the next term. Clements appointed Withers with the intention of running for the seat himself, which he did, defeating Republican former judge Charles I. Dawson in both elections.

== Primary elections ==
=== Democratic primary ===
==== Candidates ====
- Earle Clements, Governor of Kentucky
- James L. Delk
- George G. Hatcher, Secretary of State of Kentucky
- Dennis E. McQueary

==== Results ====
Primary results by county Clements: 40%–50%; 50%–60%; 60%–70%; 70%–80%; 80%–90%; 90%–100%; Hatcher: 40%–50%; 50%–60%; 60%–70%

Democratic primary results
Party	Candidate	Votes	%
Democratic	Earle Clements	114,482	70.88
Democratic	George G. Hatcher	38,010	23.53
Democratic	Dennis E. McQueary	4,874	3.02
Democratic	James L. Delk	4,156	2.57
Total votes		161,522	100.00

=== Republican primary ===
==== Candidates ====
- James W. Brown
- Charles I. Dawson, former Judge of the U.S. District Court for the Western District of Kentucky
- Charles E. Whittle

==== Results ====
Primary results by county Dawson: 50%–60%; 60%–70%; 70%–80%; 80%–90%; 90%–100%; Whittle: 40%–50%

Republican primary results
Party	Candidate	Votes	%
Republican	Charles I. Dawson	36,461	76.07
Republican	James W. Brown	5,763	12.02
Republican	Charles E. Whittle	5,710	11.91
Total votes		47,934	100.00

== General election ==
=== Candidates ===
- Earle Clements, Governor of Kentucky (Democratic)
- Charles I. Dawson, Louisville attorney and former Judge of the U.S. District Court for the Western District of Kentucky (Republican)
- James E. Olson (Independent) (Note: Olson did not contest the special election for the remainder of the term.)

=== Results ===
1950 U.S. Senate election in Kentucky
Party	Candidate	Votes	%	±%
Democratic	Earle Clements	334,249	54.16%	
Republican	Charles I. Dawson	278,368	45.11%	
Independent	James E. Olson	4,496	0.73%	
Majority		55,881	9.05%	
Turnout		617,113		
Democratic hold				

== Special election ==
=== Results ===
1950 U.S. Senate special election in Kentucky
Party	Candidate	Votes	%	±%
Democratic	Earle Clements	317,320	54.40%	
Republican	Charles I. Dawson	265,994	45.60%	
Majority		51,326	8.80%	
Turnout		583,314	19.82%	
Democratic hold				

== See also ==
- 1950 United States Senate elections

== Bibliography ==
- Congressional Elections, 1946-1996. Washington, D.C.: Congressional Quarterly Inc. 1998. ISBN 1-56802-248-4.
- Jewell, Malcolm E. (1963). Kentucky Votes. Vol. 1. University of Kentucky Press.
