= Joseph W. Morris (politician) =

American politician

Joseph Watkins Morris
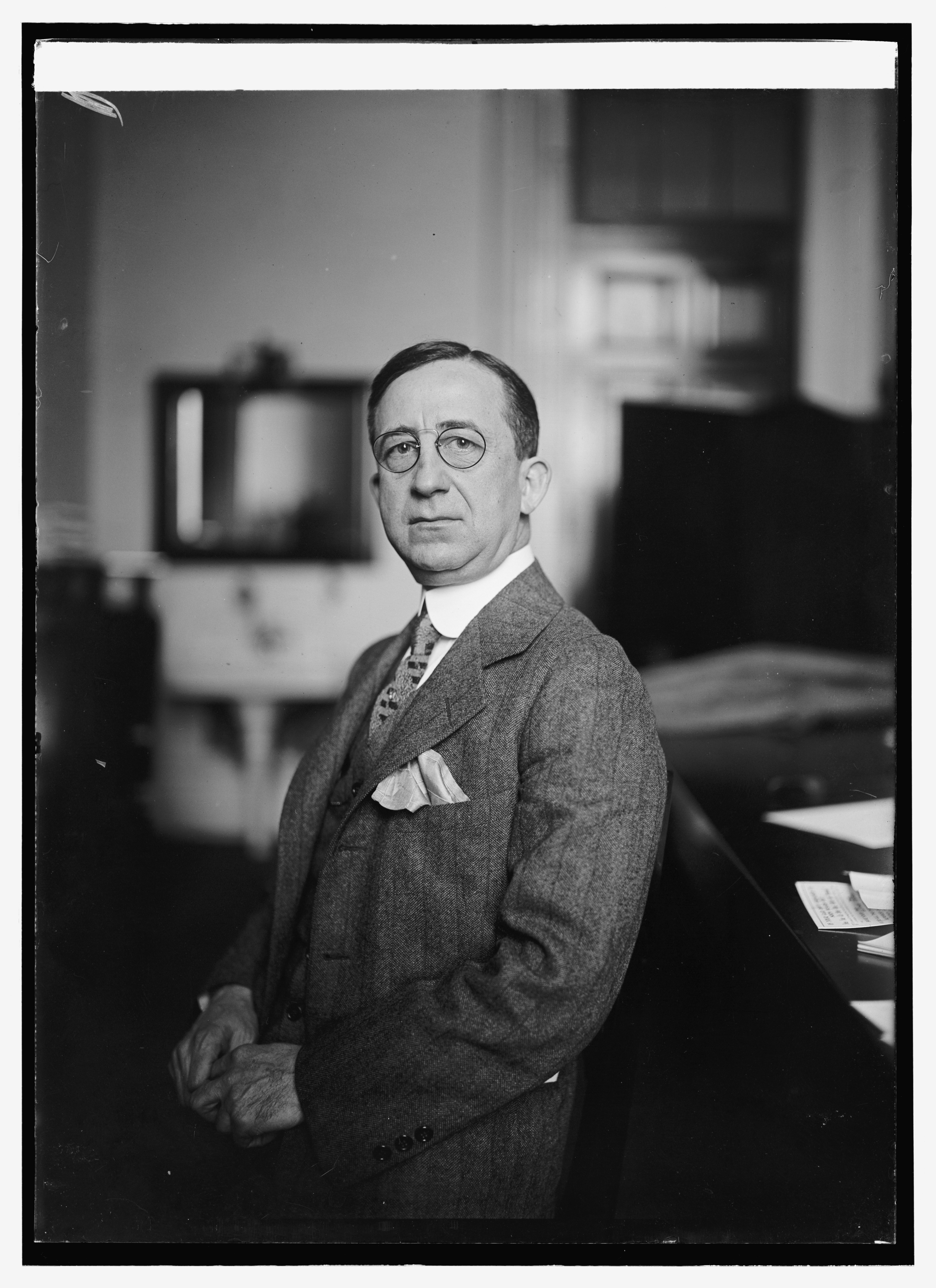

Member of the U.S. House of Representatives from Kentucky's 7th district
- In office November 30, 1923 – March 3, 1925
- Preceded by: J. Campbell Cantrill
- Succeeded by: Virgil M. Chapman

Personal details
- Born: February 26, 1879 Sulphur, Kentucky
- Died: December 21, 1937 (aged 58)

Joseph Watkins Morris (February 26, 1879 – December 21, 1937) was a U.S. representative from Kentucky.

Born in Sulphur, Kentucky, Morris moved to New Castle, Kentucky, with his father in 1889. He attended the public schools and was graduated from the New Castle High School in 1899. He engaged in mercantile pursuits at New Castle. From 1909 to 1923, he served as Secretary to Representative J. Campbell Cantrill. He served as delegate to many consecutive Democratic State conventions starting in 1904. He served as chairman of the Democratic State campaign committee in 1923.

Morris was elected as a Democrat to the Sixty-eighth Congress to fill the vacancy caused by the death of J. Campbell Cantrill and served from November 30, 1923, to March 3, 1925. He was not a candidate for renomination in 1924. He was state revenue agent for Kentucky 1925–1927. He was manager of a bus terminal in Louisville, Kentucky, from 1929 until his death in Louisville, Kentucky, December 21, 1937. He was interred in Odd Fellows Cemetery, Carrollton, Kentucky.

U.S. House of Representatives
Preceded by J. Campbell Cantrill	Member of the U.S. House of Representatives from Kentucky's 7th congressional district 1923–1925	Succeeded by Virgil M. Chapman
