= Sulphur, Kentucky =

Unincorporated community in Kentucky, United States

- Unincorporated community
- Location within Kentucky Location within the United States
- Coordinates: 38°29′41″N 85°16′25″W
- Country: United States
- State: Kentucky
- County: Henry
- Elevation: 689 ft (210 m)
- Time zone: UTC-5 (Eastern (EST))
  - Summer (DST): UTC-4 (EDT)
- ZIP codes: 40070
- GNIS feature ID: 504723

Sulphur is an unincorporated community within Henry County, Kentucky, United States.

== History ==
Sulphur was a station on the Louisville and Cincinnati Railroad. Formerly called Sulphur Station, the post office was renamed Sulphur in 1882.

== Notable people ==
- Joseph W. Morris, U.S. Representative
