= Stephen M. Truitt =

American lawyer

Stephen Truitt
- Education: Harvard University (AB); Yale University (LLB)
- Occupation: Lawyer
- Relatives: Alben W. Barkley (grandfather); Jane Barkley (step-grandmother)

Stephen M. Truitt is an American lawyer in Washington, D.C. who worked for the Pepper Hamilton law firm.

== Education ==
Truitt earned a Bachelor of Arts degree in psychology from Harvard University in 1963 and a Bachelor of Laws from Yale Law School in 1966.

== Career ==
Although retired from Pepper Hamilton, Truitt continues to practice general civil litigation as a solo practitioner. In addition, along with former Pepper colleague Charles Carpenter, he has volunteered to serve pro bono to help Guantanamo captives, and represents two men currently held there: Hani Saleh Rashid Abdullah (a.k.a. Sa id Salih Sa id Nashir) and Maher El Falesteny (a.k.a. Mahrar Rafat Al Quwari). Former client Rami Bin Said Al Taibi was transferred to Saudi Arabia in 2007.

On behalf of Hani Abdullah, Carpenter and Truitt sought a report concerning possible destruction of evidence by the United States Department of Defense and Central Intelligence Agency, notwithstanding a court order not to destroy evidence.

Truitt is a plaintiff in Wilner v. NSA.

Truitt and Carpenter also represented the Native Forest Council in its challenge of the Northwest Forest Plan for protection of the northern spotted owl.

Truitt represented a number of companies that had claims against Iran arising from the Iranian Revolution before the Iran–United States Claims Tribunal, and was the first to address the full tribunal in the Forum Clause cases. He later represented a class of Tribunal claimants whose claims were espoused by the United States and settled. He also represented the National Iranian Oil Company in an action against Ashland Oil, Inc. for $283 million in oil shipments not paid for by Ashland. This case was settled in 1989 just prior to trial set in Mississippi with Ashland paying NIOC $325 million in settlement of NIOC's claims and Ashland's counterclaims.

Previously, Truitt represented the Aleut community of St. Paul Island (a federally-recognized tribe) in a suit against the United States filed in 1954 and finally litigated in the late 1960s and 1970s. The claims arose under the Indian Claims Commission Act. The resulting award is the only one ever made exclusively under clause 2(5) of that act permitting recoveries for breach of the government's duty to "deal fairly and honorably with the tribe according to rules not known at law or equity." The award was essentially for a government imposed serfdom on the Tribe from 1876 to 1946.

== Personal life ==
He is the grandson of former Vice President Alben W. Barkley, who shared the ticket with President Harry S. Truman in 1948. Truitt is credited with coining the term "Veep" for Barkley at age 10.
