= William J. Fields =

American politician (1874–1954)

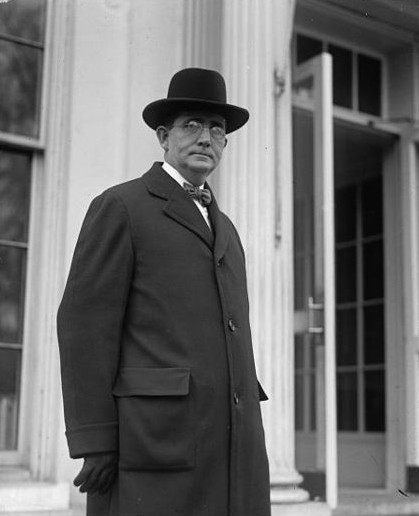

41st Governor of Kentucky
- In office December 11, 1923 – December 13, 1927
- Lieutenant: Henry Denhardt
- Preceded by: Edwin P. Morrow
- Succeeded by: Flem D. Sampson

Member of the U.S. House of Representatives from Kentucky's 9th district
- In office March 4, 1911 – December 11, 1923
- Preceded by: Joseph B. Bennett
- Succeeded by: Fred M. Vinson

Personal details
- Born: December 29, 1874 Willard, Kentucky, U.S.
- Died: October 21, 1954 (aged 79) Grayson, Kentucky, U.S.
- Party: Democratic
- Spouse: Dora McDavid
- Education: University of Kentucky
- Profession: Farmer, Realtor, Lawyer

William Jason Fields (December 29, 1874 – October 21, 1954) was an American politician from the U.S. state of Kentucky. Known as "Honest Bill from Olive Hill", he represented Kentucky's Ninth District in the U.S. House of Representatives from 1911 to 1923, resigning to become the state's 41st governor.

Discouraged by an early defeat for a seat in the state legislature, Fields took a job at a grocery store in Ashland, Kentucky that allowed him to travel the state and meet many people in his congressional district. In 1911, he became the first Democrat elected to Congress from the Ninth District in two decades. Elected to seven consecutive terms, he rose to become the ranking member of the House Committee on Military Affairs during World War I. When Democratic gubernatorial nominee J. Campbell Cantrill died unexpectedly two months before the general election, the Democratic Central Committee chose Fields to replace Cantrill as the nominee. In a campaign that featured more name-calling than substantial debate, Fields secured the backing of the powerful Jockey Club political alliance and won a landslide victory over Republican Attorney General Charles I. Dawson.

The first legislative session of Fields' term was marked by infighting within his own party. His agenda was opposed by a Democratic faction led by former governor J. C. W. Beckham, Louisville Courier-Journal publisher Robert Worth Bingham, and political boss Percy Haly. Fields' signature issue, a $75 million bond issue to construct a state highway system, passed the legislature in 1924, but the electorate refused to approve it in November of that year. Among Fields' accomplishments as governor were an increase in the gasoline tax to help fund his highway program, a reorganization of the state's government bureaucracy, and the preservation of Cumberland Falls from industrial development. He never united the factions of his party, however. His political enemies charged him with nepotism and abusing his pardon power, and the Democrats lost the governorship in 1927 to Republican Flem D. Sampson. Following his service as governor, Fields failed in an attempt to return to his former congressional seat. He was appointed to the State Workman's Compensation Board by Governor A. B. "Happy" Chandler, and after his retirement from public service, he practiced law and worked as a real estate agent until his death on October 21, 1954.

== Early life ==
William J. Fields was born December 29, 1874, in Willard, Kentucky. He was the fourth of twelve children born to Christopher C. and Alice (Rucker) Fields. He was educated in the local public schools, then matriculated to the University of Kentucky. After graduation, he started a real estate business in Olive Hill, Kentucky and engaged in farming. He also studied law on his own.

On October 10, 1893, Fields married Dora McDaniel; the couple had six children. At age 21, he was elected constable of Carter County, but three years later, he fell short in his bid to capture a seat in state legislature. Following the loss, he took a job at a grocery store in Ashland, Kentucky that would allow him to travel the state more freely, make acquaintances, and better position himself for a run for higher office.

== House of Representatives ==
Campaigning under the moniker "Honest Bill from Olive Hill", Fields won a narrow victory as a Democrat to represent Kentucky's Ninth District in the U.S. House of Representatives in 1910. The first Democrat to hold the seat in twenty years, he was re-elected for another six consecutive terms. A member of the Committee on Military Affairs, he eventually became the ranking Democrat on the committee and the ranking member of the subcommittee that controlled appropriations for U.S. operations during World War I.

In September 1923, Democratic gubernatorial nominee J. Campbell Cantrill died, leaving the party without a candidate. Alben Barkley, who Cantrill had defeated for the nomination, refused to be the Democratic candidate, perhaps because he had already decided to run for the U.S. Senate in 1926. The Democratic Central Committee chose Fields as a replacement for Cantrill.

== Governor of Kentucky ==
The general election campaign generated little interest and quickly degenerated into name calling. Fields' opponent, Republican Attorney General Charles I. Dawson, mocked Fields' traditional election slogan, calling him "Dodging Bill from Olive Hill, who answers no questions and never will". Fields countered by referring to Dawson as "Changing Charlie", a reference to Dawson's one-time affiliation with the Democratic Party prior to becoming a Republican. Fields secured the backing of a group of powerful political bosses, including Louisville banker James B. Brown, U.S. Senator Augustus Owsley Stanley, and Lexington power broker Billy Klair. These three were the leaders of the Jockey Club, a group dedicated to the preservation of parimutuel betting in the state, especially at racetracks. Discontent with incumbent Republican Governor Edwin P. Morrow further aided Fields' campaign, and he defeated Dawson by a vote of 356,035 (53%) to 306,277 (46%). It was one of the largest Democratic gubernatorial landslides in state history. He resigned from the House to accept the governorship.

Already lightly regarded because he was selected by the Democratic Central Committee instead of a party primary, Fields further weakened his position due to some of his personal preferences. A devout Methodist and prohibitionist, Fields prohibited both dancing and drinking at the Executive Mansion. He moved the inaugural ball from the mansion to the capitol rotunda, where dancing would be allowed, but he and his wife did not attend. Fields' frugality also led him to keep dairy cows on the mansion's lawn, drawing derision from urban citizens.

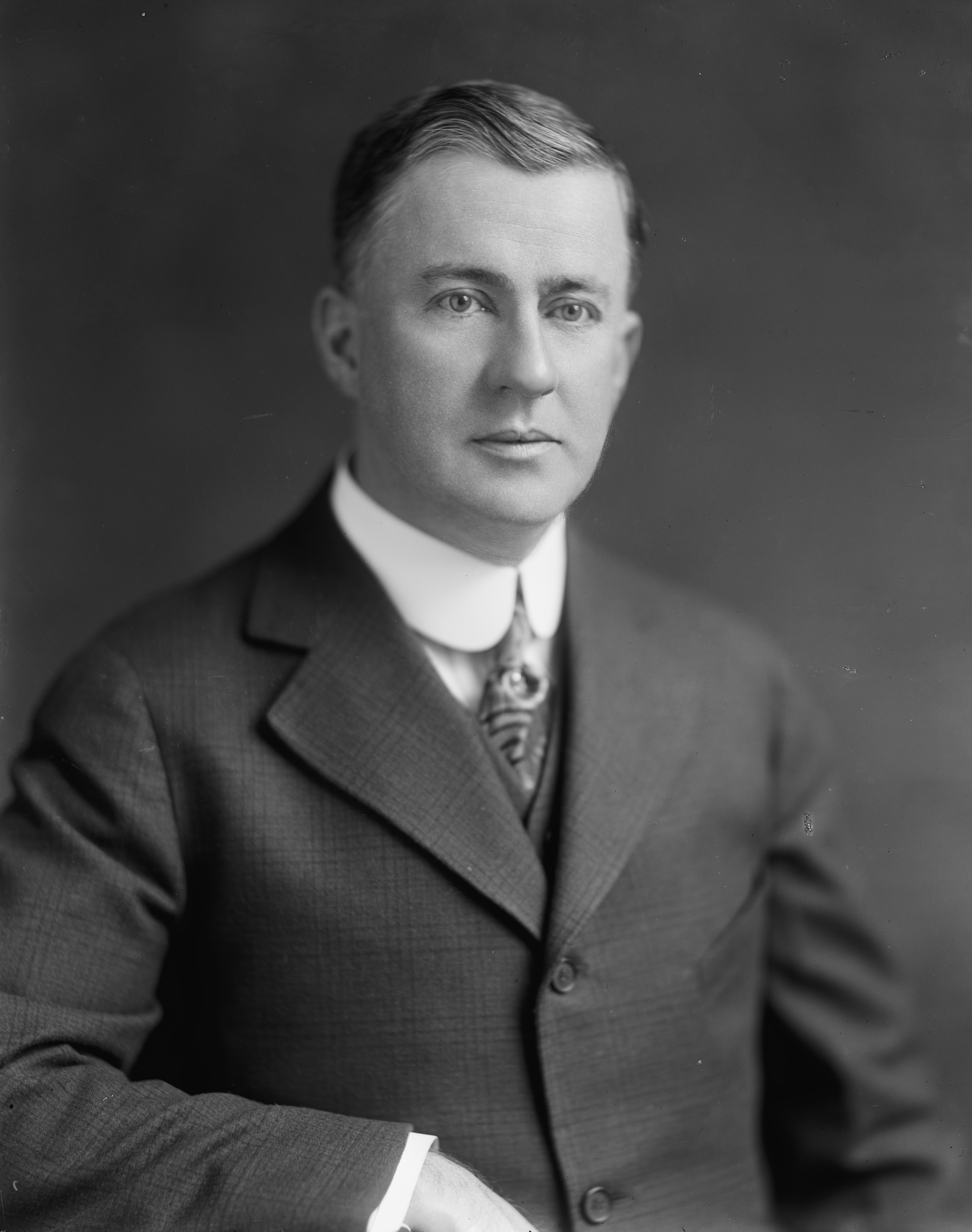
J. C. W. Beckham led a Democratic faction that opposed Fields for the duration of his term as governor.

Fields' 1924 address to the General Assembly included several ambitious proposals, including the founding of a trade school for blacks at Paducah, planning and developing normal schools at Murray and Morehead, raising the gasoline tax to three cents per gallon, and the issuance of $75 million in state bonds to finance a state highway system. A dissenting faction of the Democratic party, led by former governor J. C. W. Beckham, political boss Percy Haly, and Louisville Courier-Journal publisher Robert Worth Bingham, voiced strong opposition to Fields' proposals, especially the bond issue. They charged that Fields had the support of a dangerous "bipartisan combine", with the Republican element of the combine led by Maurice Galvin.

Tensions between the factions were inflamed almost as soon as the 1924 legislature convened. A bill to outlaw parimutuel betting in the state passed the House of Representatives, but failed in the Senate. The next legislative battle centered on removing the head of the Board of Charities and Corrections and give the governor greater control over the board's makeup; this attempt also narrowly failed. When Senator Stanley, an opponent of prohibition, sought re-election to the Senate in 1924, Fields and his allies did not support him, leading to the election of Republican Frederick M. Sackett and giving the Republicans both of the state's senate seats for the first time in history.

The signature issue of the session, however, was Fields' request for the bond issue. He engaged in a debate with opponents of the issue that was published in Bingham's Courier-Journal as well as the Louisville Herald and Louisville Post, two papers owned by James B. Brown. Ultimately, the issue was approved by the General Assembly, which was considered a major victory for Fields. Still, the bond issue had to be approved by the state's electorate. The Courier-Journal continued the fight against the issue, while Desha Breckinridge's Lexington Herald came out in favor of it. Fields spent ten weeks criss-crossing the state speaking in favor of the bond issue, but on election day, it was rejected by a margin of 90,000 votes.

Undaunted by the failure of the bond issue, Fields returned to the 1926 General Assembly with more proposals, including another increase in the gasoline tax to provide the funds needed to construct the state highway system. The 1926 Assembly passed more legislation than any previous legislature, including the increased gas tax and several bills to reorganize state government. The state purchasing commission and the Department of Bus Transportation were among the entities created in the reorganization. Under Fields, the state implemented the first phase of desegregation busing.

Fields opposed a plan to develop hydroelectric power generation capabilities on the Cumberland Falls. In order to prevent development, he accepted an offer from T. Coleman du Pont to purchase the property around the falls and donate it to the state. He also suggested the creation of Carter Caves State Resort Park in his home county.

Fields' political enemies charged him with corruption and chastised him for issuing too many pardons. He also drew criticism for appointing his eldest son as state examiner, political supporter James Brown as tax commissioner, and other relatives and political supporters to low-ranking positions in the state government. Although the party strongly supported Alben Barkley's senatorial bid in 1926, Fields and his allies refused to support 1927 gubernatorial candidate J. C. W. Beckham, and the governorship went to Republican Flem D. Sampson.

== Later life and death ==
Following his service as governor, Fields returned to Olive Hill and was admitted to the bar in 1927. Sensing an opportunity for a political comeback in 1930, Fields launched a bid to regain his former seat in the U.S. House, which was now occupied by Republican Elva R. Kendall. Kendall had beaten Fields's successor, Fred M. Vinson in the 1928 Hoover landslide, which saw nine out of eleven (all but the two ancestrally Democratic western Kentucky) U.S. House seats go to the Republicans.

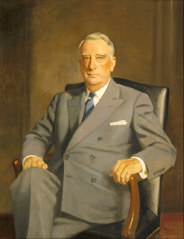
Fred Vinson, Fields' one-time ally and successor in Congress and eventual opponent in 1930 and 1934. He would later become U.S. Treasury Secretary and Chief Justice of the United States.

Vinson instead chose not to stand aside for his former ally and decisively beat Fields in the August Democratic primary by a margin of 63% to 21% (with a third candidate, W.C. Hamilton taking the remaining 16%). Vinson successfully reclaimed his seat in the general election from Kendall.

In 1932, Fields was elected Commonwealth's Attorney for Kentucky's thirty-seventh judicial district; he served until 1935. In 1934, Fields again challenged Congressman Vinson in the Democratic primary in the renumbered 8th district, but he lost again by a decisive margin of 68% to 32%. In 1936, Governor A. B. "Happy" Chandler appointed him to the State Workmen's Compensation Board. He served in this capacity until the election of Republican Simeon S. Willis.

Fields retired from public service on August 8, 1944. From 1940 to 1945, he co-owned an insurance agency. He briefly moved to Florida before returning to Olive Hill, where he continued practicing law, and farming. He died in Grayson, Kentucky on October 21, 1954, and was buried in Olive Hill Cemetery in Olive Hill.

Party political offices
Preceded by J. Campbell Cantrill	Democratic nominee for Governor of Kentucky; 1923	Succeeded by J. C. W. Beckham
U.S. House of Representatives
Preceded by Joseph B. Bennett	Member of the U.S. House of Representatives from Kentucky's 9th congressional district 1911-1923	Succeeded by Fred M. Vinson
Political offices
Preceded by Edwin P. Morrow	Governor of Kentucky; 1923–1927	Succeeded by Flem D. Sampson
