= Washington and Lee Mock Convention =

Simulated presidential nominating convention

- Abbreviation: Mock Con
- Formation: 1908
- Type: Nonprofit Organization
- Location: Lexington, VA, United States
- Members: 95% of the student body
- Website: www.mockconvention.com

Washington and Lee Mock Convention is a simulated presidential nominating convention and is held every four years, during the early stages of the U.S. Presidential Primary, at Washington and Lee University. Although Oberlin College has the distinction of having the oldest student-run mock political convention in the country, W&L's convention has the reputation for being the most accurate. It often receives gavel-to-gavel coverage on C-SPAN.

The convention simulates the nomination process for whichever party does not currently hold the presidency. Since its inception in 1908, the student body has been correct 21 out of 28 times, with only three incorrect predictions since 1948. Since 1948, they have never incorrectly predicted the Republican nominee for president.

The 2008 Mock Convention projected Hillary Clinton as the Democratic nominee for that election year. The Mock Convention was mistaken, however, as Barack Obama was eventually elected as the nominee. The 2012 Mock Convention projected Mitt Romney as the Republican nominee. In 2016, the Mock Convention projected Donald Trump would be the Republican nominee on the first ballot. In 2020, the Washington and Lee Mock Convention predicted incorrectly again, predicting Bernie Sanders would win the nomination, after his early victory in New Hampshire. Sanders dropped out of the race in April 2020, and former Vice President Joe Biden would go on to win the nomination and the election. In 2024, which was again a Republican mock convention, the Mock Convention again correctly predicted that Donald Trump would be the Republican nominee; Trump would go on to be elected to his second term in November 2024.

== Organization history ==
In the spring of 1908, William Jennings Bryan, a front-runner for the Democratic presidential candidacy, announced a visit to Lexington, Virginia, arousing interest in Washington and Lee's already political-minded campus. To capitalize on the furor, The Forum, W&L's leading political organization at the time, organized a replica of the upcoming Democratic Convention. The event was an enormous success, owing to the highly political student body: according to the Lexington Gazette, "The young gentlemen entered into the meeting with the zest of seasoned politicians plus the enthusiasm of collegians". After fierce (and occasionally chaotic) debate, the campus correctly predicted Bryan to be the 1908 Democratic nominee.

With the exception of the 1920 and 1944 elections, the Mock Convention has occurred every four years since the original 1908 election. The state delegations are known to go to great lengths for accuracy: the 1952 state chair for California, David Constine, developed a correspondence with California Governor Earl Warren, one of the leading candidates. As it rose in prominence, the convention gathered an impressive docket of speakers, including Harry S. Truman and former Vice President Alben W. Barkley. Delivering the April 30, 1956 keynote address in Doremus Gymnasium, broadcast live on the radio, then-Sen. Barkley, vice president during President Truman's 1949-53 term, who had been reelected to the Senate in 1954 without seniority as Kentucky's junior senator after previously serving as Majority Leader, was good-naturedly recounting this rise and fall from lowly congressman to senator to Leader to President of the Senate as vice president to return as a backbencher, when he suddenly collapsed from a heart attack and died; his last words, paraphrased from Psalm 84:10, were: "I would rather be a servant in the house of the Lord than to sit in the seats of the mighty!" Since then, the motto of Mock Convention has been a slight alteration of these last words, "It is better to be of service than to sit in the seats of the mighty."

In addition to the convention itself, W&L hosts a large number of formal and informal celebrations in honor of the Convention and its honored guests, including parades, parties, and balls. These events have seen some of the Convention's most famous stories. In 1972, then-governor Jimmy Carter's speech at Mock Con was missed by his own press secretary, who had been celebrating with a group of W&L students and alumni. Before his famous MTV appearance, Bill Clinton played an impromptu concert for students at an off-campus party for the 1988 Convention. By 1996, the Mock Convention was acknowledged by The Washington Post as "one of the nation's oldest and most prestigious mock conventions."

== Prediction history ==
Year	Party	Mock Convention Nominee	National Convention Nominee	Election Winner
1908	Dem	William Jennings Bryan	William Jennings Bryan	William Howard Taft
1912	Dem	Judson Harmon	Woodrow Wilson	Woodrow Wilson
1916	Rep	Charles Evans Hughes	Charles Evans Hughes	Woodrow Wilson
1920	Rep	not held	Warren G. Harding	Warren G. Harding
1924	Dem	John W. Davis	John W. Davis	Calvin Coolidge
1928	Dem	Al Smith	Al Smith	Herbert Hoover
1932	Dem	Franklin D. Roosevelt	Franklin D. Roosevelt	Franklin D. Roosevelt
1936	Rep	Arthur Vandenberg	Alf Landon	Franklin D. Roosevelt
1940	Rep	Charles L. McNary	Wendell Willkie	Franklin D. Roosevelt
1944	Rep	not held	Thomas E. Dewey	Franklin D. Roosevelt
1948	Rep	Arthur Vandenberg	Thomas E. Dewey	Harry S. Truman
1952	Rep	Dwight D. Eisenhower	Dwight D. Eisenhower	Dwight D. Eisenhower
1956	Dem	Adlai Stevenson	Adlai Stevenson	Dwight D. Eisenhower
1960	Dem	John F. Kennedy	John F. Kennedy	John F. Kennedy
1964	Rep	Barry Goldwater	Barry Goldwater	Lyndon B. Johnson
1968	Rep	Richard Nixon	Richard Nixon	Richard Nixon
1972	Dem	Ted Kennedy	George McGovern	Richard Nixon
1976	Dem	Jimmy Carter	Jimmy Carter	Jimmy Carter
1980	Rep	Ronald Reagan	Ronald Reagan	Ronald Reagan
1984	Dem	Walter Mondale	Walter Mondale	Ronald Reagan
1988	Dem	Michael Dukakis	Michael Dukakis	George H. W. Bush
1992	Dem	Bill Clinton	Bill Clinton	Bill Clinton
1996	Rep	Bob Dole	Bob Dole	Bill Clinton
2000	Rep	George W. Bush	George W. Bush	George W. Bush
2004	Dem	John Kerry	John Kerry	George W. Bush
2008	Dem	Hillary Clinton	Barack Obama	Barack Obama
2012	Rep	Mitt Romney	Mitt Romney	Barack Obama
2016	Rep	Donald Trump	Donald Trump	Donald Trump
2020	Dem	Bernie Sanders	Joe Biden	Joe Biden
2024	Rep	Donald Trump	Donald Trump	Donald Trump
