= William P. Kimball =

American politician

William Preston Kimball
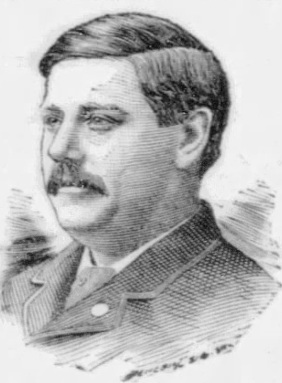

Member of the U.S. House of Representatives from Kentucky's 7th district
- In office March 4, 1907 – March 4, 1909
- Preceded by: South Trimble
- Succeeded by: J. Campbell Cantrill

Member of the Kentucky House of Representatives from Fayette County
- In office August 6, 1883 – August 3, 1885
- Preceded by: J. S. Phelps
- Succeeded by: Hart Boswell

Personal details
- Born: December 4, 1857 Lexington, Kentucky
- Died: February 24, 1926 (aged 68) Lexington, Kentucky
- Resting place: Lexington Cemetery; Lexington, Kentucky
- Party: Democratic
- Education: Transylvania University

William Preston Kimball (November 4, 1857 – February 24, 1926) was a U.S. representative from Kentucky.

Born near East Hickman, Kentucky (now part of Lexington), Kimball attended public and private schools before attending Transylvania University to study law. He served as a member of the Kentucky House of Representatives from 1883 to 1884. He then served as City clerk from 1889 to 1890. He was admitted to the bar in 1891 and commenced practice in Lexington. He served as City attorney of Lexington from October 1891 to January 1, 1901. He then served as prosecuting attorney of Fayette County from January 1, 1901, to March 4, 1907, when he resigned, having been elected to Congress.

Kimball was elected as a Democrat to the Sixtieth Congress as a representative from Kentucky's 7th congressional district. He ran again in 1908, but lost the nomination to J. Campbell Cantrill. He resumed practicing law in Lexington.

He died in Lexington, Kentucky on February 24, 1926. He was interred in Lexington Cemetery.

U.S. House of Representatives
Preceded by South Trimble	Member of the U.S. House of Representatives from Kentucky's 7th congressional district 1907–1909	Succeeded by J. Campbell Cantrill
