= 1923 Kentucky gubernatorial election =

- November 6, 1923
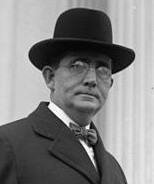

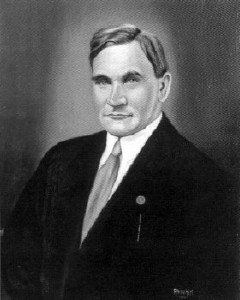
Nominee	William J. Fields	Charles I. Dawson
Party	Democratic	Republican
Popular vote	356,045	306,277
Percentage	53.25%	45.81%
- Fields: 40–50% 50–60% 60–70% 70–80% 80–90% Dawson: 40–50% 50–60% 60–70% 70–80% 80–90%
Governor before election
Edwin P. Morrow
Republican
Elected Governor
William J. Fields
Democratic

The 1923 Kentucky gubernatorial election was held on November 6, 1923. Democratic nominee William J. Fields defeated Republican nominee Charles I. Dawson, the attorney general, with 53.25% of the vote. The Democratic State Central Executive Committee chose Fields to replace nominee J. Campbell Cantrill, a U.S. representative who died suddenly on September 2 two months before the election.

== Primary elections ==
Primary elections were held on August 4, 1923.

=== Democratic primary ===
==== Candidates ====
- J. Campbell Cantrill, U.S. Representative
- Alben W. Barkley, U.S. Representative

==== Results ====
Results by county: Cantrill: 50–60%; 60–70%; 70–80%; 80–90%; 90–100%; Barkley: 50–60%; 60–70%; 70–80%; 80–90%; 90–100%

Democratic primary results
Party	Candidate	Votes	%
Democratic	J. Campbell Cantrill	124,994	51.88
Democratic	Alben W. Barkley	115,933	48.12
Total votes		240,927	100.00

== General election ==
=== Candidates ===
Major party candidates

- William J. Fields, Democratic
- Charles I. Dawson, Republican

Other candidates

- William S. Demuth, Farmer–Labor
- M. A. Brinkmar, Socialist

=== Results ===
1923 Kentucky gubernatorial election
Party	Candidate	Votes	%	±%
Democratic	William J. Fields	356,045	53.25%	+7.96%
Republican	Charles I. Dawson	306,277	45.81%	−8.01%
Farmer–Labor	William S. Demuth	3,606	0.54%	N/A
Socialist	M. A. Brinkmar	2,647	0.40%	−0.49%
Majority		49,768	7.44%	
Turnout				
Democratic gain from Republican		Swing		
