= Charles I. Dawson =

American judge (1881–1969)

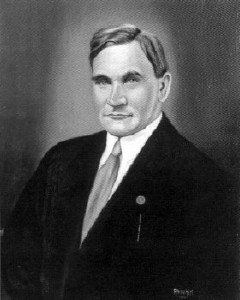
- Judicial portrait of Dawson, 1934, by John Rhinehart.

Judge of the United States District Court for the Western District of Kentucky
- In office January 13, 1925 – June 30, 1935
- Appointed by: Calvin Coolidge
- Preceded by: Charles Harwood Moorman
- Succeeded by: Elwood Hamilton

27th Attorney General of Kentucky
- In office 1920–1923
- Governor: Edwin P. Morrow
- Preceded by: Charles H. Morris
- Succeeded by: Thomas Burnett McGregor

Member of the Kentucky House of Representatives from the 20th district
- In office January 1, 1906 – January 1, 1908
- Preceded by: James F. Rogers
- Succeeded by: John Feland

Personal details
- Born: Charles Irving Dawson; February 13, 1881 Logan County, Kentucky, U.S.
- Died: April 24, 1969 (aged 88) Pewee Valley, Kentucky, U.S.
- Resting place: Cave Hill Cemetery; Louisville, Kentucky
- Party: Democratic (until 1909); Republican (from 1909)
- Education: University of Kentucky read law

Charles Irving Dawson (February 13, 1881 – April 24, 1969) was a United States district judge of the United States District Court for the Western District of Kentucky. He also served in the state legislature. He was a Democrat until 1909 when he joined the Republican Party.

== Education and career ==
Born on February 13, 1881, in Logan County, Kentucky, Dawson attended the University of Kentucky and read law in 1905. He entered private practice in Russellville, Kentucky from 1905 to 1906. He continued in private practice in Pineville, Kentucky starting in 1906. He was a member of the Kentucky House of Representatives in 1906. He was the county attorney of Bell County from 1910 through 1919. and Attorney General of Kentucky from 1920 through 1923. He was the Republican nominee for governor in 1923, losing to Democrat William J. Fields. From 1925 to 1935 he was U.S. District Judge for the Western District of Kentucky. He resigned to return to the practice of law and was the Republican nominee for U.S. senator in 1950, losing to Democratic Gov. Earle C. Clements. Dawson was a member of the Democratic Party until 1909, and a member of the Republican Party from 1909.

== Federal judicial service ==
Dawson was nominated by President Calvin Coolidge on January 2, 1925, to a seat on the United States District Court for the Western District of Kentucky vacated by Judge Charles H. Moorman. He was confirmed by the United States Senate on January 13, 1925, and received his commission the same day. His service terminated on June 30, 1935, due to his resignation.

== Later career and death ==
Dawson resumed private practice in Louisville, Kentucky from 1935 to 1969. He died on April 24, 1969, in Pewee Valley, Kentucky. He was interred in Cave Hill Cemetery in Louisville.

== Unsuccessful political campaigns ==
In 1923 Dawson, still serving as attorney general, was the Republican nominee for Governor of Kentucky. The Democratic nominee, J. Campbell Cantrill, suddenly died that September, after defeating Alben Barkley for the nomination. Democrat William J. Fields quickly replaced Cantrill on the ticket after Barkley declined the nomination. Dawson lost the general election to Fields, winning 306,277 votes (46.2%) to Fields' 356.035 (53.8%).

In 1950 Dawson was the Republican nominee for a seat in the United States Senate. Dawson lost that race to Democrat Earle C. Clements, who won 300,276 votes (53.9%) to Dawson's 256,876 (46.1%). Clements went on to become the assistant majority floor leader under Lyndon B. Johnson, serving as Majority Leader of the United States Senate during Johnson's extended absence for medical reasons.

== Sources ==
- Kleber, John E.; Kentucky, University Press of; Policy, Institute for Regional Analysis and Public; Library, Camden-Carroll; University, Morehead State (19 February 2019). "The Kentucky Encyclopedia". www.kyenc.org.

Party political offices
| Preceded by Edwin P. Morrow | Republican nominee for Governor of Kentucky; 1923 | Succeeded by Flem D. Sampson |
| Preceded by James Park | Republican nominee for United States Senator from Kentucky (Class 3); 1950 (special), 1950 | Succeeded by Thruston Ballard Morton |
Legal offices
| Preceded by Charles H. Morris | Attorney General of Kentucky; 1920–1923 | Succeeded by T. B. McGregor |
| Preceded by Charles Harwood Moorman | Judge of the United States District Court for the Western District of Kentucky; 1925–1935 | Succeeded by Elwood Hamilton |
