= Statue of Alben W. Barkley =

Bronze sculpture of Alben W. Barkley

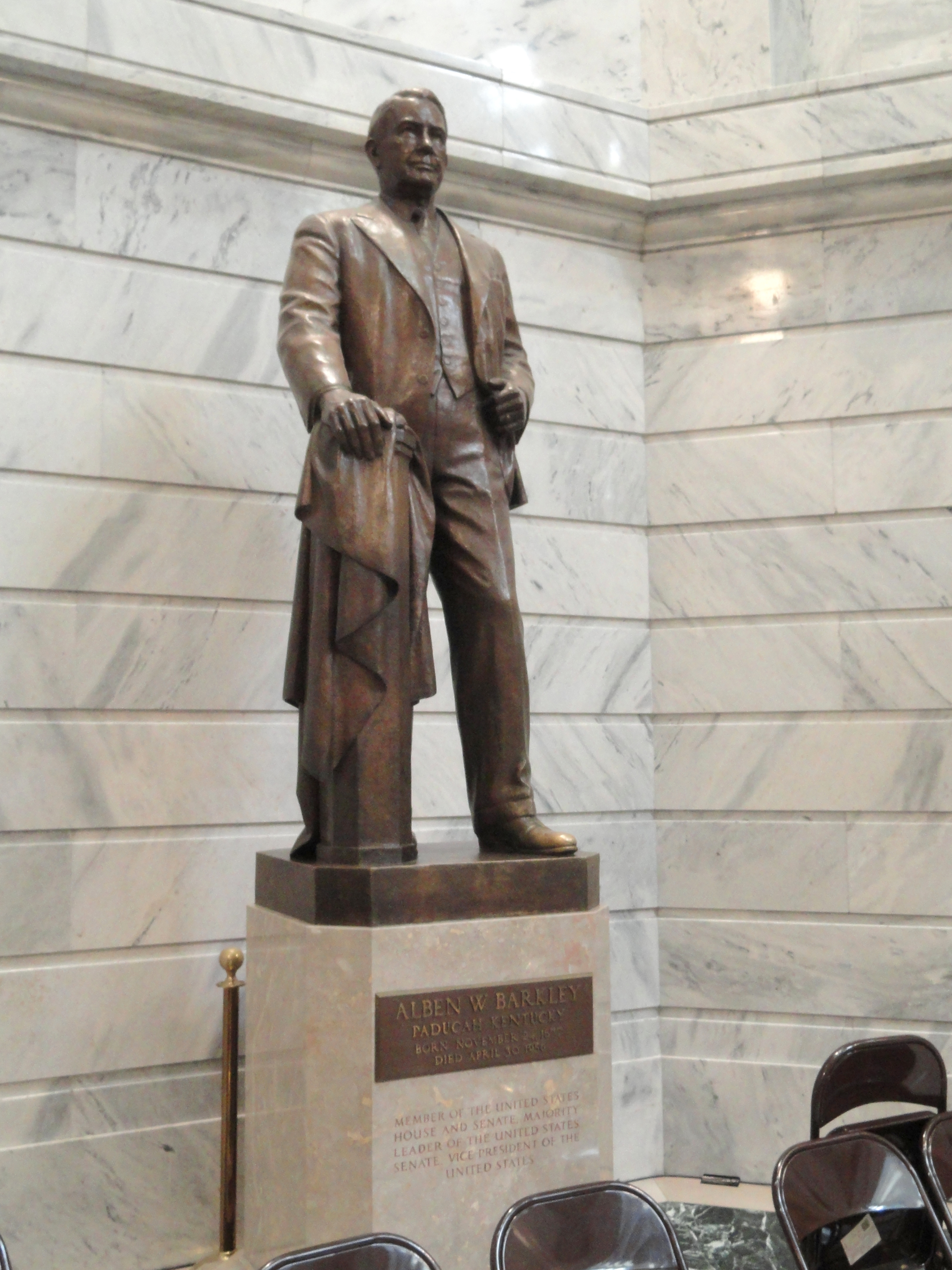
- The statue in 2012
- Artist: Walker Hancock
- Medium: Bronze sculpture
- Subject: Alben W. Barkley
- Location: Kentucky State Capitol; Frankfort, Kentucky, U.S.

On October 3, 1963, a bronze sculpture of Alben W. Barkley, the 35th vice president of the United States, was installed in the Kentucky State Capitol, in Frankfort, Kentucky, United States. It was the last large statue installed in the Kentucky Capitol at a cost of $50,000. The sculptor was Walker Hancock, and the bronze statue was cast in Rome. In the Capitol, it was installed on a base of St. Genevieve marble.
