= J. Campbell Cantrill =

American politician (1870–1923)

James Campbell Cantrill
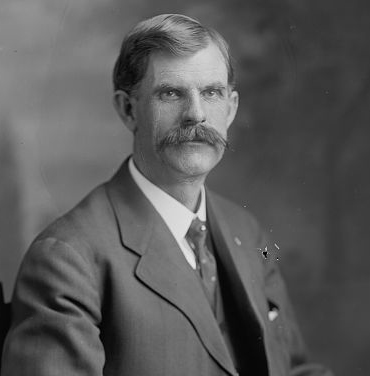

Member of the U.S. House of Representatives from Kentucky's 7th district
- In office March 4, 1909 – September 2, 1923
- Preceded by: William P. Kimball
- Succeeded by: Joseph W. Morris

Member of the Kentucky Senate from the 22nd district
- In office January 1, 1902 – January 1, 1906
- Preceded by: Thomas R. Welch
- Succeeded by: John W. Newman

Member of the Kentucky House of Representatives from the 58th district
- In office January 1, 1898 – January 1, 1902
- Preceded by: J. A. Hamon
- Succeeded by: R. S. Hearne

Personal details
- Born: July 9, 1870 Georgetown, Kentucky, U.S.
- Died: September 2, 1923 (aged 53) Louisville, Kentucky, U.S.
- Resting place: Georgetown Cemetery; Georgetown, Kentucky
- Party: Democratic
- Spouses: Carrie Payne (1872-1913) m. 1895; Ethel Gist (1876-1954) m. June 26, 1918
- Children: James Edward Cantrill, Jr. (1897–1944)
- Education: University of Virginia at Charlottesville
- Profession: Farmer

James Campbell Cantrill (July 9, 1870 – September 2, 1923) was a U.S. representative from Kentucky.

== Background ==
Born in Georgetown, Kentucky to Jennie Moore and James Edward Campbell, Cantrill attended the common schools, Georgetown (Kentucky) College, and the University of Virginia at Charlottesville. He engaged in agricultural pursuits until his death.

== Political career ==
He served as chairman of the Scott County Democratic committee in 1895.

Cantrill was elected a member of the State house of representatives in 1897, and again in 1899. He served in the State senate from 1902 to 1906. He was nominated for Congress in 1904, but declined. He served as delegate to the Democratic National Convention in 1904.

Cantrill was elected president of the American Society of Equity for Kentucky, an organization of farmers, in 1908.

Cantrill was elected as a Democrat to the Sixty-first and to the seven succeeding Congresses and served from March 4, 1909, until his death during his campaign as the Democratic nominee for Governor of Kentucky. He served as chairman of the Committee on Industrial Arts and Expositions (Sixty-fourth and Sixty-fifth Congresses).

== Death ==
He died in Louisville, Kentucky in 1923 while campaigning as the Democratic nominee for governor.

He was interred in Georgetown Cemetery, in Georgetown, Kentucky.

== See also ==
- List of members of the United States Congress who died in office (1900–1949)

Party political offices
| Preceded by James D. Black | Democratic nominee for Governor of Kentucky; 1923 | Succeeded by William J. Fields |
U.S. House of Representatives
| Preceded by William P. Kimball | Member of the U.S. House of Representatives from Kentucky's 7th congressional district 1909–1923 | Succeeded by Joseph W. Morris |
