= James Holland =

James or Jim Holland may refer to:

== Law and politics ==
- James Holland (North Carolina politician) (1754–1823), U.S. Congressman from the state of North Carolina
- James V. Holland (1835–1916), American politician and businessman
- James Job Holland (1841–1922), Liberal Party Member of Parliament in Auckland, New Zealand
- James Buchanan Holland (1857–1914), U.S. federal judge
- James Holland (New Hampshire politician) (1938–2020), American politician in New Hampshire

== Others ==
- James Holland (artist) (1800–1870), English landscape painter
- James C. Holland (1853–1919), American architect in Kansas
- James P. Holland (1865–1941), American president of the New York State Federation of Labor
- James F. Holland (1925–2018), American physician and cancer researcher
- James Holland (percussionist) (1933–2022), English percussionist
- James Phillip Holland (1934–1998), American endocrinologist and professor
- Jim Holland (ski jumper) (born 1967), American ski jumper
- James Holland (author) (born 1970), British historian, author and broadcaster
- James Holland (soccer) (born 1989), Australian football (soccer) player
- James Holland (Texas Ranger), American serial killer investigator
