= 1954 United States Senate election in Kentucky =

- November 2, 1954
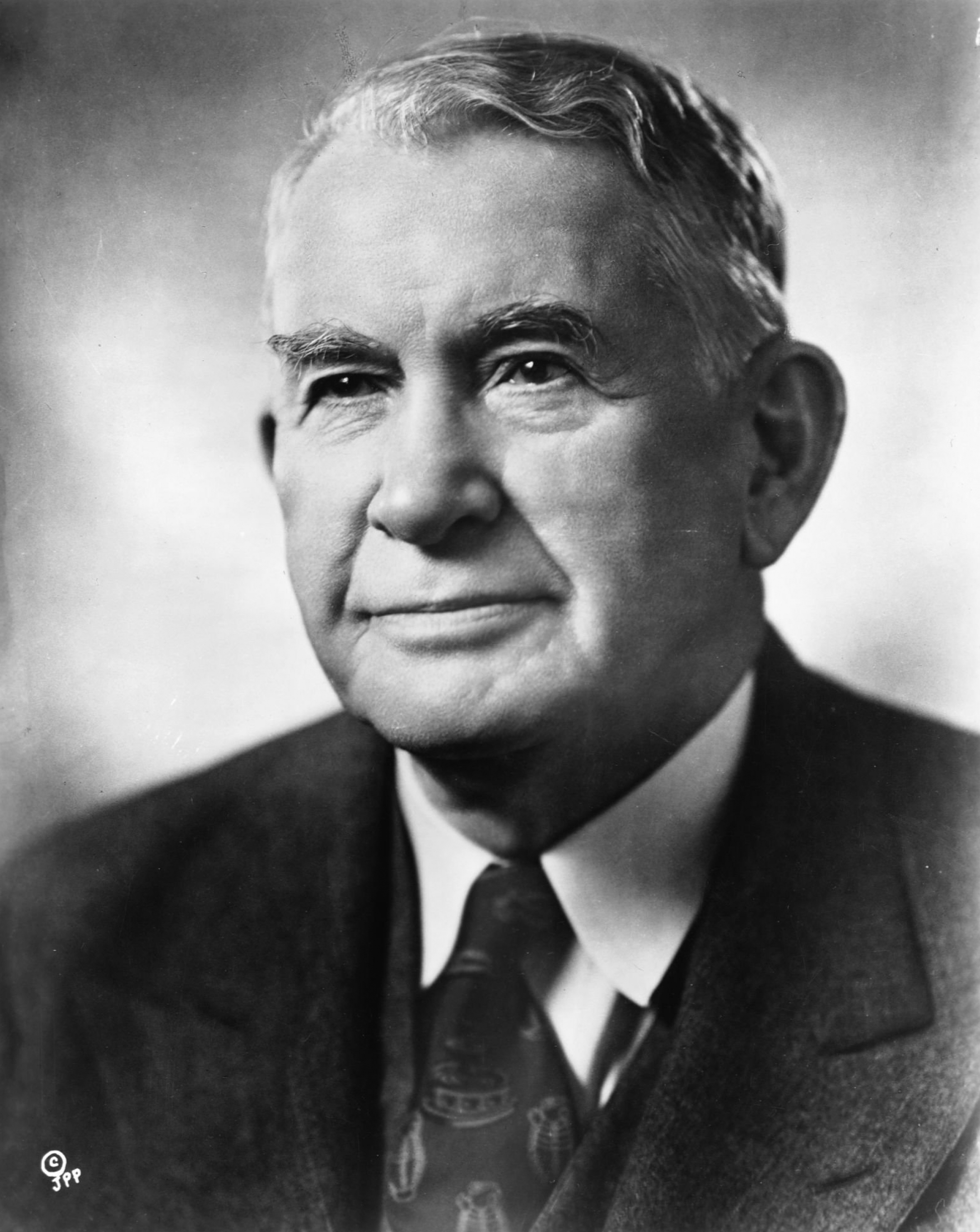

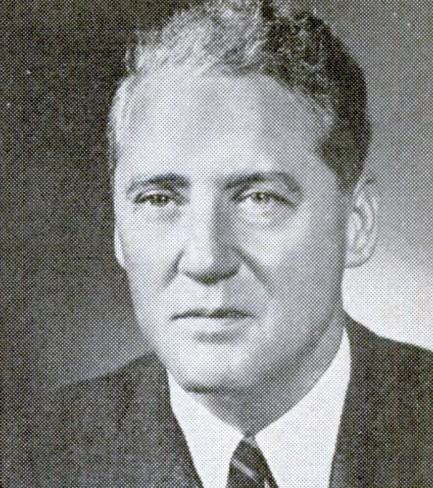
Nominee	Alben W. Barkley	John Sherman Cooper
Party	Democratic	Republican
Popular vote	434,109	362,948
Percentage	54.46%	45.54%
- County results Barkley: 50–60% 60–70% 70–80% 80–90% Cooper: 50–60% 60–70% 70–80% 80–90%
U.S. senator before election
John Sherman Cooper
Republican
Elected U.S. Senator
Alben Barkley
Democratic

The 1954 United States Senate election in Kentucky took place on November 2, 1954. Incumbent Republican Senator John Sherman Cooper, who won a 1952 special election to fill the vacant seat of Virgil Chapman, ran for a full term in office but was defeated by Democratic former Senator and Vice President of the United States Alben W. Barkley.

== General election ==
=== Candidates ===
- Alben Barkley, former Vice President of the United States and U.S. Senator
- John Sherman Cooper, incumbent Senator since 1952 (Note: Cooper previously served as Senator from 1946 to 1949.)

=== Results ===
1954 U.S. Senate election in Kentucky
Party	Candidate	Votes	%
Democratic	Alben Barkley	434,109	54.46%
Republican	John Sherman Cooper (incumbent)	362,948	45.54%
Total votes		797,057	100.00%

== Aftermath ==
Following his victory, Barkley served a little over a year before dying of a heart attack on April 30, 1956. Cooper won the November special election to succeed him and returned to the Senate.

== See also ==
- 1954 United States Senate elections
