= 1956 United States Senate special election in Kentucky =

- November 6, 1956
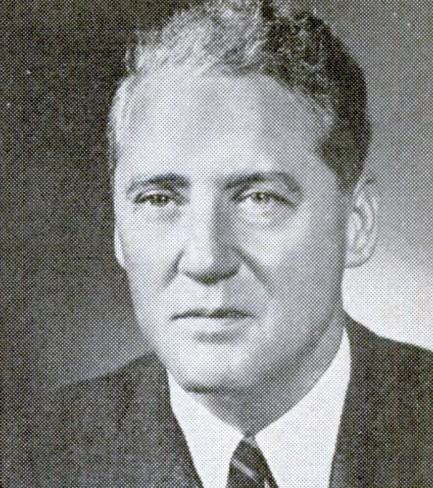

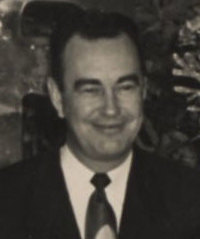
Nominee	John Sherman Cooper	Lawrence Wetherby
Party	Republican	Democratic
Popular vote	538,505	473,140
Percentage	53.23%	46.77%
- County results Sherman: 50–60% 60–70% 70–80% 80–90% Wetherby: 50–60% 60–70% 70–80%
U.S. senator before election
Robert Humphreys
Democratic
Elected U.S. Senator
John Sherman Cooper
Republican

The 1956 United States Senate special election in Kentucky was held on November 6, 1956, to fill the vacant seat left by Alben Barkley. Former Senator John Sherman Cooper was elected to complete the term ending in 1961, defeating Democratic former Governor Lawrence Wetherby.

== Background ==
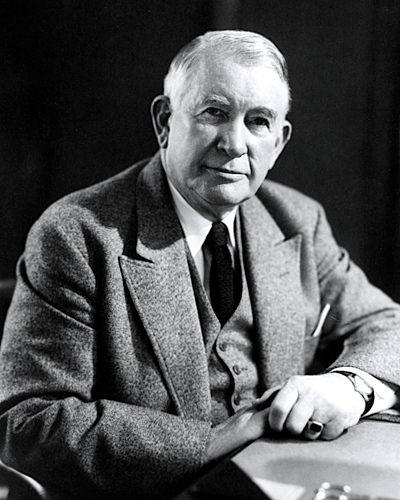
Senator Alben Barkley, whose death precipitated the special election.

Alben Barkley served as U.S. Senator from Kentucky from 1927 to 1949 and Vice President of the United States from 1949 to 1953. After leaving the vice presidency in 1953, he was elected to the Senate for the term ending in 1961, defeating incumbent John Sherman Cooper in 1954. (Note: Cooper himself had won two prior special elections in 1946 (to succeed Happy Chandler, who resigned to become Commissioner of Baseball) and 1952 (to succeed Virgil Chapman, who died).)

On April 30, 1956, Barkley died of a heart attack during a speech at Washington and Lee University. Governor Happy Chandler appointed Robert Humphreys to fill the vacant seat until a successor could be duly elected to complete the remainder of Barkley's term.

Former Senator Cooper, who was serving as Ambassador to India, resigned his post to run for his old seat at the request of President Eisenhower.

== General election ==
=== Candidates ===
- John Sherman Cooper, U.S. Ambassador to India and former U.S. Senator (1946–1949 and 1952–1955) (Republican)
- Lawrence Wetherby, former Governor of Kentucky (1950–1955) (Democratic)

=== Results ===
1956 U.S. Senate election in Kentucky
Party	Candidate	Votes	%
Republican	John Sherman Cooper	538,505	53.23%
Democratic	Lawrence Wetherby	473,140	46.77%
Total votes		1,011,645	100.00%

== See also ==
1956 United States Senate elections
