= 1952 United States Senate special election in Kentucky =

- November 4, 1952
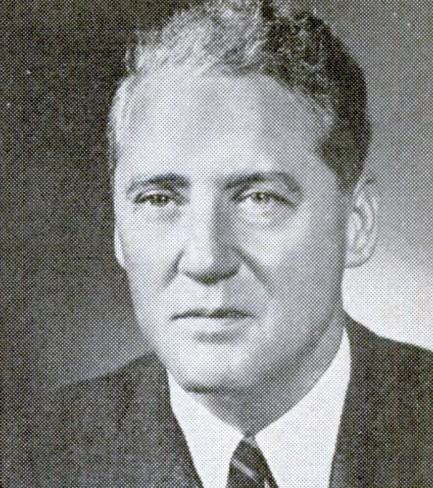

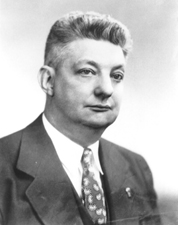
Nominee	John Sherman Cooper	Thomas R. Underwood
Party	Republican	Democratic
Popular vote	494,576	465,652
Percentage	51.51%	48.49%
- County results Cooper: 50–60% 60–70% 70–80% 80–90% Underwood: 50–60% 60–70% 70–80% 80–90%
U.S. senator before election
Thomas R. Underwood
Democratic
Elected U.S. Senator
John Sherman Cooper
Republican

The 1952 United States Senate special election in Kentucky was held on November 4, 1952, to complete the unexpired term of the late Senator Virgil Chapman. Interim Senator Thomas R. Underwood ran to complete the term but was defeated by Republican former Senator John Sherman Cooper.

== Background ==
Incumbent Senator Virgil Chapman died on March 8, 1951. Governor Lawrence Wetherby appointed Thomas R. Underwood to fill the vacant seat until a successor could be duly elected. The special election was scheduled for November 4, 1952, concurrent with the general election for president and United States House of Representatives.

== General election ==
=== Candidates ===
- John Sherman Cooper, U.S. State Department official and former Senator (1946–1949)
- Thomas R. Underwood, interim U.S. Senator since 1951

=== Results ===
1952 U.S. Senate special election in Kentucky
Party	Candidate	Votes	%
Republican	John Sherman Cooper	494,576	51.51%
Democratic	Thomas R. Underwood (incumbent)	465,652	48.49%
Total votes		960,228	100.00%

== See also ==
- 1952 United States Senate elections
