= 1966 United States Senate election in Kentucky =

- November 8, 1966
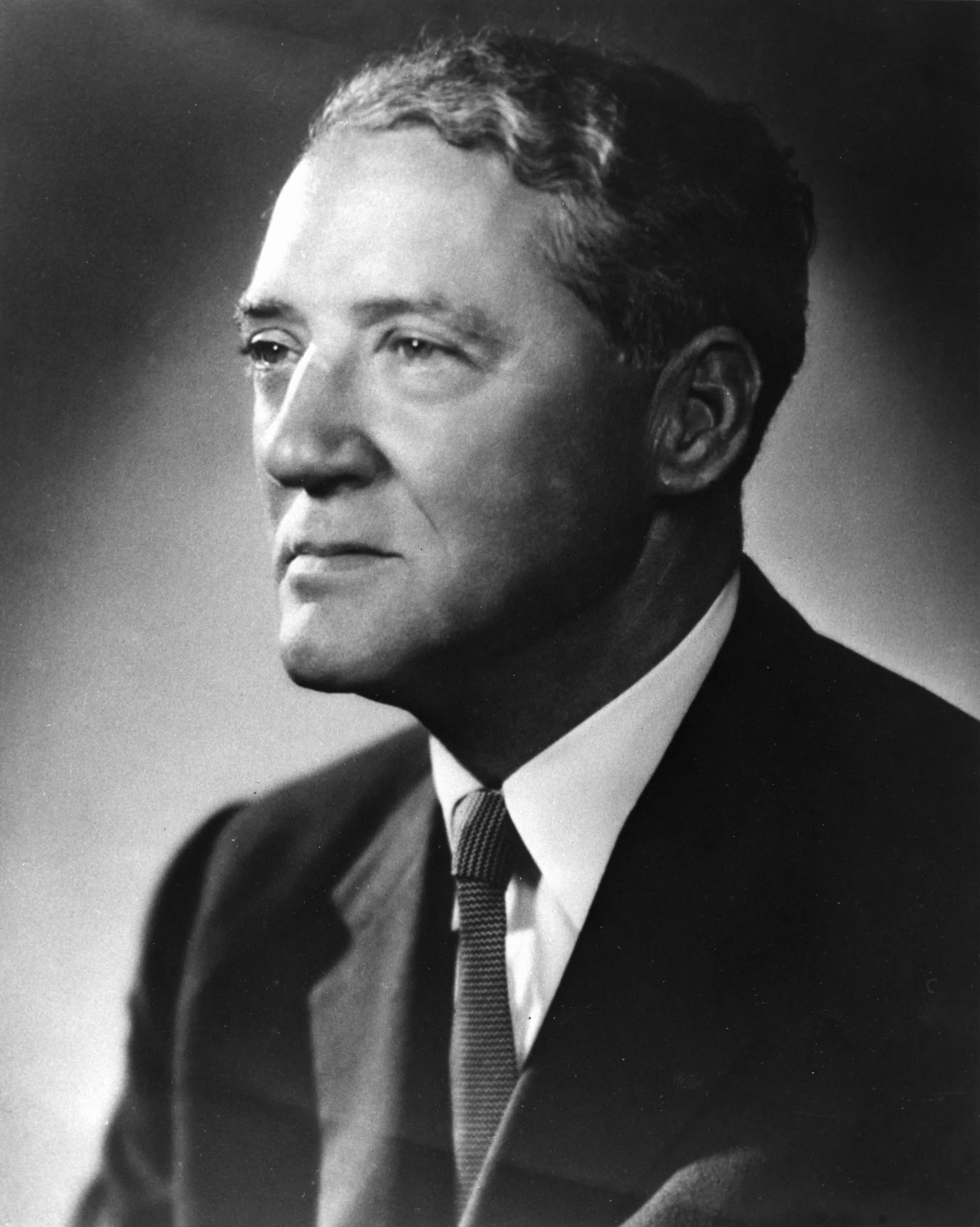

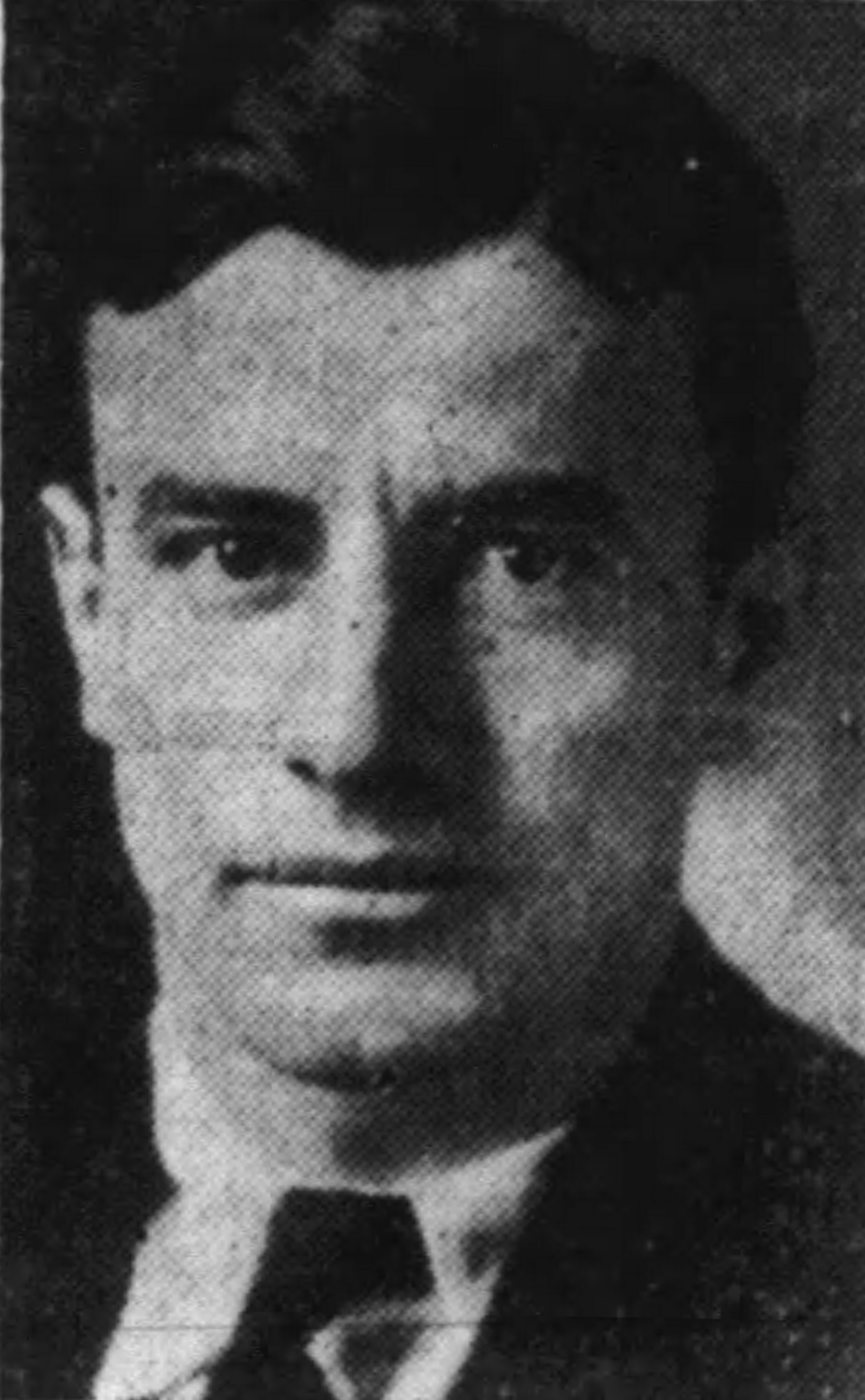
| Nominee | John Sherman Cooper | John Y. Brown Sr. |
| Party | Republican | Democratic |
| Popular vote | 483,805 | 266,079 |
| Percentage | 64.52% | 35.48% |
- County results Cooper: 50–60% 60–70% 70–80% 80–90% Brown: 50–60% 60–70%
U.S. senator before election
John Sherman Cooper
Republican
Elected U.S. Senator
John Sherman Cooper
Republican

The 1966 United States Senate election in Kentucky took place on November 8, 1966. Incumbent Republican Senator John Sherman Cooper was elected to a second consecutive term in office, (Note: Cooper had served three partial non-consecutive terms from 1946–1949, 1952–1955, and 1957–1961 and one full term beginning in 1961.) defeating Democrat John Y. Brown Sr. in a rematch of the 1946 special election. This would be the first statewide election in Kentucky in which a Republican won Elliott County, and the only one until 2016 when Donald Trump won the county for president.

== Republican primary ==
=== Candidates ===
- John Sherman Cooper, incumbent Senator since 1957
- Thurman Jerome Hamlin, perennial candidate from London
- Sam M. Ward

=== Results ===
Republican Primary results
| Party | Candidate | Votes | % |
|---|---|---|---|
| Republican | John Sherman Cooper (incumbent) | 65,023 | 92.80% |
| Republican | Sam M. Ward | 2,927 | 4.18% |
| Republican | W. Howard Clay | 2,120 | 3.03% |
| Total votes | | 70,070 | 100.00% |

== Democratic primary ==
=== Candidates ===
- John Y. Brown Sr., former U.S. Representative at-large and nominee for Senate in 1946
- Jesse N.R. Cecil
- James Ward Lentz
- Gaines P. Wilson

=== Results ===
Democratic primary results
| Party | Candidate | Votes | % |
|---|---|---|---|
| Democratic | John Y. Brown Sr. | 71,759 | 75.58% |
| Democratic | Gaines P. Wilson | 12,921 | 13.61% |
| Democratic | James Ward Lentz | 5,339 | 5.69% |
| Democratic | Jesse N.R. Cecil | 4,861 | 5.12% |
| Total votes | | 94,940 | 100.00% |

== General election ==
=== Results ===
1966 U.S. Senate election in Kentucky
| Party | Candidate | Votes | % |
|---|---|---|---|
| Republican | John Sherman Cooper (incumbent) | 483,805 | 64.52% |
| Democratic | John Y. Brown Sr. | 266,079 | 35.48% |
| Total votes | | 749,884 | 100.00% |

==== Results by county ====
| County | John Sherman Cooper Republican | | John Young Brown Sr. Democratic | | Margin | | Total votes cast |
| County | # | % | # | % | # | % | Total votes cast |
|---|---|---|---|---|---|---|---|
| Adair | 3,003 | 70.21% | 1,274 | 29.79% | 1,729 | 40.43% | 4,277 |
| Allen | 2,094 | 70.51% | 876 | 29.49% | 1,218 | 41.01% | 2,970 |
| Anderson | 1,799 | 60.27% | 1,186 | 39.73% | 613 | 20.54% | 2,985 |
| Ballard | 1,347 | 54.73% | 1,114 | 45.27% | 233 | 9.47% | 2,461 |
| Barren | 4,194 | 61.24% | 2,655 | 38.76% | 1,539 | 22.47% | 6,849 |
| Bath | 1,591 | 55.92% | 1,254 | 44.08% | 337 | 11.85% | 2,845 |
| Bell | 4,240 | 61.28% | 2,679 | 38.72% | 1,561 | 22.56% | 6,919 |
| Boone | 3,692 | 63.57% | 2,116 | 36.43% | 1,576 | 27.13% | 5,808 |
| Bourbon | 2,051 | 60.01% | 1,367 | 39.99% | 684 | 20.01% | 3,418 |
| Boyd | 8,462 | 62.95% | 4,980 | 37.05% | 3,482 | 25.90% | 13,442 |
| Boyle | 3,368 | 67.16% | 1,647 | 32.84% | 1,721 | 34.32% | 5,015 |
| Bracken | 1,190 | 64.46% | 656 | 35.54% | 534 | 28.93% | 1,846 |
| Breathitt | 1,195 | 34.43% | 2,276 | 65.57% | -1,081 | -31.14% | 3,471 |
| Breckinridge | 2,847 | 60.65% | 1,847 | 39.35% | 1,000 | 21.30% | 4,694 |
| Bullitt | 2,399 | 56.98% | 1,811 | 43.02% | 588 | 13.97% | 4,210 |
| Butler | 2,513 | 81.70% | 563 | 18.30% | 1,950 | 63.39% | 3,076 |
| Caldwell | 2,752 | 69.85% | 1,188 | 30.15% | 1,564 | 39.70% | 3,940 |
| Calloway | 3,244 | 63.68% | 1,850 | 36.32% | 1,394 | 27.37% | 5,094 |
| Campbell | 12,128 | 64.02% | 6,817 | 35.98% | 5,311 | 28.03% | 18,945 |
| Carlisle | 1,417 | 61.08% | 903 | 38.92% | 514 | 22.16% | 2,320 |
| Carroll | 940 | 47.36% | 1,045 | 52.64% | -105 | -5.29% | 1,985 |
| Carter | 3,234 | 66.65% | 1,618 | 33.35% | 1,616 | 33.31% | 4,852 |
| Casey | 3,299 | 80.48% | 800 | 19.52% | 2,499 | 60.97% | 4,099 |
| Christian | 4,394 | 58.96% | 3,058 | 41.04% | 1,336 | 17.93% | 7,452 |
| Clark | 2,850 | 62.97% | 1,676 | 37.03% | 1,174 | 25.94% | 4,526 |
| Clay | 2,802 | 76.68% | 852 | 23.32% | 1,950 | 53.37% | 3,654 |
| Clinton | 2,150 | 84.41% | 397 | 15.59% | 1,753 | 68.83% | 2,547 |
| Crittenden | 1,825 | 70.30% | 771 | 29.70% | 1,054 | 40.60% | 2,596 |
| Cumberland | 1,698 | 80.13% | 421 | 19.87% | 1,277 | 60.26% | 2,119 |
| Daviess | 10,152 | 59.62% | 6,877 | 40.38% | 3,275 | 19.23% | 17,029 |
| Edmonson | 1,878 | 75.48% | 610 | 24.52% | 1,268 | 50.96% | 2,488 |
| Elliott | 846 | 53.85% | 725 | 46.15% | 121 | 7.70% | 1,571 |
| Estill | 2,201 | 67.66% | 1,052 | 32.34% | 1,149 | 35.32% | 3,253 |
| Fayette | 22,374 | 66.27% | 11,390 | 33.73% | 10,984 | 32.53% | 33,764 |
| Fleming | 1,892 | 63.81% | 1,073 | 36.19% | 819 | 27.62% | 2,965 |
| Floyd | 4,890 | 55.98% | 3,846 | 44.02% | 1,044 | 11.95% | 8,736 |
| Franklin | 5,002 | 47.91% | 5,439 | 52.09% | -437 | -4.19% | 10,441 |
| Fulton | 1,406 | 65.49% | 741 | 34.51% | 665 | 30.97% | 2,147 |
| Gallatin | 529 | 51.01% | 508 | 48.99% | 21 | 2.03% | 1,037 |
| Garrard | 2,210 | 67.92% | 1,044 | 32.08% | 1,166 | 35.83% | 3,254 |
| Grant | 1,476 | 61.89% | 909 | 38.11% | 567 | 23.77% | 2,385 |
| Graves | 5,231 | 61.82% | 3,230 | 38.18% | 2,001 | 23.65% | 8,461 |
| Grayson | 3,642 | 72.94% | 1,351 | 27.06% | 2,291 | 45.88% | 4,993 |
| Green | 2,099 | 67.06% | 1,031 | 32.94% | 1,068 | 34.12% | 3,130 |
| Greenup | 4,676 | 61.02% | 2,987 | 38.98% | 1,689 | 22.04% | 7,663 |
| Hancock | 980 | 64.64% | 536 | 35.36% | 444 | 29.29% | 1,516 |
| Hardin | 5,876 | 64.69% | 3,207 | 35.31% | 2,669 | 29.38% | 9,083 |
| Harlan | 6,056 | 69.26% | 2,688 | 30.74% | 3,368 | 38.52% | 8,744 |
| Harrison | 1,905 | 55.56% | 1,524 | 44.44% | 381 | 11.11% | 3,429 |
| Hart | 2,730 | 65.93% | 1,411 | 34.07% | 1,319 | 31.85% | 4,141 |
| Henderson | 3,523 | 54.85% | 2,900 | 45.15% | 623 | 9.70% | 6,423 |
| Henry | 1,625 | 52.30% | 1,482 | 47.70% | 143 | 4.60% | 3,107 |
| Hickman | 1,298 | 69.30% | 575 | 30.70% | 723 | 38.60% | 1,873 |
| Hopkins | 4,534 | 56.85% | 3,442 | 43.15% | 1,092 | 13.69% | 7,976 |
| Jackson | 2,549 | 87.53% | 363 | 12.47% | 2,186 | 75.07% | 2,912 |
| Jefferson | 113,648 | 66.48% | 57,312 | 33.52% | 56,336 | 32.95% | 170,960 |
| Jessamine | 2,379 | 68.76% | 1,081 | 31.24% | 1,298 | 37.51% | 3,460 |
| Johnson | 3,623 | 73.80% | 1,286 | 26.20% | 2,337 | 47.61% | 4,909 |
| Kenton | 16,115 | 67.84% | 7,638 | 32.16% | 8,477 | 35.69% | 23,753 |
| Knott | 1,474 | 43.49% | 1,915 | 56.51% | -441 | -13.01% | 3,389 |
| Knox | 3,884 | 74.35% | 1,340 | 25.65% | 2,544 | 48.70% | 5,224 |
| Larue | 2,052 | 69.16% | 915 | 30.84% | 1,137 | 38.32% | 2,967 |
| Laurel | 4,988 | 78.54% | 1,363 | 21.46% | 3,625 | 57.08% | 6,351 |
| Lawrence | 1,961 | 61.94% | 1,205 | 38.06% | 756 | 23.88% | 3,166 |
| Lee | 1,449 | 68.71% | 660 | 31.29% | 789 | 37.41% | 2,109 |
| Leslie | 2,049 | 82.39% | 438 | 17.61% | 1,611 | 64.78% | 2,487 |
| Letcher | 3,528 | 65.88% | 1,827 | 34.12% | 1,701 | 31.76% | 5,355 |
| Lewis | 2,327 | 75.65% | 749 | 24.35% | 1,578 | 51.30% | 3,076 |
| Lincoln | 2,916 | 66.00% | 1,502 | 34.00% | 1,414 | 32.01% | 4,418 |
| Livingston | 1,483 | 64.06% | 832 | 35.94% | 651 | 28.12% | 2,315 |
| Logan | 2,638 | 46.54% | 3,030 | 53.46% | -392 | -6.92% | 5,668 |
| Lyon | 977 | 62.91% | 576 | 37.09% | 401 | 25.82% | 1,553 |
| Madison | 5,329 | 61.77% | 3,298 | 38.23% | 2,031 | 23.54% | 8,627 |
| Magoffin | 1,605 | 59.69% | 1,084 | 40.31% | 521 | 19.38% | 2,689 |
| Marion | 1,927 | 55.82% | 1,525 | 44.18% | 402 | 11.65% | 3,452 |
| Marshall | 3,465 | 64.75% | 1,886 | 35.25% | 1,579 | 29.51% | 5,351 |
| Martin | 1,446 | 76.11% | 454 | 23.89% | 992 | 52.21% | 1,900 |
| Mason | 2,812 | 66.23% | 1,434 | 33.77% | 1,378 | 32.45% | 4,246 |
| McCracken | 9,039 | 66.21% | 4,612 | 33.79% | 4,427 | 32.43% | 13,651 |
| McCreary | 2,460 | 86.86% | 372 | 13.14% | 2,088 | 73.73% | 2,832 |
| McLean | 1,478 | 55.61% | 1,180 | 44.39% | 298 | 11.21% | 2,658 |
| Meade | 1,823 | 57.85% | 1,328 | 42.15% | 495 | 15.71% | 3,151 |
| Menifee | 710 | 57.68% | 521 | 42.32% | 189 | 15.35% | 1,231 |
| Mercer | 2,695 | 60.93% | 1,728 | 39.07% | 967 | 21.86% | 4,423 |
| Metcalfe | 1,636 | 62.92% | 964 | 37.08% | 672 | 25.85% | 2,600 |
| Monroe | 3,171 | 80.73% | 757 | 19.27% | 2,414 | 61.46% | 3,928 |
| Montgomery | 2,053 | 65.72% | 1,071 | 34.28% | 982 | 31.43% | 3,124 |
| Morgan | 1,254 | 50.38% | 1,235 | 49.62% | 19 | 0.76% | 2,489 |
| Muhlenberg | 4,016 | 56.19% | 3,131 | 43.81% | 885 | 12.38% | 7,147 |
| Nelson | 3,280 | 61.93% | 2,016 | 38.07% | 1,264 | 23.87% | 5,296 |
| Nicholas | 886 | 61.49% | 555 | 38.51% | 331 | 22.97% | 1,441 |
| Ohio | 3,279 | 68.10% | 1,536 | 31.90% | 1,743 | 36.20% | 4,815 |
| Oldham | 1,727 | 60.68% | 1,119 | 39.32% | 608 | 21.36% | 2,846 |
| Owen | 1,042 | 44.10% | 1,321 | 55.90% | -279 | -11.81% | 2,363 |
| Owsley | 980 | 81.46% | 223 | 18.54% | 757 | 62.93% | 1,203 |
| Pendleton | 1,548 | 58.28% | 1,108 | 41.72% | 440 | 16.57% | 2,656 |
| Perry | 4,303 | 65.31% | 2,286 | 34.69% | 2,017 | 30.61% | 6,589 |
| Pike | 8,495 | 52.96% | 7,544 | 47.04% | 951 | 5.93% | 16,039 |
| Powell | 1,277 | 61.04% | 815 | 38.96% | 462 | 22.08% | 2,092 |
| Pulaski | 8,364 | 80.91% | 1,973 | 19.09% | 6,391 | 61.83% | 10,337 |
| Robertson | 394 | 65.89% | 204 | 34.11% | 190 | 31.77% | 598 |
| Rockcastle | 2,841 | 75.80% | 907 | 24.20% | 1,934 | 51.60% | 3,748 |
| Rowan | 2,054 | 64.41% | 1,135 | 35.59% | 919 | 28.82% | 3,189 |
| Russell | 2,592 | 79.98% | 649 | 20.02% | 1,943 | 59.95% | 3,241 |
| Scott | 1,932 | 55.84% | 1,528 | 44.16% | 404 | 11.68% | 3,460 |
| Shelby | 2,504 | 56.63% | 1,918 | 43.37% | 586 | 13.25% | 4,422 |
| Simpson | 1,419 | 61.64% | 883 | 38.36% | 536 | 23.28% | 2,302 |
| Spencer | 849 | 60.08% | 564 | 39.92% | 285 | 20.17% | 1,413 |
| Taylor | 2,563 | 69.74% | 1,112 | 30.26% | 1,451 | 39.48% | 3,675 |
| Todd | 1,514 | 60.01% | 1,009 | 39.99% | 505 | 20.02% | 2,523 |
| Trigg | 1,412 | 57.21% | 1,056 | 42.79% | 356 | 14.42% | 2,468 |
| Trimble | 683 | 43.75% | 878 | 56.25% | -195 | -12.49% | 1,561 |
| Union | 1,788 | 51.86% | 1,660 | 48.14% | 128 | 3.71% | 3,448 |
| Warren | 6,570 | 62.99% | 3,861 | 37.01% | 2,709 | 25.97% | 10,431 |
| Washington | 1,930 | 63.34% | 1,117 | 36.66% | 813 | 26.68% | 3,047 |
| Wayne | 2,642 | 66.13% | 1,353 | 33.87% | 1,289 | 32.27% | 3,995 |
| Webster | 1,801 | 53.46% | 1,568 | 46.54% | 233 | 6.92% | 3,369 |
| Whitley | 5,023 | 77.68% | 1,443 | 22.32% | 3,580 | 55.37% | 6,466 |
| Wolfe | 1,100 | 65.13% | 589 | 34.87% | 511 | 30.25% | 1,689 |
| Woodford | 2,305 | 64.62% | 1,262 | 35.38% | 1,043 | 29.24% | 3,567 |
| Totals | 483,805 | 64.52% | 266,079 | 35.48% | 217,726 | 29.03% | 749,884 |

== See also ==
- 1966 United States Senate elections
