= John Y. Brown Sr. =

American politician (1900–1985)

John Y. Brown
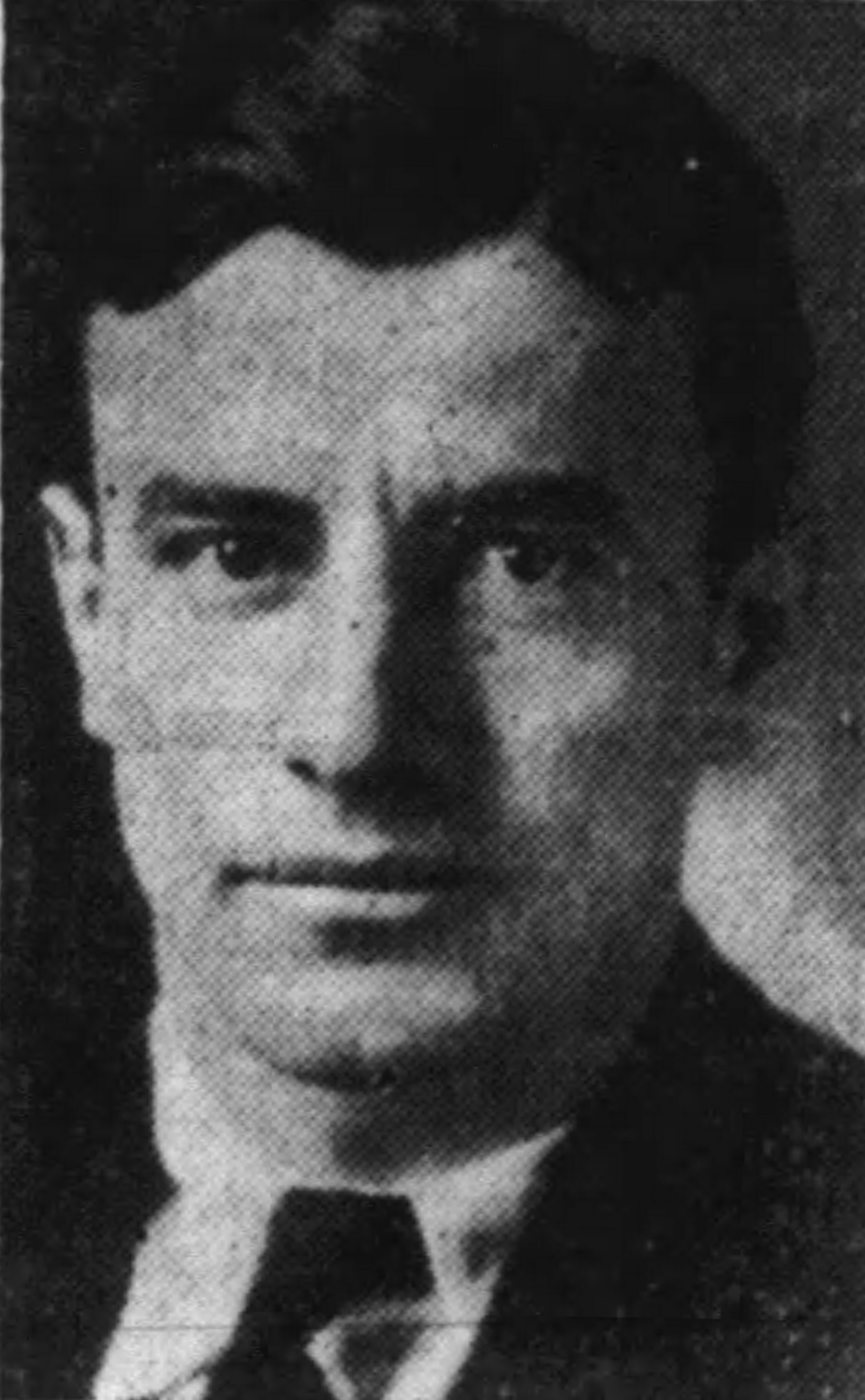
- Brown, c. 1939

Member of the U.S. House of Representatives from Kentucky's at-large district
- In office March 4, 1933 – January 3, 1935
- Preceded by: Constituency established
- Succeeded by: Constituency abolished

Member of the Kentucky House of Representatives
- In office 1966–1968
- Preceded by: John W. Morgan Jr.
- Succeeded by: Robert P. Wooley
- Constituency: 56th district
- In office 1962–1964
- Preceded by: Ted R. Osborne
- Succeeded by: District abolished
- Constituency: 49th district
- In office 1954–1956
- Preceded by: Bart N. Peak
- Succeeded by: John B. Breckinridge
- Constituency: 49th district
- In office 1946–1948
- Preceded by: Charles B. Gentry
- Succeeded by: Chas. J. Bronston
- Constituency: 49th district
- In office 1930–1933
- Preceded by: Jesse O. Creech
- Succeeded by: Robert E. Beatty
- Constituency: 76th district (1930-1932); 75th district (1932-1933)

Personal details
- Born: John Young Brown; February 1, 1900 Union County, Kentucky, U.S.
- Died: June 16, 1985 (aged 85) Louisville, Kentucky, U.S.
- Party: Democratic
- Spouse: Dorothy Inman (m. 1929; div. 1973)
- Children: 5, including John
- Relatives: John Y. Brown III (grandson); Pamela Brown (granddaughter)
- Education: Centre College (BA); University of Kentucky (LLB)

John Young Brown (February 1, 1900 – June 16, 1985) was an American attorney and Democratic Party politician from Kentucky. He served six nonconsecutive, two-year terms in the Kentucky House of Representatives between 1930 and 1968, including one as speaker of the House in 1932 and one as majority floor leader in 1966. He also served one term in the U.S. House of Representatives from 1933 to 1935 and was repeatedly an unsuccessful candidate for United States Senate and governor of Kentucky. He ran seven campaigns for the Senate, losing the general election twice and the Democratic primary five times. His son, John Y. Brown Jr., purchased KFC from Harlan Sanders and was governor of Kentucky from 1979 to 1983.

Brown was born near Geiger Lake in Union County, Kentucky to tenant farmers who named him after former governor John Young Brown. He graduated from Centre College, where he played football, and University of Kentucky College of Law. He practiced law in Lexington from 1926 to 1985. His practice involved representing coal miners. In 1929, he was elected to the Kentucky House of Representatives, and in 1932, he was elected to the United States House of Representatives. However, in 1934, his at-large seat was eliminated, and he lost the Democratic nomination in the newly drawn 6th congressional district to Virgil Chapman. He ran unsuccessfully for United States Senate in 1936, losing to incumbent M. M. Logan, and governor in 1939, losing to Keen Johnson.

Although Brown was elected sporadically to the Kentucky House over the next three decades, he never returned to the United States Congress. He lost the 1942 Democratic primary for Senate to incumbent Happy Chandler by a wide margin. He returned to prominence by winning the 1946 Senate special election primary over Phil Ardery, but he lost the general election to John Sherman Cooper. He lost to Chapman again in the 1948 Senate primary and lost to Johnson again in the 1960 Senate primary; each lost to Cooper in the general election. In 1966, he won the Democratic nomination but lost to Cooper again in a landslide. Finally, he ran for an open seat in the 1968 Democratic primary but lost to Katherine Peden, after which he retired from politics.

== Biography ==
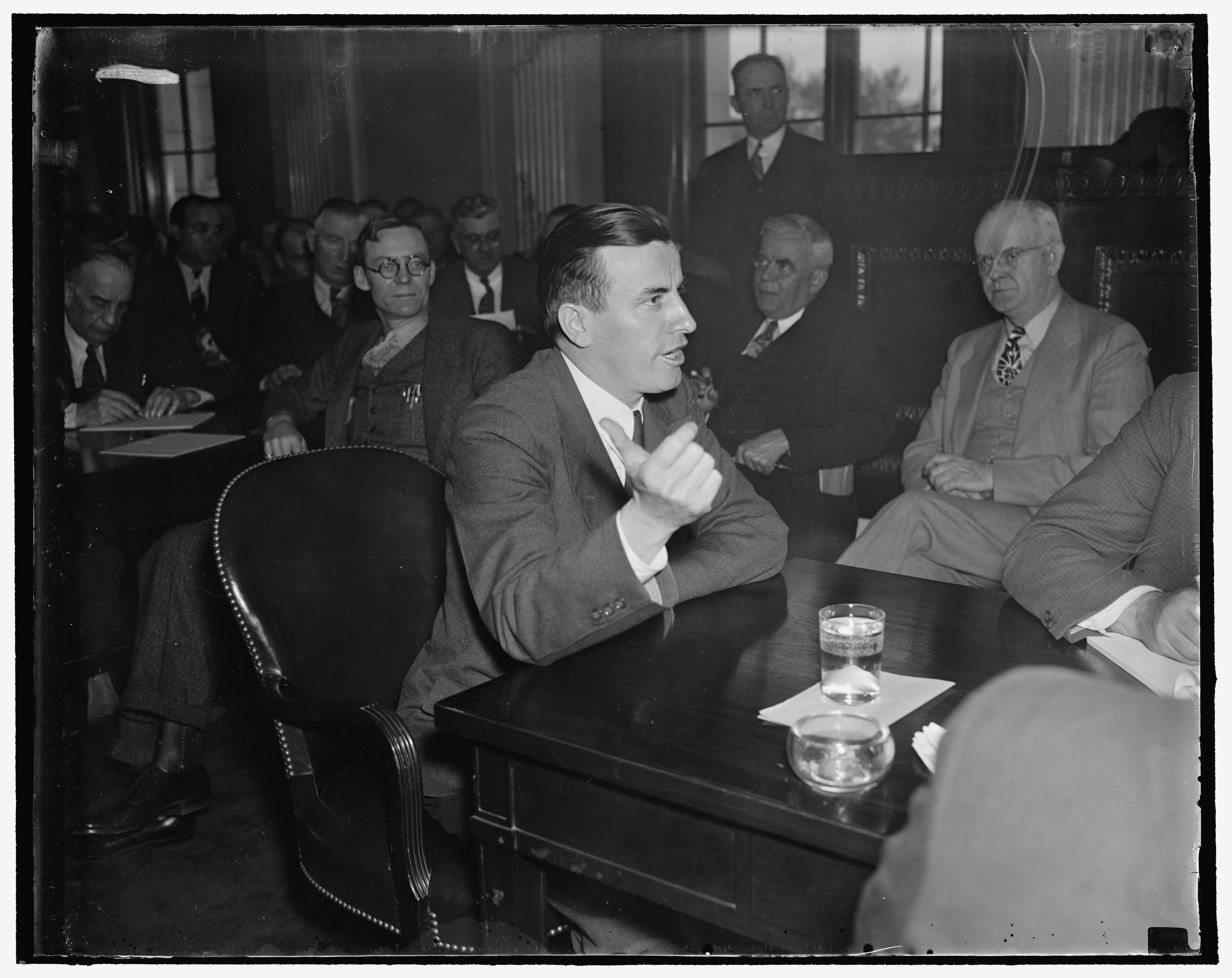
Young testifies before the La Follette Civil Rights Committee in April 1937

Brown was the son of tenant farmers Jesse C. and Lucy Keeper Brown, who named him after John Young Brown, a former governor and neighbor. He was born on a farm near Geiger Lake, Union County, Kentucky, attended Union County schools and graduated from the high school at Sturgis, Kentucky. He graduated from Centre College at Danville, Kentucky with an A.B. degree in 1921 where he was a member of Phi Kappa Tau fraternity and a "Scrub" player on the famous Centre Praying Colonels football team. He received his LL.B. degree from University of Kentucky College of Law in 1926 and was admitted to the bar that same year.

He was a well-known trial lawyer who practiced law from 1926 to 1985 in Lexington, Kentucky, with three firms: Brown and Miller, Brown and Son, and Brown, Sledd and McCann. He was noted for his extensive quotation of the Bible from memory during his summations to juries and his representation of coal miners. Brown was elected to Congress in 1932 when the state failed to redistrict due to a reduction in the number of its House members and elected them at large. It was his only statewide victory. In 1934 he lost the Democratic nomination in the new Sixth District to Virgil Chapman. He lost the 1939 Democratic primary for governor to Lt. Gov. Keen Johnson and the primaries for the U.S. Senate in 1936 and 1942, the last one to Sen. A. B. "Happy" Chandler. He won the Senate nomination in 1946 over Phil Ardery but lost the general election to Republican John Sherman Cooper. He lost the 1948 Senate primary to Chapman, who was elected but died in 1951, and the 1960 primary to Johnson. He won the nomination in 1966 but lost again to Cooper. He finished second to Katherine Peden in the 1968 Democratic primary.

Brown sponsored much legislation in the state House including the state's first sales-tax and civil-rights laws. He was recognized on many occasions as the most effective legislator in the House. He lost to Richard P. "Dick" Moloney in a 1951 primary for the state Senate.

== Personal life ==
Brown married Dorothy Inman in March 1929 in New Albany, Indiana. They had five children: Dorothy Ann, Betty, John Y. Jr., Diana, and Pamela. They divorced in 1973 after repeated political campaigns strained their relationship. Their son, John Y. Brown Jr., made a large fortune as the owner of Kentucky Fried Chicken and was Kentucky governor from 1979 to 1983. Their daughter Pamela died in 1970 in an ill-fated attempt to cross the Atlantic Ocean in a balloon dubbed "The Free Life." He is also the grandfather of former Kentucky Secretary of State John Y. Brown III, news anchor Pamela Brown and philanthropist Lincoln Brown.

Brown died of pneumonia in Louisville, six months after being paralyzed from the waist down in an automobile accident.

== Legacy ==
Brown is a member of the University of Kentucky College of Law's Hall of Fame and the Phi Kappa Tau Hall of Fame.

U.S. House of Representatives
New constituency	Member of the U.S. House of Representatives from Kentucky's at-large congressional district 1933–1935	Constituency abolished
Party political offices
Preceded by Happy Chandler	Democratic nominee for U.S. Senator from Kentucky (Class 2); 1946	Succeeded by Virgil Chapman
Preceded by Keen Johnson	Democratic nominee for U.S. Senator from Kentucky (Class 2); 1966	Succeeded by Walter Dee Huddleston
