= 1946 United States Senate special election in Kentucky =

- November 5, 1946
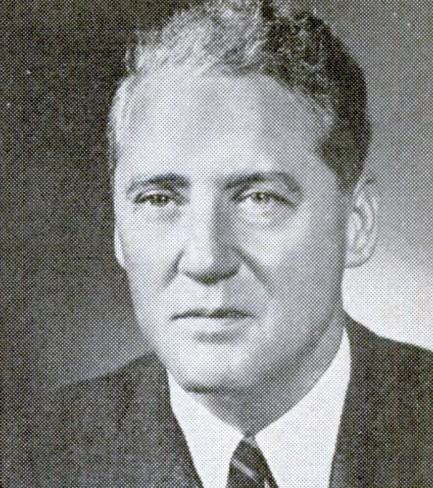

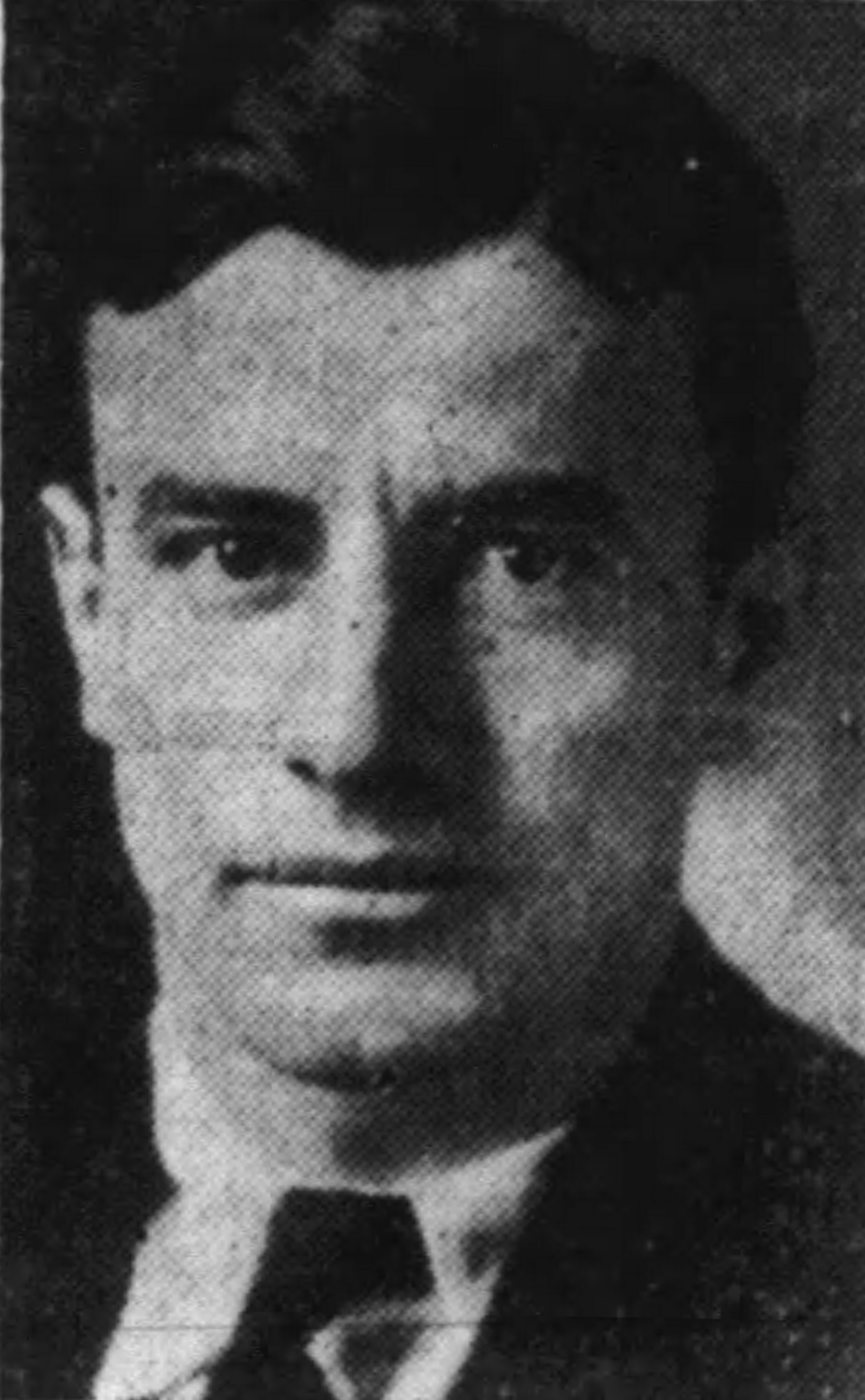
| Nominee | John Sherman Cooper | John Y. Brown |
| Party | Republican | Democratic |
| Popular vote | 327,652 | 285,829 |
| Percentage | 53.27% | 46.47% |
- County results Cooper: 50–60% 60–70% 70–80% 80–90% >90% Brown: 50–60% 60–70% 70–80% 80–90%
U.S. senator before election
William A. Stanfill
Republican
Elected U.S. Senator
John Sherman Cooper
Republican

The 1946 United States Senate special election in Kentucky was held on November 5, 1946, to complete the unexpired term of Senator Happy Chandler, who resigned to become Commissioner of Baseball. Interim Senator William A. Stanfill did not run for the full term. Republican John Sherman Cooper defeated Democratic former U.S. Representative John Y. Brown to complete the term.

This was the first of seven consecutive elections to this seat (three special and four regular) in twenty years for which Cooper was the Republican nominee.

== Background ==
Incumbent Senator Happy Chandler resigned to become Commissioner of Baseball on November 1, 1945. Governor Simeon Willis appointed William A. Stanfill to fill the vacant seat until a successor could be duly elected. The special election was scheduled for November 5, 1946, concurrent with the general election.

== Primary elections ==
=== Republican primary ===
==== Candidates ====
- John Sherman Cooper, circuit judge and former State Representative
- Roscoe Conklin Douglas

==== Results ====
Primary results by county Cooper: 60%–70%; 70%–80%; 80%–90%; 90–100%; Douglas: 60%–70%

Republican primary results
| Party | Candidate | Votes | % |
|---|---|---|---|
| Republican | John Sherman Cooper | 48,092 | 85.85 |
| Republican | Roscoe Conklin Douglas | 7,927 | 14.15 |
| Total votes | | 56,019 | 100.00 |

=== Democratic primary ===
==== Candidates ====
- Philip P. Ardery
- John Y. Brown, former U.S. Congressmember
- James Delk
- Blakey Helm
- Tom Logan
- George T. Smith
- Henry C. Stephens, Jr.
- John J. Thobe
- Norris Brooks Vincent

==== Results ====
Primary results by county Brown: 30%–40%; 40%–50%; 50%–60%; 60%–70%; 70%–80%; 80%–90%; 90–100%; Ardery: 30%–40%; 40%–50%; 50%–60%; 60%–70%; 70%–80%; 80%–90%; Other: 30%–40%; 40%–50%; 50%–60%; 60%–70%; 70%–80%; 80%–90%; 90–100%

Democratic primary results
| Party | Candidate | Votes | % |
|---|---|---|---|
| Democratic | John Y. Brown | 55,297 | 43.64 |
| Democratic | Philip P. Ardery | 42,423 | 33.48 |
| Democratic | Blakey Helm | 9,864 | 7.79 |
| Democratic | Norris Brooks Vincent | 7,253 | 5.72 |
| Democratic | Tom Logan | 4,690 | 3.70 |
| Democratic | George T. Smith | 2,444 | 1.93 |
| Democratic | John J. Thobe | 1,826 | 1.44 |
| Democratic | Henry C. Stephens, Jr. | 1,656 | 1.31 |
| Democratic | James Delk | 1,245 | 0.98 |
| Total votes | | 126,698 | 100.00 |

== General election ==
=== Candidates ===
- John Young Brown, former U.S. Representative at-large (Democratic)
- John Sherman Cooper, circuit judge and former State Representative from Pulaski County (Republican)
- W. E. Sandefur (Socialist)

=== Results ===
1946 U.S. Senate special election in Kentucky
| Party | Candidate | Votes | % | ±% |
|---|---|---|---|---|
| Republican | John Sherman Cooper | 327,652 | 53.27% | |
| Democratic | John Young Brown | 285,829 | 46.47% | |
| Socialist | W. E. Sandefur | 1,638 | 0.27% | |
| Total votes | | 615,119 | 100.00% | |
| Republican hold | | Swing | | |

== See also ==
- 1946 United States Senate elections
