= James Holland (Texas Ranger) =

Serial killer investigator

- Born: Polo, Illinois, United States
- Education: University of Louisville
- Known for: Eliciting 93 confessions from serial killer Samuel Little
- Police career
- Country: Texas Department of Public Safety
- Allegiance: United States
- Department: Texas Rangers

James Holland is a retired Texas Ranger who is credited with eliciting 93 confessions from serial killer Samuel Little. The Los Angeles Times profiled Holland in 2019, calling him a "serial killer whisperer". Ranger Holland was also profiled on 60 Minutes in the 2019 episode "The Ranger and the Serial Killer".

== Biography ==
Holland grew up outside of Chicago in the town of Polo, Illinois, where his family renovated The Peek Home Orphanage to accommodate their seven children. Holland graduated from University of Louisville in 1993. According to the International Homicide Investigators Association, Holland joined the Texas Department of Public Safety in 1995 as a highway patrol trooper. He was named a lieutenant in 1995 and later served as a security detail for then-Texas Governor George W. Bush, and provided security during his campaign for President.

== Career ==
Holland's career is punctuated by high-profile homicide investigations and serial killer discoveries. He is credited with eliciting 93 confessions from Samuel Little, which have been painstakingly matched up to 60 cold cases and counting. The FBI named Little the most prolific serial killer in U.S. history, thanks to Holland's work in the interrogation room.

He is recognized as a subject-matter expert in interview techniques and regularly speaks to investigative agencies across the country.

Holland has also appeared on episodes of 48 Hours "The Murder of Jackie Vandagriff" (2020) and "The Plot to Kill Jamie Faith" (2022). Holland's investigative work and interrogation tactics to solve the murder of Jackie Vandagriff were highlighted by CBS News, who also interviewed detectives with the Grapevine Police Department who praised Holland's role in the case.

James Holland’s aggressive interrogation techniques are the subject of a six-part podcast called “Smoke Screen: Just Say You’re Sorry.” Released in 2023, it examines the confession of Larry Driskill, in which Driskill was led by Holland to saying he committed a murder whilst insisting he had no memory of doing so.
