= Thomas R. Underwood =

American politician

Thomas Rust Underwood
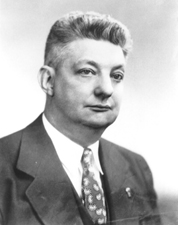

United States Senator from Kentucky
- In office March 19, 1951 – November 4, 1952
- Appointed by: Lawrence Wetherby
- Preceded by: Virgil Chapman
- Succeeded by: John Sherman Cooper

Member of the U.S. House of Representatives from Kentucky's 6th district
- In office January 3, 1949 – March 17, 1951
- Preceded by: Virgil Chapman
- Succeeded by: John C. Watts

Personal details
- Born: March 3, 1898 Hopkinsville, Kentucky, U.S.
- Died: June 29, 1956 (aged 58) Lexington, Kentucky, U.S.
- Resting place: Lexington Cemetery
- Party: Democratic
- Education: University of Kentucky

Thomas Rust Underwood (March 3, 1898 – June 29, 1956) was an American politician who served Kentucky in the United States House of Representatives and in the United States Senate.

== Early life ==
Thomas Rust Underwood was born in Hopkinsville, Kentucky on March 3, 1891. He attended public schools and graduated from the University of Kentucky in 1917. During World War I, Underwood served in the Students Army Training Corps at the University of Kentucky.

== Career ==
Underwood worked as the general manager of the Lexington Herald from 1931 to 1935 and editor from 1935 to 1936. He was a member of the Kentucky state planning board from 1931 to 1935 and secretary of the state racing commission from 1931 to 1943 and 1947 to 1947. He was secretary of the National Association of State Racing Commissioners from 1934 to 1948. He then served as the assistant to the director of the Office of Economic Stabilization in 1943.

Elected as a Democrat to the Eighty-first Congress, Underwood was reelected to the Eighty-second Congress and served from January 3, 1949, until his resignation on March 17, 1951.

Underwood was appointed on March 19, 1951, to the United States Senate as a Democrat to fill the vacancy in the term ending January 3, 1955, caused by the death of Virgil Chapman and served from March 19, 1951, to November 4, 1952. He sought to retain the seat in the 1952 special election but lost to John Sherman Cooper.

After his stint in the Senate, Underwood went back to his editorial duties with the Lexington Herald.

== Death ==
Underwood died in Lexington, Kentucky on June 29, 1956. He was interred at Lexington Cemetery.

Party political offices
Preceded by Virgil Chapman	Democratic nominee for U.S. Senator from Kentucky (Class 2); 1952	Succeeded by Alben W. Barkley
U.S. House of Representatives
Preceded by Virgil Chapman	Member of the U.S. House of Representatives from Kentucky's 6th congressional district 1949–1951	Succeeded by John C. Watts
U.S. Senate
Preceded by Virgil Chapman	United States Senator (Class 2) from Kentucky; March 19, 1951–November 4, 1952; Served alongside: Earle C. Clements	Succeeded by John Sherman Cooper
