= James Phillip Holland =

American educator, student advocate, and researcher born 1934

- Born: 31 December 1934; Bowling Green, Kentucky, USA
- Died: 26 March 1998 (aged 63); Bloomington, Indiana, USA
- Education: Kentucky State College, Indiana University
- Spouse: Constance L.K. Holland (before 1998)
- Scientific career
- Thesis: AN INVESTIGATION OF THE PROTEIN-BOUND IODINE IN THE FOWL (1961)

James Phillip Holland (31 December 1934 – 26 March 1998) was an American endocrinologist and professor. Holland primarily researched animal thyroid endocrinology and reproductive hormones of women, but was best known for his decades of teaching at Indiana University Bloomington and his work in mentoring and advocating for minority students. Holland was also the first Black American from Kentucky to be named to the United States Military Academy, nominated by Senator John Sherman Cooper, though he decided not to attend.

During his 30 years at the Indiana University Bloomington, Holland worked as the associate dean and interim dean of The Indiana University Graduate School, created the Jim Holland Summer Enrichment Program in Biology, worked with Herman C. Hudson to create the Minority Achievers Program and the Mathematics and Science Scholarship Program, and won many awards for his teaching ability.

== Early life ==
James Phillip Holland was born in 1934 in Bowling Green, Kentucky to Charles R. and Rosie (Breman) Holland. He was valedictorian at State Street High School, and was named to the United States Military Academy by Senator John Sherman Cooper on the recommendation of Kentucky State College President R.B. Atwood. Instead of going to West Point, Holland went to Kentucky State College from where he graduated with a Bachelor of Science degree in 1965.

== Work ==
=== Professional education and research ===
Holland earned a Master's degree and Doctoral degree from Indiana University in 1958 and 1961, respectively, in endocrinology for his work on iodine in the thyroid, the determination of plasmid-bound iodine, and the relationship between cellular oxygen consumption and thyroid activity. Holland left Indiana University to work as faculty at Howard University, until he was hired at Indiana University Bloomington in 1967 as an associate professor in the Department of Biology. There Holland continued his research into the thyroid, becoming a full professor in 1974, and continued working as a professor until his death in 1998. His research on thyroid hormones was primarily based on how they influenced female reproductive physiology.

=== Student advocacy ===
Holland worked to increase minority student representation and quality of life during his time at Indiana University. As a part of this he created the Summer Enrichment Program in Biology (now called the Jim Holland Summer Enrichment Program), which was designed to foster interest in the sciences among Indiana's minority high school students. It operates by showing high school students what college science classes and laboratory experiences look like. Holland also worked with Herman C. Hudson to create the Minority Achievers Program and the Mathematics and Science Scholarship Program, which were combined in 2003 and renamed the Hudson and Holland Scholars Program. These programs were designed to help fund exceptional minority students from the United States of America for their undergraduate education.

=== Teaching ===
Holland was granted many awards during his time at Indiana University Bloomington. He was recognized by students and the university administration for his excellence as a teacher and as a mentor, both during his life and posthumously.He was granted the Senior Class Award for Teaching Excellence in Biology and Dedication to Undergraduates seven times, starting in 1972. The Indiana University administration granted him the Distinguished Teaching Award (1974), the Indiana University Distinguished Service Award (1994), the first ever Chancellor's Medallion (1997), the Distinguished Alumni Service Award (1998), and posthumously awarded him the IU Foundation President's Medallion (2003). He was also recognized by student organizations: the Omega Psi Phi fraternity named him Man of the Year (1979) for his work with undergraduates.

== Death and legacy ==
Holland died of cancer on Tuesday, March 26, 1998, at the Bloomington convalescent center. In 2000 the James P. Holland Memorial Lecture was formed. This lecture series is a part of the Hudson and Holland Scholars Program (renamed to honor Hudson and Holland in 2003), and is intended to support education and life sciences research for underrepresented groups as well as to foster interest in the life sciences in high schoolers who are brought to the lecture series.
