= 1948 United States Senate election in Kentucky =

- November 2, 1948
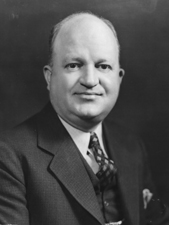

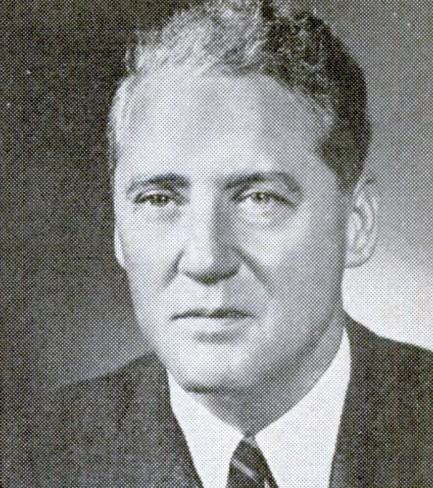
Nominee	Virgil Chapman	John Sherman Cooper
Party	Democratic	Republican
Popular vote	408,256	383,776
Percentage	51.39%	48.31%
- County results Chapman: 50–60% 60–70% 70–80% 80–90% Cooper: 40–50% 50–60% 60–70% 70–80% 80–90%
U.S. senator before election
John Sherman Cooper
Republican
Elected U.S. Senator
Virgil Chapman
Democratic

The 1948 United States Senate election in Kentucky took place on November 2, 1948. Incumbent Republican Senator John Sherman Cooper, who won a 1946 special election to fill the vacant seat of Commissioner of Baseball Happy Chandler, ran for a full term in office but was defeated by Democratic U.S. Representative Virgil Chapman.

== Democratic primary ==
=== Candidates ===
- Virgil Chapman, incumbent U.S. Representative
- John Y. Brown, Sr., member of the Kentucky House of Representatives
- D. E. McQueary
- Milton Whiteworth

=== Results ===
Primary results by county Chapman: 40%–50%; 50%–60%; 60%–70%; 70%–80%; 80%–90%; 90%–100%; Brown: 40%–50%; 50%–60%; 60%–70%; 70%–80%; 80%–90%; Other: 60%–70%

Democratic primary results
Party	Candidate	Votes	%
Democratic	Virgil Chapman	102,860	50.06
Democratic	John Y. Brown, Sr.	90,740	44.16
Democratic	Milton Whiteworth	10,852	5.28
Democratic	D. E. McQueary	1,010	0.49
Total votes		205,462	100.00

== General election ==
=== Candidates ===
- Virgil Chapman, U.S. Representative from Lexington (Democratic)
- John Sherman Cooper, incumbent Senator since 1946 (Republican)
- David R. Cox (Socialist Labor)
- W. A. Standefur (Socialist)
- H. G. Stanfield (Progressive)

=== Results ===
1948 U.S. Senate election in Kentucky
Party	Candidate	Votes	%	±%
Democratic	Virgil Chapman	408,256	51.39%	
Republican	John Sherman Cooper (incumbent)	383,776	48.31%	
Socialist	W. A. Standefur	1,232	0.16%	
Progressive	H. G. Stanfield	924	0.12%	
Socialist Labor	David R. Cox	254	0.03%	
Democratic	John Y. Brown (write-in)	26	0.00%	
Independent	O. G. Gaines (write-in)	1	0.00%	
Total votes		794,469	100.00%	
Democratic gain from Republican		Swing		

== See also ==
- 1948 United States Senate elections
