= Murder of Jackie Vandagriff =

Murder case of Jackie vandagriff

- Date: September 13, 2016
- Location: Grapevine, Texas, United States
- Motive: Sexual
- Deaths: 1 (Jackie Vandagriff)
- Arrests: Charles Dean Bryant
- Verdict: Guilty
- Convictions: murder with a deadly weapon and tampering with physical evidence
- Sentence: Life imprisonment

The murder of Jackie Vandagriff occurred on the night of September 13, 2016, in Grapevine, Texas. Jackie Vandagriff, a 24-year-old student from Texas Woman's University, was brutally killed by Charles Dean Bryant, a 30-year-old fitness trainer.

This case drew widespread attention due to the shocking nature of the crime and the subsequent trial.

== Background ==
Jackie Vandagriff born Jaqueline Rae was a nutrition student at Texas Woman's University in Denton, Texas. She had previously attended the University of North Texas before transferring, and was pursuing a career as a nutritionist. Her class mates described her as vibrant, friendly, and full of enthusiasm.

Charles Dean Bryant, the perpetrator, was a personal trainer and former employee at a fitness center. Before meeting Vandagriff, Bryant had already developed a troubling pattern of behavior in his relationships. He had recently been issued a restraining order by an ex-girlfriend Caitlin Mathis, accusing him of stalking and harassment.

== Crime ==
Vandagriff met Bryant on the evening of September 13, 2016, at a bar in Denton, Texas. According to surveillance footage and witness accounts, the two left the bar together. They eventually ended up at Bryant’s home in Grapevine, Texas.

The following day, authorities found Vandagriff’s body in a park in Grapevine. Her body had been dismembered and set on fire in an attempt to conceal the crime. The police were alerted by firefighters who had responded to a small fire in the park and found her remains.

Investigators quickly connected Bryant to the murder through surveillance footage showing the two together, as well as physical evidence, including GPS data and DNA found on Vandagriff’s remains. Bryant was arrested shortly after the discovery of Vandagriff’s body.

== Investigation and trial ==
During the investigation, it was revealed that Bryant had a history of disturbing behavior, particularly toward women. His ex-girlfriend had filed a restraining order against him, claiming he had stalked and threatened her after their relationship ended. Despite these warnings, Bryant was free at the time of the crime.

In the opening statements of the trial, defense attorney Glynis McGinty asserted that while Bryant was guilty of tampering with evidence, he was not responsible for the murder. Rather, she claimed Bryant panicked after Vandagriff’s death and attempted to conceal her body. Prosecutors presented evidence that Bryant had lured Vandagriff back to his home, where he strangled her to death before dismembering her body and attempting to burn the remains. The defense did not deny Bryant's responsibility in Vandagriff's death; however, they argued she had died during sex, and that her killing had been the result of an impulse.

The jury convicted Bryant of murder, and in 2018, he was sentenced to life in prison without the possibility of parole.
