= William A. Stanfill =

American politician and lawyer (1892–1971)

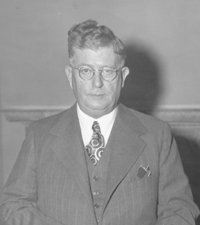

United States Senator from Kentucky
- In office November 19, 1945 – November 5, 1946
- Appointed by: Simeon Willis
- Preceded by: Happy Chandler
- Succeeded by: John Sherman Cooper

Personal details
- Born: William Abner Stanfill; January 16, 1892 Barbourville, Kentucky, US
- Died: June 12, 1971 (aged 79) Lexington, Kentucky, US
- Party: Republican
- Occupation: Politician, lawyer

William Abner Stanfill (January 16, 1892 – June 12, 1971) was an American politician and lawyer. A Republican, he was a member of the United States Senate from Kentucky from 1945 to 1946.

== Early life and education ==
Stanfill was born on January 16, 1892, in Barbourville, Kentucky, the son of Joshua Frances Stanfill and Lura Davis (née Faulkner) Stanfill. Educated at public schools, he studied at Union Commonwealth University and the University of Kentucky Rosenberg College of Law, graduating from the latter in 1912, with a Bachelor of Laws.

== Career ==
Also in 1912, Stanfill was admitted to the bar, after which he began practicing in Barbourville. In 1916, he moved to Hazard, where he continued practicing, being a member of the partnership Faulkner, Stanfill, & Faulkner until 1925. From then until 1950, he was a member of Craft & Stanfill.

From 1927 to 1931, Stanfill was a member of the Morehead State University board of regents, and from 1933 to 1936, was a member of the board of governors of the Kentucky Children's Home, in Lyndon. He was a trustee of Kentucky Wesleyan College.

Stanfill was a Republican. From 1944 to 1948, he was a member of the Kentucky Republican Central Committee, and in 1945, he was chairman of the Republican Party of Kentucky. The administration he was part of claimed to have saved $3,557,321.51, in the salaries of unneeded government employees, between 1943 and 1944.

Following the resignation of Happy Chandler from the United States Senate, Stanfill was appointed by Governor Simeon Willis to complete his unexpired term. He served from November 19, 1945, to November 5, 1946. He was not nominated for the following election.

== Personal life and death ==
After serving in Congress, Stanfill returned to practicing law. He retired to Lexington. On July 17, 1917, he married May Begley, though the William T. Young Library claims they married in 1915. He was Methodist, as well as a member of the Freemasons and the Shriners. He died on June 12, 1971, aged 79, in Lexington. He was buried on June 14, at Hillcrest Memorial Park, in Lexington.

U.S. Senate
Preceded by Happy Chandler	United States Senator (Class 2) from Kentucky; November 19, 1945 – November 5, 1946	Succeeded by John Sherman Cooper
