= John Tuska =

American artist and educator

John Regis Tuska (1931 Yukon, Pennsylvania –1998) was an American artist and educator who was a professor at the University of Kentucky. He was best known as a sculptor and potter, but also as a draftsman, painter, designer and photographer.

== Early life and education ==
Born in Yukon, Pennsylvania, Tuska was the eighth of ten children and the only son of a Slovak immigrant coal miner . When Tuska was age six, his family moved to New York City . Tuska graduated from an alternative high school for the arts and worked proofreading Collier's Encyclopedia for 25 cents a day. He took many visits to the Brooklyn Public Library.

Tuska was educated at the New York State College of Ceramics at Alfred University. After graduating he moved to Kentucky for a teaching job at the Murray State University. After three years, Tuska moved to University of Kentucky, where he lectured for over 30 years.

Tuska continued to create and teach until his death in 1998.

== Creative work ==
Tuska's body of work can be found in collections and public spaces, both regionally and internationally. He created thousands of pieces of art including drawing, collage, ceramics and papier-mache. His last major work was Illumine, a "series of 56 bronze figures celebrating individual human expression that are mounted on the façade of UK's Fine Arts Building". He was working on it for 10 years - from 1985 to 1995. Other works include Study of 4 Squares mixed media on paper.

== Legacy ==
After Tuska's death, his son Seth created Tuska Studio to produce works' process and to show Tuska projects' technique.

== Personal life ==
Tuska met his wife Miriam at Alfred: the couple had two sons Seth and Stephen. In 1975 the family bought a Victorian house at Old Park Avenue in Lexington, this house is now the Tuska Museum and Gallery.
