= James P. Holland =

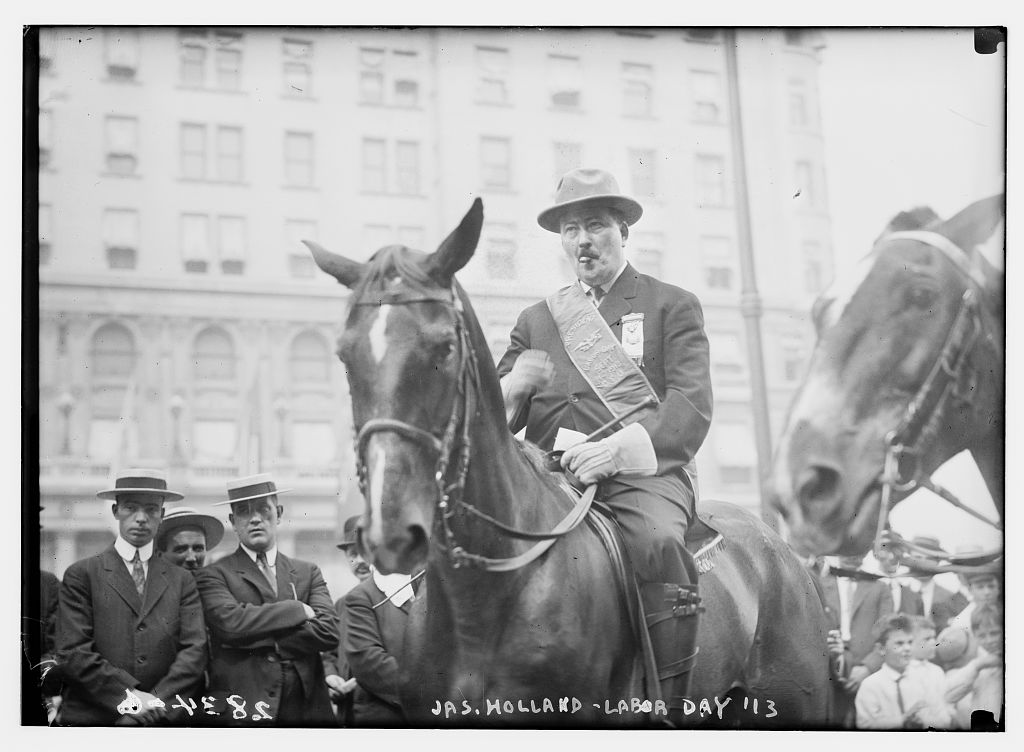
Holland at Labor Day Parade September 11, 1913

James P. Holland (1865 - November 9, 1941) was president of the New York State Federation of Labor from 1916 to 1926.

== Biography ==
He was a member of the Eccentric Firemen's Union of New York City. In 1913 he was the grand marshal of the New York City Labor Day Parade. As president of the New York State Federation of Labor he succeeded Homer Call of the International Butcher Workmen's Union of Syracuse, New York. Holland remained president from 1916 to 1926. He was succeeded by John Sullivan of the Brewery, Cereal and Soft Drink Workers' Union of New York City. He died on November 9, 1941, in New York City.

Political offices
Preceded by Homer Call	President of the New York State Federation of Labor; 1916-1926	Succeeded by John Sullivan (union)
