= Robert Humphreys (politician) =

American politician (1893–1977)

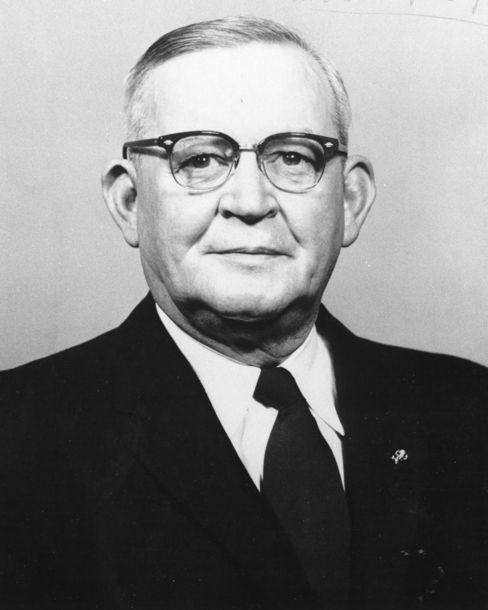

United States Senator from Kentucky
- In office June 21, 1956 – November 6, 1956
- Appointed by: Happy Chandler
- Preceded by: Alben W. Barkley
- Succeeded by: John S. Cooper

Member of the Kentucky Senate from the 1st district
- In office January 5, 1932 – January 7, 1936
- Preceded by: O. Houston Brooks
- Succeeded by: J. W. McDonald

Member of the Kentucky House of Representatives from the 3rd district
- In office January 6, 1920 – January 3, 1922
- Preceded by: Leslie P. Jones
- Succeeded by: Beryl Boyd

Personal details
- Born: August 20, 1893 Hickman County, Kentucky, U.S.
- Died: December 31, 1977 (aged 84) Frankfort, Kentucky, U.S.
- Resting place: Highland Park Cemetery, Mayfield, Kentucky
- Party: Democratic
- Spouse: Imogene Covington

Military service
- Allegiance: United States
- Branch/service: United States Army
- Years of service: 1917–1919; 1943–1945
- Rank: Captain
- Battles/wars: World War I World War II

Robert Humphreys (August 20, 1893 – December 31, 1977) was an American politician. He was briefly a member of the United States Senate from Kentucky.

After service in World War I, Humphreys worked as a registered pharmacist in the retail drug business in Mayfield, Kentucky and later at Frankfort, Kentucky. He served in the Kentucky House of Representatives in 1920 and in the Kentucky Senate 1932–1936. He served as President Pro Tempore of the Kentucky Senate in 1934 and as clerk of three senate sessions 1936–1942. He served as Kentucky highway commissioner 1936–1940. During World War II he served as a captain in the Medical Corps, 1943–1945. He again served as state highway commissioner 1955–1956. Then he resigned to accept appointment to the United States Senate on June 21, 1956, as a Democrat to fill the vacancy caused by the death of Alben Barkley. He served in the Senate from June 21, 1956, to November 6, 1956. Humphreys did not seek election to the Senate, opting instead to serve only for the brief time he was appointed.

== Sources ==
- United States Congress. "Robert Humphreys (id: H000963)". Biographical Directory of the United States Congress.

U.S. Senate
Preceded by Alben W. Barkley	U.S. senator (Class 2) from Kentucky; June 21, 1956 – November 6, 1956; Served alongside: Earle C. Clements	Succeeded by John Sherman Cooper
