= Virgil Chapman =

American politician (1895–1951)

Virgil Munday Chapman
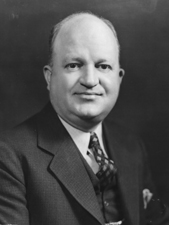

United States Senator from Kentucky
- In office January 3, 1949 – March 8, 1951
- Preceded by: John S. Cooper
- Succeeded by: Thomas R. Underwood

Member of the U.S. House of Representatives from Kentucky
- In office March 4, 1931 – January 3, 1949
- Preceded by: Robert E. Lee Blackburn
- Succeeded by: Thomas R. Underwood
- Constituency: 7th district (1931–1933); At-large district (1933–1935); 6th district (1935–1949)
- In office March 4, 1925 – March 3, 1929
- Preceded by: Joseph W. Morris
- Succeeded by: Robert E. Lee Blackburn
- Constituency: 7th district

Personal details
- Born: March 15, 1895 Middleton, Kentucky, US
- Died: March 8, 1951 (aged 55) Bethesda, Maryland, US
- Party: Democratic

Virgil Munday Chapman (March 15, 1895 – March 8, 1951) was an American attorney and Democratic politician who represented Kentucky in the United States House of Representatives and in the United States Senate.

Chapman was born in Middleton, Kentucky, in Simpson County, near the Logan County line. He practiced law in Irvine, Kentucky, then Paris, Kentucky and Lexington, Kentucky. He was married to Mary Chapman and had one daughter, Elizabeth.

In 1924 Chapman was elected to the United States House of Representatives and served two terms representing Kentucky's 7th District. He lost his seat to Republican Robert E. Lee Blackburn in the 1928 Republican landslide as Herbert Hoover was elected president, then defeated Blackburn in 1930. He was re-elected in 1932, when Kentucky members were elected statewide at large due to loss of a seat and lack of redistricting, then was elected in the 6th District in 1934. He served through 1948, when he defeated incumbent Republican U.S. Sen. John Sherman Cooper. He died in an automobile accident in Bethesda, Maryland on March 8, 1951.

Chapman was succeeded in the House and the Senate by Thomas R. Underwood, who had been editor of the Lexington Herald and managed the 1947 campaign of Gov. Earle C. Clements.

== See also ==
- List of members of the United States Congress who died in office (1950–1999)

Party political offices
Preceded by John Y. Brown Sr.	Democratic nominee for U.S. Senator from Kentucky (Class 2); 1948	Succeeded by Thomas R. Underwood
U.S. House of Representatives
Preceded by Joseph W. Morris	Member of the U.S. House of Representatives from Kentucky's 7th congressional district 1925 – 1929	Succeeded by Robert E. Lee Blackburn
Preceded by Robert E. Lee Blackburn	Member of the U.S. House of Representatives from Kentucky's 7th congressional district 1931 – 1935	Succeeded by Andrew J. May
Preceded by Brent Spence	Member of the U.S. House of Representatives from Kentucky's 6th congressional district 1935 – 1949	Succeeded by Thomas R. Underwood
U.S. Senate
Preceded by John Sherman Cooper	U.S. senator (Class 2) from Kentucky; January 3, 1949 – March 8, 1951; Served alongside: Alben W. Barkley, Garrett L. Withers, Earle C. Clements	Succeeded by Thomas R. Underwood
