= 1930 United States Senate elections in Kentucky =

1930 United States Senate election in Kentucky
- November 4, 1930
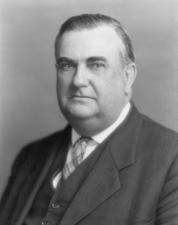

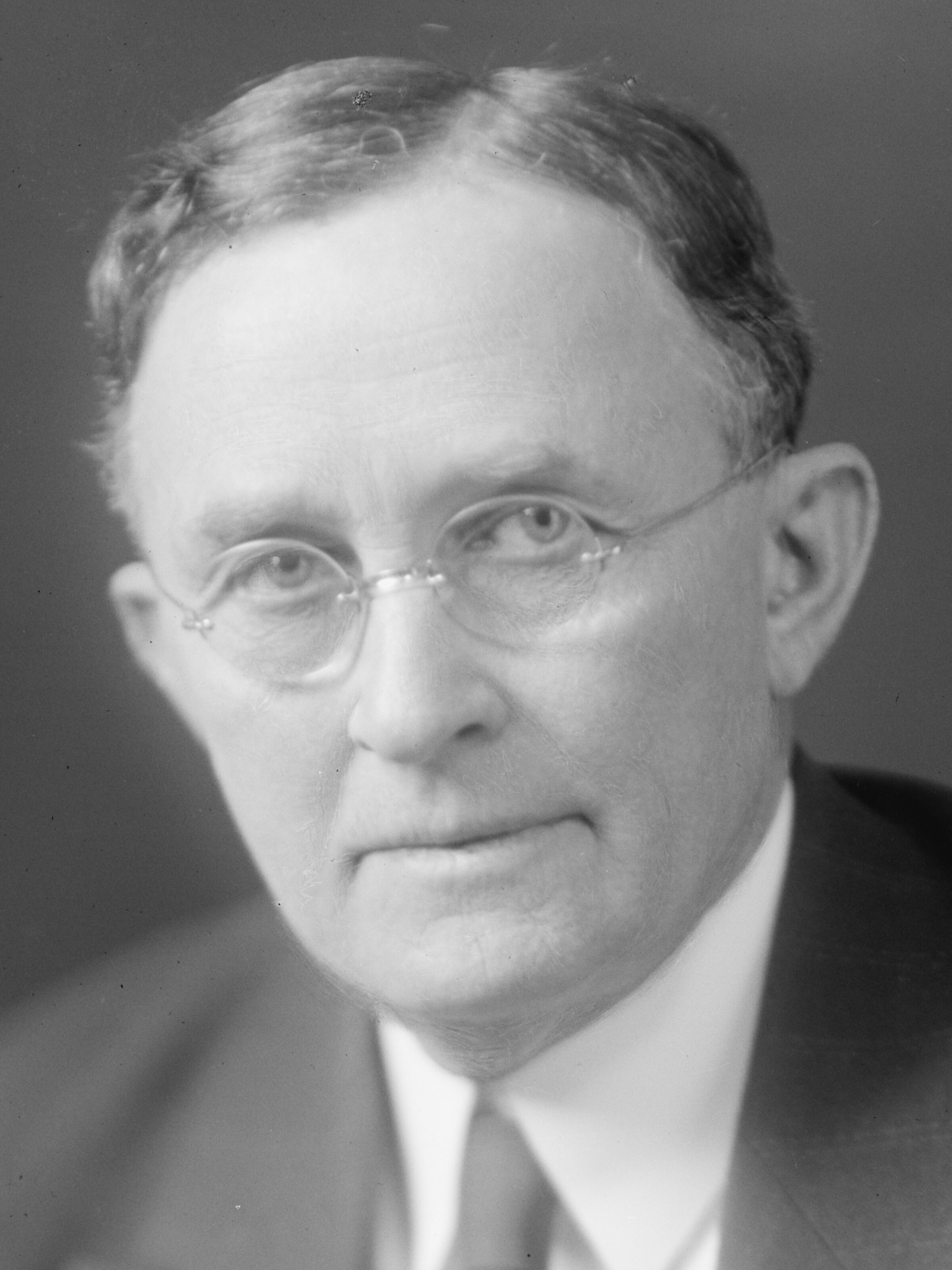
Nominee	M. M. Logan	John M. Robsion
Party	Democratic	Republican
Popular vote	336,718	309,180
Percentage	52.13%	47.87%
- County results Logan: 50–60% 60–70% 70–80% 80–90% Robsion: 50–60% 60–70% 70–80% 80–90%
U.S. senator before election
John M. Robsion
Republican
Elected U.S. Senator
Ben M. Williamson
(for unexpired term)
M. M. Logan (for next term)
Democratic

The 1930 United States Senate election in Kentucky took place on November 4, 1930, alongside a special election to the same seat.

Incumbent Senator Frederic M. Sackett resigned on January 9, 1930, to become Ambassador to Germany. Governor Flem D. Sampson appointed U.S. Representative John M. Robsion to fill Sackett's seat until a successor could be duly elected. Robsion lost both the special election to complete the term and the regularly scheduled 1930 election, both held on November 4.

== General election ==
=== Regular election ===
==== Candidates ====
- M. M. Logan, Judge of the Kentucky Court of Appeals (then the state's highest court) and former Kentucky Attorney General (Democratic)
- John M. Robsion, interim Senator and former U.S. Representative from Barbourville (Republican)

==== Results ====
1930 U.S. Senate election in Kentucky
Party	Candidate	Votes	%	±%
Democratic	M. M. Logan	336,718	52.13%	
Republican	John M. Robsion (incumbent)	309,180	47.87%	
Turnout		645,898	100.00%	
Democratic gain from Republican				

=== Special election ===
==== Candidates ====
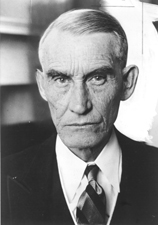
Ben M. Williamson was elected to complete the remaining four months of Senator Sackett's term.

- Ben M. Williamson, president of the Kentucky Crippled Children's Commission (Democratic)
- John M. Robsion, interim Senator and former U.S. Representative from Barbourville (Republican)

==== Results ====
1930 U.S. Senate special election in Kentucky
Party	Candidate	Votes	%	±%
Democratic	Ben M. Williamson	326,723	52.34%	
Republican	John M. Robsion (incumbent)	297,510	47.66%	
Total votes		624,233	100.00%	
Democratic gain from Republican				

== See also ==
- 1930 United States Senate elections
