= Ben M. Williamson =

United States politician and businessman

Ben Mitchell Williamson
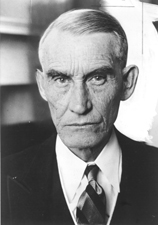

United States Senator from Kentucky
- In office December 1, 1930 – March 4, 1931
- Preceded by: John M. Robsion
- Succeeded by: Marvel M. Logan

Personal details
- Born: October 16, 1864 Pike County, Kentucky
- Died: June 23, 1941 (aged 76) Cincinnati, Ohio, US
- Party: Democratic

Ben Mitchell Williamson (October 16, 1864 – June 23, 1941) was a Democratic U.S. senator from Kentucky.

Born in Pike County, Kentucky, Williamson attended the rural schools of Kentucky and Bethany College in West Virginia. He engaged in the wholesale hardware business at Catlettsburg, Kentucky, from 1886 to 1924, and then in nearby Ashland, Kentucky, in 1924. He also engaged in banking and in coal mining. He was one of the founders of the Kentucky Crippled Children's Commission, serving as president from 1924 to 1941. He was also a member of the board of charities and correction for the State of Kentucky from 1929 to 1930, and the director of the International Society for Crippled Children.

Williamson was elected as a Democrat to the United States Senate on November 4, 1930, to fill the vacancy caused by the resignation of Frederic M. Sackett and his initial replacement by John M. Robsion. He served only from December 1, 1930, to March 3, 1931, and was not a candidate for election to a full term.

Afterwards Williamson resumed the wholesale hardware business in Ashland, with residence in Catlettsburg, and was interested financially in various other business enterprises. He died in Cincinnati, Ohio, and was interred in the Ashland Cemetery Mausoleum in Ashland, Kentucky.

== Sources ==
- United States Congress. "Ben M. Williamson (id: W000550)". Biographical Directory of the United States Congress.

Party political offices
Preceded by Augustus Owsley Stanley	Democratic nominee for U.S. Senator from Kentucky (Class 2); 1930	Succeeded by Marvel M. Logan
U.S. Senate
Preceded by John M. Robsion	U.S. senator (Class 2) from Kentucky; December 1, 1930 – March 4, 1931; Served alongside: Alben W. Barkley	Succeeded by Marvel M. Logan
