= M. M. Logan =

American politician

Marvel Mills Logan
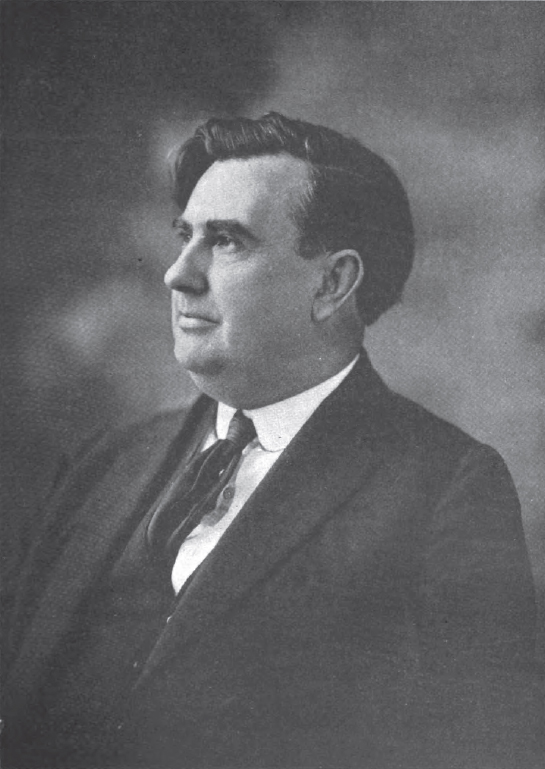
- Logan, c. 1922

United States Senator from Kentucky
- In office March 4, 1931 – October 3, 1939
- Preceded by: Ben M. Williamson
- Succeeded by: Happy Chandler

Chief Justice of the Kentucky Court of Appeals
- In office January 12, 1931 – March 31, 1931 (Note: Despite his senate term beginning on March 4, Logan remained on the bench until the close of the court's term on March 31)
- Preceded by: Gus Thomas
- Succeeded by: Gus Thomas

Justice of the Kentucky Court of Appeals
- In office January 4, 1927 – March 31, 1931
- Preceded by: W. E. Settle
- Succeeded by: Andrew Jackson Bratcher

25th Attorney General of Kentucky
- In office 1916–1917
- Governor: Augustus O. Stanley
- Preceded by: James Garnett
- Succeeded by: Charles H. Morris

Personal details
- Born: January 7, 1874 Brownsville, Kentucky, US
- Died: October 3, 1939 (aged 65) Washington, D.C., US
- Party: Democratic
- Spouse: Della Haydon Logan (1873-1951) m. 1896
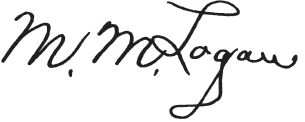
- Signature

Marvel Mills Logan (January 7, 1874 – October 3, 1939) was an American politician and attorney who served as a member of the United States Senate from Kentucky from his election in 1931 until his death in 1939. He previously served as chief justice of the Kentucky Court of Appeals, and attorney general of Kentucky.

== Early life and education ==
Logan was born on a farm near Brownsville, Kentucky. He taught school for two years and also conducted a training school for teachers. He then studied law and was admitted to the bar in 1896.

== Career ==
He practiced law in Brownsville. He served as chairman of the board of trustees of Brownsville; as county attorney of Edmonson County 1902–1903; as assistant Attorney General of Kentucky 1912–1915; as Attorney General of Kentucky 1915–1917; and as chairman of the Kentucky Tax Commission 1917–1918.

He then moved to Louisville, Kentucky, in 1918 and then to Bowling Green, Kentucky, in 1922, continuing to practice law. He served as a member of the State Board of Education, the State Board of Sinking Fund Commissioners, and the State Board of Printing Commissioners. He served as a justice of the Kentucky Court of Appeals 1926–1930 and as Chief Justice in 1931.

Logan was elected as a Democrat to the United States Senate in 1930, defeating Republican John M. Robsion, who had been appointed to fill the seat of Frederic M. Sackett, who had become ambassador to Germany. (Democrat Ben M. Williamson defeated Robsion for the rest of the unexpired term, which ended March 3, 1931.) He was re-elected in 1936, narrowly defeating former governor and senator J.C.W. Beckham in the primary election. He served in the Senate from March 4, 1931, until his death. While in the Senate he served as chairman of the Committee on Mines and Mining (Seventy-third through Seventy-fifth Congresses) and on the Committee on Claims (Seventy-sixth Congress).

In 1933 Logan chaired the subcommittee dispatched to Louisiana by the United States Senate to investigate allegations of corrupt activities of the political machine of Huey Long during the 1932 election of John H. Overton to the Senate. Logan's inquiry reported that the election was impacted by fraud, specifically the involvement of dummy candidates and deducts (money taken from public employees' pay for use by the Long machine), but no action was taken against Overton.

== Personal life ==
In 1896, Logan married Della Haydon Logan (1873–1951) and they had four children.

In 1929, Logan was elected Grand Sire (now Sovereign Grand Master) of the Independent Order of Odd Fellows, governing the fraternity at an international level.

Logan died in Washington, D.C., on October 3, 1939, and is buried in the Fairview Cemetery in Brownsville.

== See also ==
- List of members of the United States Congress who died in office (1900–1949)

Party political offices
Preceded by Ben M. Williamson	Democratic nominee for U.S. Senator from Kentucky (Class 2); 1930, 1936	Succeeded by Happy Chandler
U.S. Senate
Preceded by Ben M. Williamson	United States Senator (Class 2) from Kentucky; March 4, 1931–October 3, 1939	Succeeded by Happy Chandler
Legal offices
Preceded by James Garnett	Attorney General of Kentucky; 1916–1917	Succeeded by Charles H. Morris
