= 1940 United States Senate special election in Kentucky =

- November 5, 1940
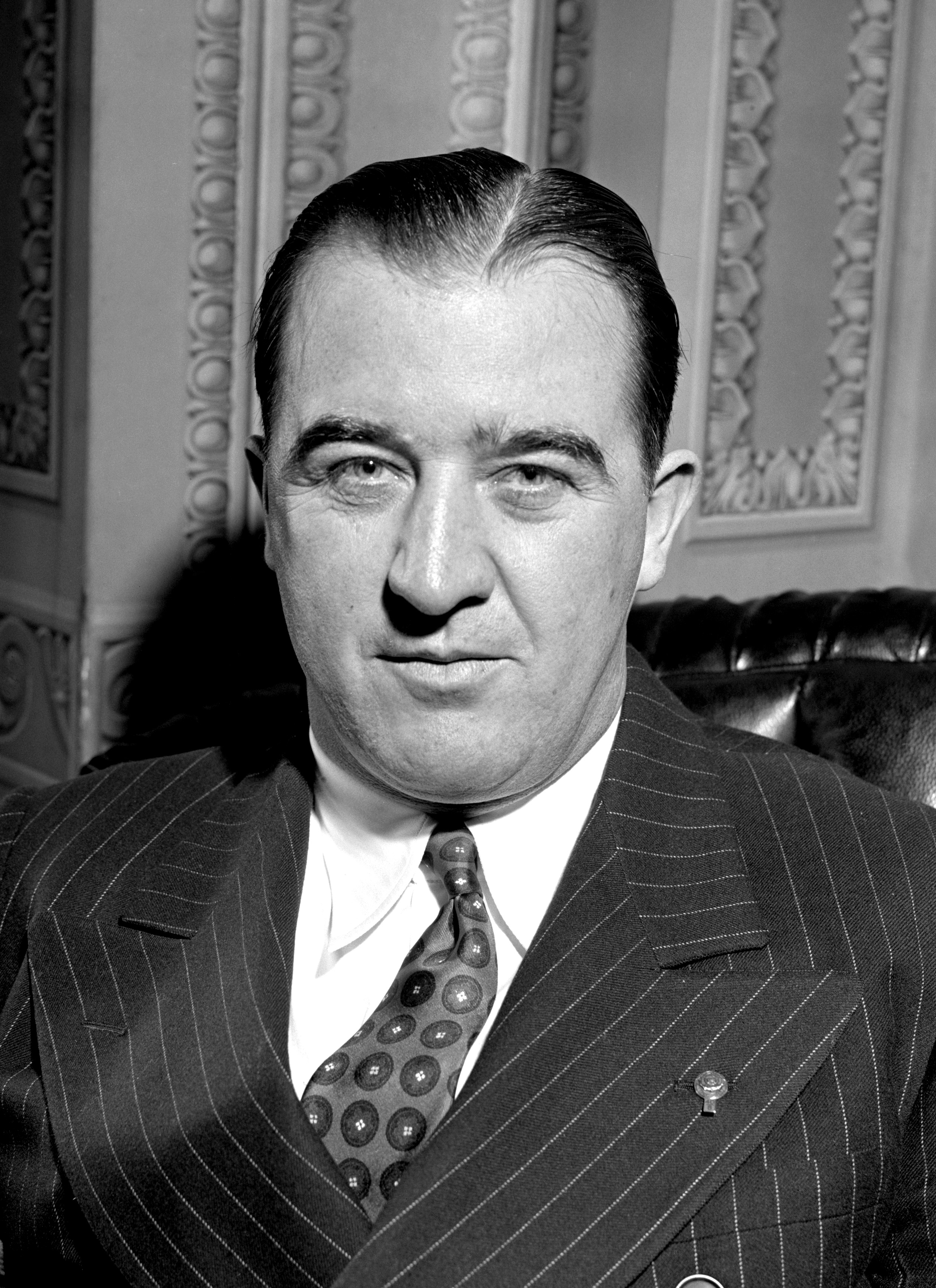

Nominee	Happy Chandler	Walter B. Smith
Party	Democratic	Republican
Popular vote	561,151	401,812
Percentage	58.27%	41.73%
- County results Chandler: 50–60% 60–70% 70–80% 80–90% Smith: 50–60% 60–70% 70–80% 80–90%
U.S. senator before election
Happy Chandler
Democratic
Elected U.S. Senator
Happy Chandler
Democratic

The 1940 United States Senate special election in Kentucky took place on November 5, 1940, to complete the unexpired term of M. M. Logan. Interim appointee Happy Chandler was re-elected to complete the term, defeating Republican Walter B. Smith.

== Background ==
Senator M. M. Logan died on October 3, 1939. Governor of Kentucky Happy Chandler, whose term was set to expire in 1940, resigned his office so that Lieutenant Governor (and Democratic nominee for Governor) Keen Johnson could appoint him to the Senate. Johnson appointed Chandler to fill the vacant seat until a successor could be duly elected, and the special election was scheduled for November 5, 1940, concurrent with the general election.

== Primary election ==
=== Candidates ===
- Happy Chandler, incumbent U.S. Senator
- Charles R. Farnsley, member of the Kentucky House of Representatives
- M. E. Gilbert
- Jack Harrod
- John J. Thobe
- Joseph G. Thornbury

=== Results ===
Primary results by county Chandler: 50%–60%; 60%–70%; 70%–80%; 80%–90%; 90%–100%; Farnsley: 80%–90%

Democratic primary results
Party	Candidate	Votes	%
Democratic	Happy Chandler (incumbent)	176,520	79.19
Democratic	Charles R. Farnsley	26,061	11.69
Democratic	M. E. Gilbert	7,788	3.49
Democratic	Joseph G. Thornbury	4,909	2.20
Democratic	Jack Harrod	4,189	1.88
Democratic	John J. Thobe	3,439	1.54
Total votes		222,906	100.00

== General election ==
=== Candidates ===
- Happy Chandler, Governor of Kentucky and candidate for Senate in 1938 (Democratic)
- Walter B. Smith (Republican)

=== Results ===
1940 U.S. Senate election in Kentucky
Party	Candidate	Votes	%	±%
Democratic	Happy Chandler (Incumbent)	561,151	58.27%	
Republican	Walter B. Smith	401,812	41.73%	
Total votes		962,963	100.00%	
Democratic hold		Swing		

== See also ==
- 1940 United States Senate elections
