= Gus Thomas =

American judge

- Thomas, c. 1916

Chief Justice of the Kentucky Court of Appeals
- In office January 2, 1939 – April 10, 1939
- Preceded by: James W. Stites
- Succeeded by: Alex L. Ratliff
- In office March 31, 1931 – September 21, 1931
- Preceded by: M. M. Logan
- Succeeded by: Richard Priest Dietzman
- In office November 1, 1929 – January 12, 1931
- Preceded by: D. A. McCandless
- Succeeded by: M. M. Logan
- In office April 12, 1926 – January 4, 1927
- Preceded by: Ernest S. Clarke
- Succeeded by: William Rogers Clay

Justice of the Kentucky Court of Appeals
- In office December 1, 1915 – January 2, 1951
- Preceded by: Clement Singleton Nunn
- Succeeded by: Brady M. Stewart

Personal details
- Born: William Augustus Thomas; December 14, 1863 Fulton, Kentucky
- Died: June 3, 1951 (aged 87) Frankfort, Kentucky
- Resting place: Frankfort Cemetery; Frankfort, Kentucky
- Party: Democratic
- Education: Northern Indiana Law School

William Augustus Thomas (December 14, 1863 – June 3, 1951) was an American lawyer and jurist who served as a justice of the Kentucky Court of Appeals from 1915 to 1951. He served as chief justice of the court from 1926 to 1927, 1929 to January 1931, March to September 1931, and January to April 1939.

He holds the record for the longest tenure of any member of Kentucky's highest court, serving for a total of 35 years, 1 month, and 1 day.

== Early life and education ==
William Augustus Thomas was born on December 14, 1863, in Fulton, Kentucky, to Francis and Laura (Taylor) Thomas. His father was a farmer, businessman, and confederate veteran. Thomas was educated in rural schools until the age of 16, afterwards attending and graduating from the Murray Male and Female Institute.

For three years, he worked as a teacher as well as a clerk in his father's grocery store. During that time, he studied law independently for eighteen months before taking the entrance exam for Northern Indiana Law School (later Valparaiso University School of Law), which he passed with a score of 98%. He was admitted in 1887, completed the two-year course of study in one-year, and graduated in June 1888.

== Career ==
=== Early career ===
After graduation, Thomas returned to Fulton and entered into private practice. In 1891, he was a candidate for the Democratic nomination for state representative for Fulton and Hickman counties, but withdrew from the race during the district's nominating convention. In 1892, Thomas had moved to Mayfield and by 1895 was speculated as a candidate for state senator. Thomas was selected as a member of Kentucky's "solid silver" delegation the state sent to the 1896 Democratic National Convention, and was the first Kentucky delegate to switch their vote from J. C. S. Blackburn to William Jennings Bryan.

From 1900 to 1908, Thomas served as master commissioner of the Graves County Circuit Court under Judge Joseph E. Robbins. In early 1901, Robbins experienced a decline in his health and took a leave of absence. During this absence, Thomas served as special judge of the court until the Mayfield Bar Association held an election in March, in which Thomas finished last among three candidates. In 1902, Robbins resigned from the bench and joined Thomas in forming a private practice. Together, Thomas and Robbins were described by Judge Mac Swinford as, "...born jury lawyers. Without breach of ethics or being subject to criticism, they knew how to dramatize their case and how to win." Also during this period, Thomas served as city attorney of Mayfield.

During the 1908 presidential election, Thomas was again a supporter and promoter of William Jennings Bryan. He accompanied Bryan on a train tour of the state in 1907, delivered stump speeches on his behalf, and voted for him as a delegate to the 1908 Democratic National Convention.

==== 1910 Court of Appeals election ====
With the increasing popularity of the temperance movement in Western Kentucky, incumbent justice Thomas Jefferson Nunn of the Kentucky Court of Appeals was anticipated to have steep competition for reelection in 1910. Thomas had announced his candidacy in 1906, and was joined by Judge William Reed of Fulton County in being Nunn's foremost challengers.

However, Nunn supporters organized and called a snap convention to be held on August 17, 1909, in Princeton with a prearranged quorum. News of the convention spread slowly, only reaching Paducah the night before, resulting in a limited number of Thomas and Reed allies being able to attend. Despite their opposition to the proceedings, the convention approved a primary election to be held in November, which saw Nunn renominated and subsequently reelected without Republican opposition in 1910.

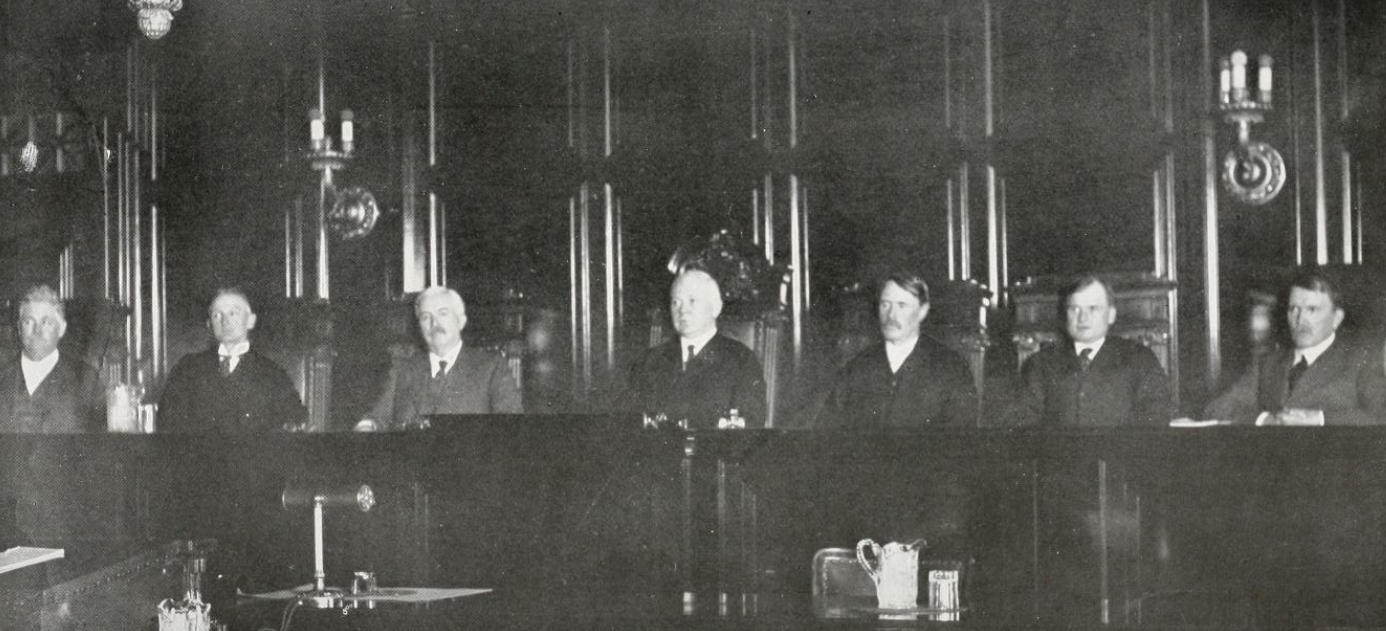
Kentucky Court of Appeals, circa 1915 (Justice Clement Singleton Nunn seated second from right)

==== 1915 Court of Appeals election ====
On February 28, 1914, Nunn resigned from the court due to his declining health. Governor James B. McCreary appointed Nunn's son, Clement Singleton Nunn, to fill his father's seat until a special election could take place the next year.

Three democrats ran in the primary election held on August 7, 1915: Circuit Judge John Fleming Gordon of Madisonville, Nunn, and Thomas. While Thomas had initially announced his candidacy for circuit judge of Kentucky's 1st judicial circuit, he decided to withdraw and instead pursue the court of appeals seat again after Graves County Judge James T. Webb declined to run.

Thomas won the primary election, receiving around 14,000 total votes and comfortable majorities over Nunn and Gordon. He was unopposed in the November 2 general election, and assumed office on December 1.

=== Kentucky Court of Appeals ===
Thomas holds the record for the longest tenure of any member of Kentucky's highest court, serving for a total of 35 years, 1 month, and 1 day. This includes four terms as chief justice: 1926 to 1927, 1929 to January 1931, March to September 1931, and January to April 1939. Following the retirement of Chief Justice Henry J. Tilford in 1945, Thomas stated that he would refuse the position if offered it again.

During his tenure, Thomas wrote over 5,400 opinions. Of his contributions to the court, the Louisville Courier-Journal made special note of his efforts to prevent increasing amounts of debt incurred by local governments. In describing these efforts, Chief Justice Richard Priest Dietzman wrote that, "Although for many years he was a dissenting member the court... [Thomas] has lived to see declared as law his principle that counties, cities, and taxing districts must not incur debts in excess of the income they actually levy."

On June 2, 1935, Thomas was awarded an honorary Doctor of Laws degree from Asbury University.

==== Personality ====
Due to his demeanor during oral arguments, the language he used in his written opinions, and his general personality, Thomas earned a reputation during his tenure on the court as a rugged and colorful character with a "salty wit."

One of the most prominent examples of this was his penchant for coining new words and phrases. Chief Justice James W. Stites referred to these phrases as "Thomasisms," and maintained a glossary of the most notable ones during the years he served on the court alongside Thomas. These included:

- "Numerosity - a great number."
- "Chief ramrod - the leader in an undertaking."
- "Hoodling around - doing nothing much."
- "Piruting - raising the dickens."
- "Freegosity - common law marriage."

In one instance, an attorney making oral arguments before the court referred to a previous case in opposition to Thomas's view as "dictum." Notorious for his stubbornness, Thomas replied that "This court will make it 'sticktum.'" During another instance when Thomas was in a heated debate with Justice William Rogers Clay, he asserted, "Judge Clay, if you can find 'ary bit' of law to support your premise I'll eat it, book, record and even the ribbon that goes with the record."

While often characterized as gruff, his manner of speaking was also seen as humanizing by some. Upon completing his fourth and final term as chief justice in April 1939, the Lexington Herald paid tribute to his service: "Above all his human qualities, his references among legal phrases to plain language understandable to the people, have given to the people of this state a feeling that when they appeal to the highest court it is not to a robe or to a book but to a man, a real man, when he is on the bench."

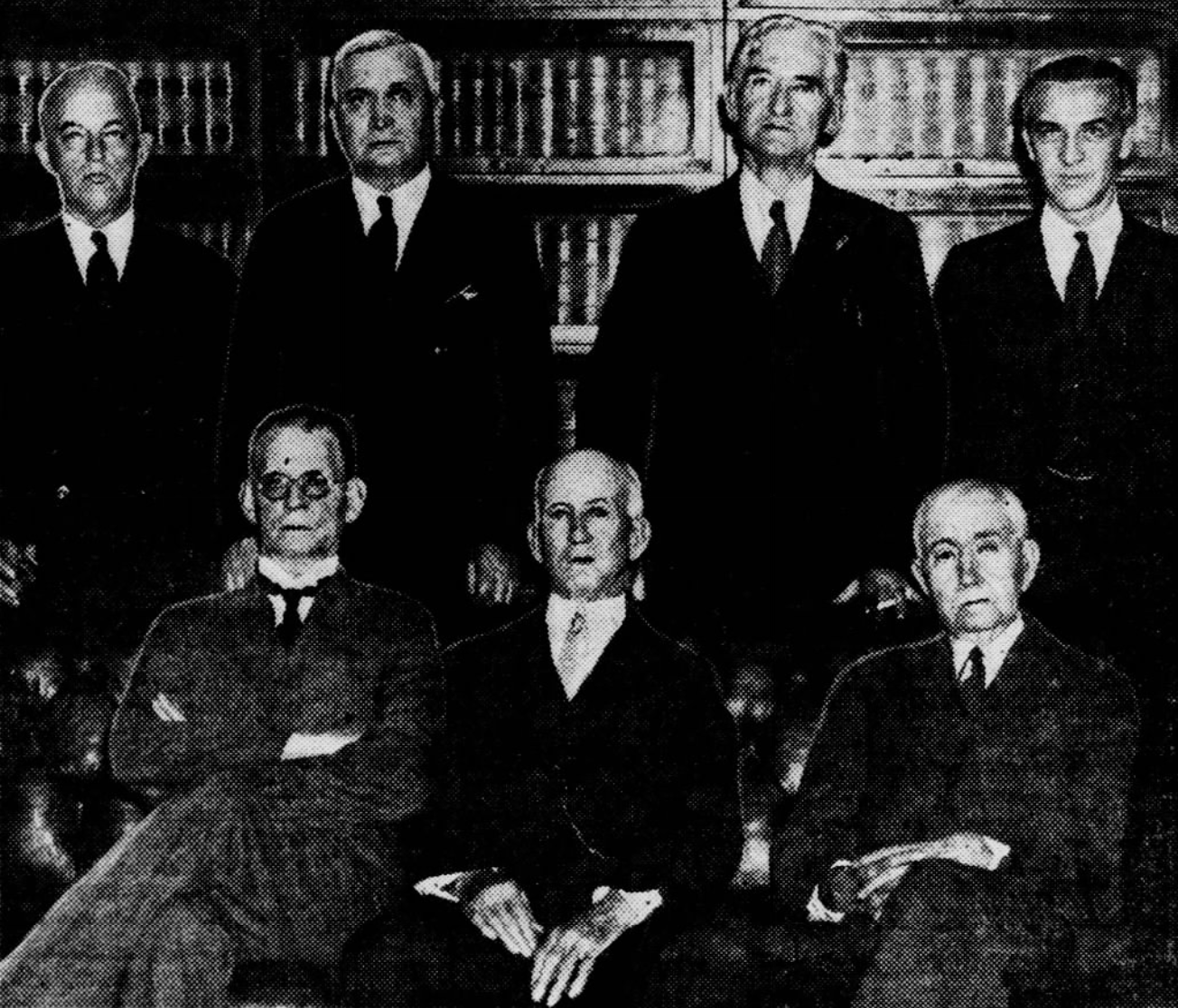
Kentucky Court of Appeals in 1935 (Thomas seated, far right)

Thomas had a lifelong chewing tobacco habit, exemplified by a brass spittoon which was kept consistently adjacent to his chair in the court's chamber. On one occasion, Thomas attempted to use this habit as a way to avoid a European trip his wife had planned for the summer of 1930. During that time, France had an embargo on American tobacco, a fact which he complained about in a three-page letter to Alben Barkley, who Thomas had maintained a regular correspondence and relationship with during Barkley's early career in congress. "You know I would be lost without my chewing tobacco," Thomas wrote in the letter, intending to just complain about the trip. However, three weeks later, Thomas received a response from Barkley's office stating that they had arranged an exception for him to bring his tobacco into the country during his trip. Thomas later said, "They took my last line of defense away from me."

He was also known for frequently playing penny ante poker as well as hearts with members of the Frankfort Fire Department.

As for technology and formalities, Thomas's stubbornness maintained. He loathed the growing usage of telephones, and was displeased when one was installed in his office in the 1920s. Purportedly, he took to unplugging it from the wall due to its constant ringing and declared "Now, ring dern you, I dare you..." whilst clenching his fist. He also disliked black judge's robes, referring to them as "Black night gowns." The court only began to wear them following his retirement in 1951.

==== Retirement ====
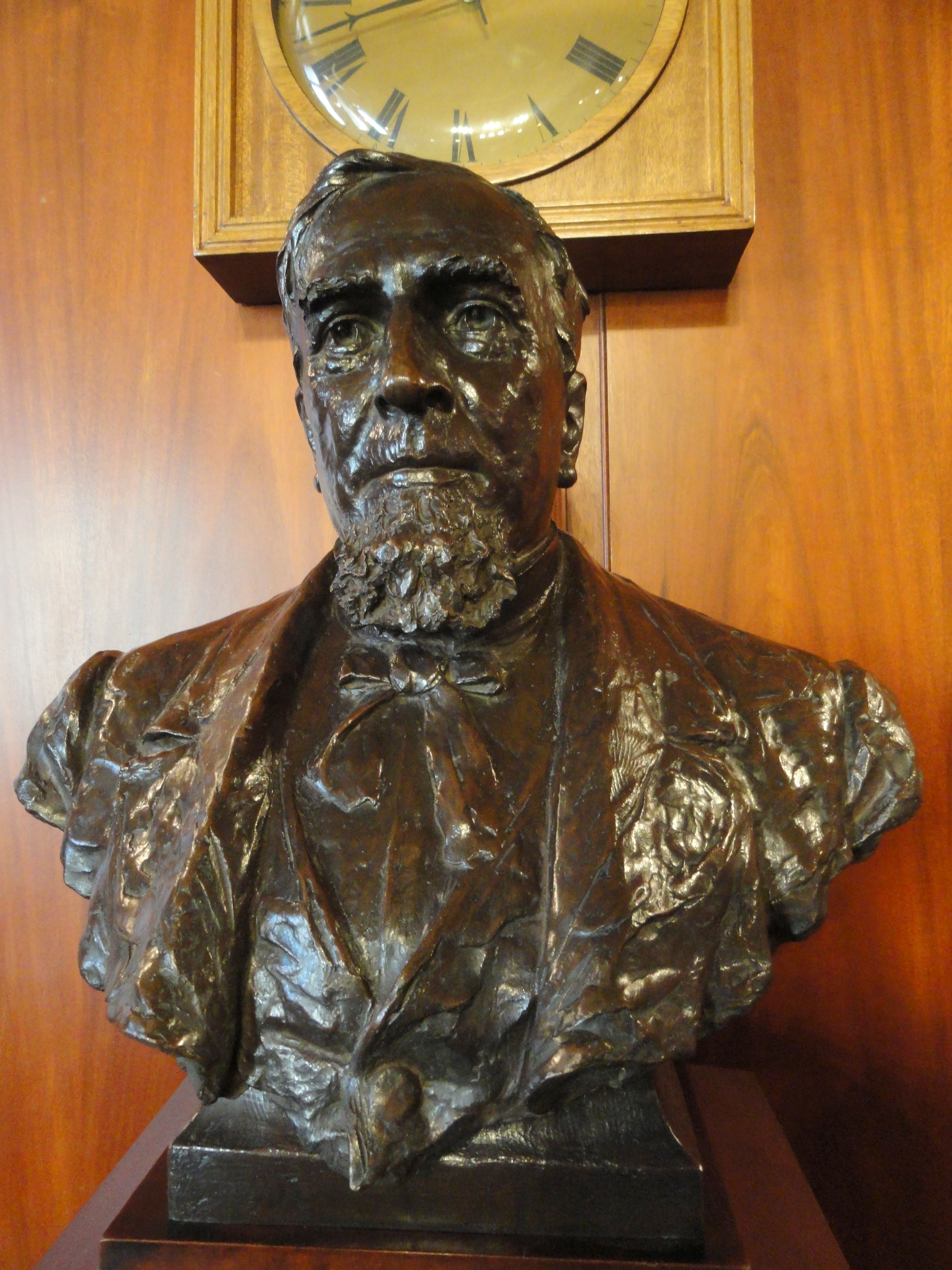
Bust of Justice William S. Pryor located in the Kentucky Supreme Court Chamber. Pryor held the record prior to Thomas for the longest tenure on Kentucky's highest court, serving for twenty-five years (1871–1896).

On April 4, 1940, the Kentucky Bar Association held a dinner in commemoration of Thomas's twenty-fifth year on the bench during their annual convention. Earlier in the year, it had been rumored that Thomas was one of the primary reasons behind a bill which established pensions for retired members of the court of appeals, and as a result his retirement would be imminent. However, during the dinner, Thomas stated his intent to remain in office until he had claimed the record for the longest tenure on the court–which was to be reached the next year–and would afterwards only continue to serve so long as he was physically and mentally able to do so. The previous record holder was William S. Pryor, who was first appointed to the court in 1871 and served for twenty-five-years until his electoral defeat in 1896.

While Thomas had been reelected to the court in 1918, 1926, and 1934 without significant opposition, this was not the case in 1942. Attorney General Hubert Meredith had spent much of his tenure in opposition to Governor Keen Johnson and levied a number of allegations of corruption against his administration. With Thomas viewed as an ally to Johnson, Meredith initially filed to challenge him in the 1942 Democratic primary for his seat on the court. However, after Thomas received Johnson's endorsement and expressing his desire to maintain control over his lawsuits against the governor, Meredith withdrew from the race. After this, Thomas was elected without opposition and stated that it would be his last term on the bench.

On March 11, 1950, Thomas officially announced that he would be retiring at the end of his term. In doing so he stated, "I've been here a long time, and if some other man wants to satisfy his ambition, he ought to have a chance." Thomas was succeeded by Brady M. Stewart on January 2, 1951.

== Personal life ==
=== Family ===
On July 19, 1892, Thomas married Elizabeth Mary Patterson. Described as a lover of the "ornate, social life," Elizabeth was active in many social clubs and organizations such as the Daughters of the American Revolution (DAR), Daughters of Penelope, and the National Society of Arts and Letters.

The two had one daughter, Anita Delia, who married Kenneth G. McConnell. McConnell was an arborist, having graduated from the Biltmore School of Forestry, and served as the state forestry director during the administrations of Governor Ruby Laffoon, Happy Chandler, Keen Johnson, and Simeon Willis. Their first born son was named Gus Thomas McConnell in honor of his grandfather; he would pursue a career as an attorney and graduated from Harvard Law School.

=== Name ===
Thomas despised the length of his birth name, and began to exclusively use the name Gus early in his career. He once stated, "My name is 'Gus Thomas' ... 'G-U-S' ... with no embellishments." On multiple occasions, he berated journalists for using the incorrect name when referring to either himself or his wife in their articles.

== Death ==
On June 3, 1951, five months after his retirement from the court, Thomas died from complications of kidney failure at Kings Daughters Hospital in Frankfort.

He is buried in Frankfort Cemetery alongside his wife. His tombstone quotes the epitaph of South Carolina Attorney General James L. Petigru: "His wisdom and his wit may fade, but his learning illuminated the principles of law."
