= 1924 United States Senate election in Kentucky =

- November 4, 1924
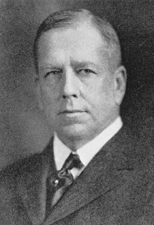

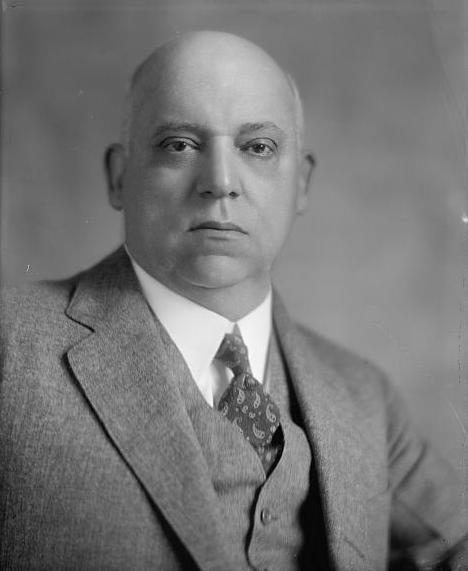
Nominee	Frederic M. Sackett	Augustus Owsley Stanley
Party	Republican	Democratic
Popular vote	406,121	381,605
Percentage	51.56%	48.44%
- County results Sackett: 50–60% 60–70% 70–80% 80–90% >90% Stanley: 50–60% 60–70% 70–80% 80–90%
U.S. senator before election
Augustus Owsley Stanley
Democratic
Elected U.S. Senator
Frederic M. Sackett
Democratic

The 1924 United States Senate election in Kentucky took place on November 4, 1924. Incumbent Democratic Senator Augustus Owsley Stanley ran for re-election to a second term, but was defeated by Republican Frederic M. Sackett.

This was the first election that Republicans won this seat, and the first time that Republicans simultaneously held both Senate seats.

== Primary elections ==
=== Democratic primary ===
==== Candidates ====
- John J. Howe
- Augustus Owsley Stanley, incumbent U.S. senator

==== Results ====
Primary results by county Stanley: 50%–60%; 60%–70%; 70%–80%; 80%–90%; 90%–100%; Howe: 50%–60%; 60%–70%; 70%–80%; 80%–90%

Democratic primary results
Party	Candidate	Votes	%
Democratic	Augustus Owsley Stanley (incumbent)	88,286	58.76
Democratic	John J. Howe	61,950	41.24
Total votes		150,236	100.00

=== Republican primary ===
==== Candidates ====
- Burgess Bethurum
- Frederic M. Sackett, director of the Federal Reserve Bank branch of Louisville

==== Results ====
Primary results by county Sackett: 50%–60%; 60%–70%; 70%–80%; 80%–90%; 90%–100%; Bethurum: 50%–60%; 60%–70%; 70%–80%; 90%–100%

Republican primary results
Party	Candidate	Votes	%
Republican	Frederic M. Sackett	63,186	70.88
Republican	Burgess Bethurum	25,965	29.12
Total votes		89,151	100.00

== General election ==
=== Candidates ===
- Frederic M. Sackett, director of the Federal Reserve Bank branch of Louisville (Republican)
- Augustus Owsley Stanley, incumbent Senator since 1919 (Democratic)

=== Results ===
1924 U.S. Senate election in Kentucky
Party	Candidate	Votes	%	±%
Republican	Frederic M. Sackett	406,121	51.56%	
Democratic	Augustus Owsley Stanley (incumbent)	381,605	48.44%	
Total votes		787,726	100.00%	
Republican gain from Democratic		Swing		

== See also ==
- 1924 United States Senate elections
