= List of United States senators from Kentucky =

Current delegation

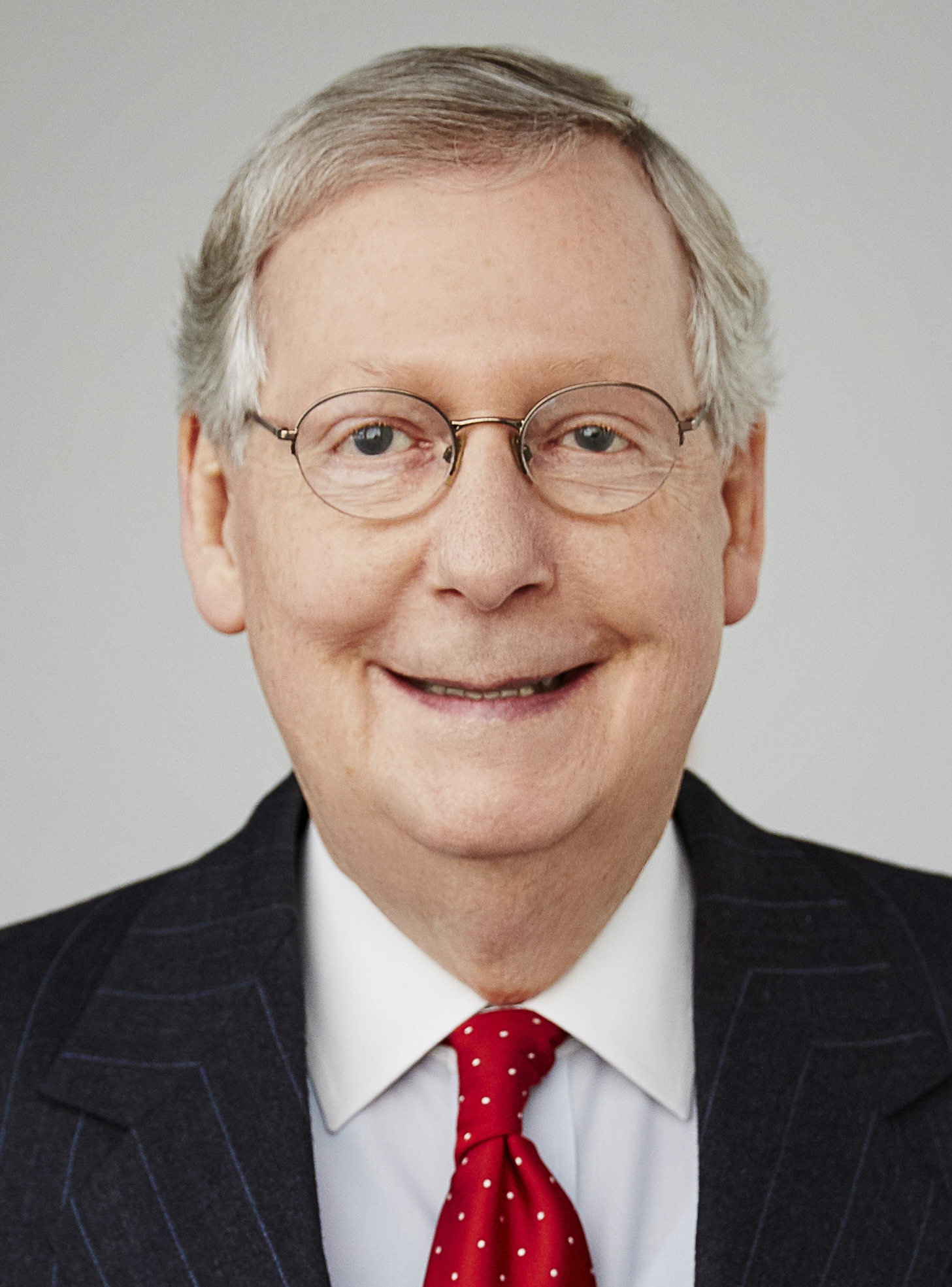
Mitch McConnell
(R)

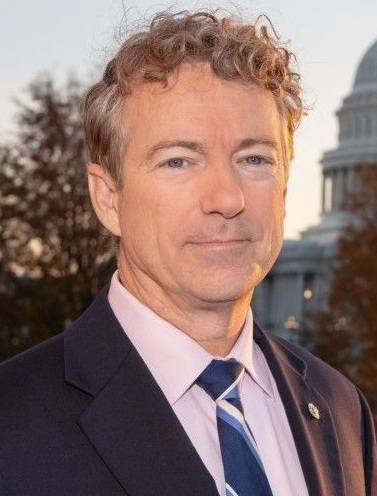
Rand Paul
(R)

(ordered by seniority)

This is a list of United States senators from Kentucky. The state's senators belong to class 2 and class 3. Kentucky is currently represented in the U.S. Senate by Republicans Mitch McConnell (serving since 1985) and Rand Paul (serving since 2011). Currently, on his seventh term in office, McConnell is Kentucky's longest-serving senator.

== List of senators ==
Class 2 Class 2 senators belong to the electoral cycle that most recently had regular elections in 2008, 2014, 2020, and 2026. The next election will be in 2032.						C	Class 3 Class 3 senators belong to the electoral cycle that most recently had regular elections in 2004, 2010, 2016, and 2022. The next election will be in 2028.					
#	Senator	Party	Dates in office	Electoral history	T	C	T	Electoral history	Dates in office	Party	Senator	#
Vacant			June 1, 1792 – June 18, 1792	Kentucky elected its senators a couple of weeks after statehood.	1	2nd	1	Kentucky elected its senators a couple of weeks after statehood.	June 1, 1792 – June 18, 1792	Vacant		
1	John Brown (Frankfort)	Anti- Admin.	June 18, 1792 – March 3, 1805	Elected in 1792.	1	2nd	1	Elected in 1792.	June 18, 1792 – March 3, 1795	Anti- Admin.	John Edwards (Paris)	1
1	John Brown (Frankfort)	Anti- Admin.	June 18, 1792 – March 3, 1805	Re-elected in 1792.	2	3rd	1	Elected in 1792.	June 18, 1792 – March 3, 1795	Anti- Admin.	John Edwards (Paris)	1
1	John Brown (Frankfort)	Democratic- Republican	June 18, 1792 – March 3, 1805	Re-elected in 1792.	2	4th	2	Elected in 1794. Lost re-election.	March 4, 1795 – March 3, 1801	Federalist	Humphrey Marshall (Lexington)	2
1	John Brown (Frankfort)	Democratic- Republican	June 18, 1792 – March 3, 1805	Re-elected in 1792.	2	5th	2	Elected in 1794. Lost re-election.	March 4, 1795 – March 3, 1801	Federalist	Humphrey Marshall (Lexington)	2
1	John Brown (Frankfort)	Democratic- Republican	June 18, 1792 – March 3, 1805	Re-elected in 1798. Lost re-election.	3	6th	2	Elected in 1794. Lost re-election.	March 4, 1795 – March 3, 1801	Federalist	Humphrey Marshall (Lexington)	2
1	John Brown (Frankfort)	Democratic- Republican	June 18, 1792 – March 3, 1805	Re-elected in 1798. Lost re-election.	3	7th	3	Elected in 1800. Resigned to become U.S. Attorney General.	March 4, 1801 – August 7, 1805	Democratic- Republican	John Breckinridge (Lexington)	3
1	John Brown (Frankfort)	Democratic- Republican	June 18, 1792 – March 3, 1805	Re-elected in 1798. Lost re-election.	3	8th	3	Elected in 1800. Resigned to become U.S. Attorney General.	March 4, 1801 – August 7, 1805	Democratic- Republican	John Breckinridge (Lexington)	3
2	Buckner Thruston (Lexington)	Democratic- Republican	March 4, 1805 – December 18, 1809	Elected in 1804. Resigned to become judge of the U.S. Circuit Court.	4	9th	3	Elected in 1800. Resigned to become U.S. Attorney General.	March 4, 1801 – August 7, 1805	Democratic- Republican	John Breckinridge (Lexington)	3
2	Buckner Thruston (Lexington)	Democratic- Republican	March 4, 1805 – December 18, 1809	Elected in 1804. Resigned to become judge of the U.S. Circuit Court.	4	9th	3		August 7, 1805 – November 8, 1805	Vacant		
2	Buckner Thruston (Lexington)	Democratic- Republican	March 4, 1805 – December 18, 1809	Elected in 1804. Resigned to become judge of the U.S. Circuit Court.	4	9th	3	Elected to finish Breckinridge's term. Lost re-election and resigned because of participation in the Burr conspiracy.	November 8, 1805 – November 18, 1806	Democratic- Republican	John Adair (Harrodsburg)	4
2	Buckner Thruston (Lexington)	Democratic- Republican	March 4, 1805 – December 18, 1809	Elected in 1804. Resigned to become judge of the U.S. Circuit Court.	4	9th	3	Elected to finish Adair's term, despite not meeting the constitutional age minimum. Retired.	November 19, 1806 – March 3, 1807	Democratic- Republican	Henry Clay (Lexington)	5
2	Buckner Thruston (Lexington)	Democratic- Republican	March 4, 1805 – December 18, 1809	Elected in 1804. Resigned to become judge of the U.S. Circuit Court.	4	10th	4	Elected in 1806. Retired.	March 4, 1807 – March 3, 1813	Democratic- Republican	John Pope (Springfield)	6
2	Buckner Thruston (Lexington)	Democratic- Republican	March 4, 1805 – December 18, 1809	Elected in 1804. Resigned to become judge of the U.S. Circuit Court.	4	11th	4	Elected in 1806. Retired.	March 4, 1807 – March 3, 1813	Democratic- Republican	John Pope (Springfield)	6
Vacant			December 18, 1809 – January 10, 1810		4	11th	4	Elected in 1806. Retired.	March 4, 1807 – March 3, 1813	Democratic- Republican	John Pope (Springfield)	6
3	Henry Clay (Lexington)	Democratic- Republican	January 10, 1810 – March 3, 1811	Appointed to finish Thruston's term. Retired.	4	11th	4	Elected in 1806. Retired.	March 4, 1807 – March 3, 1813	Democratic- Republican	John Pope (Springfield)	6
4	George M. Bibb (Lexington)	Democratic- Republican	March 4, 1811 – August 23, 1814	Elected in 1811. Resigned to return to private practice.	5	12th	4	Elected in 1806. Retired.	March 4, 1807 – March 3, 1813	Democratic- Republican	John Pope (Springfield)	6
4	George M. Bibb (Lexington)	Democratic- Republican	March 4, 1811 – August 23, 1814	Elected in 1811. Resigned to return to private practice.	5	13th	5	Elected in 1813. Resigned.	March 4, 1813 – December 24, 1814	Democratic-Republican	Jesse Bledsoe (Lexington)	7
Vacant			August 23, 1814 – August 30, 1814		5	13th	5	Elected in 1813. Resigned.	March 4, 1813 – December 24, 1814	Democratic-Republican	Jesse Bledsoe (Lexington)	7
5	George Walker (Nicholasville)	Democratic- Republican	August 30, 1814 – February 2, 1815	Appointed to continue Bibb's term. Successor qualified.	5	13th	5	Elected in 1813. Resigned.	March 4, 1813 – December 24, 1814	Democratic-Republican	Jesse Bledsoe (Lexington)	7
6	William Barry (Lexington)	Democratic- Republican	February 2, 1815 – May 1, 1816	Elected to finish Bibb's term. Resigned to become judge of the Kentucky Circuit Court.	5	13th	5	Elected in 1813. Resigned.	March 4, 1813 – December 24, 1814	Democratic-Republican	Jesse Bledsoe (Lexington)	7
6	William Barry (Lexington)	Democratic- Republican	February 2, 1815 – May 1, 1816	Elected to finish Bibb's term. Resigned to become judge of the Kentucky Circuit Court.	5	13th	5		December 24, 1814 – February 2, 1815	Vacant		
6	William Barry (Lexington)	Democratic- Republican	February 2, 1815 – May 1, 1816	Elected to finish Bibb's term. Resigned to become judge of the Kentucky Circuit Court.	5	13th	5	Elected in 1815 to finish Bledsoe's term. Retired or lost re-election.	February 2, 1815 – March 3, 1819	Democratic-Republican	Isham Talbot (Frankfort)	8
6	William Barry (Lexington)	Democratic- Republican	February 2, 1815 – May 1, 1816	Elected to finish Bibb's term. Resigned to become judge of the Kentucky Circuit Court.	5	14th	5	Elected in 1815 to finish Bledsoe's term. Retired or lost re-election.	February 2, 1815 – March 3, 1819	Democratic-Republican	Isham Talbot (Frankfort)	8
Vacant			May 1, 1816 – November 3, 1816		5	14th	5	Elected in 1815 to finish Bledsoe's term. Retired or lost re-election.	February 2, 1815 – March 3, 1819	Democratic-Republican	Isham Talbot (Frankfort)	8
7	Martin Hardin (Frankfort)	Democratic-Republican	November 3, 1816 – March 3, 1817	Appointed to continue Bibb's term. Elected in 1816 to finish Bibb's term Retired.	5	14th	5	Elected in 1815 to finish Bledsoe's term. Retired or lost re-election.	February 2, 1815 – March 3, 1819	Democratic-Republican	Isham Talbot (Frankfort)	8
8	John J. Crittenden (Russellville)	Democratic- Republican	March 4, 1817 – March 3, 1819	Elected in 1816. Resigned to return to private practice.	6	15th	5	Elected in 1815 to finish Bledsoe's term. Retired or lost re-election.	February 2, 1815 – March 3, 1819	Democratic-Republican	Isham Talbot (Frankfort)	8
Vacant			March 3, 1819 – December 10, 1819		6	16th	6	Elected in 1818. Resigned to run for governor.	March 4, 1819 – May 28, 1820	Democratic-Republican	William Logan (Shelbyville)	9
9	Richard Mentor Johnson (Great Crossing)	Democratic- Republican	December 10, 1819 – March 3, 1829	Elected to finish Crittenden's term.	6	16th	6	Elected in 1818. Resigned to run for governor.	March 4, 1819 – May 28, 1820	Democratic-Republican	William Logan (Shelbyville)	9
9	Richard Mentor Johnson (Great Crossing)	Democratic- Republican	December 10, 1819 – March 3, 1829	Elected to finish Crittenden's term.	6	16th	6		May 28, 1820 – October 19, 1820	Vacant		
9	Richard Mentor Johnson (Great Crossing)	Democratic- Republican	December 10, 1819 – March 3, 1829	Elected to finish Crittenden's term.	6	16th	6	Elected to finish Logan's term. Retired or lost re-election.	October 19, 1820– March 3, 1825	Democratic-Republican	Isham Talbot (Frankfort)	10
9	Richard Mentor Johnson (Great Crossing)	Democratic- Republican	December 10, 1819 – March 3, 1829	Elected to finish Crittenden's term.	6	17th	6	Elected to finish Logan's term. Retired or lost re-election.	October 19, 1820– March 3, 1825	Democratic-Republican	Isham Talbot (Frankfort)	10
9	Richard Mentor Johnson (Great Crossing)	Democratic- Republican	December 10, 1819 – March 3, 1829	Re-elected in 1823. Lost re-election.	7	18th	6	Elected to finish Logan's term. Retired or lost re-election.	October 19, 1820– March 3, 1825	Democratic-Republican	Isham Talbot (Frankfort)	10
9	Richard Mentor Johnson (Great Crossing)	Jacksonian	December 10, 1819 – March 3, 1829	Re-elected in 1823. Lost re-election.	7	19th	7	Election year unknown. Retired or lost re-election.	March 4, 1825 – March 3, 1831	Jacksonian	John Rowan (Louisville)	11
9	Richard Mentor Johnson (Great Crossing)	Jacksonian	December 10, 1819 – March 3, 1829	Re-elected in 1823. Lost re-election.	7	20th	7	Election year unknown. Retired or lost re-election.	March 4, 1825 – March 3, 1831	Jacksonian	John Rowan (Louisville)	11
10	George M. Bibb (Yellow Banks)	Jacksonian	March 4, 1829 – March 3, 1835	Elected in 1829. Retired or lost re-election.	8	21st	7	Election year unknown. Retired or lost re-election.	March 4, 1825 – March 3, 1831	Jacksonian	John Rowan (Louisville)	11
10	George M. Bibb (Yellow Banks)	Jacksonian	March 4, 1829 – March 3, 1835	Elected in 1829. Retired or lost re-election.	8	22nd	8		March 4, 1831 – November 10, 1831	Vacant		
10	George M. Bibb (Yellow Banks)	Jacksonian	March 4, 1829 – March 3, 1835	Elected in 1829. Retired or lost re-election.	8	22nd	8	Elected late in 1831.	November 10, 1831 – March 31, 1842	National; Republican	Henry Clay (Lexington)	12
10	George M. Bibb (Yellow Banks)	Jacksonian	March 4, 1829 – March 3, 1835	Elected in 1829. Retired or lost re-election.	8	23rd	8	Elected late in 1831.	November 10, 1831 – March 31, 1842	National; Republican	Henry Clay (Lexington)	12
11	John J. Crittenden (Frankfort)	National; Republican	March 4, 1835 – March 3, 1841	Elected in 1835. Retired.	9	24th	8	Elected late in 1831.	November 10, 1831 – March 31, 1842	National; Republican	Henry Clay (Lexington)	12
11	John J. Crittenden (Frankfort)	Whig	March 4, 1835 – March 3, 1841	Elected in 1835. Retired.	9	25th	9	Re-elected in 1836. Resigned.	November 10, 1831 – March 31, 1842	Whig	Henry Clay (Lexington)	12
11	John J. Crittenden (Frankfort)	Whig	March 4, 1835 – March 3, 1841	Elected in 1835. Retired.	9	26th	9	Re-elected in 1836. Resigned.	November 10, 1831 – March 31, 1842	Whig	Henry Clay (Lexington)	12
12	James T. Morehead (Covington)	Whig	March 4, 1841 – March 3, 1847	Elected in 1841. Retired to continue his law practice.	10	27th	9	Re-elected in 1836. Resigned.	November 10, 1831 – March 31, 1842	Whig	Henry Clay (Lexington)	12
12	James T. Morehead (Covington)	Whig	March 4, 1841 – March 3, 1847	Elected in 1841. Retired to continue his law practice.	10	27th	9	Elected to finish Clay's term.	March 31, 1842 – June 12, 1848	Whig	John J. Crittenden (Frankfort)	13
12	James T. Morehead (Covington)	Whig	March 4, 1841 – March 3, 1847	Elected in 1841. Retired to continue his law practice.	10	28th	10	Re-elected in 1843. Resigned to become Governor of Kentucky.	March 31, 1842 – June 12, 1848	Whig	John J. Crittenden (Frankfort)	13
12	James T. Morehead (Covington)	Whig	March 4, 1841 – March 3, 1847	Elected in 1841. Retired to continue his law practice.	10	29th	10	Re-elected in 1843. Resigned to become Governor of Kentucky.	March 31, 1842 – June 12, 1848	Whig	John J. Crittenden (Frankfort)	13
13	Joseph R. Underwood (Bowling Green)	Whig	March 4, 1847 – March 3, 1853	Election year unknown. Retired.	11	30th	10	Re-elected in 1843. Resigned to become Governor of Kentucky.	March 31, 1842 – June 12, 1848	Whig	John J. Crittenden (Frankfort)	13
13	Joseph R. Underwood (Bowling Green)	Whig	March 4, 1847 – March 3, 1853	Election year unknown. Retired.	11	30th	10		June 12, 1848 – June 23, 1848	Vacant		
13	Joseph R. Underwood (Bowling Green)	Whig	March 4, 1847 – March 3, 1853	Election year unknown. Retired.	11	30th	10	Appointed to continue Crittenden's term. Elected in 1849 to finish Crittenden's term. Retired or lost re-election.	June 23, 1848 – March 3, 1849	Whig	Thomas Metcalfe (Forest Retreat)	14
13	Joseph R. Underwood (Bowling Green)	Whig	March 4, 1847 – March 3, 1853	Election year unknown. Retired.	11	31st	11	Elected in 1849. Submitted resignation, but died early.	March 4, 1849 – June 24, 1852	Whig	Henry Clay (Lexington)	15
13	Joseph R. Underwood (Bowling Green)	Whig	March 4, 1847 – March 3, 1853	Election year unknown. Retired.	11	32nd	11	Elected in 1849. Submitted resignation, but died early.	March 4, 1849 – June 24, 1852	Whig	Henry Clay (Lexington)	15
13	Joseph R. Underwood (Bowling Green)	Whig	March 4, 1847 – March 3, 1853	Election year unknown. Retired.	11	32nd	11		June 24, 1852 – July 6, 1852	Vacant		
13	Joseph R. Underwood (Bowling Green)	Whig	March 4, 1847 – March 3, 1853	Election year unknown. Retired.	11	32nd	11	Appointed to continue Clay's term. Lost election to finish Clay's term.	July 6, 1852 – August 31, 1852	Democratic	David Meriwether (Louisville)	16
13	Joseph R. Underwood (Bowling Green)	Whig	March 4, 1847 – March 3, 1853	Election year unknown. Retired.	11	32nd	11	Elected in 1851 to finish Clay's term, in anticipation of Clay's resignation. Retired.	September 1, 1852 – March 3, 1855	Whig	Archibald Dixon (Henderson)	17
14	John B. Thompson (Harrodsburg)	Know Nothing	March 4, 1853 – March 3, 1859	Elected in 1851. Retired or lost re-election.	12	33rd	11	Elected in 1851 to finish Clay's term, in anticipation of Clay's resignation. Retired.	September 1, 1852 – March 3, 1855	Whig	Archibald Dixon (Henderson)	17
14	John B. Thompson (Harrodsburg)	Know Nothing	March 4, 1853 – March 3, 1859	Elected in 1851. Retired or lost re-election.	12	34th	12	Elected in 1854. Retired.	March 4, 1855– March 3, 1861	Whig	John J. Crittenden (Frankfort)	18
14	John B. Thompson (Harrodsburg)	Know Nothing	March 4, 1853 – March 3, 1859	Elected in 1851. Retired or lost re-election.	12	35th	12	Elected in 1854. Retired.	March 4, 1855– March 3, 1861	Know Nothing	John J. Crittenden (Frankfort)	18
15	Lazarus W. Powell (Henderson)	Democratic	March 4, 1859 – March 3, 1865	Elected in 1858. Retired to run for U.S. President.	13	36th	12	Elected in 1854. Retired.	March 4, 1855– March 3, 1861	Know Nothing	John J. Crittenden (Frankfort)	18
15	Lazarus W. Powell (Henderson)	Democratic	March 4, 1859 – March 3, 1865	Elected in 1858. Retired to run for U.S. President.	13	37th	13	Elected in 1859. Expelled for supporting the Confederacy.	March 4, 1861 – December 4, 1861	Democratic	John C. Breckinridge (Lexington)	19
15	Lazarus W. Powell (Henderson)	Democratic	March 4, 1859 – March 3, 1865	Elected in 1858. Retired to run for U.S. President.	13	37th	13		December 4, 1861 – December 10, 1861	Vacant		
15	Lazarus W. Powell (Henderson)	Democratic	March 4, 1859 – March 3, 1865	Elected in 1858. Retired to run for U.S. President.	13	37th	13	Elected to finish Breckinridge's term.	December 10, 1861 – September 22, 1872	Union Democratic	Garrett Davis (Paris)	20
15	Lazarus W. Powell (Henderson)	Democratic	March 4, 1859 – March 3, 1865	Elected in 1858. Retired to run for U.S. President.	13	38th	13	Elected to finish Breckinridge's term.	December 10, 1861 – September 22, 1872	Union Democratic	Garrett Davis (Paris)	20
16	James Guthrie (Louisville)	Democratic	March 4, 1865 – February 7, 1868	Elected in 1865. Resigned due to ill health.	14	39th	13	Elected to finish Breckinridge's term.	December 10, 1861 – September 22, 1872	Union Democratic	Garrett Davis (Paris)	20
16	James Guthrie (Louisville)	Democratic	March 4, 1865 – February 7, 1868	Elected in 1865. Resigned due to ill health.	14	40th	14	Re-elected in 1867. Died.	December 10, 1861 – September 22, 1872	Democratic	Garrett Davis (Paris)	20
Vacant			February 7, 1868 – February 19, 1868		14	40th	14	Re-elected in 1867. Died.	December 10, 1861 – September 22, 1872	Democratic	Garrett Davis (Paris)	20
17	Thomas C. McCreery (Owensboro)	Democratic	February 19, 1868 – March 3, 1871	Elected to finish Guthrie's term. Lost re-election.	14	40th	14	Re-elected in 1867. Died.	December 10, 1861 – September 22, 1872	Democratic	Garrett Davis (Paris)	20
17	Thomas C. McCreery (Owensboro)	Democratic	February 19, 1868 – March 3, 1871	Elected to finish Guthrie's term. Lost re-election.	14	41st	14	Re-elected in 1867. Died.	December 10, 1861 – September 22, 1872	Democratic	Garrett Davis (Paris)	20
18	John W. Stevenson (Covington)	Democratic	March 4, 1871 – March 3, 1877	Elected in 1869. Retired.	15	42nd	14	Re-elected in 1867. Died.	December 10, 1861 – September 22, 1872	Democratic	Garrett Davis (Paris)	20
18	John W. Stevenson (Covington)	Democratic	March 4, 1871 – March 3, 1877	Elected in 1869. Retired.	15	42nd	14		September 22, 1872 – September 27, 1872	Vacant		
18	John W. Stevenson (Covington)	Democratic	March 4, 1871 – March 3, 1877	Elected in 1869. Retired.	15	42nd	14	Appointed to continue Davis's term. Elected in 1873 to finish Davis's term. Retired or lost re-election.	September 27, 1872 – March 3, 1873	Democratic	Willis B. Machen (Eddyville)	21
18	John W. Stevenson (Covington)	Democratic	March 4, 1871 – March 3, 1877	Elected in 1869. Retired.	15	43rd	15	Elected in 1871. Retired.	March 4, 1873 – March 3, 1879	Democratic	Thomas C. McCreery (Owensboro)	22
18	John W. Stevenson (Covington)	Democratic	March 4, 1871 – March 3, 1877	Elected in 1869. Retired.	15	44th	15	Elected in 1871. Retired.	March 4, 1873 – March 3, 1879	Democratic	Thomas C. McCreery (Owensboro)	22
19	James B. Beck (Lexington)	Democratic	March 4, 1877 – May 3, 1890	Elected in 1876.	16	45th	15	Elected in 1871. Retired.	March 4, 1873 – March 3, 1879	Democratic	Thomas C. McCreery (Owensboro)	22
19	James B. Beck (Lexington)	Democratic	March 4, 1877 – May 3, 1890	Elected in 1876.	16	46th	16	Elected in 1878. Lost re-election.	March 4, 1879 – March 3, 1885	Democratic	John Stuart Williams (Mount Sterling)	23
19	James B. Beck (Lexington)	Democratic	March 4, 1877 – May 3, 1890	Elected in 1876.	16	47th	16	Elected in 1878. Lost re-election.	March 4, 1879 – March 3, 1885	Democratic	John Stuart Williams (Mount Sterling)	23
19	James B. Beck (Lexington)	Democratic	March 4, 1877 – May 3, 1890	Re-elected in 1881.	17	48th	16	Elected in 1878. Lost re-election.	March 4, 1879 – March 3, 1885	Democratic	John Stuart Williams (Mount Sterling)	23
19	James B. Beck (Lexington)	Democratic	March 4, 1877 – May 3, 1890	Re-elected in 1881.	17	49th	17	Elected in 1884.	March 4, 1885 – March 3, 1897	Democratic	J. C. S. Blackburn (Versailles)	24
19	James B. Beck (Lexington)	Democratic	March 4, 1877 – May 3, 1890	Re-elected in 1881.	17	50th	17	Elected in 1884.	March 4, 1885 – March 3, 1897	Democratic	J. C. S. Blackburn (Versailles)	24
19	James B. Beck (Lexington)	Democratic	March 4, 1877 – May 3, 1890	Re-elected in 1888. Died.	18	51st	17	Elected in 1884.	March 4, 1885 – March 3, 1897	Democratic	J. C. S. Blackburn (Versailles)	24
Vacant			May 3, 1890 – May 26, 1890		18	51st	17	Elected in 1884.	March 4, 1885 – March 3, 1897	Democratic	J. C. S. Blackburn (Versailles)	24
20	John G. Carlisle (Covington)	Democratic	May 26, 1890 – February 4, 1893	Elected to finish Beck's term. Resigned.	18	51st	17	Elected in 1884.	March 4, 1885 – March 3, 1897	Democratic	J. C. S. Blackburn (Versailles)	24
20	John G. Carlisle (Covington)	Democratic	May 26, 1890 – February 4, 1893	Elected to finish Beck's term. Resigned.	18	52nd	18	Re-elected in 1890. Lost re-election.	March 4, 1885 – March 3, 1897	Democratic	J. C. S. Blackburn (Versailles)	24
Vacant			February 4, 1893 – February 15, 1893		18	52nd	18	Re-elected in 1890. Lost re-election.	March 4, 1885 – March 3, 1897	Democratic	J. C. S. Blackburn (Versailles)	24
21	William Lindsay (Frankfort)	Democratic	February 15, 1893 – March 3, 1901	Elected to finish Carlisle's term.	18	52nd	18	Re-elected in 1890. Lost re-election.	March 4, 1885 – March 3, 1897	Democratic	J. C. S. Blackburn (Versailles)	24
21	William Lindsay (Frankfort)	Democratic	February 15, 1893 – March 3, 1901	Elected to finish Carlisle's term.	18	53rd	18	Re-elected in 1890. Lost re-election.	March 4, 1885 – March 3, 1897	Democratic	J. C. S. Blackburn (Versailles)	24
21	William Lindsay (Frankfort)	Democratic	February 15, 1893 – March 3, 1901	Re-elected in 1894. Retired.	19	54th	18	Re-elected in 1890. Lost re-election.	March 4, 1885 – March 3, 1897	Democratic	J. C. S. Blackburn (Versailles)	24
21	William Lindsay (Frankfort)	Democratic	February 15, 1893 – March 3, 1901	Re-elected in 1894. Retired.	19	55th	19	Legislature failed to elect.	March 4, 1897 – April 28, 1897	Vacant		
21	William Lindsay (Frankfort)	Democratic	February 15, 1893 – March 3, 1901	Re-elected in 1894. Retired.	19	55th	19	Elected in 1897 to finish vacant term. Retired.	April 29, 1897 – March 3, 1903	Republican	William J. Deboe (Marion)	25
21	William Lindsay (Frankfort)	Democratic	February 15, 1893 – March 3, 1901	Re-elected in 1894. Retired.	19	56th	19	Elected in 1897 to finish vacant term. Retired.	April 29, 1897 – March 3, 1903	Republican	William J. Deboe (Marion)	25
22	J. C. S. Blackburn (Versailles)	Democratic	March 4, 1901 – March 3, 1907	Elected in 1900. Lost re-election.	20	57th	19	Elected in 1897 to finish vacant term. Retired.	April 29, 1897 – March 3, 1903	Republican	William J. Deboe (Marion)	25
22	J. C. S. Blackburn (Versailles)	Democratic	March 4, 1901 – March 3, 1907	Elected in 1900. Lost re-election.	20	58th	20	Elected in 1902. Lost renomination.	March 4, 1903 – March 3, 1909	Democratic	James B. McCreary (Richmond)	26
22	J. C. S. Blackburn (Versailles)	Democratic	March 4, 1901 – March 3, 1907	Elected in 1900. Lost re-election.	20	59th	20	Elected in 1902. Lost renomination.	March 4, 1903 – March 3, 1909	Democratic	James B. McCreary (Richmond)	26
23	Thomas H. Paynter (Frankfort)	Democratic	March 4, 1907 – March 3, 1913	Elected in 1906. Retired.	21	60th	20	Elected in 1902. Lost renomination.	March 4, 1903 – March 3, 1909	Democratic	James B. McCreary (Richmond)	26
23	Thomas H. Paynter (Frankfort)	Democratic	March 4, 1907 – March 3, 1913	Elected in 1906. Retired.	21	61st	21	Elected in 1908. Died.	March 4, 1909 – May 23, 1914	Republican	William O. Bradley (Louisville)	27
23	Thomas H. Paynter (Frankfort)	Democratic	March 4, 1907 – March 3, 1913	Elected in 1906. Retired.	21	62nd	21	Elected in 1908. Died.	March 4, 1909 – May 23, 1914	Republican	William O. Bradley (Louisville)	27
24	Ollie Murray James (Marion)	Democratic	March 4, 1913 – August 28, 1918	Elected in 1912. Died.	22	63rd	21	Elected in 1908. Died.	March 4, 1909 – May 23, 1914	Republican	William O. Bradley (Louisville)	27
24	Ollie Murray James (Marion)	Democratic	March 4, 1913 – August 28, 1918	Elected in 1912. Died.	22	63rd	21		May 23, 1914 – June 16, 1914	Vacant		
24	Ollie Murray James (Marion)	Democratic	March 4, 1913 – August 28, 1918	Elected in 1912. Died.	22	63rd	21	Appointed to continue Bradley's term. Elected in 1914 to finish Bradley's term. Retired.	June 16, 1914 – March 3, 1915	Democratic	Johnson N. Camden Jr. (Versailles)	28
24	Ollie Murray James (Marion)	Democratic	March 4, 1913 – August 28, 1918	Elected in 1912. Died.	22	64th	22	Elected in 1914. Lost re-election.	March 4, 1915 – March 3, 1921	Democratic	J. C. W. Beckham (Frankfort)	29
24	Ollie Murray James (Marion)	Democratic	March 4, 1913 – August 28, 1918	Elected in 1912. Died.	22	65th	22	Elected in 1914. Lost re-election.	March 4, 1915 – March 3, 1921	Democratic	J. C. W. Beckham (Frankfort)	29
Vacant			August 28, 1918 – September 7, 1918		22	65th	22	Elected in 1914. Lost re-election.	March 4, 1915 – March 3, 1921	Democratic	J. C. W. Beckham (Frankfort)	29
25	George B. Martin (Catlettsburg)	Democratic	September 7, 1918 – March 3, 1919	Appointed to finish James's term. Retired.	22	65th	22	Elected in 1914. Lost re-election.	March 4, 1915 – March 3, 1921	Democratic	J. C. W. Beckham (Frankfort)	29
26	A. O. Stanley (Henderson)	Democratic	March 4, 1919 – March 3, 1925	Elected in 1918. Didn't take seat until May 19, 1919, in order to remain Governor of Kentucky. Lost re-election.	23	66th	22	Elected in 1914. Lost re-election.	March 4, 1915 – March 3, 1921	Democratic	J. C. W. Beckham (Frankfort)	29
26	A. O. Stanley (Henderson)	Democratic	March 4, 1919 – March 3, 1925	Elected in 1918. Didn't take seat until May 19, 1919, in order to remain Governor of Kentucky. Lost re-election.	23	67th	23	Elected in 1920. Lost re-election.	March 4, 1921 – March 3, 1927	Republican	Richard P. Ernst (Covington)	30
26	A. O. Stanley (Henderson)	Democratic	March 4, 1919 – March 3, 1925	Elected in 1918. Didn't take seat until May 19, 1919, in order to remain Governor of Kentucky. Lost re-election.	23	68th	23	Elected in 1920. Lost re-election.	March 4, 1921 – March 3, 1927	Republican	Richard P. Ernst (Covington)	30
27	Fred Sackett (Louisville)	Republican	March 4, 1925 – January 9, 1930	Elected in 1924. Resigned to become U.S. Ambassador to Germany.	24	69th	23	Elected in 1920. Lost re-election.	March 4, 1921 – March 3, 1927	Republican	Richard P. Ernst (Covington)	30
27	Fred Sackett (Louisville)	Republican	March 4, 1925 – January 9, 1930	Elected in 1924. Resigned to become U.S. Ambassador to Germany.	24	70th	24	Elected in 1926.	March 4, 1927 – January 19, 1949	Democratic	Alben W. Barkley (Paducah)	31
27	Fred Sackett (Louisville)	Republican	March 4, 1925 – January 9, 1930	Elected in 1924. Resigned to become U.S. Ambassador to Germany.	24	71st	24	Elected in 1926.	March 4, 1927 – January 19, 1949	Democratic	Alben W. Barkley (Paducah)	31
Vacant			January 9, 1930 – January 11, 1930		24	71st	24	Elected in 1926.	March 4, 1927 – January 19, 1949	Democratic	Alben W. Barkley (Paducah)	31
28	John Robsion (Barbourville)	Republican	January 11, 1930 – November 30, 1930	Appointed to continue Sackett's term. Lost elections to finish Sackett's term and to next term.	24	71st	24	Elected in 1926.	March 4, 1927 – January 19, 1949	Democratic	Alben W. Barkley (Paducah)	31
29	Ben M. Williamson (Ashland)	Democratic	December 1, 1930 – March 3, 1931	Elected in 1930 to finish Sackett's term. Retired.	24	71st	24	Elected in 1926.	March 4, 1927 – January 19, 1949	Democratic	Alben W. Barkley (Paducah)	31
30	M. M. Logan (Bowling Green)	Democratic	March 4, 1931 – October 3, 1939	Elected in 1930.	25	72nd	24	Elected in 1926.	March 4, 1927 – January 19, 1949	Democratic	Alben W. Barkley (Paducah)	31
30	M. M. Logan (Bowling Green)	Democratic	March 4, 1931 – October 3, 1939	Elected in 1930.	25	73rd	25	Re-elected in 1932.	March 4, 1927 – January 19, 1949	Democratic	Alben W. Barkley (Paducah)	31
30	M. M. Logan (Bowling Green)	Democratic	March 4, 1931 – October 3, 1939	Elected in 1930.	25	74th	25	Re-elected in 1932.	March 4, 1927 – January 19, 1949	Democratic	Alben W. Barkley (Paducah)	31
30	M. M. Logan (Bowling Green)	Democratic	March 4, 1931 – October 3, 1939	Re-elected in 1936. Died.	26	75th	25	Re-elected in 1932.	March 4, 1927 – January 19, 1949	Democratic	Alben W. Barkley (Paducah)	31
30	M. M. Logan (Bowling Green)	Democratic	March 4, 1931 – October 3, 1939	Re-elected in 1936. Died.	26	76th	26	Re-elected in 1938.	March 4, 1927 – January 19, 1949	Democratic	Alben W. Barkley (Paducah)	31
Vacant			October 3, 1939 – October 10, 1939		26	76th	26	Re-elected in 1938.	March 4, 1927 – January 19, 1949	Democratic	Alben W. Barkley (Paducah)	31
31	Happy Chandler (Versailles)	Democratic	October 10, 1939 – November 1, 1945	Appointed to continue Logan's term. Elected in 1940 to finish Logan's term.	26	76th	26	Re-elected in 1938.	March 4, 1927 – January 19, 1949	Democratic	Alben W. Barkley (Paducah)	31
31	Happy Chandler (Versailles)	Democratic	October 10, 1939 – November 1, 1945	Appointed to continue Logan's term. Elected in 1940 to finish Logan's term.	26	77th	26	Re-elected in 1938.	March 4, 1927 – January 19, 1949	Democratic	Alben W. Barkley (Paducah)	31
31	Happy Chandler (Versailles)	Democratic	October 10, 1939 – November 1, 1945	Re-elected in 1942. Resigned to become Commissioner of Baseball.	27	78th	26	Re-elected in 1938.	March 4, 1927 – January 19, 1949	Democratic	Alben W. Barkley (Paducah)	31
31	Happy Chandler (Versailles)	Democratic	October 10, 1939 – November 1, 1945	Re-elected in 1942. Resigned to become Commissioner of Baseball.	27	79th	27	Re-elected in 1944. Resigned to become U.S. Vice President.	March 4, 1927 – January 19, 1949	Democratic	Alben W. Barkley (Paducah)	31
Vacant			November 1, 1945 – November 19, 1945		27	79th	27	Re-elected in 1944. Resigned to become U.S. Vice President.	March 4, 1927 – January 19, 1949	Democratic	Alben W. Barkley (Paducah)	31
32	William A. Stanfill (Hazard)	Republican	November 19, 1945 – November 5, 1946	Appointed to continue Chandler's term. Retired.	27	79th	27	Re-elected in 1944. Resigned to become U.S. Vice President.	March 4, 1927 – January 19, 1949	Democratic	Alben W. Barkley (Paducah)	31
33	John Sherman Cooper (Somerset)	Republican	November 6, 1946 – January 3, 1949	Elected to finish Chandler's term. Lost re-election.	27	79th	27	Re-elected in 1944. Resigned to become U.S. Vice President.	March 4, 1927 – January 19, 1949	Democratic	Alben W. Barkley (Paducah)	31
33	John Sherman Cooper (Somerset)	Republican	November 6, 1946 – January 3, 1949	Elected to finish Chandler's term. Lost re-election.	27	80th	27	Re-elected in 1944. Resigned to become U.S. Vice President.	March 4, 1927 – January 19, 1949	Democratic	Alben W. Barkley (Paducah)	31
34	Virgil Chapman (Paris)	Democratic	January 3, 1949 – March 8, 1951	Elected in 1948. Died.	28	81st	27	Re-elected in 1944. Resigned to become U.S. Vice President.	March 4, 1927 – January 19, 1949	Democratic	Alben W. Barkley (Paducah)	31
34	Virgil Chapman (Paris)	Democratic	January 3, 1949 – March 8, 1951	Elected in 1948. Died.	28	81st	27	Appointed to continue Barkley's term. Resigned to trigger special election.	January 20, 1949 – November 26, 1950	Democratic	Garrett Withers (Dixon)	32
34	Virgil Chapman (Paris)	Democratic	January 3, 1949 – March 8, 1951	Elected in 1948. Died.	28	81st	27	Elected to finish Barkley's term, having been elected to the next term.	November 27, 1950 – January 3, 1957	Democratic	Earle Clements (Morganfield)	33
34	Virgil Chapman (Paris)	Democratic	January 3, 1949 – March 8, 1951	Elected in 1948. Died.	28	82nd	28	Elected to full term in 1950. Lost re-election.	November 27, 1950 – January 3, 1957	Democratic	Earle Clements (Morganfield)	33
Vacant			March 8, 1951 – March 19, 1951		28	82nd	28	Elected to full term in 1950. Lost re-election.	November 27, 1950 – January 3, 1957	Democratic	Earle Clements (Morganfield)	33
35	Thomas R. Underwood (Lexington)	Democratic	March 19, 1951 – November 4, 1952	Appointed to continue Chapman's term. Lost election to finish Chapman's term.	28	82nd	28	Elected to full term in 1950. Lost re-election.	November 27, 1950 – January 3, 1957	Democratic	Earle Clements (Morganfield)	33
36	John Sherman Cooper (Somerset)	Republican	November 5, 1952 – January 3, 1955	Elected to finish Chapman's term. Lost re-election.	28	82nd	28	Elected to full term in 1950. Lost re-election.	November 27, 1950 – January 3, 1957	Democratic	Earle Clements (Morganfield)	33
36	John Sherman Cooper (Somerset)	Republican	November 5, 1952 – January 3, 1955	Elected to finish Chapman's term. Lost re-election.	28	83rd	28	Elected to full term in 1950. Lost re-election.	November 27, 1950 – January 3, 1957	Democratic	Earle Clements (Morganfield)	33
37	Alben W. Barkley (Paducah)	Democratic	January 3, 1955 – April 30, 1956	Elected in 1954. Died.	29	84th	28	Elected to full term in 1950. Lost re-election.	November 27, 1950 – January 3, 1957	Democratic	Earle Clements (Morganfield)	33
Vacant			April 30, 1956 – June 21, 1956		29	84th	28	Elected to full term in 1950. Lost re-election.	November 27, 1950 – January 3, 1957	Democratic	Earle Clements (Morganfield)	33
38	Robert Humphreys (Frankfort)	Democratic	June 21, 1956 – November 6, 1956	Appointed to continue Barkley's term. Retired when elected successor qualified.	29	84th	28	Elected to full term in 1950. Lost re-election.	November 27, 1950 – January 3, 1957	Democratic	Earle Clements (Morganfield)	33
39	John Sherman Cooper (Somerset)	Republican	November 7, 1956 – January 3, 1973	Elected to finish Barkley's term.	29	84th	28	Elected to full term in 1950. Lost re-election.	November 27, 1950 – January 3, 1957	Democratic	Earle Clements (Morganfield)	33
39	John Sherman Cooper (Somerset)	Republican	November 7, 1956 – January 3, 1973	Elected to finish Barkley's term.	29	85th	29	Elected in 1956.	January 3, 1957 – December 16, 1968	Republican	Thruston Morton (Louisville)	34
39	John Sherman Cooper (Somerset)	Republican	November 7, 1956 – January 3, 1973	Elected to finish Barkley's term.	29	86th	29	Elected in 1956.	January 3, 1957 – December 16, 1968	Republican	Thruston Morton (Louisville)	34
39	John Sherman Cooper (Somerset)	Republican	November 7, 1956 – January 3, 1973	Re-elected in 1960.	30	87th	29	Elected in 1956.	January 3, 1957 – December 16, 1968	Republican	Thruston Morton (Louisville)	34
39	John Sherman Cooper (Somerset)	Republican	November 7, 1956 – January 3, 1973	Re-elected in 1960.	30	88th	30	Re-elected in 1962. Retired, and resigned early to give successor preferential seniority.	January 3, 1957 – December 16, 1968	Republican	Thruston Morton (Louisville)	34
39	John Sherman Cooper (Somerset)	Republican	November 7, 1956 – January 3, 1973	Re-elected in 1960.	30	89th	30	Re-elected in 1962. Retired, and resigned early to give successor preferential seniority.	January 3, 1957 – December 16, 1968	Republican	Thruston Morton (Louisville)	34
39	John Sherman Cooper (Somerset)	Republican	November 7, 1956 – January 3, 1973	Re-elected in 1966. Retired.	31	90th	30	Re-elected in 1962. Retired, and resigned early to give successor preferential seniority.	January 3, 1957 – December 16, 1968	Republican	Thruston Morton (Louisville)	34
39	John Sherman Cooper (Somerset)	Republican	November 7, 1956 – January 3, 1973	Re-elected in 1966. Retired.	31	90th	30	Appointed to finish Morton's term, having already been elected to the next term.	December 17, 1968 – December 27, 1974	Republican	Marlow Cook (Louisville)	35
39	John Sherman Cooper (Somerset)	Republican	November 7, 1956 – January 3, 1973	Re-elected in 1966. Retired.	31	91st	31	Elected in 1968. Lost re-election, and resigned early to give successor preferential seniority.	December 17, 1968 – December 27, 1974	Republican	Marlow Cook (Louisville)	35
39	John Sherman Cooper (Somerset)	Republican	November 7, 1956 – January 3, 1973	Re-elected in 1966. Retired.	31	92nd	31	Elected in 1968. Lost re-election, and resigned early to give successor preferential seniority.	December 17, 1968 – December 27, 1974	Republican	Marlow Cook (Louisville)	35
40	Walter Dee Huddleston (Elizabethtown)	Democratic	January 3, 1973 – January 3, 1985	Elected in 1972.	32	93rd	31	Elected in 1968. Lost re-election, and resigned early to give successor preferential seniority.	December 17, 1968 – December 27, 1974	Republican	Marlow Cook (Louisville)	35
40	Walter Dee Huddleston (Elizabethtown)	Democratic	January 3, 1973 – January 3, 1985	Elected in 1972.	32	93rd	31	Appointed to finish Cook's term, having already been elected to the next term.	December 28, 1974 – January 3, 1999	Democratic	Wendell Ford (Owensboro)	36
40	Walter Dee Huddleston (Elizabethtown)	Democratic	January 3, 1973 – January 3, 1985	Elected in 1972.	32	94th	32	Elected in 1974.	December 28, 1974 – January 3, 1999	Democratic	Wendell Ford (Owensboro)	36
40	Walter Dee Huddleston (Elizabethtown)	Democratic	January 3, 1973 – January 3, 1985	Elected in 1972.	32	95th	32	Elected in 1974.	December 28, 1974 – January 3, 1999	Democratic	Wendell Ford (Owensboro)	36
40	Walter Dee Huddleston (Elizabethtown)	Democratic	January 3, 1973 – January 3, 1985	Re-elected in 1978. Lost re-election.	33	96th	32	Elected in 1974.	December 28, 1974 – January 3, 1999	Democratic	Wendell Ford (Owensboro)	36
40	Walter Dee Huddleston (Elizabethtown)	Democratic	January 3, 1973 – January 3, 1985	Re-elected in 1978. Lost re-election.	33	97th	33	Re-elected in 1980.	December 28, 1974 – January 3, 1999	Democratic	Wendell Ford (Owensboro)	36
40	Walter Dee Huddleston (Elizabethtown)	Democratic	January 3, 1973 – January 3, 1985	Re-elected in 1978. Lost re-election.	33	98th	33	Re-elected in 1980.	December 28, 1974 – January 3, 1999	Democratic	Wendell Ford (Owensboro)	36
41	Mitch McConnell (Louisville)	Republican	January 3, 1985 – present	Elected in 1984.	34	99th	33	Re-elected in 1980.	December 28, 1974 – January 3, 1999	Democratic	Wendell Ford (Owensboro)	36
41	Mitch McConnell (Louisville)	Republican	January 3, 1985 – present	Elected in 1984.	34	100th	34	Re-elected in 1986.	December 28, 1974 – January 3, 1999	Democratic	Wendell Ford (Owensboro)	36
41	Mitch McConnell (Louisville)	Republican	January 3, 1985 – present	Elected in 1984.	34	101st	34	Re-elected in 1986.	December 28, 1974 – January 3, 1999	Democratic	Wendell Ford (Owensboro)	36
41	Mitch McConnell (Louisville)	Republican	January 3, 1985 – present	Re-elected in 1990.	35	102nd	34	Re-elected in 1986.	December 28, 1974 – January 3, 1999	Democratic	Wendell Ford (Owensboro)	36
41	Mitch McConnell (Louisville)	Republican	January 3, 1985 – present	Re-elected in 1990.	35	103rd	35	Re-elected in 1992. Retired.	December 28, 1974 – January 3, 1999	Democratic	Wendell Ford (Owensboro)	36
41	Mitch McConnell (Louisville)	Republican	January 3, 1985 – present	Re-elected in 1990.	35	104th	35	Re-elected in 1992. Retired.	December 28, 1974 – January 3, 1999	Democratic	Wendell Ford (Owensboro)	36
41	Mitch McConnell (Louisville)	Republican	January 3, 1985 – present	Re-elected in 1996.	36	105th	35	Re-elected in 1992. Retired.	December 28, 1974 – January 3, 1999	Democratic	Wendell Ford (Owensboro)	36
41	Mitch McConnell (Louisville)	Republican	January 3, 1985 – present	Re-elected in 1996.	36	106th	36	Elected in 1998.	January 3, 1999 – January 3, 2011	Republican	Jim Bunning (Southgate)	37
41	Mitch McConnell (Louisville)	Republican	January 3, 1985 – present	Re-elected in 1996.	36	107th	36	Elected in 1998.	January 3, 1999 – January 3, 2011	Republican	Jim Bunning (Southgate)	37
41	Mitch McConnell (Louisville)	Republican	January 3, 1985 – present	Re-elected in 2002.	37	108th	36	Elected in 1998.	January 3, 1999 – January 3, 2011	Republican	Jim Bunning (Southgate)	37
41	Mitch McConnell (Louisville)	Republican	January 3, 1985 – present	Re-elected in 2002.	37	109th	37	Re-elected in 2004. Retired.	January 3, 1999 – January 3, 2011	Republican	Jim Bunning (Southgate)	37
41	Mitch McConnell (Louisville)	Republican	January 3, 1985 – present	Re-elected in 2002.	37	110th	37	Re-elected in 2004. Retired.	January 3, 1999 – January 3, 2011	Republican	Jim Bunning (Southgate)	37
41	Mitch McConnell (Louisville)	Republican	January 3, 1985 – present	Re-elected in 2008.	38	111th	37	Re-elected in 2004. Retired.	January 3, 1999 – January 3, 2011	Republican	Jim Bunning (Southgate)	37
41	Mitch McConnell (Louisville)	Republican	January 3, 1985 – present	Re-elected in 2008.	38	112th	38	Elected in 2010.	January 3, 2011 – present	Republican	Rand Paul (Bowling Green)	38
41	Mitch McConnell (Louisville)	Republican	January 3, 1985 – present	Re-elected in 2008.	38	113th	38	Elected in 2010.	January 3, 2011 – present	Republican	Rand Paul (Bowling Green)	38
41	Mitch McConnell (Louisville)	Republican	January 3, 1985 – present	Re-elected in 2014.	39	114th	38	Elected in 2010.	January 3, 2011 – present	Republican	Rand Paul (Bowling Green)	38
41	Mitch McConnell (Louisville)	Republican	January 3, 1985 – present	Re-elected in 2014.	39	115th	39	Re-elected in 2016.	January 3, 2011 – present	Republican	Rand Paul (Bowling Green)	38
41	Mitch McConnell (Louisville)	Republican	January 3, 1985 – present	Re-elected in 2014.	39	116th	39	Re-elected in 2016.	January 3, 2011 – present	Republican	Rand Paul (Bowling Green)	38
41	Mitch McConnell (Louisville)	Republican	January 3, 1985 – present	Re-elected in 2020. Retiring at the end of term.	40	117th	39	Re-elected in 2016.	January 3, 2011 – present	Republican	Rand Paul (Bowling Green)	38
41	Mitch McConnell (Louisville)	Republican	January 3, 1985 – present	Re-elected in 2020. Retiring at the end of term.	40	118th	40	Re-elected in 2022.	January 3, 2011 – present	Republican	Rand Paul (Bowling Green)	38
41	Mitch McConnell (Louisville)	Republican	January 3, 1985 – present	Re-elected in 2020. Retiring at the end of term.	40	119th	40	Re-elected in 2022.	January 3, 2011 – present	Republican	Rand Paul (Bowling Green)	38
42	Andy Barr (elect) (Lexington)	Republican	Taking office Jan 3, 2027	Elected in 2026.	41	120th	40	Re-elected in 2022.	January 3, 2011 – present	Republican	Rand Paul (Bowling Green)	38
42	Andy Barr (elect) (Lexington)	Republican	Taking office Jan 3, 2027	Elected in 2026.	41	121st	41	To be determined in the 2028 election.				

== See also ==
- Elections in Kentucky
- Kentucky's congressional delegations
- List of United States representatives from Kentucky
