= 1936 United States Senate election in Kentucky =

- November 3, 1936
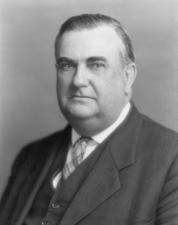

Nominee	M. M. Logan	Robert H. Lucas
Party	Democratic	Republican
Popular vote	539,968	365,850
Percentage	58.80%	39.84%
- County results Logan: 50–60% 60–70% 70–80% 80–90% Lucas: 50–60% 60–70% 70–80% 80–90%
U.S. senator before election
M. M. Logan
Democratic
Elected U.S. Senator
M. M. Logan
Democratic

The 1936 United States Senate election in Kentucky took place on November 3, 1936. Incumbent Democratic Senator M. M. Logan was re-elected to a second term in office over Republican Robert H. Lucas.

== Primary elections ==
=== Democratic primary ===
==== Candidates ====
- J. C. W. Beckham, former U.S. Senator
- John Y. Brown, Sr., former U.S. Congressmember
- M. M. Logan, incumbent U.S. Senator
- K. N. Salyer
- Montgomery Walker

==== Results ====
Primary results by county Logan: 30%–40%; 40%–50%; 50%–60%; 60%–70%; 80%–90%; Beckham: 30%–40%; 40%–50%; 50%–60%; 60%–70%; 70%–80%; Brown: 30%–40%; 40%–50%

Democratic primary results
Party	Candidate	Votes	%
Democratic	M. M. Logan (incumbent)	181,311	39.94
Democratic	J. C. W. Beckham	178,926	39.41
Democratic	John Y. Brown, Sr.	85,221	18.77
Democratic	K. N. Salyer	5,231	1.15
Democratic	Montgomery Walker	3,284	0.72
Total votes		453,973	100.00

=== Republican primary ===
==== Candidates ====
- Roscoe Conklin Douglas
- G. Tom Hawkins
- Robert H. Lucas
- Elmer C. Roberts
- Helen May Young

==== Results ====
Primary results by county Lucas: 40%-50%; 50%-60%; 60%-70%; 70%-80%; 80%-90%; 90%-100%; Roberts: 40%-50%; 50%-60%; Other: 40%-50%; 50%-60%

Republican primary results
Party	Candidate	Votes	%
Republican	Robert H. Lucas	120,844	63.76
Republican	Elmer C. Roberts	26,935	14.21
Republican	Helen May Young	16,059	8.47
Republican	Roscoe Conklin Douglas	14,342	7.57
Republican	G. Tom Hawkins	11,360	5.99
Total votes		189,540	100.00

== General election ==
=== Candidates ===
- M. M. Logan, incumbent Senator since 1931 (Democratic)
- William M. Likins (Union)
- Robert H. Lucas (Republican)
- W. E. Sandefer (Socialist)
- Ferdinand Zimmerer (Socialist Labor)

=== Results ===
1936 U.S. Senate election in Kentucky
Party	Candidate	Votes	%	±%
Democratic	M. M. Logan (incumbent)	539,968	58.80%	
Republican	Robert H. Lucas	365,850	39.84%	
Union	William M. Likins	11,709	1.28%	
Socialist	W. E. Sandefer	541	0.06%	
Socialist Labor	Ferdinand Zimmerer	271	0.03%	
Total votes		918,339	100.00%	
Democratic hold		Swing		

== See also ==
- 1936 United States Senate elections
