= Legislative Research Commission =

Agency overview
- Formed: July 1, 1949
- Jurisdiction: Kentucky General Assembly
- Employees: 380
- Agency executives: Katie C. Comstock, Director; Robert Stivers, Co-chair; David Osborne, Co-chair
- Website: https://legislature.ky.gov/LRC/Pages/default.aspx

The Legislative Research Commission (LRC) is an agency of Kentucky state government that supports the state legislature, the Kentucky General Assembly.

== Duties ==
Per the Kentucky Constitution, the General Assembly may only meet for 60 days in even numbered years and for 30 days in odd numbered years. As such, the LRC oversees all meetings of interim, statutory, and special committees which meet during the legislative interim. The LRC also provides the General Assembly with staff and research support including committee staffing, bill drafting, oversight of the state budget and educational reform, production of educational materials, maintenance of a reference library and Internet site, and the preparation and printing of research reports, informational bulletins and a legislative newspaper.

== Composition ==
The LRC is composed of 16 legislators, drawn from the leadership of the Kentucky House of Representatives and the Kentucky Senate. The President of the Kentucky Senate and the Speaker of the Kentucky House of Representatives serve as co-chairs. The agency is run on a day-to-day basis by a director, and staffed by nearly 400 full-time employees. During each regular session, the number of staff members temporarily increases to nearly 600.

The current director is Katie C. Comstock, who assumed the office on August 1, 2026. Prior to becoming director, she was a longtime LRC senior staff member and former head of the Kentucky Administrative Office of the Courts.

== History ==
=== Creation ===
In 1922, Governor Edwin P. Morrow proposed the creation of an efficiency commission in order to study the branches of state government and make recommendations to increase their efficiency. This commission reported its findings and recommendations to Morrow as well as the General Assembly in January 1924, among them being the creation of a legislative reference bureau. Afterwards, an "extra help" joint resolution was adopted by both chambers to employ an unspecified number of employees for each chamber, with the House being allocated $7,000 and the Senate allocated $6,000. However, this measure was struck down by the Kentucky Court of Appeals as unconstitutional. Justice Richard Priest Dietzman writing for the court's majority lamented how overburdened the legislature had become, but emphasized that the text of the state constitution did not permit the expansion of direct legislative employees beyond those outlined such as the sergeant-at-arms, clerks, etc.

In 1936, The Legislative Council was created by the Government Reorganization Act to assist in bill drafting and legislative research. Considered the precursor to the modern LRC, the council was composed of five senators appointed by the lieutenant governor (who served as chair), five representatives appointed by the speaker of the house (who served as vice chair), five administrative officials appointed by the governor, and the governor themself. However, it was provided little direction, was allocated no funds, and provided little material aid to lawmakers. It was managed by a part-time director as well as eight full-time staff members until 1944, after which it employed no staff. The same year, Speaker Harry Lee Waterfield proposed an expansion of the council's duties to include meetings during the legislative interims as well as a return of professional full-time staffers and $100,000 in funds.

During the 1948 Kentucky General Assembly, Majority Floor Leader John C. Watts sponsored House Bill 64, an act which officially created the Legislative Research Commission. On February 27, it was signed into law by Governor Earle Clements.

=== Commission evolution ===
During the first two decades of the LRC, it remained a very weak staff agency due to the unbalanced influence of the governor over the General Assembly and the commission itself. Initially, the commission was composed of seven members with the governor serving as chairman alongside both majority and minority leadership of both chambers of the General Assembly. Arthur Y. Lloyd, commissioner of the Kentucky Department of Welfare, was appointed by Clements to serve as the LRC's first director.

Following the election of Governor Louie Nunn in 1967, there was a push by legislative leaders to modernize the LRC and assert legislative independence from the executive branch. This resulted in the professionalization of staff, a reduction in the number of legislative committees, and the creation of the current interim joint committee system.

In 1977, Vic Hellard Jr. became the first LRC director to be appointed by the General Assembly and not the governor. Hellard was the longest-serving LRC director in the commission's history, and is credited with transforming the commission into its current form.

Directors of the Legislative Research Commission
No	Name	Term
1	Arthur Y. Lloyd	1948–1956
2	Harry Lee Waterfield	1956–1959
3	Wilson W. Wyatt	1959–1960
4	Charles Wheeler	1960–1964
5	James T. Fleming	1964–1972
6	Jackson W. White	1972–1974
7	Phillip W. Conn	1974–1977
8	Vic Hellard Jr.	1977–1995
9	Don Cetrulo	1995–1999
10	Bobby Sherman	1999–2013
acting	Marcia Seiler	2013–2015
11	David Byerman	2015–2018
acting	Becky Harilson and David Floyd	2018–2019
12	Jay Hartz	2019–2026t
13	Katie C. Comstock	2026–present
