= Richard Priest Dietzman =

American judge (1883–1943)

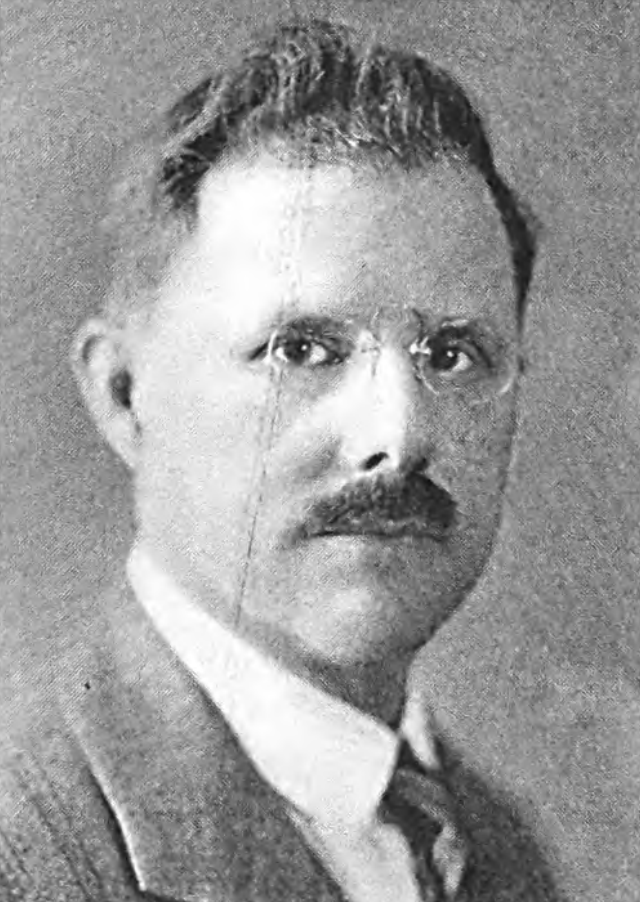
- Dietzman, c. 1929

Chief Justice of the Kentucky Court of Appeals
- In office September 21, 1931 – April 10, 1933
- Preceded by: Gus Thomas
- Succeeded by: William H. Rees

Justice of the Kentucky Court of Appeals
- In office November 18, 1924 – January 7, 1935
- Preceded by: Joseph T. O'Neal
- Succeeded by: James W. Stites

City Attorney of Louisville
- In office July 8, 1924 – November 15, 1924
- Preceded by: David William Fairleigh
- Succeeded by: W. T. Baskett

Personal details
- Born: August 13, 1883 Louisville, Kentucky
- Died: December 22, 1943 (aged 60)
- Resting place: Cave Hill Cemetery; Louisville, Kentucky
- Party: Republican
- Other political affiliations: Progressive (1912)
- Education: Harvard University (AB, LLB)

Military service
- Allegiance: United States
- Branch/service: United States Army
- Years of service: 1918
- Unit: 50th Training Battery (Field Artillery Central Officer's Training School, Camp Zachary Taylor)
- Commands: World War I

Richard Priest Dietzman (August 13, 1883 – December 22, 1943) was an American attorney and jurist from Kentucky who served as a member of the Kentucky Court of Appeals from 1924 to 1935, and as chief justice of the court from 1931 to 1933.

Born and raised in Louisville, Dietzman excelled academically, receiving both his undergraduate and law degrees from Harvard University. After returning to Kentucky, he became a law partner of future governor Augustus E. Willson. A member of the Republican Party, he first rose to political prominence during the 1912 presidential election as a supporter of former president Theodore Roosevelt, becoming an early leader of the Progressive Party in Jefferson County. After joining the administration of Louisville mayor Huston Quin during the early 1920s, Dietzman quickly rose through city's municipal law department until he was appointed city attorney in 1924. During this time, he drafted the state's first law against driving under the influence. Later that year, he was elected to the Kentucky Court of Appeals. He was reelected in 1926, and assumed the role of chief justice in 1931. However, he was defeated for reelection in 1934, marking the first time in nearly twenty years that the court had no Republican members. He was also the last Republican member to serve as chief justice until 1960.

After his defeat, Dietzman returned to private practice in Louisville. He remained civically involved, serving as president of the city's Masonic Widows and Orphans Home board of directors, chairman of the Federal Home Loan Bank of Cincinnati's board of directors, and being called on by Governor Keen Johnson to lead an investigative committee on corruption. In 1943, he suffered a stroke and died shortly thereafter. He is interred at Cave Hill Cemetery.

In 1963, Governor Bert Combs cited Dietzman's electoral defeat as a prominent example of the state's need for nonpartisan judicial elections, which would eventually become law in 1976.

== Early life and education ==
Richard Priest Dietzman was born in Louisville, Kentucky, on August 13, 1883, to Albert and Nellie Priest (Chamberlain) Dietzman. His father was a newspaperman who served in managerial roles at various newspapers in the city, including the Louisville Commercial and Louisville Dispatch. Alongside a partner, he acquired the Louisville Critic in 1898, which they operated as a Republican newspaper.

Dietzman attended Louisville Male High School, where he excelled academically, being elected president of the Athenaeum Literary Society, and graduating valedictorian in 1901. Afterwards, he enrolled at Harvard University.

At Harvard, he received the John Harvard Scholarship, the detur book prize, and was a founder and the first president of the Kentucky Club of Harvard University. In 1905, he graduated magna cum laude and Phi Beta Kappa with an Artium Baccalaureus degree. Following graduation, he remained at Harvard Law School where he was an editor of the Harvard Law Review. He graduated cum laude with a Bachelor of Laws degree in 1907, and afterwards returned to Kentucky.

== Early career ==
After being admitted to the Kentucky bar in 1907, Dietzman joined the law practice of Augustus E. Willson, who was then the Republican nominee for governor. After Willson was elected governor, Dietzman was a member of the train party which accompanied Willson to Frankfort. He continued to practice law with Willson until at least 1920, including during his tenure as governor.

In August 1918, Dietzman enlisted in the United States Army for service in World War I. He was assigned to enter the Field Artillery Central Officer's Training School (F.A.C.O.T.S.) at Camp Zachary Taylor in Louisville, which at the time was the largest army training camp in North America. However, due to the 1918 Spanish flue pandemic, his entry was delayed until late October. He spent his early training with the 9th Observation Battery before joining the 50th Training Battery. However, due to the armistice being signed on November 11, he chose to accept a discharge in early December.

In addition to practicing law alongside Willson, Dietzman joined the faculty of the Jefferson School of Law, a part-time night law school founded in 1905. By 1920, he was the school's chair of pleading and practice.

=== Early political involvement ===
Dietzman's political activities first became pronounced with his support for former president Theadore Roosevelt in the 1912 United States presidential election. During that year's city and county Republican Party convention, held at the Galt House in Louisville, the national split between supporters of Roosevelt and supporters of incumbent president William Howard Taft came to a boil as many Roosevelt committeemen of both the city and county parties were not permitted to be seated, and asked to leave the meeting. The Roosevelt supporters contested this, and after the Taft majority adjourned, chose to hold their own meeting where they heard testimony regarding alleged fraud committed by Taft supporters.

Dietzman was one of those who were called on to provide testimony, during which he alleged that Taft supporters prevented Roosevelt supporters in Jefferson County from receiving their credentials to serve as election officers, instead giving them to Taft men. He also allegedly witnessed two Taft supporters stuffing a ballot box with about fifty Taft ballots.

In August, the Progressive Party of Jefferson County was formed, and Dietzman was elected its president.

However, while the party ran candidates for Kentucky's 5th congressional district, circuit judge, police court bailiff, and city council, all were defeated, and Roosevelt placed second in the county behind Democratic nominee Woodrow Wilson.

=== Municipal service ===
In October 1922, Louisville mayor Huston Quin appointed Dietzman as mayoral counsel, a position which had not been filled since Quin assumed office the year prior. He remained in this role until February 1923, when he was appointed first assistant city attorney as part of a departmental reshuffling due to the election of city attorney Maurice Thatcher to Congress. During his tenure, he was tasked by the city's police chief and board of public safety with drafting the state's first law against driving under the influence. The law, which mandatorily revoked a convicted driver's license for a year, was passed by the 1924 Kentucky General Assembly, and signed into law by Governor William J. Fields.

Following the death of city attorney David William Fairleigh, Dietzman was appointed to the position in July 1924, serving as such until his election to the Kentucky Court of Appeals that November.

== Kentucky Court of Appeals ==
=== Election ===
Kentucky's 4th Court of Appeals district, which consists of only Jefferson County, changed hands rapidly from 1921 to 1924. Huston Quin was elected to the seat in 1918, but resigned after being elected mayor of Louisville in 1921. Governor Edwin P. Morrow appointed Charles Harwood Moorman to the seat, but he resigned after being appointed U.S. district judge of the Western District of Kentucky in 1924. Henry W. Robinson was elected to the seat in a special election, but he soon thereafter died of an illness. Governor Fields then appointed Joseph T. O'Neal to the seat, who chose not be a candidate in the subsequent special election held that November.

Dietzman announced his intent to seek the Republican nomination for the seat prior to his appointment as city attorney. He received the nomination, and campaigned alongside congressman Maurice Thatcher in support of the Republican ticket headed by President Calvin Coolidge. Dietzman won the November election with 59,936 votes (54.5%) against Democratic nominee David R. Castleman. He resigned as city attorney on November 15, and assumed office three days later. He was renominated without opposition for a full term in 1926, and won the general election with 50,054 votes (53.5%) against Democratic nominee James P. Gregory.

=== Tenure ===
Just over ten days after assuming office, Dietzman published his first opinion as a member of the court. In span of one month, he wrote sixteen opinions. Later in his tenure, he drafted one of the shortest opinions the court ever issued, consisting of just sixty words due to one party failing to file a brief.

In 1926, he wrote the court's majority opinion striking down an early version of the Legislative Research Commission. The General Assembly had passed an "extra help" joint resolution in 1924, which allocated funds for both chambers to hire additional employees. In his opinion, Dietzmen lamented how overburdened the legislature had become, but emphasized that they were not permit to expand the number of direct legislative employees beyond those outlined in the text of the state's constitution. In a speech to students at the University of Kentucky College of Law given shortly thereafter, he advocated for the passage of a new constitution.

A notable case which generated both controversy and praise around Dietzman concerned the 1925 Louisville and Jefferson County local elections, where it was alleged that a Republican conspiracy had engaged in ballot stuffing. Dietzman, who himself was discussed as a potential candidate for mayor that year but declined, chose not to recuse himself from the case when it reached the court in 1927. This decision drew backlash due to his relation by marriage to one of the candidates as well as the fact that his brother served as chief deputy jailer, a position appointed by the elected county jailer. However, when the court ruled 5–1 to overturn the election, with Dietzman joining the Democratic majority, he was praised for his "highly courageous" action. In writing about the decision, the Louisville Courier-Journal stated that "Judge Dietzman shows that he is an upright, fearless jurist before he is a Republican. It is of such as Dietzman that our courts must ever be constituted if they are to remain the bulwarks of our institutions."

For the summer of 1930, he joined the faculty of Northwestern University School of Law.

==== Chief Justice ====
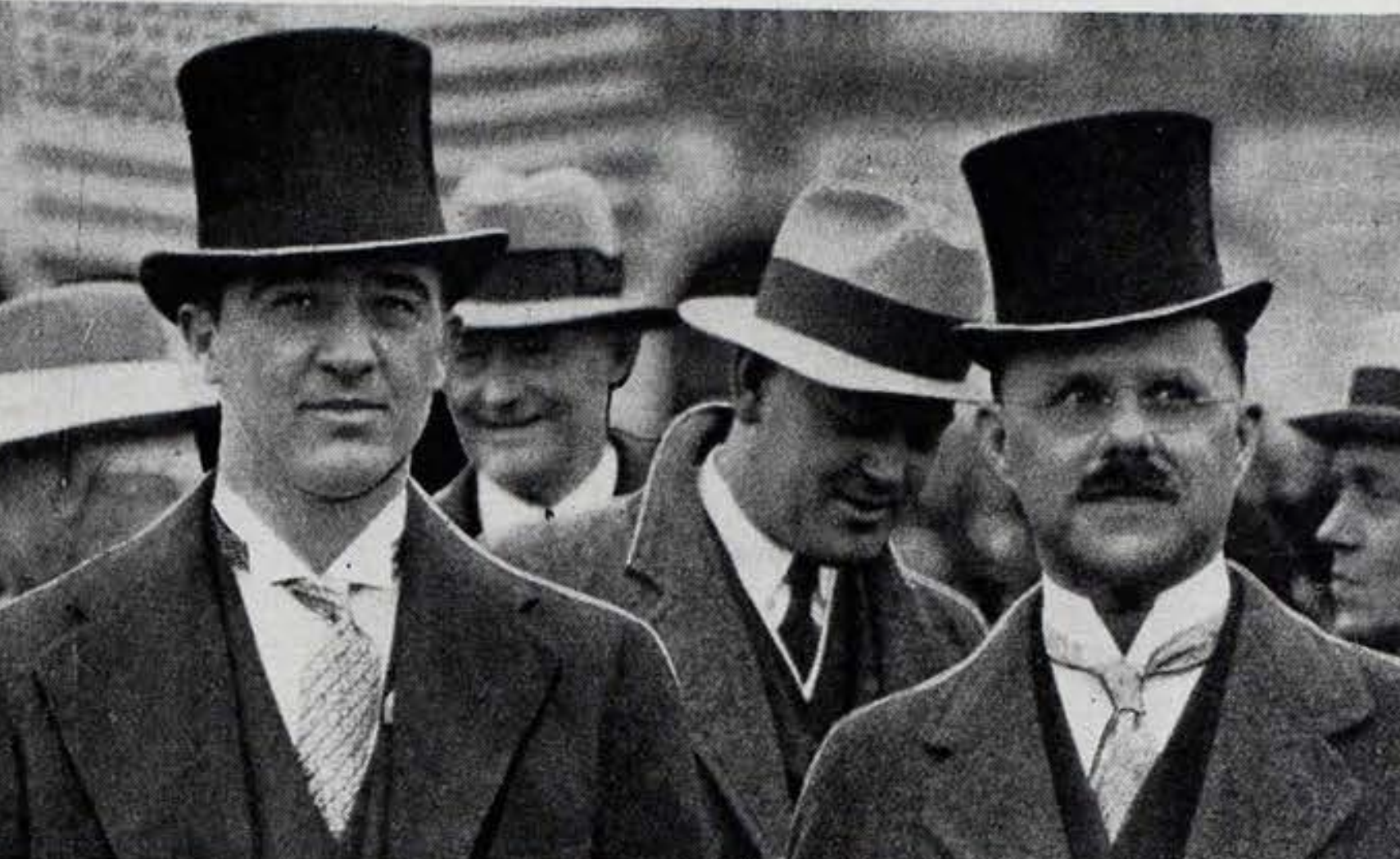
As chief justice, Dietzman (R) swore in Governor Ruby Laffoon and Lt. Governor Happy Chandler (L) in December 1931.

On September 21, 1931, Dietzman was elevated to chief justice of the court. During his time leading the court, he continued his advocacy for the adoption of a new state constitution, citing the lack of regulatory safeguards around the accrual of the state's debt, and the need to ensure that "people will not be crushed by a burden of taxation to pay for things which cannot be afforded." The state also adopted his compilation of civil and criminal practice as the state's official code of practice.

He remained as chief justice until he yielded the position to justice William H. Rees at the opening of the court's spring term on April 10, 1933. He was the last Republican to serve as chief justice until justice Robert B. Bird was elevated to the position in 1960.

=== Electoral defeat ===
In 1934, Dietzman was challenged for reelection by Democratic nominee James W. Stites. The campaign was described as "gentlemanly," with both sides often trading compliments towards each other. However, despite bipartisan support and Dietzman outrunning the Republican ticket by nearly 8,000 votes, he was defeated by a margin of about 4,000 votes. When he left office on January 7, 1935, it marked the first time since 1912 that all seven members of the court were Democrats.

== Later life and career ==
After leaving the court, Dietzman returned to the practice of law, making his office in the Kentucky Home Life Building. He came to be regarded as the dean of the Kentucky Bar Association.

Despite being discussed as a potential candidate for governor in 1935, he never ran for another public office.

In 1941, following allegations of corruption made by attorney general Hubert Meredith against Governor Keen Johnson, Johnson appointed Dietzman to lead an investigative committee into his administration's division of purchases. The committee found evidence of inefficiency, negligence, and favoritism in the division, and gave a number of recommendations to address these issues. Johnson asked Dietzman to draft a bill to implement these recommendations.

== Personal life ==
On November 13, 1935, Dietzman married Esther Elizabeth Sesmer, the daughter of a prominent Louisville physician who immigrated to the city from Russia. Together, they had two daughters, Elizabeth and Anne.

Dietzman was active in many civil, fraternal, and social organizations throughout his life. He was a member of the Episcopal Church, Filson Historical Society, Kentucky Historical Society, and Order of the Elks. He served as chairman of the Federal Home Loan Bank of Cincinnati's board of directors, trustee and general counsel of Kings Daughters' Home for Incurables, and president of the Louisville Masonic Widows and Orphans Home board of directors.

He also held several leadership roles in freemasonry, including grand master of his local lodge and Scottish rite, high priest of King Solomon Chapter 5 R.A.M., and thrice illustrious master of Louisville Council 4 R.&S.M. Notably, he served as grand master of the grand council of Kentucky R&SM from 1923 to 1924, grand master of the grand lodge of Kentucky from 1933 to 1934, and later as grand commander of the Grand Commandery of the Kentucky Knights Templar.

== Death and legacy ==
On December 20, 1943, Dietzman suffered a stroke while at his law office. After being found by employees at his desk, he was transported to Saint Anthony's Hospital, where he died two days later from pneumonia. His funeral was held on Christmas Eve, and he was interred at Cave Hill Cemetery.

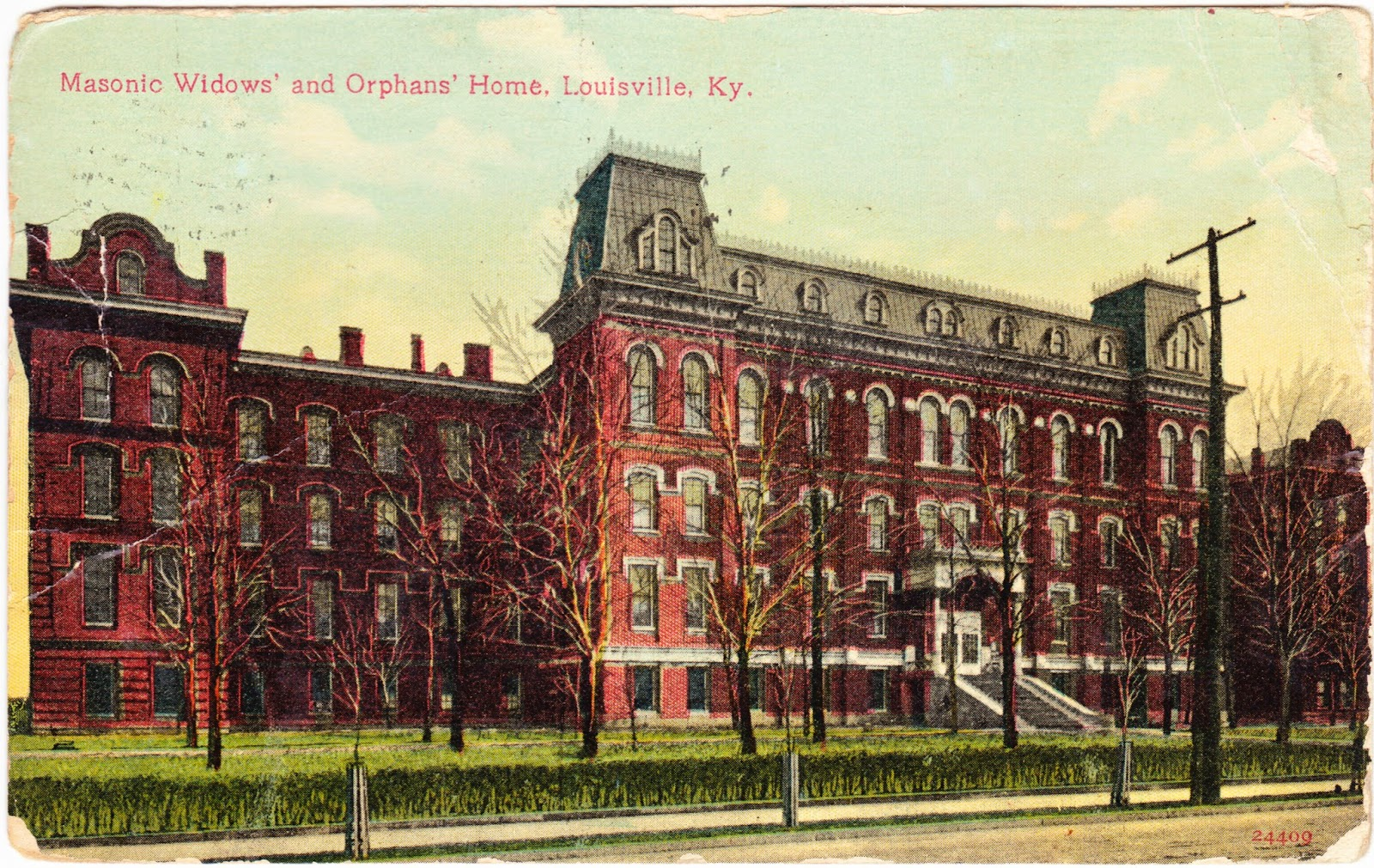
Dietzman served as president of the Louisville Masonic Widows and Orphans Home board of directors. After his death, the home's library was rededicated in his honor.

After his death, a list of books he intended to donate to the Louisville Masonic Widows and Orphans Home was found on his desk. After the note was discovered, cash gifts and book donations swelled the library to contain 6,000 volumes. In March 1944, the library was rededicated as the "Richard Priest Dietzman Memorial Library."

In a letter to the Courier-Journal following his defeat in 1934, dean emeritus Alvin E. Evans of the University of Kentucky College of Law wrote about Dietzman's place in the state's judicial history: "Judge Dietzman's opinions and his reasoning powers rank favorably with any judge who ever sat on the bench of the highest court in Kentucky ... [h]e performed a conspicuous service upon the bench. No problem or point of view found him cold. He is a sound, liberal, industrious and brilliant lawyer."

A portrait of Dietzman was presented to the Kentucky Court of Appeals by his wife in 1945.

In November 1963, Governor Bert Combs called the General Assembly into a special session in-part to address issues which had become prevalent concerning Kentucky's judicial branch. Among them, Combs called for judiciary elections to be made nonpartisan, citing the electoral defeats of Dietzman and Simeon Willis as depriving the state of "two of our ablest appellate judges" due to "a shift in party strength –– a shift which ha[d] no relation to their individual capacities as judges." While not enacted during that special session, nonpartisan judicial elections later became law as part of the judicial reform article of 1976.

== Publications ==
=== Articles ===
- Dietzman, Richard Priest, "The Practice Act of 1930." Kentucky Law Journal 22, no. 1 (1933): 92–98.
- Dietzman, Richard Priest, "Constitutional Limitations on Public Indebtedness." Kentucky Law Journal 20, no. 1 (1931): 75–92.
- Dietzman, Richard Priest, "The Kentucky Law Reports and Reporters." Kentucky Law Journal 16, no. 1 (1927): 16–27.
- Dietzman, Richard Priest, "The Four Constitutions of Kentucky." Kentucky Law Journal 15, no. 2 (1927): 116–127.

=== Book reviews ===
- Dietzman, Richard Priest, “The Critical Court Struggle in Kentucky, by Arndt M. Stickles.” Kentucky Law Journal 18, no. 2 (1930): 199–200.

=== Books ===
- Carroll, John D., and Richard Priest Dietzman. Carroll’s Kentucky Statutes Annotated. 8th ed. Edited by William Edward Baldwin. Banks-Baldwin Publishing Company, 1933.
