= John M. Robsion =

American politician (1873–1948)

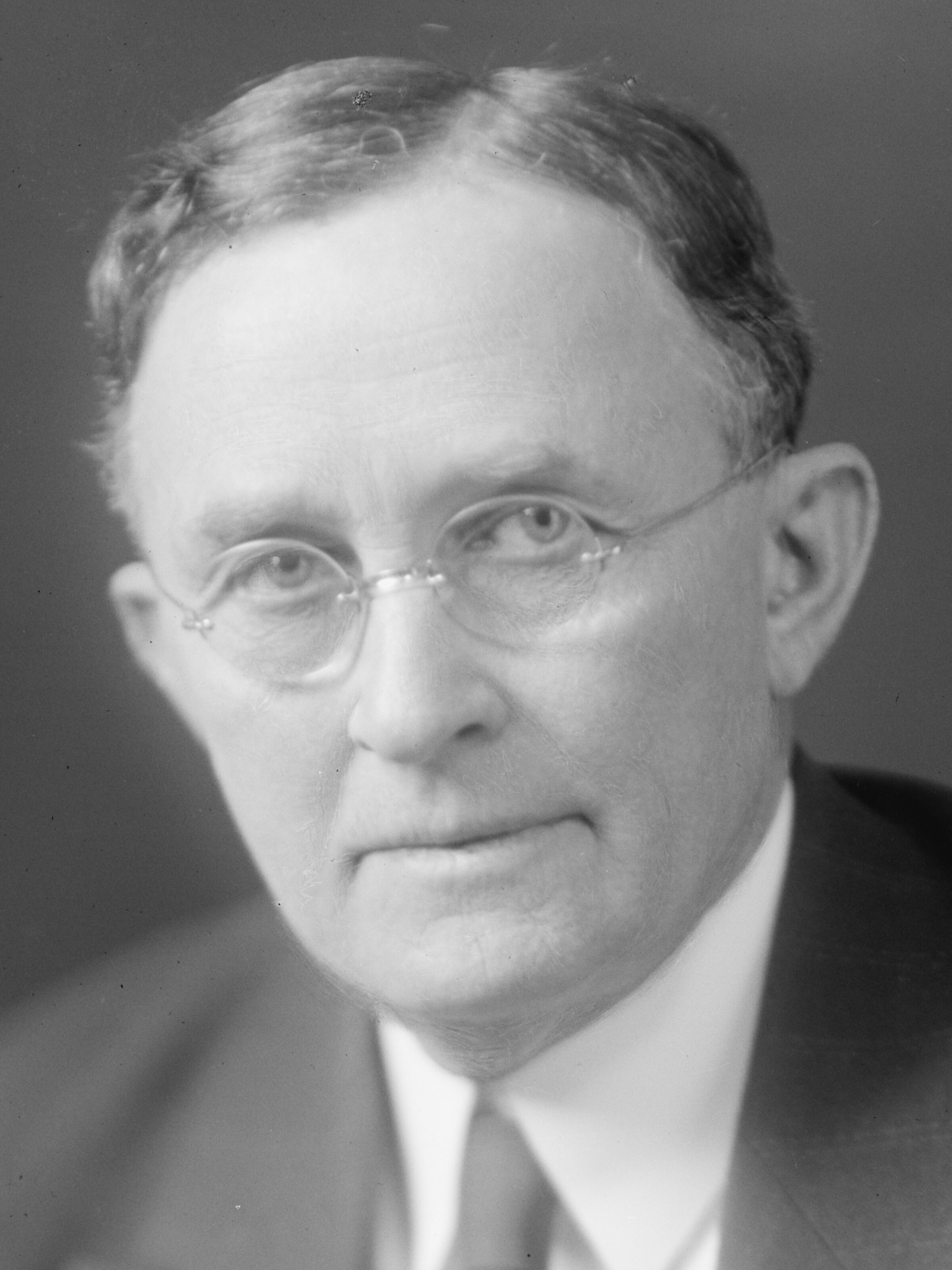

United States Senator from Kentucky
- In office January 11, 1930 – November 30, 1930
- Appointed by: Flem D. Sampson
- Preceded by: Frederic M. Sackett
- Succeeded by: Ben M. Williamson

Member of the U.S. House of Representatives from Kentucky
- In office January 3, 1935 – February 17, 1948
- Preceded by: Fred M. Vinson
- Succeeded by: William Lewis
- Constituency: 9th district
- In office March 4, 1919 – January 10, 1930
- Preceded by: Caleb Powers
- Succeeded by: Charles Finley
- Constituency: 11th district

Personal details
- Born: John Marshall Robsion; January 2, 1873 Berlin, Kentucky
- Died: February 17, 1948 (aged 75) Barbourville, Kentucky
- Resting place: Barbourville Cemetery, Barbourville, Kentucky; 36°51′20.3″N 83°52′27″W
- Party: Republican
- Children: John M. Robsion Jr.

John Marshall Robsion (January 2, 1873 – February 17, 1948) was an American politician who represented Kentucky in both the United States Senate and the United States House of Representatives as a member of the Republican Party.

Born in Berlin, Kentucky, Robsion attended National Northern University, now Ohio Northern University, in Ada, Ohio, and Holbrook College in Knoxville, Tennessee. He graduated from the National Normal University in Lebanon, Ohio. He then earned a law degree from Centre College in Danville, Kentucky, in 1900.

Robsion taught in public schools for several years and at Union College in Barbourville, Kentucky. He also practiced law in Barbourville and was president of the First National Bank of Barbourville.

Robsion was elected to the United States House of Representatives, serving in the Sixty-sixth and the five succeeding Congresses, from March 4, 1919, until January 10, 1930, when he resigned to serve in the United States Senate. He served as chairman of the Committee on Mines and Mining (Sixty-eighth through Seventy-first Congresses).

He was appointed on January 9, 1930, to the Senate to fill the vacancy caused by the resignation of Frederic M. Sackett and served from January 11 to November 30, 1930. He was unsuccessful in his bid for a full term in the same seat in the 1930 general election. After leaving the Senate, Robsion resumed the practice of law and was again elected to the House of Representatives, serving in the Seventy-fourth and the six succeeding Congresses, from January 3, 1935, until his death in Barbourville, Kentucky, February 17, 1948. He is buried in Barbourville Cemetery.

== See also ==
- List of members of the United States Congress who died in office (1900–1949)

Party political offices
Preceded by Frederic M. Sackett	Republican nominee for U.S. senator from Kentucky (Class 2); 1930	Succeeded by Robert M. Lucas
U.S. House of Representatives
Preceded by Caleb Powers	United States Representative, Kentucky's 11th district March 4, 1919–January 10, 1930 (obsolete district)	Succeeded by Charles Finley
Preceded by Fred M. Vinson	United States Representative, Kentucky's 9th district January 3, 1935–February 17, 1948 (obsolete district)	Succeeded by William Lewis
U.S. Senate
Preceded by Frederic M. Sackett	United States Senator (Class 2) from Kentucky; January 11, 1930–November 30, 1930	Succeeded by Ben M. Williamson
