= Frederic M. Sackett =

American diplomat and politician (1868–1941)

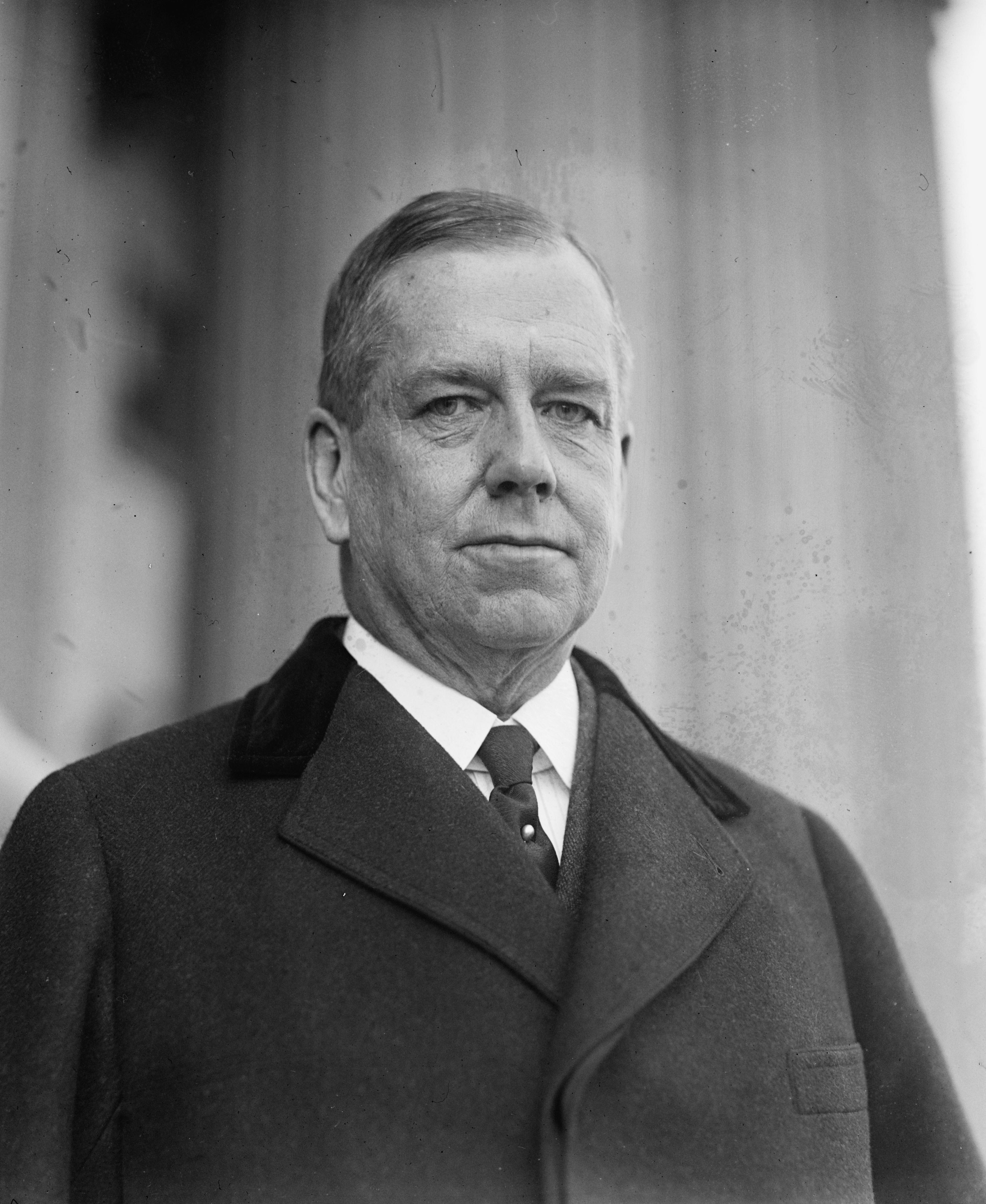
- Sackett in 1924

United States Senator from Kentucky
- In office March 4, 1925 – January 9, 1930
- Preceded by: Augustus O. Stanley
- Succeeded by: John M. Robsion

United States Ambassador to Germany
- In office February 12, 1930 – March 24, 1933
- President: Herbert Hoover; Franklin D. Roosevelt
- Preceded by: Jacob Gould Schurman
- Succeeded by: William E. Dodd

Personal details
- Born: Frederic Mosley Sackett; December 17, 1868 Providence, Rhode Island
- Died: May 18, 1941 (aged 72) Baltimore, Maryland
- Party: Republican

Frederic Mosley Sackett (December 17, 1868 – May 18, 1941) served as a United States senator from Kentucky and ambassador to Germany during the Hoover administration.

== Early life ==
He was born in Providence, Rhode Island. His father, also named Frederic Moseley, was a Civil War veteran and wealthy wools manufacturer.

He attended the public schools in Providence. He graduated from Brown University in 1890 and Harvard Law School in 1893.

== Legal career ==
He was admitted to the bar in 1893 and began practice in Columbus, Ohio. Shortly after he moved to Cincinnati, Ohio and then to Louisville, Kentucky. He practiced law until 1907.

In 1898 he married Olive Speed, the daughter of James Breckenridge Speed, who was part of a wealthy and prominent Kentucky family.

Although he began as an attorney, he gradually became involved in his wife's family business, the mining of coal and the manufacture of cement. He served as president of the Louisville Gas Co. and of the Louisville Lighting Co. from 1907 to 1912. He was involved with the Board of Trade of Louisville, serving as president in 1917, 1922, and 1923. He was also director of the Louisville Branch of the Federal Reserve Bank from 1917 to 1924. During the First World War, he served as federal food administrator for Kentucky from 1917 to 1919. This led to a friendship with the directory of the national food administrator, Herbert Hoover. Afterwards he was a member of the Kentucky State Board of Charities and Corrections from 1919 to 1924.

== Senator ==
He was elected as a Republican to the United States Senate in 1924 and served from March 4, 1925, to January 9, 1930, when he resigned, having been appointed Ambassador to Germany by President Herbert Hoover.

== Ambassador ==
Sackett served as Ambassador to Germany from February 12, 1930, to March 24, 1933. On March 23, 1933, the German Reichstag passed an Ermächtigungsgesetz (“empowering law”) which gave then-Chancellor Hitler's executive branch the authority to make laws without parliamentary approval, allowing Hitler to rule by decree. The next day, Sackett sent a telegram to the State Department: "On the basis of this law the Hitler Cabinet can reconstruct the entire system of government as it eliminates practically all constitutional restraints." He then resigned his post and resumed afterwards his former business activities.

== Death ==
He died of a heart attack while visiting Baltimore, and is buried in Cave Hill Cemetery, Louisville.

Senator Sackett was a companion of the Ohio Commandery of the Military Order of the Loyal Legion of the United States by right of his father's service in the Union Army during the American Civil War.

Party political offices
| Preceded by Ben Bruner | Republican nominee for U.S. senator from Kentucky (Class 2); 1924 | Succeeded by John M. Robsion |
U.S. Senate
| Preceded by Augustus O. Stanley | United States Senator (Class 2) from Kentucky; 1925–1930 | Succeeded by John M. Robsion |
Diplomatic posts
| Preceded by Jacob Gould Schurman | United States Ambassador to Germany; February 12, 1930 – March 24, 1933 | Succeeded by William E. Dodd |
