= 1947 United States gubernatorial elections =

- November 4, 1947 (KY and MS); April 20, 1948 (LA)

3 governorships
	Majority party	Minority party
Party	Republican	Democratic
Seats before	25	23
Seats after	24	24
Seat change	▼1	▲1
Seats up	1	2
Seats won	0	3
- Democratic hold Democratic gain

United States gubernatorial elections were held in 1947, in three states. Kentucky, Louisiana and Mississippi hold their gubernatorial elections in odd numbered years, every 4 years, preceding the United States presidential election year.

== Race summary ==
=== Results ===
State	Incumbent	Party	First elected	Result	Candidates
Kentucky	Simeon Willis	Republican	1943	Incumbent term-limited. New governor elected. Democratic gain.	✓ Earle Clements (Democratic) 57.24%; Eldon S. Dummit (Republican) 42.48%; W. A. Sandefur (Socialist) 0.29%
Louisiana (Held, 20 April 1948)	Jimmie Davis	Democratic	1944	Incumbent term-limited. New governor elected. Democratic hold.	✓ Earl Long (Democratic); Unopposed
Mississippi	Fielding L. Wright	Democratic	1946 (Note: Wright took office after his predecessor (Thomas L. Bailey) died.)	Incumbent elected to full term.	✓ Fielding L. Wright (Democratic) 97.59%; George L. Sheldon (Independent Republican) 2.41%
