= 1943 United States gubernatorial elections =

- November 2, 1943; April 18, 1944 (LA)

4 governorships
	Majority party	Minority party
Party	Republican	Democratic
Seats before	24 (Note: Walter Samuel Goodland (R) succeeded Wisconsin Governor-elect Orland S. Loomis (Progressive) who died before his inauguration in January 1943.)	24
Seats after	26	22
Seat change	▲2	▼2
Seats up	0	4
Seats won	2	2
- Democratic hold Republican gain

United States gubernatorial elections were held in 1943, in four states. Kentucky, Louisiana and Mississippi hold their gubernatorial elections in odd numbered years, every 4 years, preceding the United States presidential election year. New Jersey at this time held gubernatorial elections every 3 years, which it would abandon in 1949.

== Race summary ==
=== Results ===
State	Incumbent	Party	First elected	Result	Candidates
Kentucky	Keen Johnson	Democratic	1939 (Note: Johnson took office after his predecessor (Happy Chandler) resigned. He was subsequently elected in the 1939 Kentucky gubernatorial election.)	Incumbent term-limited. New governor elected. Republican gain.	✓ Simeon Willis (Republican) 50.49%; J. Lyter Donaldson (Democratic) 48.93%; Andrew N. Johnson (Prohibition) 0.59%
Louisiana (Held, 18 April 1944)	Sam H. Jones	Democratic	1940	Incumbent term-limited. New governor elected. Democratic hold.	✓ Jimmie Davis (Democratic); Unopposed
Mississippi	Paul B. Johnson Sr.	Democratic	1939	Incumbent term-limited. New governor elected. Democratic hold.	✓ Thomas L. Bailey (Democratic); Unopposed
New Jersey	Charles Edison	Democratic	1940	Incumbent term-limited. New governor elected. Republican gain.	✓ Walter Evans Edge (Republican) 55.20%; Vincent J. Murphy (Democratic) 44.08%; John C. Butterworth (Socialist Labor) 0.40%; John Binns (National Prohibition) 0.18%; Roy V. H. Wilkinson (Socialist) 0.14%
