= Governor Willis =

Governor Willis may refer to:

- Frank B. Willis (1871–1928), 47th Governor of Ohio
- Simeon Willis (1879–1965), 46th Governor of Kentucky
