= Senator Withers =

Senator Withers may refer to:

- Garrett Withers (1884–1953), U.S. Senator from Kentucky from 1949 to 1950
- Robert E. Withers (1821–1907), U.S. Senator from Virginia from 1875 to 1881
