= Kenneth H. Tuggle =

American politician (1904–1978)

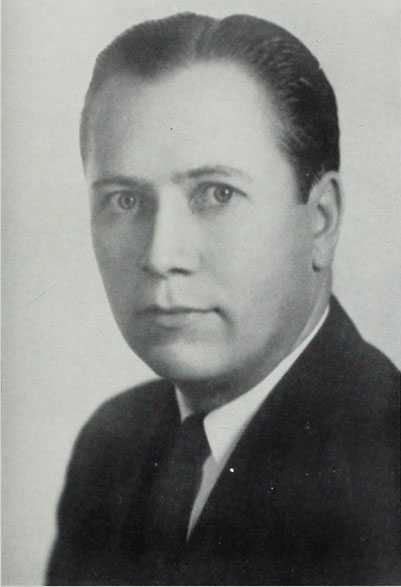
- Tuggle, c. 1945

39th Lieutenant Governor of Kentucky
- In office December 7, 1943 – December 9, 1947
- Governor: Simeon S. Willis
- Preceded by: Rodes K. Myers
- Succeeded by: Lawrence Wetherby

Personal details
- Born: Kenneth Herndon Tuggle; June 12, 1904 Barbourville, Kentucky
- Died: February 17, 1978 (aged 73)
- Party: Republican
- Spouse: Mary Vivian Shifley
- Children: 2
- Education: University of Kentucky
- Profession: Lawyer

Kenneth H. Tuggle (June 12, 1904 – February 17, 1978) was an American politician who served as the 39th lieutenant governor of Kentucky from 1943 to 1947 as a member of the Republican Party. It was 53 years before another Republican was elected lieutenant governor of Kentucky.

Admitted to the Kentucky Bar in 1926, Tuggle maintained a private law practice up to his appointment to the Interstate Commerce Commission in 1953. In 1939 he was the Republican nominee for Attorney General of Kentucky but lost the general election. In 1943 he was nominated for lieutenant governor and was narrowly elected, with Simeon S. Willis at the top of the ticket. Tuggle won by a count of 265,833 votes to 264,793; he had won just barely half of the vote against Democratic nominee William H. May.

In 1953 President Dwight Eisenhower appointed Tuggle to the Interstate Commerce Commission, was reappointed by President Kennedy in 1961 and Tuggle remained on it until he retired on December 31, 1975. He developed a reputation as one of the nation's leading experts on the railroad industry.

== Notes ==
Political offices
Preceded by Rodes K. Myers	Lieutenant Governor of Kentucky; 1943–1947	Succeeded by Lawrence Wetherby
