= 1947 Kentucky gubernatorial election =

- November 4, 1947
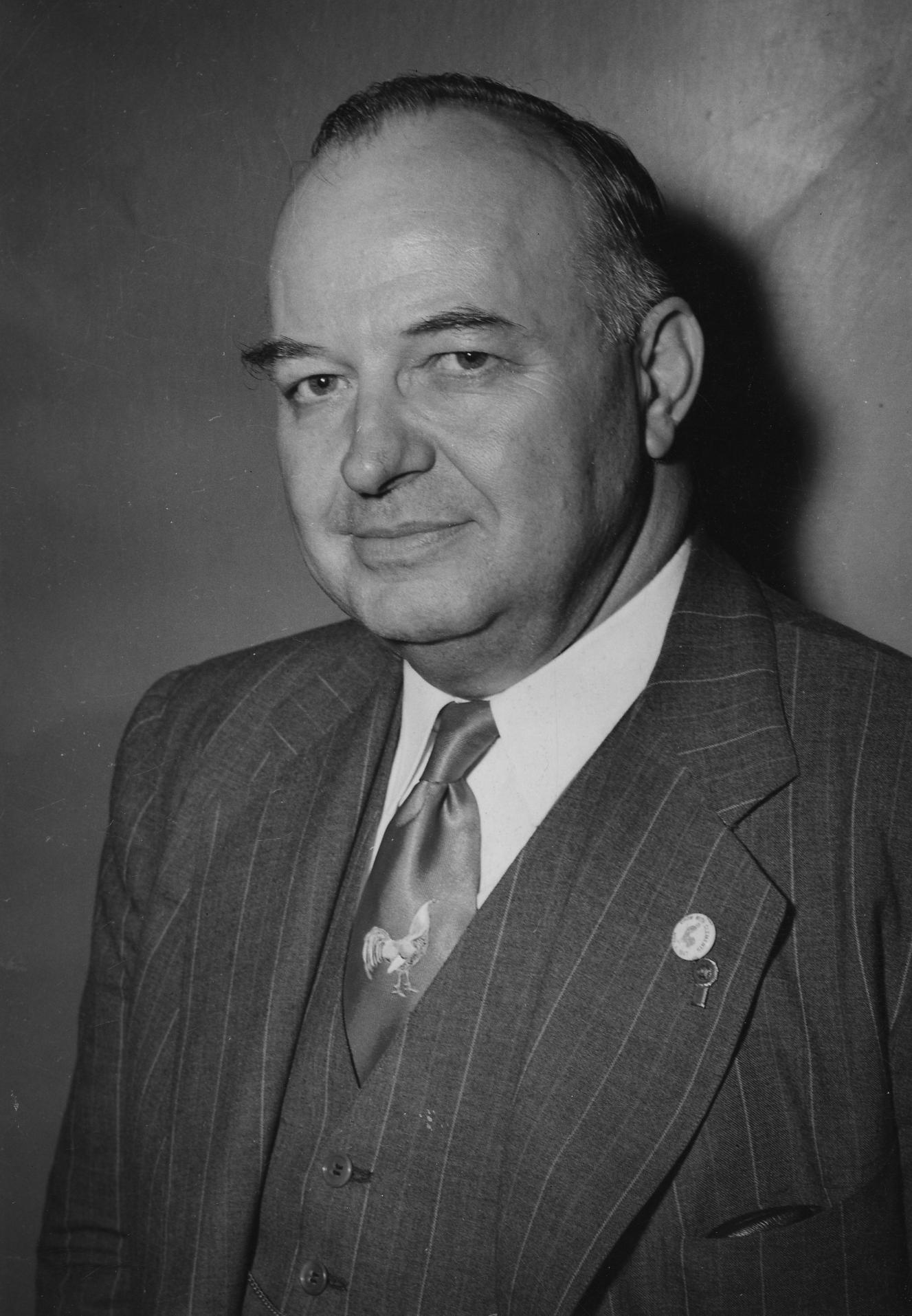

Nominee	Earle Clements	Eldon S. Dummit
Party	Democratic	Republican
Popular vote	387,795	287,756
Percentage	57.24%	42.47%
- Clements: 40–50% 50–60% 60–70% 70–80% 80–90% 90–100% Dummit: 50–60% 60–70% 70–80% 80–90%
Governor before election
Simeon Willis
Republican
Elected Governor
Earle Clements
Democratic

The 1947 Kentucky gubernatorial election was held on November 4, 1947. Democratic nominee Earle Clements defeated Republican nominee Eldon S. Dummit with 57.24% of the vote.

== Primary elections ==
Primary elections were held on August 2, 1947.

=== Republican primary ===
==== Candidates ====
- Eldon S. Dummit, Attorney General of Kentucky
- John F. Williams
- Jesse W. Knox

==== Results ====
Primary results by county Dummit: 40%–50%; 50%–60%; 60%–70%; 70%–80%; 80%–90%; 90%–100%; Williams: 40%–50%; 50%–60%; 60%–70%; 70%–80%; 80%–90%; 90%–100%

Republican primary results
Party	Candidate	Votes	%
Republican	Eldon S. Dummit	68,755	51.98
Republican	John F. Williams	60,345	45.62
Republican	Jesse W. Knox	3,175	2.40
Total votes		132,275	100.00

=== Democratic primary ===
==== Candidates ====
- Earle Clements, U.S. Representative
- Harry Lee Waterfield, State Representative
- R. E. Lee Murphy

==== Results ====
Primary results by county Clements: 40%–50%; 50%–60%; 60%–70%; 70%–80%; 80%–90%; 90%–100%; Waterfield: 40%–50%; 50%–60%; 60%–70%; 70%–80%; 80%–90%; 90%–100%

Democratic primary results
Party	Candidate	Votes	%
Democratic	Earle Clements	158,196	54.88
Democratic	Harry Lee Waterfield	125,276	43.46
Democratic	R. E. Lee Murphy	4,780	1.66
Total votes		288,252	100.00

== General election ==
=== Candidates ===
Major party candidates

- Earle Clements, Democratic
- Eldon S. Dummit, Republican

Other candidates

- W. A. Sandefur, Socialist

=== Results ===
1947 Kentucky gubernatorial election
Party	Candidate	Votes	%	±%
Democratic	Earle C. Clements	387,795	57.24	+8.31
Republican	Eldon S. Dummit	287,756	42.47	−8.01
Socialist	W. A. Sandefur	1,928	0.28	N/A
Total votes		677,479	100.0	N/A
Democratic gain from Republican				
