= Earle Clements =

American farmer and politician (1896–1985)

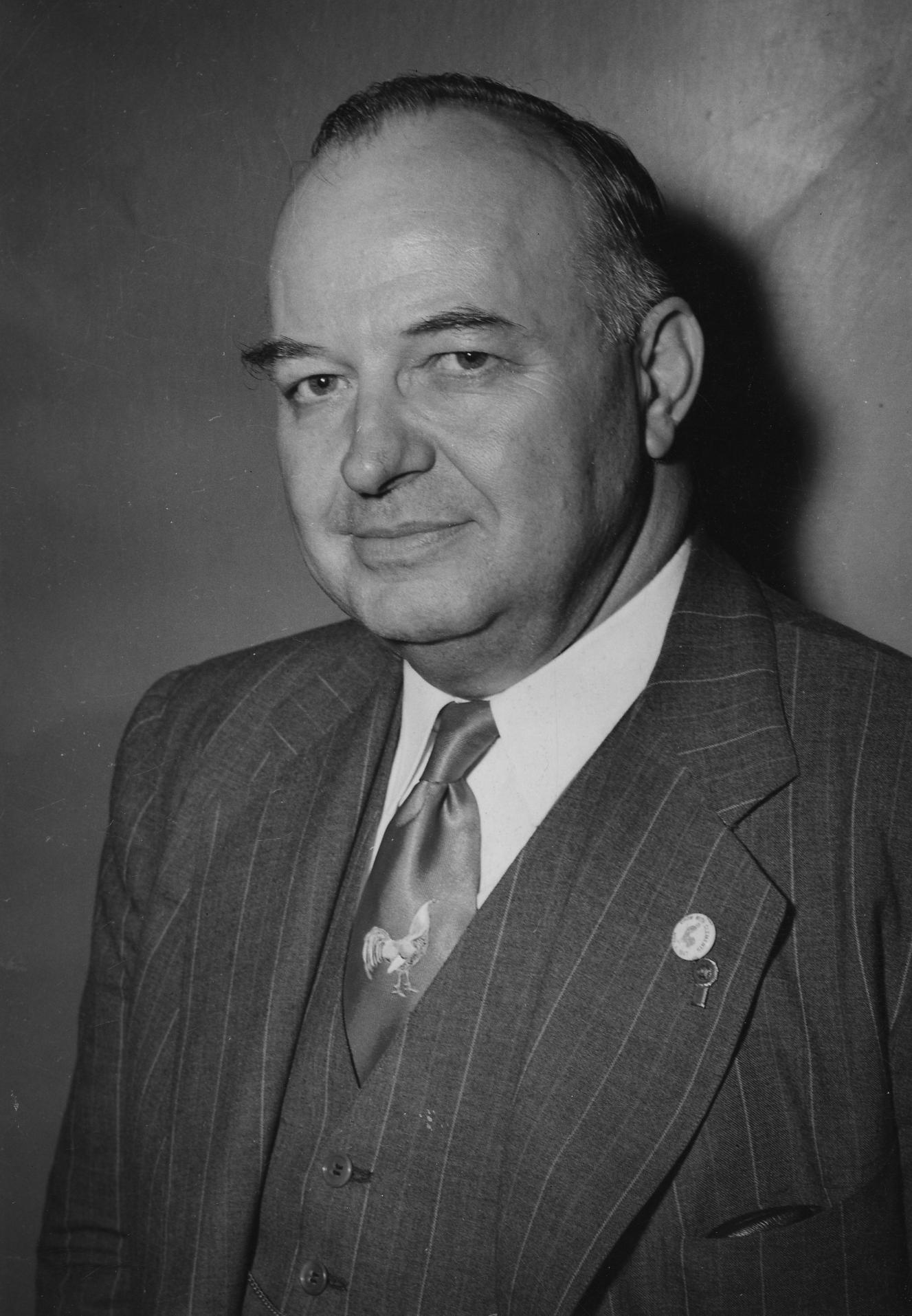
- Clements in 1947

Senate Majority Whip
- In office January 3, 1955 – January 3, 1957
- Leader: Lyndon B. Johnson
- Preceded by: Leverett Saltonstall
- Succeeded by: Mike Mansfield

Senate Minority Whip
- In office January 3, 1953 – January 3, 1955
- Leader: Lyndon B. Johnson
- Preceded by: Leverett Saltonstall
- Succeeded by: Leverett Saltonstall

United States Senator from Kentucky
- In office November 27, 1950 – January 3, 1957
- Preceded by: Garrett L. Withers
- Succeeded by: Thruston Morton

47th Governor of Kentucky
- In office December 9, 1947 – November 27, 1950
- Lieutenant: Lawrence Wetherby
- Preceded by: Simeon Willis
- Succeeded by: Lawrence Wetherby

Member of the U.S. House of Representatives from Kentucky's 2nd district
- In office January 3, 1945 – January 6, 1948
- Preceded by: Beverly M. Vincent
- Succeeded by: John A. Whitaker

Member of the Kentucky Senate from the 4th district
- In office January 1, 1942 – January 3, 1945
- Preceded by: John A. Sugg Jr.
- Succeeded by: Stanley Hoffman

Personal details
- Born: Earle Chester Clements; October 22, 1896 Morganfield, Kentucky, U.S.
- Died: March 12, 1985 (aged 88) Morganfield, Kentucky, U.S.
- Resting place: Odd Fellows Cemetery, Morganfield, Kentucky, U.S.
- Party: Democratic
- Spouse: Sara Blue
- Education: University of Kentucky (BS)

Military service
- Allegiance: United States
- Branch/service: United States Army
- Years of service: 1917–1919
- Rank: Captain
- Battles/wars: World War I

Earle Chester Clements (October 22, 1896 – March 12, 1985) was a Kentucky politician. He represented the Commonwealth of Kentucky in both the U.S. House of Representatives and the U.S. Senate and was its 47th governor, serving from 1947 to 1950, after serving in the state Senate. For 25 years, he was the leader of a faction of the state's Democratic Party that stood in opposition to the faction led by two-time governor and senator A. B. "Happy" Chandler.

After following his father into the local politics of his home county, Clements agreed to chair the gubernatorial campaign of Thomas Rhea in 1935. Already committed to Rhea, he turned down an offer from Happy Chandler to chair his campaign, beginning the rift between the two men. Clements was elected to the Kentucky Senate in 1941. In 1944, he was elected floor leader of its Democratic majority and successfully campaigned for a larger budget than that proposed by Republican governor Simeon Willis. His stand against Willis made him popular in the Democratic Party, and he was elected to the U.S. House of Representatives in 1944 and 1946.

In 1947, Clements succeeded the term-limited Willis, defeating Harry Lee Waterfield, Chandler's preferred candidate, in the Democratic primary. As governor, Clements raised taxes and used the revenue to increase funding for the state park system and construct and maintain more roads. He also achieved advancements in education, including some progress toward desegregation. In 1950, Clements was elected to the U.S. Senate. He resigned as governor to take the seat. While in the Senate, he served as Democratic party whip under party leader Lyndon Johnson and as executive director of the Senate Democratic Reelection Committee from 1957 to 1959. He was defeated by Thruston Morton in his re-election bid in 1956; a lack of support from Chandler (then serving his second term as governor) contributed to Clements' defeat. At Johnson's insistence, Clements resumed chairing the Senate Democratic Campaign Committee in 1957 and 1959.

Clements had supported Bert T. Combs for governor against Chandler in the 1955 primary, and did so again against Waterfield in 1959, brokering a deal for Louisville lawyer Wilson Wyatt to drop his bid for governor and run for lieutenant governor on an unofficial ticket headed by Combs. Combs defeated Waterfield and rewarded Clements by appointing him state highway commissioner. In 1960, Clements and Combs split over a deal to lease dump trucks from a Louisville car dealer. State newspapers charged that the deal was payback to the dealer, a Combs supporter. When Combs canceled the deal Clements took it as a public rebuke and soon after resigned to work on the presidential campaign of his friend, Lyndon Johnson. Following his split with Combs, Clements allied himself with the Chandler faction, opposing Wyatt in his bid to unseat Senator Thruston Morton. Clements' influence declined rapidly after the split with Combs, and by the 1963 gubernatorial race, he was unable to deliver his home county for Chandler in the primary against Edward T. Breathitt, who was nominated. When Johnson became president as the result of the assassination of John F. Kennedy in November 1963, Clements' friendship with him made Clements a logical choice to lobby for the Tobacco Institute, a coalition of cigarette manufacturers, who were increasingly having to play defense in Congress. After two years as a lobbyist for the institute, he was its president from 1966 to 1970, and remained on its payroll as a consultant until he died on March 12, 1985.

== Early life ==
Earle C. Clements was born in Morganfield, Kentucky, on October 22, 1896. He was the youngest of two sons and four daughters born to Aaron Waller and Sallie Anna (Tuley) Clements. His father was a popular county judge and sheriff in Union County, but Clements at first shunned a political career. He obtained his early education in the public schools, and graduated from Morganfield High School in 1915. Later in 1915, he enrolled at the University of Kentucky's College of Agriculture. In 1915 and 1916, he played center on the football team, and was named to the "All-Southern Team" in 1916. He was also a member of the Pi Kappa Alpha fraternity.

Clements' studies were interrupted by World War I. On July 9, 1917, he enlisted as a private in Company M of the Kentucky National Guard. The company was ordered to Camp Taylor near Louisville, Kentucky, where they were mustered into the infantry of the U.S. Army. Clements first served as a guard at Camp Taylor and later entered the Officers Training School at Fort Benjamin Harrison near Indianapolis, Indiana. He graduated with the rank of first lieutenant and remained stateside as a professor of military science. He served for a total of 28 months, attaining the rank of captain, and was discharged on September 12, 1919.

After the war, Clements worked as a rigger in the oil fields of east Texas. In 1921, however, his father's health began to fail, and he returned to Kentucky to help him on the farm and served as his deputy sheriff. As a hobby, he also coached football at Morganfield High School, with some success. One of his assistant coaches, Rodes K. Myers, would go on to be lieutenant governor under Keen Johnson. On January 18, 1927, Clements married Sara M. Blue. Their only child, Elizabeth (Bess) Hughes Clements Abell, was social secretary to Lady Bird Johnson in 1961-69 and Walter Mondale when he was vice president.

== Political career ==
In 1925, Clements' father died, and Clements was appointed to serve out the remainder of his term as sheriff. Kentucky sheriffs at that time could not seek re-election, and he was elected county clerk in 1925. He served two four-year terms in that office. In 1933, he was elected county judge. During his two terms, which lasted until 1941, he supervised paving of 123 miles of road in the county — more than all the previous county judges combined — despite the financial hardships of the Great Depression.

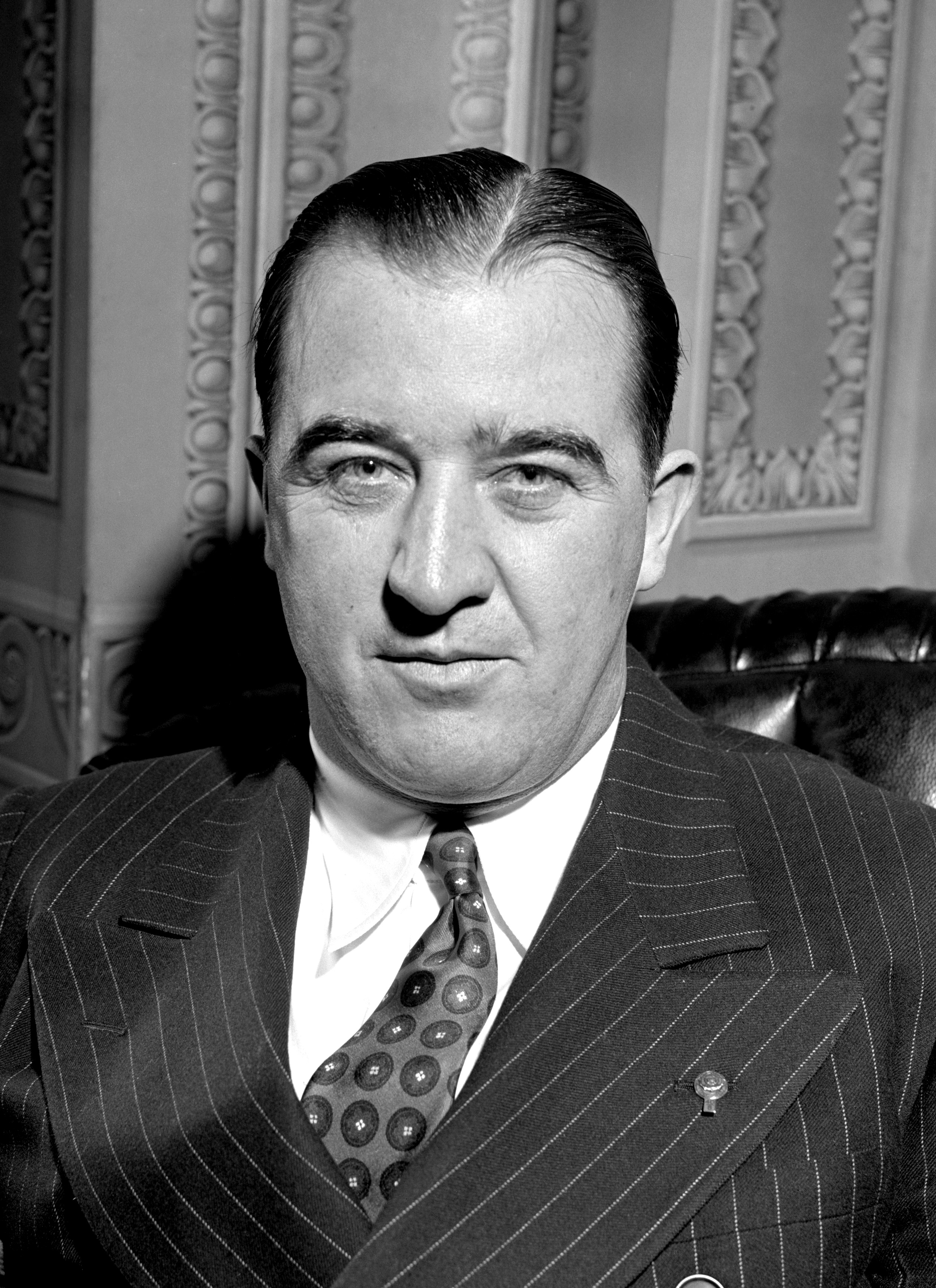
Happy Chandler led the anti-Clements faction of the Kentucky Democratic Party for decades

In 1935, Thomas Rhea of Russellville, a former state treasurer and highway commissioner, asked Clements to serve as his campaign chairman for the 1935 gubernatorial race. Clements accepted, and consequently had to refuse a later request from his boyhood friend, A. B. "Happy" Chandler, to fill the same position for his campaign. Chandler won the Democratic primary, and for 25 years, Clements and Chandler led opposite factions of the Kentucky Democratic Party. Chandler claimed that Clements bolted the party and supported Republican candidate King Swope in the general election; Clements denied this, but admitted that he gave Chandler's campaign only minimal support.

Clements was elected to the Kentucky Senate in 1941, representing Union, Webster, and Henderson counties. By 1944, he had risen to the post of majority leader in that body and played a central role in writing the state's budget that year. Due to Clements' efforts, educational appropriations were increased far above what had been called for by Republican Gov. Simeon Willis.

Clements' face-off with Willis made him popular and prominent, and helped him organize a campaign that forced the withdrawal of Rep. B.M. Vincent of Brownsville from the 1944 Democratic primary for the U.S. House of Representatives representing Kentucky's Second District, making him the party nominee without opposition. He defeated Republican Otis White of Morgantown and was re-elected in 1946. A New Deal Democrat, Clements voted to increase funding to the Rural Electrification Administration and advocated for the 1945 National School Lunch Act. He supported expansion of agricultural research and reorganization of the Farm Security Administration. He endorsed conservation and wildlife programs and additional funding to federal parks. He supported civil rights legislation, such as bans on lynching and poll taxes and he did not sign the 1956 Southern Manifesto despite school segregation being legally required in Kentucky prior to Brown v. Board of Education (1954). He opposed the 1947 Taft-Hartley Act and voted to disband the House Un-American Activities Committee. His service on the Select House Committee on Food Shortages gave him the chance to interact closely with President Harry S. Truman.

=== Governorship ===
Although encouraged to run for a seat in the Senate in 1946, Clements instead made the race for governor in 1947. In the Democratic primary, he faced Harry Lee Waterfield, a former Speaker of the Kentucky House of Representatives. Not known for his oratory or personality, Clements was a masterful campaign organizer. He secured the support of many Western Kentucky Democrats by allying himself with Logan County political boss Emerson "Doc" Beauchamp, an ally of the recently deceased Rhea. He chose Lexington Herald-Leader editor Tom Underwood as his campaign manager, strengthening his influence in Central Kentucky. He befriended Judge Lawrence Wetherby of Jefferson County, which helped him with the urban vote and Carl D. Perkins of Knott County which helped him in rural eastern Kentucky.

During the primary campaign, two major issues surfaced. Waterfield favored a tax on parimutuel betting, while Clements opposed it. Waterfield supported development of electric power through public utilities, while Clements favored private development (which won him the support of the Kentucky Utilities company). The Clements campaign also attacked Waterfield for being deemed physically unfit for military service. Clements received a late boost when he gained the endorsement of John Y. Brown, Sr., garnering added support from organized labor. Ultimately, Clements defeated Waterfield by over 30,000 votes.

In the general election, Clements faced Republican state attorney general Eldon S. Dummit. While Clements managed to keep the Democrats united following the primary, Dummit had fractured the Republicans by attacking the administration of Republican Gov. Simeon S. Willis and his preferred successor during the Republican primary. Dummit mounted a meager challenge by citing Clements' opposition to the Taft-Hartley Act that organized labor opposed, but this was not very effective. Dummit had replaced his campaign manager from the primary election, and when the ousted manager turned against him in the general election, it sounded the death knell for his campaign. Clements won the election by a vote of 387,795 (57%) to 287,756 (42%). He resigned his seat in the U.S. House to accept the governorship.

As governor, Clements enjoyed a three-to-one Democratic majority in both houses of the state legislature. As a result of that, much of his proposed legislative agenda was passed. In the 1948 legislative session, the General Assembly attracted new businesses by lowering taxes on stocks and bonds and the inheritance tax, but offset these cuts by approving Clements' proposals to increase taxes on gasoline and distilled spirits. Clements also reversed his campaign stance against a tax on parimutuel betting, reportedly proposing a 3% tax because he feared a higher rate would be proposed if he did not take the initiative. With this new revenue, Clements authorized $6 million to improve and expand the state park system. The improvement program included twelve large parks and several smaller ones, with Kentucky Dam Park being the centerpiece. To oversee the developments, he appointed Paducah Sun Editor Henry Ward as commissioner of conservation. Between 1948 and 1950, New York was the only state that spent more than Kentucky on its park system. Clements was one of several people who have been referred to as the "father of Kentucky's state parks". Although the park system was started in 1926 by Willard Rouse Jillson, Clements did much to develop them during his administration.

Clements authorized significant road building projects. During his administration, the state funded or built 3,800 miles of rural roads and 4,000 miles of primary roads. Further, he initiated plans for the Kentucky Turnpike and the Western Kentucky Parkway. The state also assumed maintenance of 6,000 miles of county roads under Clements. During Clements' tenure, only Texas spent more money on developing its roads. Besides improving the roadways themselves, Clements replaced the Kentucky Highway Patrol, which had become a corrupt vehicle of political patronage, with the Kentucky State Police. Clements also used some of the revenue generated from his tax increases to raise the salaries of the state's public school teachers. He approved a 15% increase in funding to the Minimum Foundation Program which provided funding for poor school districts. This was not enough, however, to stave off a 1950 protest march on his office by teachers demanding that he raise another $10 million for education. Clements' lieutenant governor and successor, Lawrence Wetherby, was able to meet this demand in 1951 by using increased tax revenue resulting from the Korean War.

Leading national accreditation groups attempted to disaccredit many of Kentucky's public colleges during Clements' administration in order to end longstanding political interference in the higher education system. Clements worked to help these colleges maintain their accreditation and to secure re-accreditation for Morehead State Teachers College. In 1948, he weakened Kentucky's Day Law—which enforced segregation of the state's education system—by providing an exception for black medical personnel to take post-graduate courses in white public hospitals. He also supported a 1948 bill that allowed blacks to pursue medical training at the University of Louisville. His efforts to secure a similar arrangement at the University of Kentucky were not successful, despite the governor's status as ex-officio chairman of the UK Board of Trustees. In 1949, the federal district court in Lexington granted blacks admission to programs at UK if an equivalent program was not available at Kentucky State College, the state's historically black college.

Clements also created or reorganized several government agencies. In cooperation with Pennsylvania governor James H. Duff, he created the Ohio River Sanitation Commission (ORANSCO) to combat pollution in the Ohio River and its tributaries. He curbed fraud in the insurance industry by reorganizing the state Insurance Commission and hiring a national prominent expert to rewrite the state's entire insurance code. To assist the General Assembly in writing more effective and efficient legislation, Clements created the non-partisan Legislative Research Commission, stocked with professionals from various disciplines, to conduct research and serve as legislative staff. He created the Kentucky Agriculture and Industrial Board (the predecessor of the current Kentucky Department of Commerce), which attracted 250 new industries to the state and created 40,000 new jobs during its first three years. He also created the Kentucky Building Commission to manage and plan all new state buildings. Among the commission's first projects were a new $6 million Capitol Annex and the construction of a new state fairgrounds in Louisville. To retain the most qualified government employees, he supported a constitutional amendment that quadrupled the minimum annual salary for state employees from $5,000 to $20,000.

Although a strong governor with many successes, Clements was not able to enact his full legislative agenda. In 1948, his proposal to create a centralized board that governed all Kentucky colleges failed in the General Assembly. In both the 1948 and 1950 legislative sessions, Clements failed to convince the General Assembly to regulate strip mining. He also failed in his attempts to establish statewide pension and civil service programs, and was unable to enact a merit system to give civil-service protection to state employees. Attempts to fund a veterans' bonus passed the two houses of the General Assembly in different forms and were unable to be reconciled.

=== Senator ===
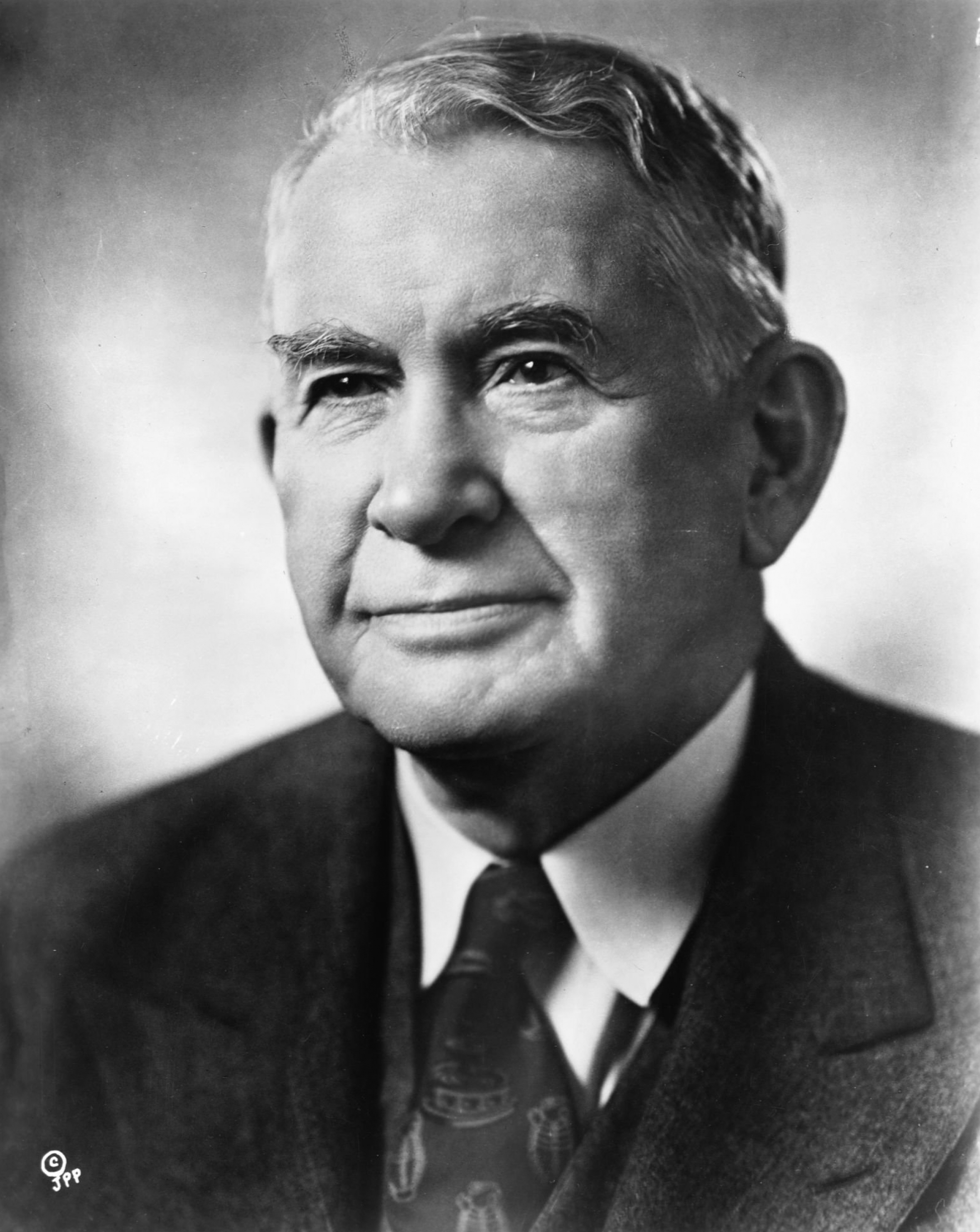
Alben Barkley

When Alben Barkley resigned his Senate seat to assume the office of vice president in 1949, Clements appointed Highway Commissioner Garrett L. Withers to fill the seat until Clements could run for the next six-year term in 1950. He won the election over Republican Charles I. Dawson by a vote of 300,276 (54%) to 256,876 (45%). On November 27, 1950, Withers resigned as senator, Clements resigned as governor, and Lieutenant Governor Lawrence Wetherby succeeded as governor, immediately appointing Clements to fill the vacancy to allow him to gain seniority over other senators elected that month.

The Democrats lost seats in the Senate in the 1950 election cycle, and party leader Ernest McFarland removed Clinton Anderson as chairman of the Senate Democratic Reelection Committee, replacing him with Clements for the 1952 election cycle. Clements advocated better cooperation between his committee and the Democratic National Committee in 1952. However, Republicans won the presidency and both houses of Congress in 1952, and the Democratic National Committee talked openly of disbanding the Reelection Committee. Clements instead advised that his committee's responsibilities be expanded and that its activities become year-round rather than seasonal.

In 1953, Clements was appointed Democratic party whip, serving under party leader Lyndon B. Johnson. In addition, he retained his chairmanship of the Senate Democratic Reelection Committee for the 1954 election cycle. He and Democratic National Committee chair Stephen Mitchell agreed that the two committees should conduct separate fund-raising operations in order to maximize donations for Democratic candidates. Democrats regained control of the Senate in 1954, and Clements instituted the practice of having his committee provide transition services for freshman senators. That practice continues today.

Clements remained active in state politics, leading a faction of the Democratic Party that opposed Happy Chandler, who had been less involved in politics when he was baseball commissioner from 1946 to 1951. When Chandler announced in 1955 that he would seek a second term, the Clements faction scrambled to find a candidate. The most likely choice was Wetherby's lieutenant governor, Emerson "Doc" Beauchamp, but his uninspiring persona and ties to boss-dominated Logan County made him unacceptable to Clements. Instead, Clements threw his support to Bert T. Combs, a Court of Appeals judge nominated by Wetherby. Since Combs had little in the way of a political record to run against, Chandler focused his campaign attacks on factional leaders Clements and Wetherby, who he nicknamed "Clementine and Wetherbine". These attacks, combined with a poorly run campaign by Combs, allowed Chandler to win the Democratic primary by a margin of 18,000 votes. He went on to win the general election and a second gubernatorial term.

=== 1956 re-election bid ===
Clements began his campaign for re-election in 1956 by defeating Joe Bates, the candidate favored by Chandler, in the Democratic primary. On April 30, 1956, Barkley died of a heart attack, opening up the other seat. With filing for the Democratic primary already over, the Democratic State Central Committee was charged with selecting a candidate. They chose Wetherby. Journalist John Ed Pearce later recorded that Clements had favored Chandler's choice, Frankfort lawyer Joseph Leary, over Wetherby. Clements thought Leary, one of the few political figures who remained on good terms with Clements and Chandler, didn't have a very good chance of winning, but his selection would keep Chandler from throwing his support to the Republican candidates.

Republican president Dwight D. Eisenhower convinced Ambassador to India John Sherman Cooper, who had served two short Senate terms and was immensely popular in Kentucky, to be the Republican candidate for the seat of Barkley, who had defeated Cooper in 1954. In the Republican primary, voters chose Thruston B. Morton to challenge Clements. With two of his factional enemies as candidates for the Senate, Chandler bolted the party and supported the Republican candidates. Further complicating Clements' campaign was the fact that Senate majority leader Lyndon Johnson suffered a heart attack in 1955, and Clements had to spend much of his time covering for Johnson. He devoted much time to Wetherby's campaign, since Democrats believed Clements would be re-elected easily while Wetherby faced much stiffer odds. And Clements had drawn opposition from doctors by voting, at Johnson's behest, to create a disability program in Social Security, an idea they saw as the start of "socialized medicine." These factors, combined with the landslide of support for Eisenhower, who was running for re-election, contributed to the defeat of both Wetherby and Clements. Cooper defeated Wetherby by 65,365 votes, while Clements lost to Morton by a margin of 6,981 votes out of more than 1 million that were cast in the election. It was Clements' first defeat for elected office in a career that spanned thirty years. Johnson biographer Robert Caro blamed Clements' loss on the Social Security vote.

== Later life ==
Clements never again sought an elected office after his defeat, though he remained active in state politics and continued to lead the anti-Chandler faction of his party. From 1957 to 1959, at the insistence of Lyndon Johnson, he served as executive director of the United States Senate Democratic Campaign Committee and helped engineer a gain of 15 seats by Democrats in 1958. He considered running for governor again in 1959, but ultimately decided against it. Without Clements in the race, the anti-Chandler faction was unable to unite behind either former candidate Bert T. Combs or former Louisville mayor Wilson Wyatt. Clements united the faction behind Combs, making Wilson Wyatt their candidate for lieutenant governor and promising him support for later races. Combs defeated the Chandler candidate, Harry Lee Waterfield, in the Democratic primary and went on to win the general election.

In 1960, Combs appointed Clements as state highway commissioner. Some state newspapers charged that Clements had demanded this post at the head of the state's largest executive department in exchange for supporting Combs, a charge Combs denied. Others wondered if Clements took the post in order to organize the state political machinery for his friend Johnson, who was planning to run for president. Still others believed that, from his powerful post, Clements would be the real governor and Combs only a puppet. In March 1960, news broke that the highway department was about to lease 34 used dump trucks at a very favorable price from Louisville Ford dealer Thurston Cooke, who had served as finance chairman for Combs' gubernatorial campaign. Some charged that this amounted to a political payoff by Clements. Combs, already under fire for appointing Clements, canceled the lease bid on April 19. Clements was offended by this action and considered it a public rebuke. The incident caused a rift between Combs and Clements that never fully healed, although Clements did not resign immediately.

In August 1960, Clements met with Combs and told him he wanted to resign to work for Johnson's vice-presidential campaign. Combs called a press conference and announced that Clements' resignation would be effective September 1 and that he would be replaced by Henry Ward. The resignation was the end of the Clements faction of the state Democratic Party. His split with Combs was so severe that he allied with his longtime foe, Happy Chandler, against what became the Combs faction. In the 1962 senatorial race, Clements opposed Wyatt's challenge to Morton. Morton won, ending Wyatt's political career. Chandler again sought the Democratic gubernatorial nomination in 1963. Clements appeared on stage with Chandler at a rally where Chandler claimed that Combs had arranged the truck deal to discredit Clements. Chandler hoped to damage Combs' reputation and, by extension, that of his hand-picked successor Edward T. Breathitt. His strategy was unsuccessful; Breathitt won the primary and went on to win the general election. Clements' waning influence was evidenced by the fact that Breathitt carried Clements' home county of Union 2,528 to 1,913.

From 1961 to 1963, Clements was a consultant for the American Merchant Marine Institute, a coalition of U.S. shipping companies. In early 1964 he became a lobbyist for several cigarette manufacturers and their Tobacco Institute. After helping the companies head off more regulation by agreeing to a warning on cigarette packages, he became president of the Institute in 1966 and was instrumental in forging a 1969 agreement in which the companies agreed to stop television advertising in return for a stronger warning label instead of the additional regulation being demanded by health advocates. He stepped down as president in 1970 but remained a consultant to the institute until his death. In a 1978 interview, he maintained that a connection with smoking and cancer had not been proven. In 1981, he retired to his hometown of Morganfield. After several years of illness, he died on March 12, 1985, and is buried at the Odd Fellows Cemetery in Morganfield. In 1980, the Breckinridge Job Corps Center in Morganfield was renamed the Earle C. Clements Job Corps Center.

== See also ==
U.S. House of Representatives
Preceded by Beverly M. Vincent	Member of the U.S. House of Representatives from Kentucky's 2nd congressional district 1945–1948	Succeeded by John A. Whitaker
Party political offices
Preceded by J. Lyter Donaldson	Democratic nominee for Governor of Kentucky; 1947	Succeeded by Lawrence Wetherby
Preceded by Alben W. Barkley	Democratic nominee for U.S. Senator from Kentucky (Class 3); 1950, 1956	Succeeded by Wilson W. Wyatt
Preceded by Lyndon B. Johnson	Senate Democratic Whip; 1953–1957	Succeeded by Mike Mansfield
Political offices
Preceded by Simeon Willis	Governor of Kentucky; 1947–1950	Succeeded by Lawrence Wetherby
U.S. Senate
Preceded by Garrett L. Withers	U.S. Senator (Class 3) from Kentucky; 1950–1957; Served alongside: Virgil Chapman, Thomas R. Underwood, Alben W. Barkley, Robert Humphreys, John Sherman Cooper	Succeeded by Thruston Morton
Preceded by Leverett Saltonstall	Senate Minority Whip; 1953–1955	Succeeded by Leverett Saltonstall
Preceded by Leverett Saltonstall	Senate Majority Whip; 1955–1957	Succeeded by Mike Mansfield
