= 1960 United States Senate election in Kentucky =

- November 8, 1960
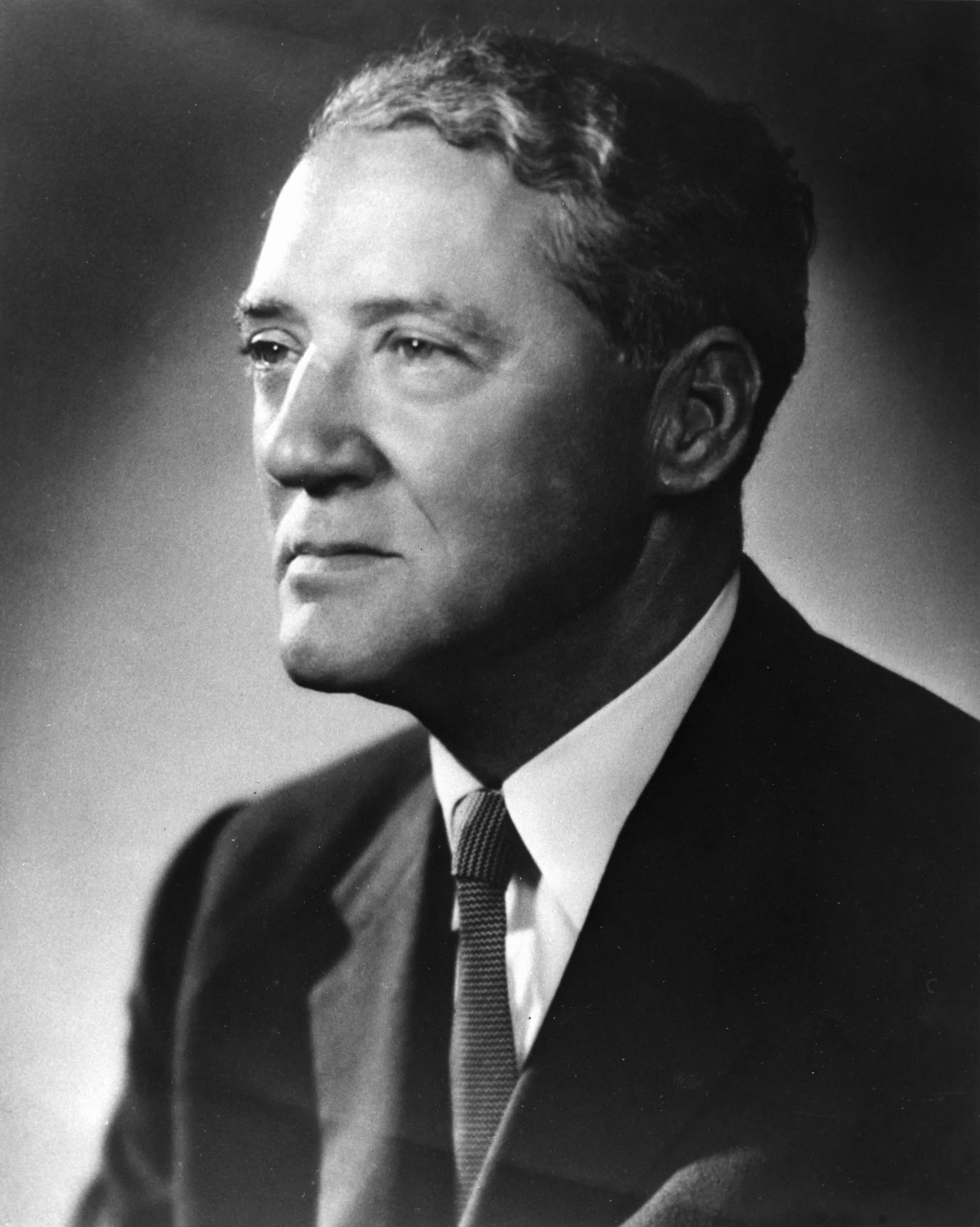

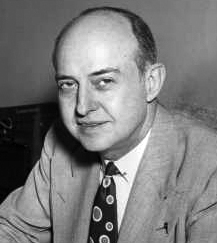
| Nominee | John Sherman Cooper | Keen Johnson |
| Party | Republican | Democratic |
| Popular vote | 644,087 | 444,830 |
| Percentage | 59.15% | 40.85% |
- County results Cooper: 50–60% 60–70% 70–80% 80–90% >90% Johnson: 50–60% 60–70%
U.S. senator before election
John Sherman Cooper
Republican
Elected U.S. Senator
John Sherman Cooper
Republican

The 1960 United States Senate election in Kentucky took place on November 6, 1960. Incumbent Republican Senator John Sherman Cooper, who won a 1956 special election to fill the vacant seat of Alben Barkley, (Note: Cooper had served three partial non-consecutive terms from 1946–49, 1952–55, and his current term from 1957–61.) was elected to a full term in office, defeating Democratic former Governor and Undersecretary of Labor Keen Johnson.

This marked the first time that Republicans won consecutive Senate elections in the state.

== Republican primary ==
=== Candidates ===
- John Sherman Cooper, incumbent Senator since 1957
- Thurman Jerome Hamlin, perennial candidate from London

=== Results ===
Republican primary results
| Party | Candidate | Votes | % |
|---|---|---|---|
| Republican | John Sherman Cooper (incumbent) | 50,896 | 96.26 |
| Republican | Thurman Jerome Hamlin | 1,978 | 3.74 |
| Total votes | | 52,874 | 100.00 |

== Democratic primary ==
=== Candidates ===
- John Y. Brown Sr., former U.S. Representative at-large and nominee for Senate in 1946
- Jesse N.R. Cecil
- Wilton Benge Cupp
- James L. Delk
- Keen Johnson, former Governor of Kentucky (1939–43) and U.S. Undersecretary of Labor (1946–47)

=== Results ===
Primary results by county Johnson: 40%–50%; 50%–60%; 60%–70%; 70%–80%; 80%–90%; 90%–100%; Brown: 40%–50%; 50%–60%; 60%–70%; 70%–80%

Democratic primary results
| Party | Candidate | Votes | % |
|---|---|---|---|
| Democratic | Keen Johnson | 112,797 | 57.97 |
| Democratic | John Y. Brown Sr. | 75,987 | 39.05 |
| Democratic | Wilton Benge Cupp | 2,209 | 1.14 |
| Democratic | Jesse N.R. Cecil | 2,083 | 1.07 |
| Democratic | James L. Delk | 1,517 | 0.78 |
| Total votes | | 194,593 | 100.00 |

== General election ==
=== Results ===
1960 U.S. Senate election in Kentucky
| Party | Candidate | Votes | % |
|---|---|---|---|
| Republican | John Sherman Cooper (incumbent) | 644,087 | 59.15% |
| Democratic | Keen Johnson | 444,830 | 40.85% |
| Total votes | | 1,088,917 | 100.00% |

==== Results by county ====
| County | John Sherman Cooper Republican | | Keen Johnson Democratic | | Margin | | Total votes cast |
| County | # | % | # | % | # | % | Total votes cast |
|---|---|---|---|---|---|---|---|
| Adair | 4,745 | 70.88% | 1,949 | 29.12% | 2,796 | 41.77% | 6,694 |
| Allen | 3,401 | 68.89% | 1,536 | 31.11% | 1,865 | 37.78% | 4,937 |
| Anderson | 2,318 | 58.48% | 1,646 | 41.52% | 672 | 16.95% | 3,964 |
| Ballard | 1,393 | 37.71% | 2,301 | 62.29% | -908 | -24.58% | 3,694 |
| Barren | 5,252 | 55.23% | 4,258 | 44.77% | 994 | 10.45% | 9,510 |
| Bath | 2,071 | 55.07% | 1,690 | 44.93% | 381 | 10.13% | 3,761 |
| Bell | 6,662 | 58.86% | 4,657 | 41.14% | 2,005 | 17.71% | 11,319 |
| Boone | 4,700 | 61.93% | 2,889 | 38.07% | 1,811 | 23.86% | 7,589 |
| Bourbon | 2,704 | 50.49% | 2,651 | 49.51% | 53 | 0.99% | 5,355 |
| Boyd | 11,657 | 59.47% | 7,945 | 40.53% | 3,712 | 18.94% | 19,602 |
| Boyle | 4,165 | 63.23% | 2,422 | 36.77% | 1,743 | 26.46% | 6,587 |
| Bracken | 2,016 | 62.90% | 1,189 | 37.10% | 827 | 25.80% | 3,205 |
| Breathitt | 2,143 | 41.99% | 2,960 | 58.01% | -817 | -16.01% | 5,103 |
| Breckinridge | 4,137 | 60.92% | 2,654 | 39.08% | 1,483 | 21.84% | 6,791 |
| Bullitt | 2,941 | 58.02% | 2,128 | 41.98% | 813 | 16.04% | 5,069 |
| Butler | 3,610 | 80.76% | 860 | 19.24% | 2,750 | 61.52% | 4,470 |
| Caldwell | 3,442 | 63.17% | 2,007 | 36.83% | 1,435 | 26.34% | 5,449 |
| Calloway | 3,792 | 48.37% | 4,048 | 51.63% | -256 | -3.27% | 7,840 |
| Campbell | 17,624 | 57.64% | 12,953 | 42.36% | 4,671 | 15.28% | 30,577 |
| Carlisle | 1,020 | 39.05% | 1,592 | 60.95% | -572 | -21.90% | 2,612 |
| Carroll | 1,296 | 40.21% | 1,927 | 59.79% | -631 | -19.58% | 3,223 |
| Carter | 5,322 | 64.00% | 2,993 | 36.00% | 2,329 | 28.01% | 8,315 |
| Casey | 4,911 | 80.42% | 1,196 | 19.58% | 3,715 | 60.83% | 6,107 |
| Christian | 5,603 | 47.86% | 6,103 | 52.14% | -500 | -4.27% | 11,706 |
| Clark | 3,672 | 58.87% | 2,566 | 41.13% | 1,106 | 17.73% | 6,238 |
| Clay | 4,802 | 78.32% | 1,329 | 21.68% | 3,473 | 56.65% | 6,131 |
| Clinton | 3,409 | 85.40% | 583 | 14.60% | 2,826 | 70.79% | 3,992 |
| Crittenden | 2,787 | 69.35% | 1,232 | 30.65% | 1,555 | 38.69% | 4,019 |
| Cumberland | 2,614 | 79.62% | 669 | 20.38% | 1,945 | 59.24% | 3,283 |
| Daviess | 13,968 | 62.14% | 8,511 | 37.86% | 5,457 | 24.28% | 22,479 |
| Edmonson | 2,834 | 75.09% | 940 | 24.91% | 1,894 | 50.19% | 3,774 |
| Elliott | 932 | 37.96% | 1,523 | 62.04% | -591 | -24.07% | 2,455 |
| Estill | 3,395 | 70.51% | 1,420 | 29.49% | 1,975 | 41.02% | 4,815 |
| Fayette | 27,379 | 67.42% | 13,228 | 32.58% | 14,151 | 34.85% | 40,607 |
| Fleming | 2,850 | 58.93% | 1,986 | 41.07% | 864 | 17.87% | 4,836 |
| Floyd | 5,657 | 39.47% | 8,676 | 60.53% | -3,019 | -21.06% | 14,333 |
| Franklin | 5,531 | 50.32% | 5,461 | 49.68% | 70 | 0.64% | 10,992 |
| Fulton | 1,761 | 43.80% | 2,260 | 56.20% | -499 | -12.41% | 4,021 |
| Gallatin | 754 | 44.88% | 926 | 55.12% | -172 | -10.24% | 1,680 |
| Garrard | 2,891 | 64.36% | 1,601 | 35.64% | 1,290 | 28.72% | 4,492 |
| Grant | 2,289 | 58.11% | 1,650 | 41.89% | 639 | 16.22% | 3,939 |
| Graves | 5,125 | 41.60% | 7,194 | 58.40% | -2,069 | -16.80% | 12,319 |
| Grayson | 4,771 | 69.69% | 2,075 | 30.31% | 2,696 | 39.38% | 6,846 |
| Green | 3,683 | 72.53% | 1,395 | 27.47% | 2,288 | 45.06% | 5,078 |
| Greenup | 6,348 | 56.62% | 4,863 | 43.38% | 1,485 | 13.25% | 11,211 |
| Hancock | 1,471 | 60.89% | 945 | 39.11% | 526 | 21.77% | 2,416 |
| Hardin | 6,722 | 61.98% | 4,124 | 38.02% | 2,598 | 23.95% | 10,846 |
| Harlan | 8,157 | 51.20% | 7,775 | 48.80% | 382 | 2.40% | 15,932 |
| Harrison | 2,641 | 46.77% | 3,006 | 53.23% | -365 | -6.46% | 5,647 |
| Hart | 3,796 | 58.80% | 2,660 | 41.20% | 1,136 | 17.60% | 6,456 |
| Henderson | 5,326 | 50.77% | 5,165 | 49.23% | 161 | 1.53% | 10,491 |
| Henry | 2,302 | 50.92% | 2,219 | 49.08% | 83 | 1.84% | 4,521 |
| Hickman | 1,303 | 42.82% | 1,740 | 57.18% | -437 | -14.36% | 3,043 |
| Hopkins | 5,576 | 47.46% | 6,173 | 52.54% | -597 | -5.08% | 11,749 |
| Jackson | 3,825 | 90.32% | 410 | 9.68% | 3,415 | 80.64% | 4,235 |
| Jefferson | 137,946 | 59.51% | 93,872 | 40.49% | 44,074 | 19.01% | 231,818 |
| Jessamine | 2,788 | 63.18% | 1,625 | 36.82% | 1,163 | 26.35% | 4,413 |
| Johnson | 5,480 | 71.84% | 2,148 | 28.16% | 3,332 | 43.68% | 7,628 |
| Kenton | 22,312 | 57.16% | 16,722 | 42.84% | 5,590 | 14.32% | 39,034 |
| Knott | 1,843 | 35.49% | 3,350 | 64.51% | -1,507 | -29.02% | 5,193 |
| Knox | 5,843 | 70.98% | 2,389 | 29.02% | 3,454 | 41.96% | 8,232 |
| Larue | 2,613 | 66.51% | 1,316 | 33.49% | 1,297 | 33.01% | 3,929 |
| Laurel | 7,342 | 78.37% | 2,026 | 21.63% | 5,316 | 56.75% | 9,368 |
| Lawrence | 3,203 | 58.82% | 2,242 | 41.18% | 961 | 17.65% | 5,445 |
| Lee | 2,000 | 69.18% | 891 | 30.82% | 1,109 | 38.36% | 2,891 |
| Leslie | 3,830 | 83.97% | 731 | 16.03% | 3,099 | 67.95% | 4,561 |
| Letcher | 4,570 | 54.78% | 3,773 | 45.22% | 797 | 9.55% | 8,343 |
| Lewis | 3,807 | 71.87% | 1,490 | 28.13% | 2,317 | 43.74% | 5,297 |
| Lincoln | 4,003 | 67.03% | 1,969 | 32.97% | 2,034 | 34.06% | 5,972 |
| Livingston | 1,592 | 52.32% | 1,451 | 47.68% | 141 | 4.63% | 3,043 |
| Logan | 4,349 | 50.91% | 4,194 | 49.09% | 155 | 1.81% | 8,543 |
| Lyon | 1,063 | 45.12% | 1,293 | 54.88% | -230 | -9.76% | 2,356 |
| Madison | 7,060 | 57.85% | 5,145 | 42.15% | 1,915 | 15.69% | 12,205 |
| Magoffin | 2,785 | 55.19% | 2,261 | 44.81% | 524 | 10.38% | 5,046 |
| Marion | 2,587 | 42.71% | 3,470 | 57.29% | -883 | -14.58% | 6,057 |
| Marshall | 3,635 | 54.08% | 3,087 | 45.92% | 548 | 8.15% | 6,722 |
| Martin | 2,731 | 74.39% | 940 | 25.61% | 1,791 | 48.79% | 3,671 |
| Mason | 4,320 | 59.03% | 2,998 | 40.97% | 1,322 | 18.07% | 7,318 |
| McCracken | 10,422 | 49.06% | 10,821 | 50.94% | -399 | -1.88% | 21,243 |
| McCreary | 3,738 | 84.42% | 690 | 15.58% | 3,048 | 68.83% | 4,428 |
| McLean | 2,316 | 58.35% | 1,653 | 41.65% | 663 | 16.70% | 3,969 |
| Meade | 2,167 | 53.57% | 1,878 | 46.43% | 289 | 7.14% | 4,045 |
| Menifee | 871 | 51.75% | 812 | 48.25% | 59 | 3.51% | 1,683 |
| Mercer | 3,838 | 64.28% | 2,133 | 35.72% | 1,705 | 28.55% | 5,971 |
| Metcalfe | 2,246 | 63.64% | 1,283 | 36.36% | 963 | 27.29% | 3,529 |
| Monroe | 4,220 | 83.07% | 860 | 16.93% | 3,360 | 66.14% | 5,080 |
| Montgomery | 2,618 | 54.84% | 2,156 | 45.16% | 462 | 9.68% | 4,774 |
| Morgan | 1,812 | 41.86% | 2,517 | 58.14% | -705 | -16.29% | 4,329 |
| Muhlenberg | 6,070 | 58.10% | 4,377 | 41.90% | 1,693 | 16.21% | 10,447 |
| Nelson | 3,782 | 49.59% | 3,844 | 50.41% | -62 | -0.81% | 7,626 |
| Nicholas | 1,136 | 47.61% | 1,250 | 52.39% | -114 | -4.78% | 2,386 |
| Ohio | 5,280 | 69.96% | 2,267 | 30.04% | 3,013 | 39.92% | 7,547 |
| Oldham | 2,494 | 60.96% | 1,597 | 39.04% | 897 | 21.93% | 4,091 |
| Owen | 1,525 | 43.82% | 1,955 | 56.18% | -430 | -12.36% | 3,480 |
| Owsley | 2,169 | 86.24% | 346 | 13.76% | 1,823 | 72.49% | 2,515 |
| Pendleton | 2,274 | 61.91% | 1,399 | 38.09% | 875 | 23.82% | 3,673 |
| Perry | 5,909 | 56.14% | 4,617 | 43.86% | 1,292 | 12.27% | 10,526 |
| Pike | 10,450 | 46.09% | 12,222 | 53.91% | -1,772 | -7.82% | 22,672 |
| Powell | 1,484 | 57.65% | 1,090 | 42.35% | 394 | 15.31% | 2,574 |
| Pulaski | 12,490 | 83.64% | 2,443 | 16.36% | 10,047 | 67.28% | 14,933 |
| Robertson | 632 | 52.32% | 576 | 47.68% | 56 | 4.64% | 1,208 |
| Rockcastle | 3,956 | 79.34% | 1,030 | 20.66% | 2,926 | 58.68% | 4,986 |
| Rowan | 2,807 | 57.06% | 2,112 | 42.94% | 695 | 14.13% | 4,919 |
| Russell | 3,683 | 78.41% | 1,014 | 21.59% | 2,669 | 56.82% | 4,697 |
| Scott | 2,415 | 52.08% | 2,222 | 47.92% | 193 | 4.16% | 4,637 |
| Shelby | 3,610 | 54.75% | 2,984 | 45.25% | 626 | 9.49% | 6,594 |
| Simpson | 1,898 | 44.98% | 2,322 | 55.02% | -424 | -10.05% | 4,220 |
| Spencer | 1,191 | 57.56% | 878 | 42.44% | 313 | 15.13% | 2,069 |
| Taylor | 4,778 | 72.31% | 1,830 | 27.69% | 2,948 | 44.61% | 6,608 |
| Todd | 1,936 | 43.29% | 2,536 | 56.71% | -600 | -13.42% | 4,472 |
| Trigg | 1,680 | 44.11% | 2,129 | 55.89% | -449 | -11.79% | 3,809 |
| Trimble | 870 | 38.34% | 1,399 | 61.66% | -529 | -23.31% | 2,269 |
| Union | 1,920 | 38.13% | 3,116 | 61.87% | -1,196 | -23.75% | 5,036 |
| Warren | 9,177 | 58.68% | 6,461 | 41.32% | 2,716 | 17.37% | 15,638 |
| Washington | 2,910 | 60.26% | 1,919 | 39.74% | 991 | 20.52% | 4,829 |
| Wayne | 4,070 | 70.48% | 1,705 | 29.52% | 2,365 | 40.95% | 5,775 |
| Webster | 2,466 | 45.46% | 2,959 | 54.54% | -493 | -9.09% | 5,425 |
| Whitley | 7,597 | 75.49% | 2,467 | 24.51% | 5,130 | 50.97% | 10,064 |
| Wolfe | 1,369 | 50.29% | 1,353 | 49.71% | 16 | 0.59% | 2,722 |
| Woodford | 2,613 | 65.67% | 1,366 | 34.33% | 1,247 | 31.34% | 3,979 |
| Totals | 644,087 | 59.15% | 444,830 | 40.85% | 199,257 | 18.30% | 1,088,917 |

== See also ==
1960 United States Senate elections
