= 1943 Kentucky gubernatorial election =

- November 2, 1943
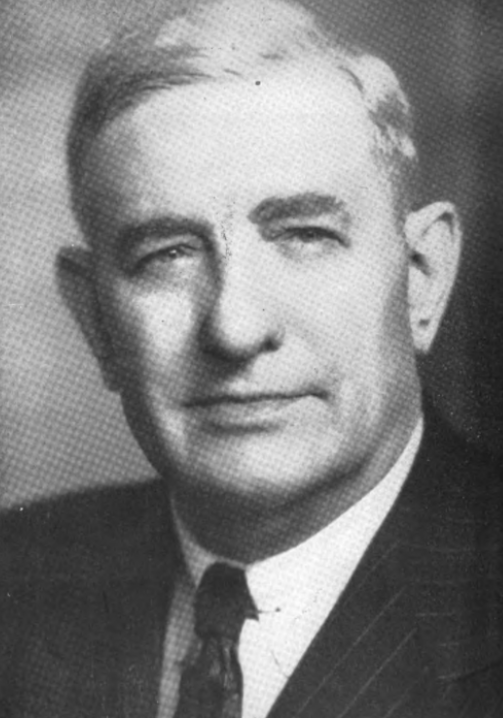

Nominee	Simeon Willis	J. Lyter Donaldson
Party	Republican	Democratic
Popular vote	279,144	270,525
Percentage	50.49%	48.93%
- Willis: 40–50% 50–60% 60–70% 70–80% 80–90% Donaldson: 40–50% 50–60% 60–70% 70–80% 80–90%
Governor before election
Keen Johnson
Democratic
Elected Governor
Simeon Willis
Republican

The 1943 Kentucky gubernatorial election was held on November 2, 1943. Republican nominee Simeon Willis defeated Democratic nominee J. Lyter Donaldson with 50.49% of the vote, becoming the first Republican elected Governor of Kentucky since 1927.

== Primary elections ==
Primary elections were held on August 7, 1943.

=== Democratic primary ===
==== Candidates ====
- J. Lyter Donaldson, former Kentucky Highway Commissioner
- Ben Kilgore, former Executive Secretary of the Kentucky Farm Bureau
- Rodes K. Myers, incumbent Lieutenant Governor
- John J. Thobe

==== Results ====
Primary results by county Donaldson: 30%–40%; 40%–50%; 50%–60%; 60%–70%; 70%–80%; 80%–90%; Kilgore: 40%–50%; 50%–60%; 60%–70%; Myers: 40%–50%; 50%–60%; 60%–70%

Democratic primary results
Party	Candidate	Votes	%
Democratic	J. Lyter Donaldson	135,576	53.56
Democratic	Ben Kilgore	81,027	32.01
Democratic	Rodes K. Myers	34,077	13.46
Democratic	John J. Thobe	2,456	0.97
Total votes		253,136	100.00

== General election ==
=== Candidates ===
Major party candidates

- Simeon Willis, Republican
- J. Lyter Donaldson, Democratic

Other candidates

- Andrew N. Johnson, Prohibition

=== Results ===
1943 Kentucky gubernatorial election
Party	Candidate	Votes	%	±%
Republican	Simeon S. Willis	279,144	50.49	+6.99
Democratic	J. Lyter Donaldson	270,525	48.93	−7.58
Prohibition	Andrew Johnson	3,239	0.59	N/A
Total votes		552,908	100.0	N/A
Republican gain from Democratic				
