= 1942 United States Senate election in Kentucky =

- November 3, 1942
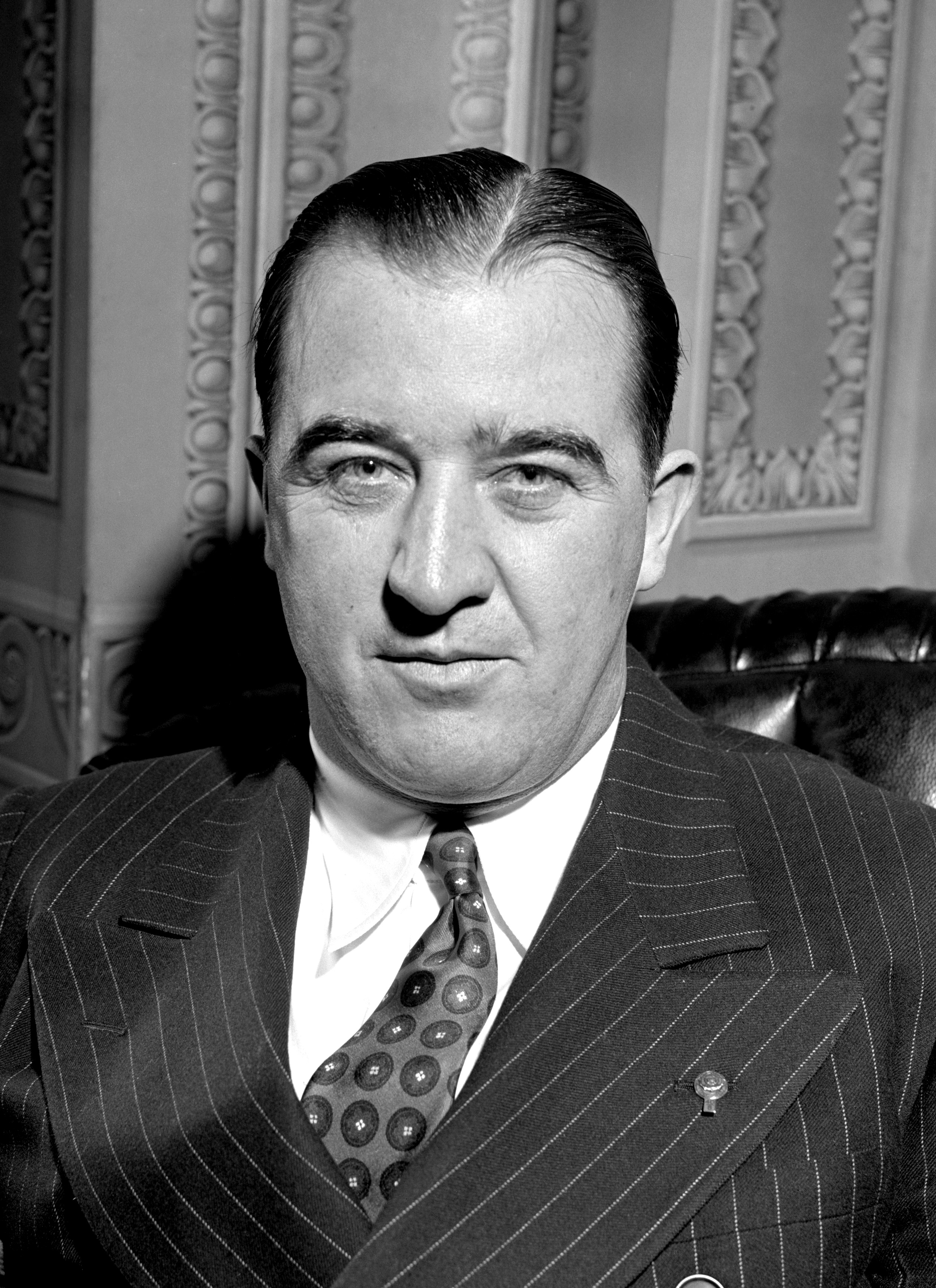

Nominee	Happy Chandler	Richard J. Colbert
Party	Democratic	Republican
Popular vote	216,958	175,081
Percentage	55.34%	44.66%
- County results Chandler: 50–60% 60–70% 70–80% 80–90% Colbert: 50–60% 60–70% 70–80% 80–90%
U.S. senator before election
Happy Chandler
Democratic
Elected U.S. Senator
Happy Chandler
Democratic

The 1942 United States Senate election in Kentucky took place on November 3, 1942. Incumbent Democratic Senator Happy Chandler was re-elected to a full term in office over Republican Richard J. Colbert.

== Primary elections ==
=== Democratic primary ===
==== Candidates ====
- John Y. Brown, Sr., former U.S. Congressmember
- Happy Chandler, incumbent U.S. Senator

==== Results ====
Primary results by county Chandler: 50%–60%; 60%–70%; 70%–80%; 80%–90%; 90%–100%; Brown: 50%–60%

Democratic primary results
Party	Candidate	Votes	%
Democratic	Happy Chandler (incumbent)	134,675	71.81
Democratic	John Y. Brown, Sr.	52,872	28.19
Total votes		187,547	100.00

=== Republican primary ===
==== Candidates ====
- Charles Chandler
- Richard J. Colbert
- G. Tom Hawkins
- Hector Johnson

==== Results ====
Primary results by county Colbert: 30%–40%; 40%–50%; 50%–60%; 60%–70%; 70%–80%; 80%–90%; 90%–100%; Chandler: 30%–40%; 40%–50%; 50%–60%; 60%–70%; Johnson: 30%–40%; 60%–70%; Hawkins: 20%–30%; 30%–40%; 40%–50%; Tie: 40%–50%

Republican primary results
Party	Candidate	Votes	%
Republican	Richard J. Colbert	21,971	50.80
Republican	Charles Chandler	10,988	25.41
Republican	Hector Johnson	5,279	12.21
Republican	G. Tom Hawkins	5,011	11.59
Total votes		43,249	100.00

== General election ==
=== Candidates ===
- Happy Chandler, incumbent Senator since 1939 and former Governor (Democratic)
- Richard J. Colbert, Lexington attorney (Republican)

=== Results ===
1942 U.S. Senate election in Kentucky
Party	Candidate	Votes	%	±%
Democratic	Happy Chandler (incumbent)	216,958	55.34%	
Republican	Richard J. Colbert	175,081	44.66%	
Total votes		392,039	100.00%	
Democratic hold		Swing		

== See also ==
- 1942 United States Senate elections
