= Keen Johnson =

American politician from Kentucky (1896–1970)

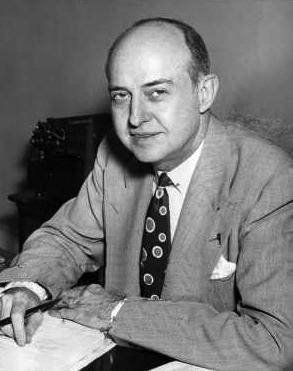
- Official portrait, c. 1946

1st Undersecretary of Labor
- In office 1946–1947
- President: Harry S. Truman
- Preceded by: Office established
- Succeeded by: David A. Morse

45th Governor of Kentucky
- In office October 9, 1939 – December 7, 1943
- Lieutenant: Rodes K. Myers
- Preceded by: Happy Chandler
- Succeeded by: Simeon S. Willis

37th Lieutenant Governor of Kentucky
- In office December 10, 1935 – October 9, 1939
- Governor: Happy Chandler
- Preceded by: Happy Chandler
- Succeeded by: Rodes K. Myers

Personal details
- Born: January 12, 1896 Brandon's Chapel, Kentucky, U.S.
- Died: February 7, 1970 (aged 74) Richmond, Kentucky, U.S.
- Party: Democratic
- Spouse: Eunice Nichols
- Occupation: Journalist

Military service
- Allegiance: United States
- Branch/service: American Expeditionary Force
- Rank: First lieutenant
- Unit: 354th Infantry, 89th Division
- Battles/wars: World War I

Keen Johnson (January 12, 1896 – February 7, 1970) was an American politician who served as the 45th governor of Kentucky, serving from 1939 to 1943; being the only journalist to have held that office. After serving in World War I, Johnson purchased and edited the Elizabethtown Mirror newspaper. He revived the struggling paper, sold it to a competitor and used the profits to obtain his journalism degree from the University of Kentucky in 1922. After graduation, he became editor of The Anderson News, and in 1925, he accepted an offer to co-publish and edit the Richmond Daily Register.

In 1935, the Democratic Party voters of Kentucky chose Johnson as their nominee for lieutenant governor. He ran independently from A. B. "Happy" Chandler, who was elected governor and served from 1935 to 1939, but cooperated with the Chandler administration. Johnson was the Democratic nominee for governor in 1939 when Chandler resigned and elevated Johnson to governor so that Johnson could appoint him to the U.S. Senate seat vacated by the death of M. M. Logan. He went on to win a full gubernatorial term, defeating Republican King Swope. Johnson's desire to expand the state's social services was hampered by the financial strain imposed on the state by the outbreak of World War II. Nevertheless, he ran a fiscally conservative administration and took the state from being $7 million in debt to having a surplus of $10 million by the end of his term.

Following his term as governor, Johnson joined Reynolds Metals as a special assistant to the president. He continued his employment with Reynolds until 1961. He took a year-long leave of absence in 1946 to accept President Harry S. Truman's appointment as the first U.S. Undersecretary of Labor, serving under Lewis B. Schwellenbach. He unsuccessfully ran for a seat in the U.S. Senate in 1960, losing to incumbent Republican John Sherman Cooper. He died February 7, 1970, and was buried in Richmond Cemetery in Richmond, Kentucky.

== Early life ==
Keen Johnson was born in a two-room cabin at Brandon's Chapel in Lyon County, Kentucky, on January 12, 1896. He was the only son of Reverend Robert and Mattie (Holloway) Johnson. His parents named him in honor of John S. Keen, a family friend from Adair County. The Johnsons also had two daughters—Catherine (Keturah) and Christine. Robert Johnson was a Methodist minister, and the family moved often as a result of his occupation.

After completing his elementary education in the public schools, Johnson attended Vanderbilt Preparatory School for Boys, a Methodist institution in Elkton, Kentucky. He finished his preparatory coursework in 1914 and matriculated to Central Methodist College in Fayette, Missouri. He had intended to continue his studies at the University of Missouri School of Journalism, but he interrupted his studies to enlist in the U.S. Army for service in World War I.

After basic training, Johnson entered officer training at Fort Riley on May 15, 1917. In August 1917, he was appointed second lieutenant and assigned to the 354th Infantry, 89th Division of the American Expeditionary Forces at Camp Funston. He was promoted to first lieutenant on March 29, 1918, and on June 4, 1918, he was deployed to France, where he studied logistical communications at the Army School of the Line and the Staff College. He remained in Europe with the American Expeditionary Force until April 1919 and was honorably discharged from the Army on October 31, 1919.

On June 23, 1917, while still completing his military training, Johnson married Eunice Nichols. Their only child, a daughter named Judith, was born May 19, 1927. Upon his return from military service, Johnson purchased the Elizabethtown Mirror with financial assistance from his father. He built the struggling paper almost from the ground up, and a competitor soon bought him out for a profit. Johnson used the profit from the sale of the Mirror to continue his education at the University of Kentucky. While a student, he worked as a reporter for the Lexington Herald. He received his Bachelor of Arts degree in journalism in 1922. The university awarded him an honorary Doctor of Laws degree in 1940.

After graduation, Johnson purchased half-ownership of The Anderson News and served as the paper's editor and publisher. In 1925, Shelton M. Saufley asked Johnson to enter into a joint venture to purchase the Richmond Daily Register. Lured by the idea of publishing a daily paper, Johnson accepted. As a result of one of his editorials, Johnson was named executive secretary of the State Democratic Central Committee in 1932. He continued to hold this position and publish the Register through 1939.

== Political career ==
In 1935, Johnson was one of three contenders for the Democratic nomination for lieutenant governor. In the primary, he received more votes than his opponents, J. E. Wise and B. F. Wright, but a newly enacted election law required a runoff if no candidate received a majority. On Sept. 7, Johnson defeated Wise in the runoff.

In the gubernatorial primary, A. B. "Happy" Chandler defeated Tom Rhea, the candidate favored by Gov. Ruby Laffoon. Johnson had also favored Rhea, and had backed Robert T. Crowe over J. C. W. Beckham, Chandler's choice in the 1927 Democratic primary. Nevertheless, the two put aside their differences. Chandler defeated Republican King Swope by over 95,000 votes, and Johnson defeated J. J. Kavanaugh by over 100,000 votes.

=== Governor of Kentucky ===
The division between Chandler and Laffoon led to factionalism within the state Democratic Party. When no strong gubernatorial candidate emerged from the Chandler faction in 1939, Chandler threw his support behind Johnson. John Y. Brown, Sr. announced he would challenge Johnson in the primary. This solidified the Chandler faction's support, as Brown was an outspoken critic of the Chandler administration. Brown gained the support of Chandler critics, notably Laffoon, U.S. Sen. Alben Barkley, Rhea and his 1935 campaign manager, Union County Judge Earle C. Clements. He further garnered the support of the United Mine Workers and their president, John L. Lewis. It was to no avail, as Johnson defeated Brown in the primary by a vote of 270,731 (52%) to 236,734 (46%).

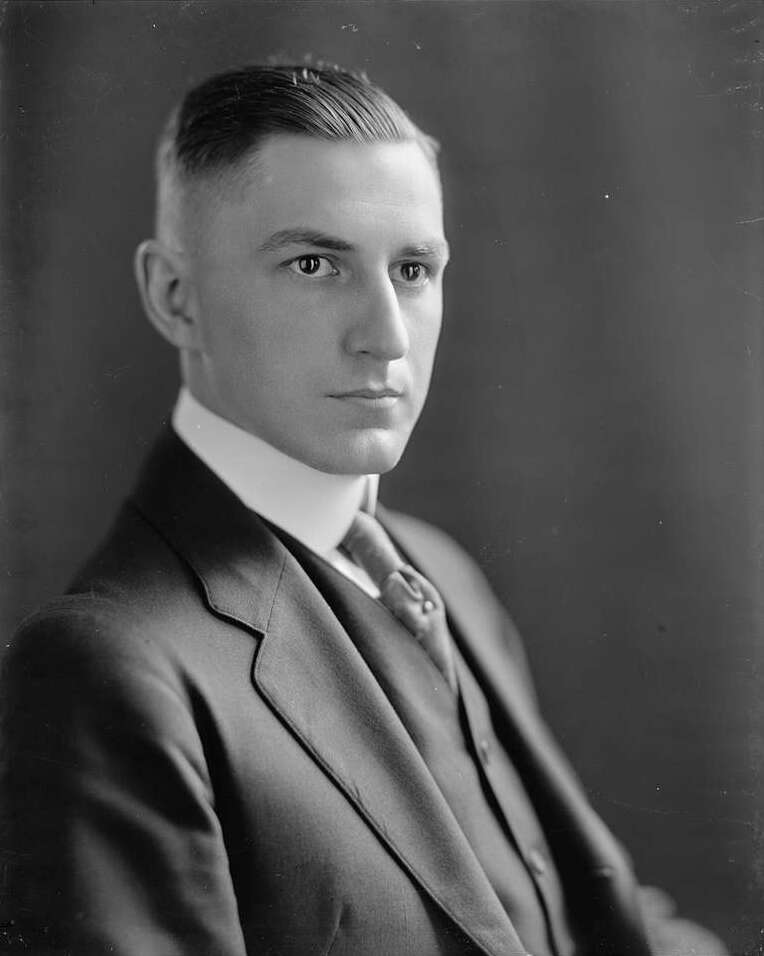
King Swope, Johnson's opponent in the 1939 gubernatorial election

The Republicans renominated King Swope, the loser to Chandler in 1935. In the middle of the campaign, Johnson was elevated to governor because U.S. Sen. M. M. Logan died in October, and Chandler resigned the governorship so that Johnson, thus elevated to governor, could appoint him to the vacant seat. In the general election on Nov. 7, Johnson defeated Swope 460,834 (57%) to 354,704 (43%).

In his inaugural address, Johnson promised to be "a saving, thrifty, frugal governor". His policies helped him eliminate the state's debt of $7 million and left the treasury with a surplus of $10 million by the end of his term. It was the first time the state had had a surplus since the administration of J. C. W. Beckham in 1903. Johnson achieved the surplus without enacting any tax increases. Not all in Johnson's party were happy with his approach to governing; one critic noted, "Old Keen frugaled here and frugaled there till he damn near frugaled us to death."

Louisville Courier-Journal reporter Howard Henderson wrote several stories exposing corruption in Johnson's administration, including a significant one dealing with laundry contracts. Hubert Meredith, Johnson's politically ambitious attorney general, freely aired his concerns about the administration, gaining recognition for himself from the publicity generated. Historian James C. Klotter opined "It is doubtful whether Johnson's administration had any more political scandal than others, but the publicity made it seem that way."

In the 1940 legislative session, Johnson successfully lobbied the General Assembly to allocate money to a teacher retirement system that had previously been authorized but left unfunded. Despite his fiscally conservative nature, he increased funds to programs to assist the elderly by $1 million per year. Other accomplishments of the session included the provision of pensions for justices on the Kentucky Court of Appeals, creation of soil conservation districts in the state, and banning the sale of marijuana.

Johnson's primary interest lay in improving the state's mental and penal institutions. These improvements began under Governor Chandler, and while Johnson stated that the mental hospitals and prisons were in their best condition in forty years by the end of his term, he was disappointed that he was not able to do more. In light of the financial obligations brought about by World War II, he had to curb state construction.

In the 1941 legislative session, Johnson vetoed a measure allowing the sale of alcoholic beverages to surrounding states, even those with laws forbidding alcohol sales. The bill was very popular, and was supported by many of the state's powerful special interests. It had passed the Kentucky House of Representatives by a vote of 84–0 and the Kentucky Senate by a vote of 31–3. After Johnson's veto, the House reversed itself, voting 86–3 to sustain the veto.

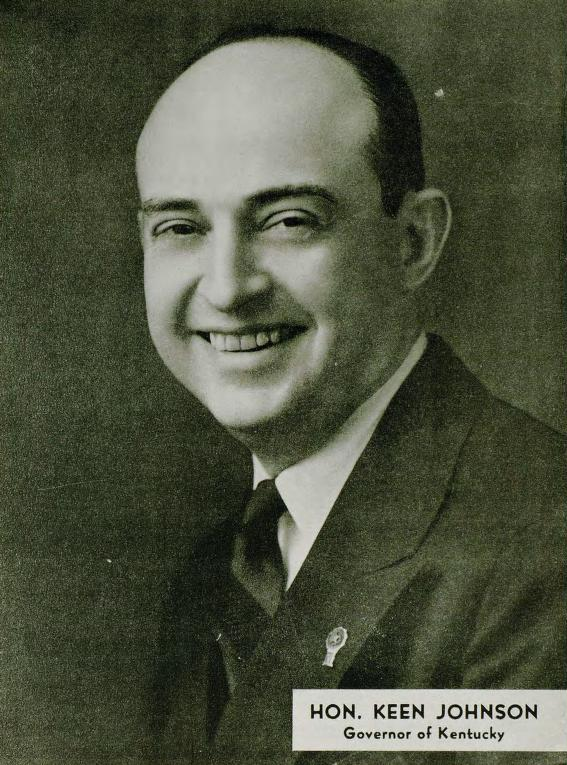
Johnson, c. 1942

In the 1942 legislative session, Johnson stressed the importance of allowing Kentucky cities to purchase and distribute power from the Tennessee Valley Authority. In an address to the Assembly, Johnson declared, "I have never had a stronger conviction on a question of public policy... The principle involved is as correct as the Ten Commandments." The Assembly passed the necessary legislation as Johnson requested.

A major accomplishment of the Johnson administration was the passage of a legislative redistricting bill. Despite the fact that the U.S. Constitution requires redistricting after every decennial census, Kentucky's legislative districts had remained virtually unchanged between 1893 and 1941. He asked the 1942 legislative session to adjourn early so he could call a special session for the sole purpose of considering a redistricting bill. The legislators obliged, and passed a bill by the end of the special session.

Various labor measures were also advocated by Johnson and passed during his time as governor.

Johnson took an active part in the Democratic gubernatorial primary in 1943. Among the candidates were Ben Kilgore, Rodes K. Myers, and J. Lyter Donaldson. Myers was Johnson's lieutenant governor, but he had turned on the administration. Johnson called him a carpetbagger from North Carolina, "a political adventurer", and "a phony farmer". He also ridiculed Kilgore, who had strong support from the Louisville Courier-Journal, the Rural Electric Association, and the Farm Bureau, by calling him a "Casanova". Donaldson, Johnson's former campaign manager, secured his support and the Democratic nomination. He was defeated in the general election by Republican Simeon Willis.

== Later life and death ==
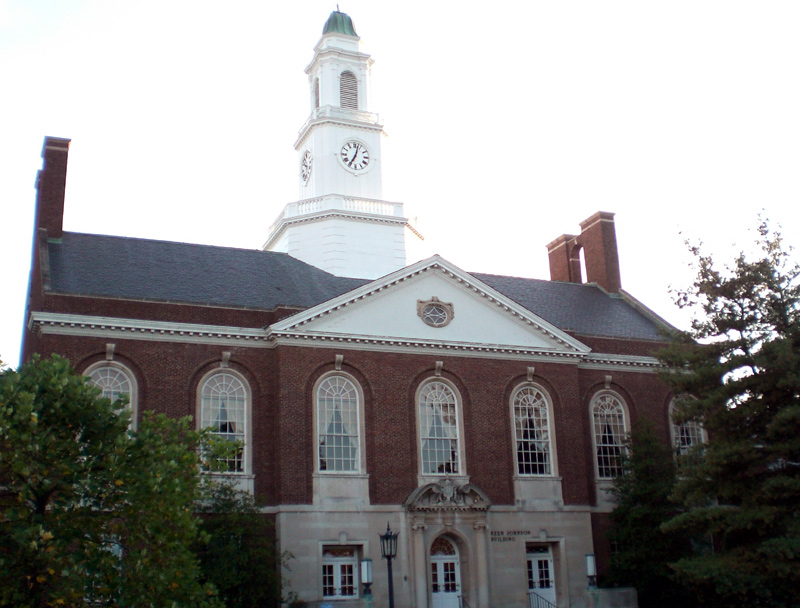
Keen Johnson Building at Eastern Kentucky University

Beginning in 1940, Johnson was Kentucky's committeeman on the Democratic National Committee, serving until 1948. He continued his service on the Board of Regents of Eastern Kentucky State Teachers' College (now Eastern Kentucky University), to which Chandler had appointed him in 1936. When his term expired in 1940, there was some question whether Johnson could reappoint himself. In 1942, while he and Lt. Gov. Rodes Myers were out of the state, making Senate President Edwin P. Dawson acting governor, Dawson reappointed Johnson to the board. Johnson also served on the board from 1954 to 1958. Eastern's Keen Johnson Building, a 1939 Works Progress Administration project, was named in honor of him. The building, with a clock tower, is one of the most recognizable landmarks on the university's campus. On January 1, 1944, he was named a special assistant to the president of Reynolds Metals, advising him on postwar unemployment problems. He became vice-president of public relations for the company in 1945.

Johnson developed a strong rapport with union leaders and in 1946, President Harry S. Truman and U.S. Sen. Alben Barkley asked him to accept an appointment to the newly created post of Undersecretary of Labor. In August 1946, Johnson took a leave of absence from Reynolds and accepted the appointment. He frequently attended President Truman's cabinet meetings due to the illness of Secretary Lewis B. Schwellenbach. In mid-1947, Johnson returned to Reynolds. In 1950, he became a member of the company's board of directors. In this capacity, he organized meetings of sales executives and traveled extensively to promote the company's aluminum products. He retired from Reynolds in January 1961.

In 1954, Johnson considered running for governor in 1955 at the behest of Gov. Lawrence Wetherby and Sen. Earle Clements, but decided to stay at Reynolds. In 1960, Johnson sought a seat in the U.S. Senate. He defeated John Y. Brown, Sr. in the Democratic primary, but was unable to unseat Republican incumbent John Sherman Cooper in the general election. losing by a vote of 59% to 41%, In 1961 and 1964, he was appointed to the state board of education. He served as a delegate (with all living former governors) to an assembly to revise the state constitution in 1964. In 1965, the University of Kentucky honored him with a Centennial Award and inducted him into its Hall of Distinguished Alumni. He died February 7, 1970, in Richmond, Kentucky, and is buried in Richmond Cemetery.

Political offices
Preceded by Happy Chandler	Governor of Kentucky; 1939–1943	Succeeded by Simeon S. Willis
Preceded by Happy Chandler	Lieutenant Governor of Kentucky; 1935–1939	Succeeded by Rodes K. Myers
Party political offices
Preceded by Happy Chandler	Democratic nominee for Governor of Kentucky; 1939	Succeeded by J. Lyter Donaldson
Preceded by Happy Chandler	Democratic nominee for Lieutenant Governor of Kentucky; 1935	Succeeded by Rodes K. Myers
Preceded by Lawrence Wetherby	Democratic nominee for U.S. senator from Kentucky (Class 2); 1960	Succeeded by John Y. Brown, Sr.
