= John A. Whitaker =

American politician (1901–1951)

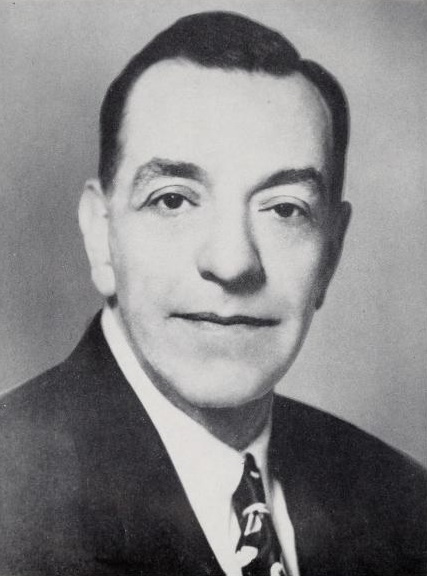

Member of the U.S. House of Representatives from Kentucky's 2nd district
- In office April 17, 1948 – December 15, 1951
- Preceded by: Earle Clements
- Succeeded by: Garrett Withers

Attorney of Logan County, Kentucky
- In office 1928–1948

Personal details
- Born: John Albert Whitaker; October 31, 1901 Russellville, Kentucky, U.S.
- Died: December 15, 1951 (aged 50) Russellville, Kentucky, U.S.
- Resting place: Maple Grove Cemetery, Russellville, Kentucky, U.S.
- Party: Democratic
- Relatives: Addison James (grandfather)
- Education: Bethel College; University of Kentucky
- Profession: Politician, lawyer

John Albert Whitaker (October 31, 1901 – December 15, 1951) was a U.S. representative from Kentucky.

Whitaker was born in Russellville, Kentucky. He attended the public schools, Bethel College, and the University of Kentucky. He later studied law, attained admitted to the bar in 1926, and commenced practice in Russellville.

He was Logan County Attorney from 1928 to 1948, and a delegate to all the State Democratic conventions from 1924 to 1950.

Whitaker was elected as a Democrat to the Eightieth Congress to fill the vacancy caused by the resignation of Earle C. Clements, who was elected governor in November 1947. He was reelected to the Eighty-first and Eighty-second Congresses and served from April 17, 1948, until his death in Russellville, Kentucky, December 15, 1951.

He was interred in Russellville's Maple Grove Cemetery.

Whitaker was the grandson of Addison James, who also served in Congress.

== See also ==
- List of members of the United States Congress who died in office (1950–1999)

U.S. House of Representatives
Preceded by Earle C. Clements	Member of the U.S. House of Representatives from Kentucky's 2nd congressional district April 17, 1948 – December 15, 1951	Succeeded by Garrett L. Withers
