= 1939 Kentucky gubernatorial election =

- November 7, 1939
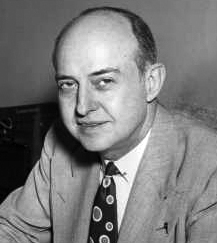

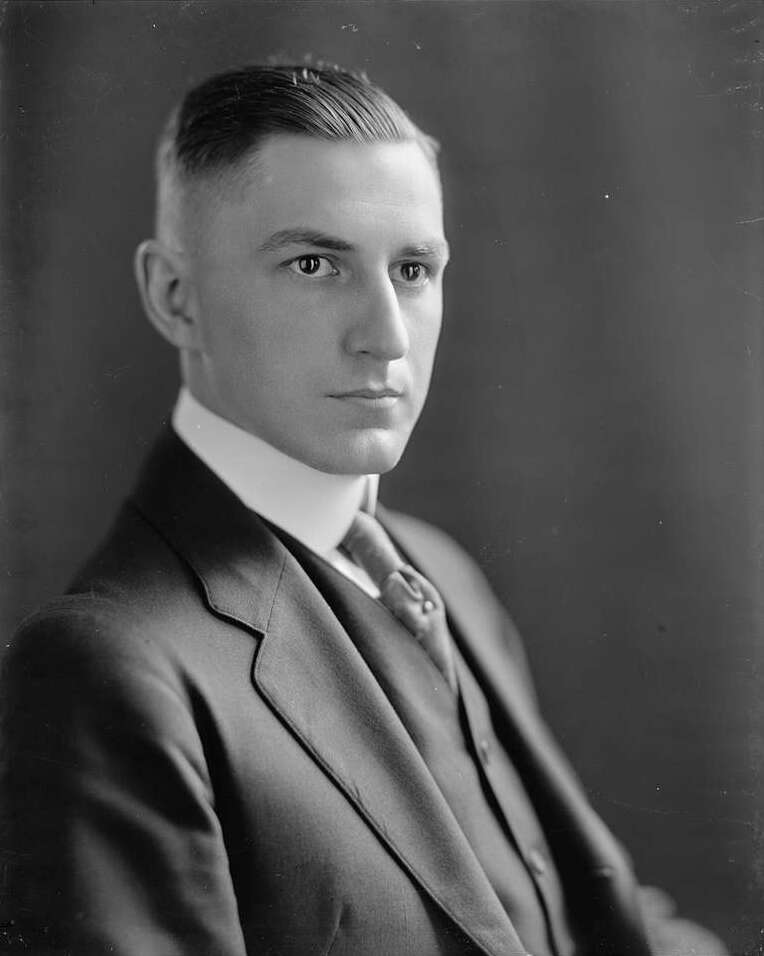
Nominee	Keen Johnson	King Swope
Party	Democratic	Republican
Popular vote	460,834	354,704
Percentage	56.51%	43.49%
- Johnson: 50–60% 60–70% 70–80% 80–90% Swope: 50–60% 60–70% 70–80% 80–90%
Governor before election
Keen Johnson
Democratic
Elected Governor
Keen Johnson
Democratic

The 1939 Kentucky gubernatorial election was held on November 7, 1939. Incumbent Democrat Keen Johnson defeated Republican nominee King Swope with 56.51% of the vote.

== Primary elections ==
Primary elections were held on August 5, 1939.

=== Democratic primary ===
==== Candidates ====
- Keen Johnson, incumbent Lieutenant Governor
- John Y. Brown Sr., former U.S. Representative
- Charles D. Arnett
- Ulysses G. Foster

==== Results ====
Primary results by county Johnson: 40%–50%; 50%–60%; 60%–70%; 70%–80%; Brown: 40%–50%; 50%–60%; 60%–70%; 70%–80%

Democratic primary results
Party	Candidate	Votes	%
Democratic	Keen Johnson	270,731	52.47
Democratic	John Y. Brown Sr.	236,734	45.88
Democratic	Charles D. Arnett	6,802	1.32
Democratic	Ulysses G. Foster	1,754	0.34
Total votes		516,021	100.00

=== Republican primary ===
==== Candidates ====
- King Swope, former U.S. Representative
- John Sherman Cooper, former State Representative
- L. O. Smith
- G. Tom Hawkins

==== Results ====
Primary results by county Swope: 40%–50%; 50%–60%; 60%–70%; 70%–80%; 80%–90%; 90%–100%; Cooper: 50%–60%; 60%–70%; 70%–80%; 90%–100%; Other: 40%–50%

Republican primary results
Party	Candidate	Votes	%
Republican	King Swope	121,297	59.46
Republican	John Sherman Cooper	73,305	35.94
Republican	L. O. Smith	7,187	3.52
Republican	G. Tom Hawkins	2,195	1.08
Total votes		203,984	100.00

== General election ==
=== Candidates ===
- Keen Johnson, Democratic
- King Swope, Republican

=== Results ===
1939 Kentucky gubernatorial election
Party	Candidate	Votes	%	±%
Democratic	Keen Johnson (incumbent)	460,834	56.51	+2.05
Republican	King Swope	354,704	43.49	−1.65
Total votes		815,538	100.0	N/A
Democratic hold				
