= Rodes K. Myers =

American politician

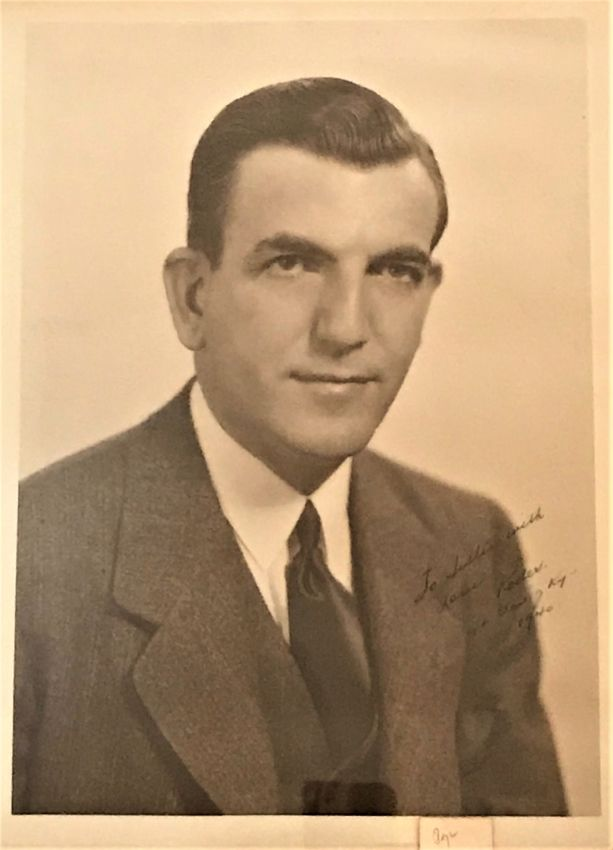
- Myers in 1940

38th Lieutenant Governor of Kentucky
- In office December 12, 1939 – December 7, 1943
- Governor: Keen Johnson
- Preceded by: Keen Johnson
- Succeeded by: Kenneth H. Tuggle

Personal details
- Born: June 29, 1900; Bowling Green, Kentucky
- Died: March 11, 1960 (aged 59); Nashville, Tennessee
- Political party: Democratic

Rodes Kirby Myers (June 29, 1900 – March 11, 1960) was an American politician who served as the 38th lieutenant governor of Kentucky 1939 to 1943.

Myers' hometown was Bowling Green, Kentucky. Myers was a Kentucky delegate to the Democratic National Convention in 1936, 1940, 1944, 1948 and 1956.

In 1939 Myers ran for Lieutenant Governor of Kentucky and won, serving 1939–43. Myers ran for Governor of Kentucky in 1943 but lost in the Democratic primary to J. Lyter Donaldson, who in turn lost to Republican Simeon S. Willis.

Myers died in 1960 and is buried at Fairview Cemetery in Bowling Green, Kentucky.

Political offices
Preceded by Keen Johnson	Lieutenant Governor of Kentucky; 1939–1943	Succeeded by Kenneth H. Tuggle
Party political offices
Preceded by Keen Johnson	Democratic nominee for Lieutenant Governor of Kentucky; 1935	Succeeded by William H. May
