= Richmond Register =

- Type: Daily newspaper
- Format: Broadsheet
- Owner: Community Newspaper Holdings Inc.
- Publisher: Mark Walker
- Editor: Steve Cornelius
- Founded: 1917
- Headquarters: 1212 W. Main Street; Richmond, Kentucky 40475
- Circulation: 4,419 Daily
- Website: richmondregister.com

The Richmond Register is a tri-weekly daily newspaper based in Richmond, Kentucky, and covering Madison County. It publishes Tuesday, Thursday and Saturday. The Register is owned by Community Newspaper Holdings Inc.

== History ==
As the only surviving daily in Richmond, the Register is heir to a crowded field. The Globe Register debuted November 2, 1809, but lasted only a year before changing its name to The Luminary, which in turn was sold and became The Farmer's Chronicle in 1822. In 1845, the name changed to The Whig Chronicle; and in 1852 it became The Weekly Messenger, the largest circulated newspaper in Kentucky outside Louisville. The paper ended its run in 1862, presumably due to the onset of the American Civil War.

The story of today's Register began in 1917, when S. M. Saufley purchased two Richmond papers, The Climax and The Kentucky Register, and founded The Richmond Daily Register. The Saufley, Johnson and Challinor-Tureman families took turns as owners, publishers and general managers of the paper until 1970, when Frank Helderman Sr. bought it. His wife sold to Thomson Corporation in 1985, and Thomson yielded to American Publishing, part of Hollinger International, in 1995. The Register is now published by CNHI, which bought it in 1999.

The paper removed the word "Daily" from its name in June 1978 (perhaps to acknowledge the lack of a Sunday edition) when the paper was sold to Richmond Publishing Corporation (the entity that ran the paper until the sale to Thomson) and moved from its old downtown offices on Water Street to 380 Big Hill Avenue (which was formerly a Coca-Cola bottling plant), where it remained for approximately 45 years. In November, 2023, the paper's offices relocated to 1212 W. Main Street, in the office complex shared by Edward D. Jones.

For most of the paper's life (prior to the sale to CNHI), it was published six days a week: Monday through Friday weekday afternoons, and Saturday mornings. During the late 1990s or early 2000s, the 'weekend' paper began to be published on Sundays instead of Saturdays, maintaining the long-standing six-day frequency. As the 2000s wore on, though, declines in the newspaper business in general led to a gradual decrease in publication frequency (beginning with the elimination of Mondays in 2013), to the current frequency of three times per week.
