= Garrett Withers =

American politician (1884–1953)

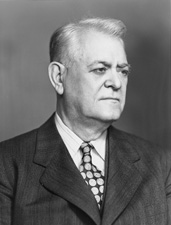

Member of the U.S. House of Representatives from Kentucky's 2nd district
- In office August 2, 1952 – April 30, 1953
- Preceded by: John A. Whitaker
- Succeeded by: William Natcher

Member of the Kentucky House of Representatives from the 13th district
- In office January 1, 1952 – August 2, 1952
- Preceded by: Archie R. Moore
- Succeeded by: J. Murray Blue

United States Senator from Kentucky
- In office January 20, 1949 – November 26, 1950
- Appointed by: Earle Clements
- Preceded by: Alben W. Barkley
- Succeeded by: Earle Clements

Commissioner of the Kentucky Department of Highways
- In office December 10, 1947 – January 17, 1949
- Appointed by: Earle Clements
- Preceded by: J. Stephen Watkins
- Succeeded by: John A. Keck

Personal details
- Born: Garrett Lee Withers; June 21, 1884 Clay, Kentucky, U.S.
- Died: April 30, 1953 (aged 68) Bethesda, Maryland, U.S.
- Party: Democratic

Garrett Lee Withers (June 21, 1884 – April 30, 1953) was an American politician and lawyer. As a Democrat, he represented Kentucky in the United States Senate and United States House of Representatives.

Withers was born on a farm in Webster County, Kentucky. He was admitted to the bar in 1908 and was a practicing attorney in Webster County from 1911 to 1953. He was elected clerk of Webster County Circuit Court and served from 1910 to 1912, and later as a master commissioner from 1913 to 1917. He was an unsuccessful candidate for the Democratic nomination for state treasurer on Alben Barkley's slate in 1923. He was a district member of the Kentucky Highway Commission from 1932 to 1936; as a Referee in Bankruptcy from 1941 to 1945; and as an appointed commissioner for the Kentucky Department of Highways from 1947 to 1949 under Gov. Earle C. Clements.

On January 20, 1949, Clements appointed Withers to the United States Senate to fill the vacancy caused by the resignation of Alben W. Barkley to become Vice President of the United States, with the agreement that he would not seek election to the unexpired term in a special election or the six-year regular term in November 1950. Clements was elected to both terms and succeeded Withers on Nov. 27, 1950.

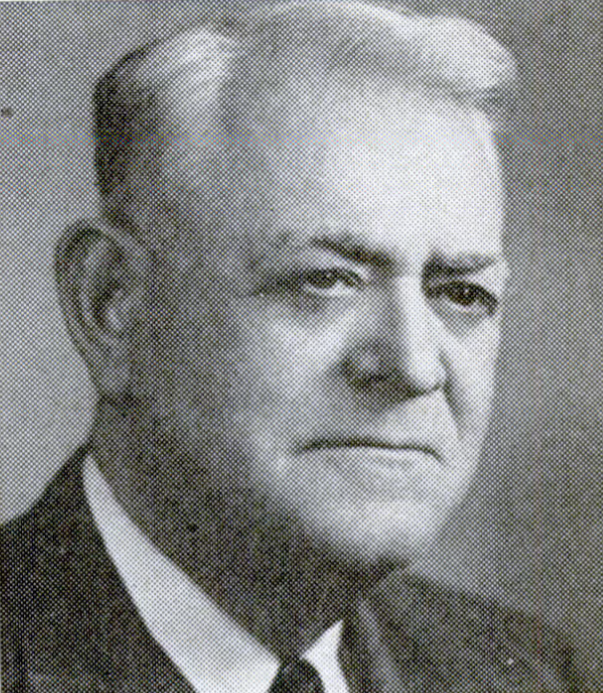
Withers as a congressman, published in the 1953 pictorial directory.

Withers won election to the Kentucky House of Representatives in 1951 and then won a special election (due to the death of Rep. John A. Whitaker) on August 2, 1952, to the United States House of Representatives. He served as a Democrat in the Eighty-second Congress and was reelected to the Eighty-third Congress. He died in the naval hospital at Bethesda, Maryland, on April 30, 1953.

== See also ==
- List of members of the United States Congress who died in office (1950–1999)

U.S. Senate
Preceded by Alben W. Barkley	United States Senator (Class 3) from Kentucky; January 20, 1949 – November 26, 1950	Succeeded by Earle C. Clements
U.S. House of Representatives
Preceded by John A. Whitaker	U.S. Representative, Kentucky 2nd District; August 2, 1952 – April 30, 1953	Succeeded by William Huston Natcher
