= 1948 Louisiana gubernatorial election =

1948 Louisiana Democratic gubernatorial primary
- February 24, 1948
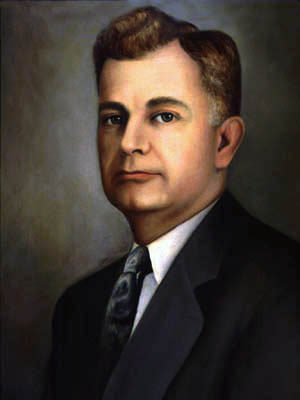

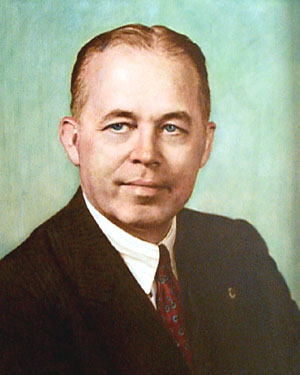
Nominee	Earl Long	Sam H. Jones
Party	Democratic	Democratic
Alliance	Longite	Anti-Long
Popular vote	432,528	223,971
Percentage	65.88%	34.12%
- Parish results Long: 50–60% 60–70% 70–80% 80–90% >90% Jones: 50–60% 60–70%
Governor before election
Jimmie Davis
Democratic
Elected Governor
Earl Long
Democratic

The 1948 Louisiana gubernatorial election was decided by a Democratic primary held in two rounds on January 20 and February 24, 1948, which was tantamount to election. The 1948 election saw the defeat of Louisiana's reformer "anti-Long" faction and the election of Earl Kemp Long to his first full term as governor.

== Background ==
Like most Southern states between the Reconstruction Era and the Civil Rights Movement, Louisiana's Republican Party was virtually nonexistent in terms of electoral support. This meant that the two Democratic Party primaries held on these dates were the real contest over who would be governor.

Under Louisiana's constitution, incumbent governor Jimmie Davis could not succeed himself in a consecutive term.

== Democratic primary ==
=== Candidates ===
- Sam H. Jones, former Governor (1940–44)
- Robert F. Kennon, judge and former Mayor of Minden
- Earl Long, former Governor (1939–40)
- Jimmy Morrison, U.S. Representative from Hammond

=== Campaign ===
Louisiana's reformist anti-Long faction supported Sam H. Jones, who had been governor from 1940 to 1944. Jones was endorsed by outgoing Governor Davis and high-profile Louisiana politicians, such as Senator John H. Overton and Mayor deLesseps Story Morrison Sr. of New Orleans, who controlled the city's powerful Crescent City Democratic Association. Jones's reform campaign was weakened by reminders of unethical deals and heavy-handed political tactics in his previous term and by the electorate's lack of enthusiasm for reform governors after eight years.

Sam Jones's main opponent was Long, who had been governor in 1939–40 and the inheritor of his brother Huey Long's Longite political faction. Funded by politicians, oil and gas money, and contributions from organized crime in the New Orleans area, Long ran a theatrical and entertaining campaign, making stump speeches that were a mix of political harangue and humorous anecdotes. His platform called for the elimination of Jones's civil service, the doubling of state spending on programs like pensions, school lunches, charity hospitals and asylums, new trade schools, pay increases for teachers, an increased homestead tax exemption, and bonuses for veterans of World War II. Through payoffs and promises of support, Long managed to gain the backing of powerful former enemies, State Senator Dudley LeBlanc, former Governor Jimmie Noe, and U.S. Representative F. Edward Hebert.

Prior to the election New Orleans crime family boss Carlos Marcello surreptitiously gave Long $10,000 and another $100,000 following his victory.

Robert F. Kennon drew most of his support from North Louisiana and reformers disillusioned with Jones. Jimmy Morrison (no relation to Mayor Morrison) was supported by former New Orleans mayor Robert Maestri and his Old Regular political machine and finished in fourth place.

=== Results ===
Jimmy Morrison was able to carry East Baton Rouge and several parishes in vicinity of his home region. Kennon won Shreveport's Caddo Parish and attracted some support in the rest of northern Louisiana. Support from deLesseps Morrison's machine allowed Jones to win in New Orleans, and respectable support from sections of the rest of the state sent him into the runoff round with Long. But Long's victories in most parishes in both northern and southern parts of the state gave him a commanding lead going into the second round.

1948 Democratic gubernatorial primary
Party	Candidate	Votes	%
Democratic	Earl K. Long	267,253	41.51%
Democratic	Sam H. Jones	147,329	22.88%
Democratic	Robert F. Kennon	127,569	19.81%
Democratic	Jimmy Morrison	101,754	15.80%
Total votes		643,905	100.00%

=== Runoff ===
In the runoff, the Old Regulars threw their support behind Long. With his longtime enemies were supporting Long, Mayor Morrison stepped up his campaigning for Jones and began a feud with Long that would last until Long's death in 1960.

The runoff election saw Long elected to the governor's office with an overwhelming majority. Of Louisiana's 64 parishes, only East Baton Rouge and West Feliciana went for Jones. Jones even lost his home base of Calcasieu Parish. He did not seek the governorship again.

1948 Democratic gubernatorial runoff
Party	Candidate	Votes	%
Democratic	Earl K. Long	432,528	65.88%
Democratic	Sam H. Jones	223,971	34.12%
Total votes		656,499	100.00%
