= The Anderson News =

- Type: Weekly newspaper
- Owner(s): Paxton Media Group
- Founded: 1877
- Headquarters: 504 W Broadway, Suite D Lawrenceburg, KY
- Website: https://www.pmg-ky1.com/the_anderson_news/

The Anderson News is a weekly newspaper, founded in 1877, serving Lawrenceburg, Kentucky and the rest of Anderson County, Kentucky.

It is published on Wednesdays and has a circulation of approximately 6,000, with a Monday advertising supplement called The Anderson News Extra, featuring display advertising and local and syndicated news content, with a circulation of 11,500.

In 2021, Landmark Media Enterprises sold the newspaper to Paxton Media Group.
