= Eldon S. Dummit =

American politician

Eldon Dummit

34th Attorney General of Kentucky
- In office January 3, 1944 – January 5, 1948
- Governor: Simeon Willis; Earle Clements
- Preceded by: Hubert Meredith
- Succeeded by: Alvarado E. Funk

Personal details
- Born: Eldon Steven Dummit; August 6, 1896 Missouri, U.S.
- Died: May 4, 1973 (aged 76)
- Party: Republican
- Education: University of Kentucky (LLB)

Eldon Steven Dummit (August 6, 1896 – May 4, 1973) was an American politician and attorney from Kentucky. He served as the 34th Attorney General of Kentucky and was the Republican nominee for Governor of Kentucky in 1947.

== Early life and education ==
Dummit was born and raised on a farm in southwest Missouri. He graduated from high school in Monett, Missouri before attending Drury College in Springfield, Missouri. He earned a Bachelor of Laws from the University of Kentucky College of Law.

== Career ==
After graduating from law school, Dummit worked as a legal instructor at the University of Tennessee College of Law. In 1921, he established a legal practice in Lexington, Kentucky. A member of the Republican Party of Kentucky, Dummit served as the 34th Attorney General of Kentucky from 1944 to 1948.

=== 1947 gubernatorial election ===
Dummit was nominated to succeed Simeon Willis, the last Republican governor of Kentucky since Flem D. Sampson. Dummit's opponent in 1947 was Earle Clements, a former member of the Kentucky House of Representatives who was then representing Kentucky in the United States House of Representatives. Dummit was also the last Republican to be the Attorney General of Kentucky until Daniel Cameron, the state's first African American attorney general, was elected in 2019.

Clements defeated Dummit, taking 387,795 votes (57.4%) to Dummit's 287,756 (42.6%). Clements went on to serve in the United States Senate after serving as governor, and Kentucky did not elect another Republican governor until Louie Nunn in 1967.

== External sources ==
- The Kentucky Encyclopedia

Legal offices
Preceded by Hubert Meredith	Attorney General of Kentucky; 1944–1948	Succeeded by Alvarado E. Funk
Party political offices
Preceded by Simeon S. Willis	Republican nominee for Governor of Kentucky; 1947	Succeeded by Eugene Siler
