= J. Lyter Donaldson =

American politician

Joseph Lyter Donaldson (April 10, 1891 – March 27, 1960) was the Democratic nominee for Governor of Kentucky in 1943. Donaldson, of Carrollton, Kentucky served as state highway commissioner. In the 1943 Democratic primary for governor Donaldson defeated Rodes K. Myers, the incumbent Lieutenant Governor of Kentucky, and Ben Kilgore. Donaldson, however, proved to be a lackluster candidate in the general election. Although no Republican had won that office since the height of national Republican strength in 1927, before the Great Depression, Donaldson lost the general election to Republican Simeon S. Willis, 279,144 to 270,525, with 3,239 votes going to the Prohibition Party candidate.

Party political offices
| Preceded by Keen Johnson | Democratic nominee for Governor of Kentucky; 1943 | Succeeded by Earle C. Clements |
