= 1982 Kentucky elections =

A general election was held in the U.S. state of Kentucky on November 2, 1982. The primary election for all offices was held on May 25, 1982.

== Federal offices ==
=== United States House of Representatives ===
In 1982, Kentucky had seven congressional districts, electing four Democrats and three Republicans.

== State offices ==
=== Kentucky Supreme Court ===
1982 Kentucky Supreme Court elections
- November 2, 1982

4 of the 7 districts of the Kentucky Supreme Court

The Kentucky Supreme Court consists of seven justices elected in non-partisan elections to staggered eight-year terms. Districts 1, 2, 4, and 6 were up for election in 1982.

==== District 1 ====
1982 Kentucky Supreme Court 1st district election
- District 1
Candidate	Roy N. Vance	Boyce G. Clayton
Popular vote	27,714	21,259
Percentage	56.59%	43.41%
- County results Vance: 50–60% 60–70% 70–80% 80–90% Clayton: 50–60% 70–80%
Justice before election
Boyce G. Clayton
Elected Justice
Roy N. Vance

===== Primary election =====
Primary results
Candidate	Votes	%
Roy N. Vance	8,149	44.56
Boyce G. Clayton (incumbent)	5,490	30.02
Bill Paxton	4,649	25.42
Total votes	18,288	100.0

===== General election =====
1982 Kentucky Supreme Court 1st district election
Candidate	Votes	%
Roy N. Vance	27,714	56.59
Boyce G. Clayton (incumbent)	21,259	43.41
Write-in	4	0.01
Total votes	48,977	100.0

==== District 2 ====
1982 Kentucky Supreme Court 2nd district election
- District 2
Candidate	William Gant
Popular vote	18,301
Percentage	100.0%
Justice before election
John S. Palmore
Elected Justice
William Gant

===== General election =====
1982 Kentucky Supreme Court 2nd district election
Candidate	Votes	%
William Gant	18,301	99.95
Write-in	9	0.05
Total votes	18,310	100.0

==== District 4 ====
1982 Kentucky Supreme Court 4th district election
- District 4
Candidate	Charles M. Leibson	Edwin A. Schroering Jr.
Popular vote	79,953	67,451
Percentage	54.24%	45.76%
Justice before election
Marvin J. Sternberg
Elected Justice
Charles M. Leibson

===== Primary election =====
Primary results
Candidate	Votes	%
Charles M. Leibson	26,356	24.36
Edwin A. Schroering Jr.	23,784	21.98
Joseph H. Eckert	19,713	18.22
Jack E. Mudd	15,268	14.11
Charles H. Anderson	10,204	9.43
Richard C. Oldham	5,471	5.06
Henry Armstrong Triplett	4,916	4.54
John K. Stiles	2,477	2.29
Total votes	108,189	100.0

===== General election =====
1982 Kentucky Supreme Court 4th district election
Candidate	Votes	%
Charles M. Leibson	79,953	54.24
Edwin A. Schroering Jr.	67,451	45.76
Total votes	147,404	100.0

==== District 6 ====
1982 Kentucky Supreme Court 6th district election
- District 6
Candidate	Donald C. Wintersheimer	John J. O'Hara
Popular vote	42,734	36,077
Percentage	54.22%	45.78%
- County results Wintersheimer: 50–60% 60–70% O'Hara: 50–60% 60–70%
Justice before election
John J. O'Hara
Elected Justice
Donald C. Wintersheimer

===== Primary election =====
Primary results
Candidate	Votes	%
Donald C. Wintersheimer	11,077	39.03
John J. O'Hara (incumbent)	9,068	31.95
Tim Nolan	8,235	29.02
Total votes	28,380	100.0

===== General election =====
1982 Kentucky Supreme Court 6th district election
Candidate	Votes	%
Donald C. Wintersheimer	42,734	54.22
John J. O'Hara (incumbent)	36,077	45.78
Total votes	78,811	100.0

== Local offices ==
=== School boards ===
Local school board members are elected to staggered four-year terms, with half up for election in 1982.

== See also ==
- Elections in Kentucky
- Politics of Kentucky
- Political party strength in Kentucky
