= 2014 Kentucky elections =

A general election was held in the U.S. state of Kentucky on November 4, 2014. The primary election for all offices was held on May 20, 2014.

== Federal offices ==
=== United States Senate ===
Incumbent senator Mitch McConnell won reelection, defeating Democratic challenger Alison Lundergan Grimes.

=== United States House of Representatives ===
Kentucky has six congressional districts, electing five Republicans and one Democrat.

== State offices ==
=== Kentucky Senate ===
The Kentucky Senate consists of 38 members. In 2014, half of the chamber (all even-numbered districts) was up for election. Republicans maintained their majority, picking up three seats.

=== Kentucky House of Representatives ===
All 100 seats in the Kentucky House of Representatives were up for election in 2014. Democrats maintained their majority, without gaining or losing any seats.

=== Kentucky Supreme Court ===
2014 Kentucky Supreme Court elections
- November 4, 2014

4 of the 7 districts of the Kentucky Supreme Court

The Kentucky Supreme Court consists of seven justices elected in non-partisan elections to staggered eight-year terms. Districts 1, 2, 4, and 6 were up for election in 2014.

==== District 1 ====
2014 Kentucky Supreme Court 1st district election
- District 1
Candidate	Bill Cunningham
Popular vote	109,238
Percentage	100.0%
Justice before election
Bill Cunningham
Elected Justice
Bill Cunningham

2014 Kentucky Supreme Court 1st district election
Candidate	Votes	%
Bill Cunningham (incumbent)	Unopposed	
Total votes	109,238	100.0

==== District 2 ====
2014 Kentucky Supreme Court 2nd district election
- District 2
Candidate	John D. Minton Jr.
Popular vote	121,101
Percentage	100.0%
Justice before election
John D. Minton Jr.
Elected Justice
John D. Minton Jr.

2014 Kentucky Supreme Court 2nd district election
Candidate	Votes	%
John D. Minton Jr. (incumbent)	Unopposed	
Total votes	121,101	100.0

==== District 4 ====
2014 Kentucky Supreme Court 4th district election
- District 4
Candidate	Lisabeth Hughes Abramson
Popular vote	142,637
Percentage	100.0%
Justice before election
Lisabeth Hughes Abramson
Elected Justice
Lisabeth Hughes Abramson

2014 Kentucky Supreme Court 4th district election
Candidate	Votes	%
Lisabeth Hughes Abramson (incumbent)	Unopposed	
Total votes	142,637	100.0

==== District 6 ====
2014 Kentucky Supreme Court 6th district election
- District 6
Candidate	Michelle M. Keller	Teresa Cunningham
Popular vote	85,129	60,553
Percentage	58.43%	41.57%
- County results Keller: 50–60% 60–70% Cunningham: 50–60%
Justice before election
Michelle M. Keller
Elected Justice
Michelle M. Keller

2014 Kentucky Supreme Court 6th district election
Candidate	Votes	%
Michelle M. Keller (incumbent)	85,129	58.43
Teresa L. Cunningham	60,553	41.57
Total votes	145,682	100.0

=== Other judicial elections ===
All judges of the Kentucky Court of Appeals and the Kentucky Circuit Courts were elected in non-partisan elections to eight-year terms. All judges of the Kentucky District Courts were elected in non-partisan elections to four-year terms.

== Local offices ==
=== County officers ===
All county officials were elected in partisan elections to four-year terms. The offices include the County Judge/Executive, the Fiscal Court (Magistrates and/or Commissioners), County Clerk, County Attorney, Jailer, Coroner, Surveyor, Property Value Administrator, Constables, and Sheriff.

=== Mayors ===
Mayors in Kentucky are elected to four-year terms, with cities holding their elections in either presidential or midterm years. Cities with elections in 2014 included those in Louisville and in Lexington.

=== City councils ===
Each incorporated city elected its council members to a two-year term.

=== School boards ===
Local school board members are elected to staggered four-year terms, with half up for election in 2014.

=== Louisville Metro Council ===
The Louisville Metro Council is elected to staggered four-year terms, with odd-numbered districts up for election in 2014.

== See also ==
- Elections in Kentucky
- Politics of Kentucky
- Political party strength in Kentucky
