= Kentucky's 42nd House of Representatives district =

American legislative district

Kentucky's 42nd State House of Representatives district
Representative
Joshua Watkins; D–Louisville
since January 1, 2025
- Registration: 75.8% Democratic; 12.0% Republican; 11.5% No party preference
- Demographics: 44.0% White; 44.5% Black; 3.6% Hispanic; 1.3% Asian; 0.2% Native American; 1.2% Other; 5.1% Multiracial
- Population (2024): 42,179
- Registered voters (2026): 29,858

Kentucky's 42nd House of Representatives district is one of 100 districts in the Kentucky House of Representatives. It comprises part of Jefferson County. It has been represented by Joshua Watkins (D–Louisville) since 2025. As of 2024, the district had a population of 42,179.

== Voter registration ==
On January 1, 2026, the district had 29,858 registered voters, who were registered with the following parties.

Party	Registration	
Party	Voters	%
Democratic	22,643	75.84
Republican	3,593	12.03
Independent	1,492	5.00
Libertarian	120	0.40
Green	47	0.16
Socialist Workers	19	0.06
Constitution	8	0.03
Reform	1	0.00
"Other"	1,935	6.48
Total	29,858	100.00

== List of members representing the district ==
Member	Party	Years	Electoral history	District location
Hughes McGill (Louisville)	Democratic	January 1, 1968 – January 22, 1971	Elected in 1967. Reelected in 1969. Died.	1964–1972; Jefferson County (part).
Charlotte McGill (Louisville)	Democratic	February 1971 – January 1, 1978	Elected to finish her husband's term. Reelected in 1971. Reelected in 1973. Reelected in 1975. Lost renomination.	1964–1972; Jefferson County (part).
Charlotte McGill (Louisville)	Democratic	February 1971 – January 1, 1978	Elected to finish her husband's term. Reelected in 1971. Reelected in 1973. Reelected in 1975. Lost renomination.	1972–1974; Jefferson County (part).
Charlotte McGill (Louisville)	Democratic	February 1971 – January 1, 1978	Elected to finish her husband's term. Reelected in 1971. Reelected in 1973. Reelected in 1975. Lost renomination.	1974–1985; Jefferson County (part).
Aubrey Williams (Louisville)	Democratic	January 1, 1978 – January 1, 1985	Elected in 1977. Reelected in 1979. Reelected in 1981. Lost renomination.	1974–1985; Jefferson County (part).
Benny Handy (Louisville)	Democratic	January 1, 1985 – January 1, 1989	Redistricted from the 39th district and reelected in 1984. Reelected in 1986. Lost renomination.	1985–1993; Jefferson County (part).
Leonard Gray (Louisville)	Democratic	January 1, 1989 – December 11, 1995	Elected in 1988. Reelected in 1990. Reelected in 1992. Reelected in 1994. Resigned.	1985–1993; Jefferson County (part).
Leonard Gray (Louisville)	Democratic	January 1, 1989 – December 11, 1995	Elected in 1988. Reelected in 1990. Reelected in 1992. Reelected in 1994. Resigned.	1993–1997; Jefferson County (part).
Eleanor Jordan (Louisville)	Democratic	February 22, 1996 – January 1, 2001	Elected to finish Gray's term. Reelected in 1996. Reelected in 1998. Retired to run for Kentucky's; 3rd congressional district.	1993–1997; Jefferson County (part).
Eleanor Jordan (Louisville)	Democratic	February 22, 1996 – January 1, 2001	Elected to finish Gray's term. Reelected in 1996. Reelected in 1998. Retired to run for Kentucky's; 3rd congressional district.	1997–2003
Reginald Meeks (Louisville)	Democratic	January 1, 2001 – December 17, 2021	Elected in 2000. Reelected in 2002. Reelected in 2004. Reelected in 2006. Reelected in 2008. Reelected in 2010. Reelected in 2012. Reelected in 2014. Reelected in 2016. Reelected in 2018. Reelected in 2020. Resigned.	1997–2003
Reginald Meeks (Louisville)	Democratic	January 1, 2001 – December 17, 2021	Elected in 2000. Reelected in 2002. Reelected in 2004. Reelected in 2006. Reelected in 2008. Reelected in 2010. Reelected in 2012. Reelected in 2014. Reelected in 2016. Reelected in 2018. Reelected in 2020. Resigned.	2003–2015
Reginald Meeks (Louisville)	Democratic	January 1, 2001 – December 17, 2021	Elected in 2000. Reelected in 2002. Reelected in 2004. Reelected in 2006. Reelected in 2008. Reelected in 2010. Reelected in 2012. Reelected in 2014. Reelected in 2016. Reelected in 2018. Reelected in 2020. Resigned.	2015–2023
Keturah Herron (Louisville)	Democratic	February 28, 2022 – January 1, 2025	Elected to finish Meeks's term. Reelected in 2022. Retired to run for the Kentucky Senate.	2015–2023
Keturah Herron (Louisville)	Democratic	February 28, 2022 – January 1, 2025	Elected to finish Meeks's term. Reelected in 2022. Retired to run for the Kentucky Senate.	2023–present
Joshua Watkins (Louisville)	Democratic	January 1, 2025 – present	Elected in 2024. Reelected in 2026.	2023–present
