= Wilfrid Schroder =

American judge (1946–2013)

Justice of the Kentucky Supreme Court
- In office January 1, 2007 – January 17, 2013
- Preceded by: Donald C. Wintersheimer
- Succeeded by: Michelle M. Keller

Judge of the Kentucky Court of Appeals
- In office July 9, 1991 – January 1, 2007
- Preceded by: Judy West
- Succeeded by: Joy Moore

Judge of the 16th Kentucky District Court
- In office November 1983 – July 9, 1991
- Preceded by: Charles J. Brannen
- Succeeded by: Frank Trusty

Personal details
- Born: 1946
- Died: October 26, 2013 (aged 67)

Wilfrid Albert Schroder (1946 – October 26, 2013) was a justice of the Kentucky Supreme Court from 2007 to 2013.

== Early life, education, and career ==
Born in Fort Mitchell, Kentucky, Schroder received a B.A. from the University of Kentucky in 1968, followed by a J.D. degree from the same institution in 1970. He received an LL.M. from the University of Missouri–Kansas City in 1971. He worked for a time at the Kansas City Legal Aid Society, and in-house for the St. Paul Insurance Company, and taught law as an assistant professor at Northern Kentucky University's Salmon P. Chase College of Law. He entered private practice in 1975.

== Judicial career ==
Schroder was a judge of the Kenton County District Court from 1983 to 1991. In June 1991, Governor Wallace Wilkinson appointed him to a seat on the Sixth Appellate District of the Kentucky Court of Appeals vacated by the death of Judge Judy West. Schroder ran unopposed for election to the full term. He served in that capacity until 2006, when he was elected to the state supreme court, serving until his retirement in January 2013, due to health issues caused by a brain tumor.

== Personal life and death ==
Schroder married Nancy E. Quirk, with whom he had two daughters and a son. Nancy, a schoolteacher, died of breast cancer in 1991, at the age of 46. In 1993, he married Susan Wahlbrink, they had no children. Schroder died in Fort Mitchell at the age of 67. His son, Wil Schroder, became a member of the Kentucky Senate.

Political offices
Preceded by Donald C. Wintersheimer	Justice of the Kentucky Supreme Court; 2007–2013	Succeeded by Michelle M. Keller
