= Matt Lockett =

American politician (born 1974)

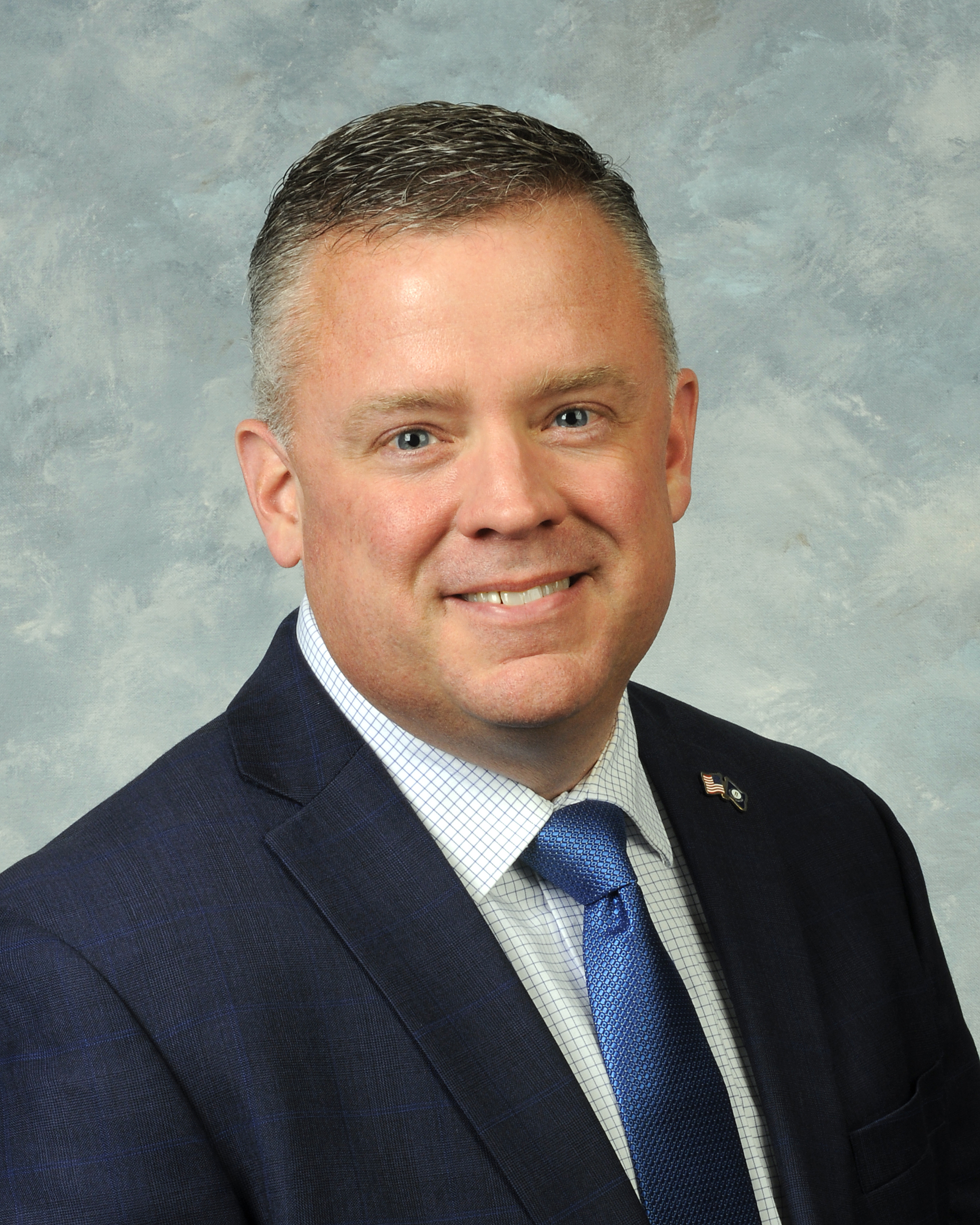

Member of the Kentucky House of Representatives from the 39th district
- Incumbent
- Assumed office January 1, 2021
- Preceded by: Russ Meyer
- Succeeded by: Ryan Stanford (elect)

Personal details
- Born: Edward Matthew Lockett; June 8, 1974 (age 52) Paducah, Kentucky, U.S.
- Party: Republican
- Education: Murray State University (BA); Southern Baptist Theological Seminary (MDiv)

Edward Matthew Lockett (born June 8, 1974) is an American politician and Republican member of the Kentucky House of Representatives from Kentucky's 39th House district since January 2021. His district comprises parts of Fayette and Jessamine counties. Lockett was defeated for reelection in 2026, losing to Democratic candidate Ryan Stanford.

== Background ==
Lockett earned a Bachelor of Science in Political Science from Murray State University, and later earned a Master of Arts from Southern Baptist Theological Seminary.

He is currently employed as a financial adviser at Family Wealth Group. Previously, he served as director of the Kentucky Department of Insurance's Health and Life division as well as the Property and Casualty division. and worked as a financial services professional.

Lockett is also a former chair of the Jessamine County Republican Party as well as a volunteer for the Alzheimer's Association and member of the Jessamine County Chamber of Commerce.

== Political career ==
=== Elections ===
- 2012 Lockett was unopposed in the 2012 Republican primary for Kentucky's 39th House district and was defeated in the 2012 Kentucky House of Representatives election by Democratic incumbent Robert Damron. He garnered 6,364 votes (43,7%).
- 2020 Lockett won the 2020 Republican primary with 3,143 votes (59.9%), and won the 2020 Kentucky House of Representatives election with 13,485 votes (61.1%) against Democratic candidate Carolyn Dupont.
- 2022 Lockett was unopposed in the 2022 Republican primary and won the 2022 Kentucky House of Representatives election with 8,329 votes (59.6%) against Democratic candidate Gwendolyn Mitchell.
- 2024 Lockett was unopposed in the 2024 Republican primary and won the 2024 Kentucky House of Representatives election with 12,660 votes (59.6%) against Democratic candidate Ryan Stanford.
- 2026 Lockett was defeated by Ryan Stanford.
