= Leonard Gray (politician) =

American politician (1942–2005)

Member of the Kentucky House of Representatives from the 42nd district
- In office January 1, 1989 – December 11, 1995
- Preceded by: Benny Handy
- Succeeded by: Eleanor Jordan

Personal details
- Born: June 2, 1942
- Died: July 16, 2005 (aged 63)
- Party: Democratic

Leonard Wilson Gray Sr. (June 2, 1942 – July 16, 2005) was an American politician from Kentucky who was a member of the Kentucky House of Representatives from 1989 to 1995. Gray was first elected in 1988, defeating incumbent Democratic representative Benny Handy in the May primary election. He resigned from the house in December 1995 in order to become a legislative liaison in the administration of governor Paul E. Patton.
