= Charlie Hoffman =

American politician

Majority Caucus Chair of the Kentucky House of Representatives
- In office January 2, 2007 – January 6, 2009
- Preceded by: Robert Damron
- Succeeded by: Robert Damron

Member of the Kentucky House of Representatives from the 62nd district
- In office January 1, 1997 – January 1, 2011
- Preceded by: Dean House
- Succeeded by: Ryan Quarles

Personal details
- Born: April 21, 1956 (age 70) Georgetown, Kentucky, U.S.
- Died: May 28, 2026 Georgetown Kentucky
- Party: Democratic
- Education: University of Kentucky; University of Louisville
- Occupation: Real estate broker, auctioneer, meat cutter

Charles Rodrick "Charlie" Hoffman (1956–2026) was an American politician and former Democratic member of the Kentucky House of Representatives from 1997 to 2011. He represented Kentucky's 62nd House district, which included parts of Fayette, Owen, and Scott counties.

== Background ==
Hoffman was born in Georgetown, Kentucky, and graduated from Georgetown High School in 1974. He received his real estate broker's license in 1980.

== Political career ==
From 1990 to 1996, Hoffman served as a county commissioner on the Scott County Fiscal Court.

In 1996, incumbent Dean House of Kentucky's 62nd House district chose not to seek reelection. Hoffman won the 1996 Democratic primary election with 1,529 votes (33.8%) against three other candidates, and was unopposed in the 1996 Kentucky House of Representatives election and was elected with 8,811 votes. He would be reelected in 1998, 2000, 2002, 2004, 2006, and 2008.

Hoffman served as majority caucus chairman from 2007 to 2008, and led the Democratic majority to its height of 66 Democrats and 34 Republicans in the House.

He was defeated in the 2010 Kentucky House of Representatives election, garnering 8,287 votes (49.3%) against Republican candidate Ryan Quarles.

Hoffman was defeated in the 2016 Kentucky Senate election by incumbent Damon Thayer of Kentucky's 17th Senate district; Hoffman garnered 17,302 votes (32%).

== Legal issues ==
In 2016, Hoffman was arrested following an incident at a bar in Georgetown, Kentucky for a variety of charges including public intoxication, resisting arrest, and evading police. In 2024, Hoffman was arrested again following a dispute regarding a political yard sign displayed by his neighbor. He was charged with false reporting, resisting arrest, assault of a police officer, disorderly conduct, criminal mischief, and menacing.
