= 2016 United States Senate election in Kentucky =

- November 8, 2016
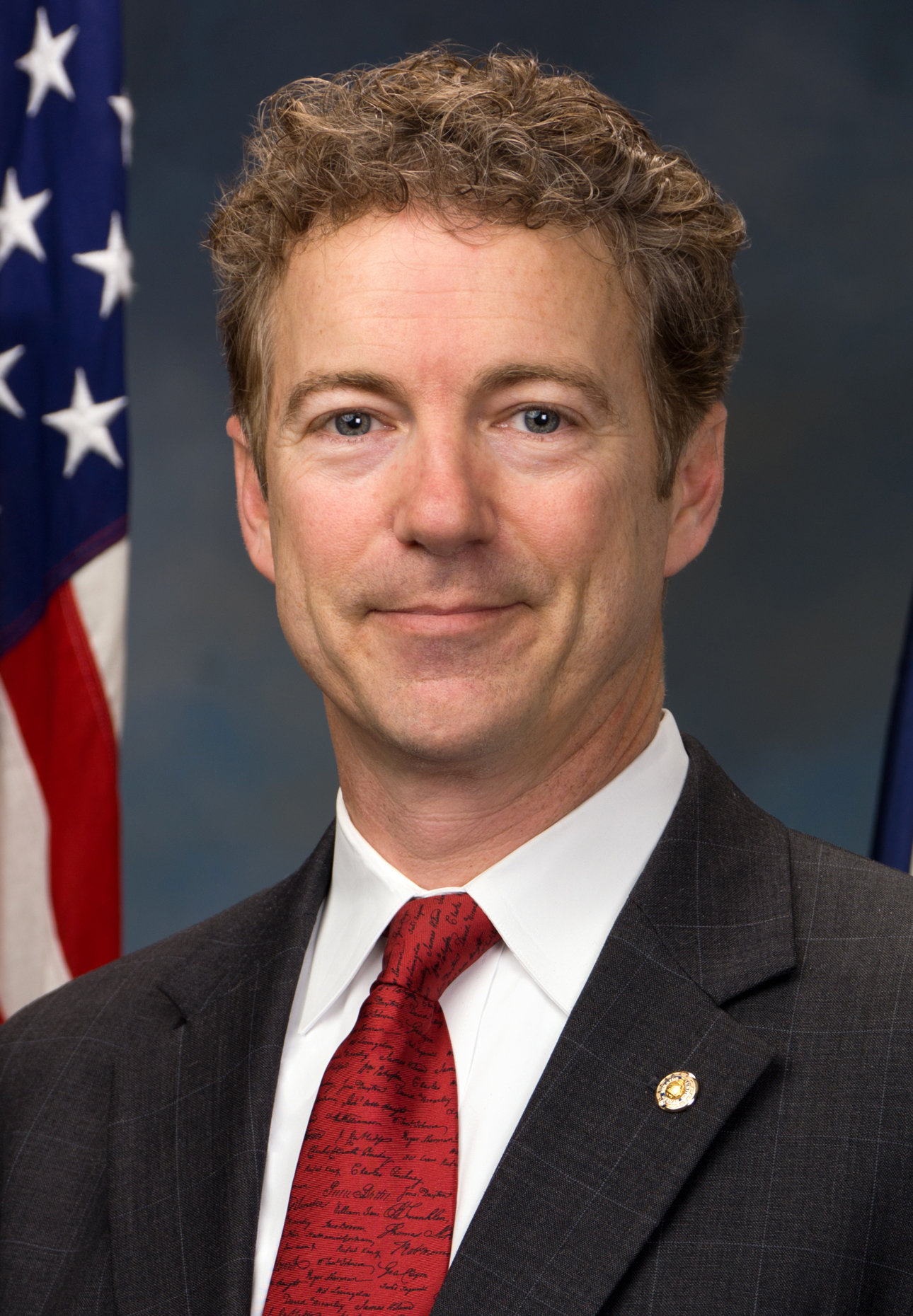

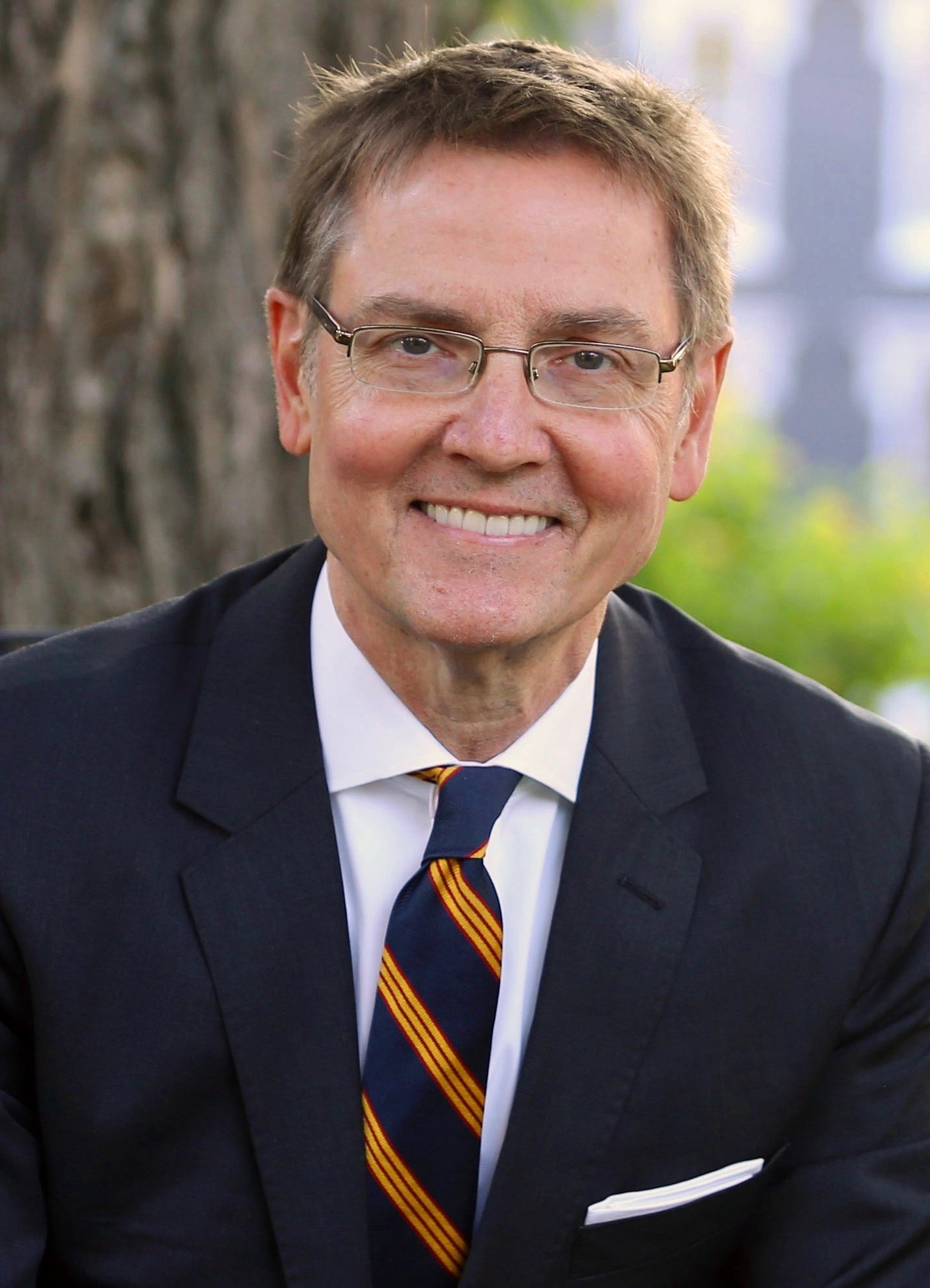
| Nominee | Rand Paul | Jim Gray |
| Party | Republican | Democratic |
| Popular vote | 1,090,177 | 813,246 |
| Percentage | 57.27% | 42.73% |
- Paul: 50–60% 60–70% 70–80% 80–90% >90% Gray: 50–60% 60–70% 70–80% 80–90% >90% Tie: 50% No votes
U.S. senator before election
Rand Paul
Republican
Elected U.S. Senator
Rand Paul
Republican

The 2016 United States Senate election in Kentucky was held November 8, 2016 to elect a member of the United States Senate to represent the State of Kentucky, concurrently with the 2016 U.S. presidential election, as well as other elections to the United States Senate in other states and elections to the United States House of Representatives and various state and local elections. The primaries were held May 17.

Incumbent Republican Senator Rand Paul filed for re-election in December 2015, and Mayor Jim Gray of Lexington filed to run against Paul for the Senate in late January 2016. In the general election, Paul defeated Gray by 14.5 points.

== Background ==
If Paul had become the Republican presidential (or vice-presidential) nominee, state law would have prohibited him from simultaneously running for re-election. In March 2014, the Republican-controlled Kentucky Senate passed a bill that would allow Paul to run for both offices, but the Democratic-controlled Kentucky House of Representatives declined to take it up. Paul spent his own campaign money in the 2014 legislative elections, helping Republican candidates for the State House in the hopes of flipping the chamber, thus allowing the legislature to pass the bill (Democratic governor Steve Beshear's veto could have been overridden with a simple majority). However, the Democrats retained their 54–46 majority in the State House.

Paul was running for both president and re-election, and considered several options to get around the law preventing him from appearing twice on the ballot, but he dropped his presidential bid to focus on re-election to the Senate on February 3, 2016. His supporters said the law does not apply to federal offices and suggested changing the May Kentucky presidential primaries to March caucuses would allow Paul to run for re-election and continue to seek the presidential nomination. However, this option would have only worked until the presidential primaries were over, as he would still have had to appear on the ballot twice in November if he had won the Republican presidential nomination. Other options that were open to him included running for both offices and leaving it to Democratic Secretary of State Alison Lundergan Grimes to remove him from the ballot; attempting to replace Grimes in the 2015 elections with a Republican secretary of state who would not enforce the law; filing a lawsuit against the law; and running for president in every state except for Kentucky, where he could have run for re-election and hoped to win the presidency without Kentucky's electoral college votes.

In a letter to Kentucky Republicans in February 2015, Paul asked them to allow him the same option afforded to Wisconsin Congressman Paul Ryan, who ran for re-election at the same time as vice president on Mitt Romney's ticket. David M. Drucker of The Washington Examiner reported in the same month that Kentucky Republican leaders were concerned that Paul's actions could mean that if he wins the Republican presidential nomination and is renominated for the Senate, he could either be disqualified from the Senate ballot and the state party blocked from replacing him, which would hand the seat to the Democrats, or he could be disqualified from the presidential ballot, which would see the Democratic presidential nominee pick up Kentucky's 8 electoral college votes.

In August 2015, the central committee of the Kentucky Republican Party voted to hold a caucus in 2016, allowing Paul to simultaneously run for re-nomination for his seat and the 2016 Republican presidential nomination. State law would still bar Paul from appearing twice on the ballot in the general election. However, on February 3, 2016, Rand Paul dropped out of the 2016 presidential campaign, allowing him to focus on his reelection bid.

== Republican primary ==
=== Candidates ===
==== Declared ====
- James Gould, financial analyst and Navy veteran
- Rand Paul, incumbent U.S. Senator
- Stephen Slaughter, engineer

==== Declined ====
- Catherine Todd Bailey, businesswoman and former United States Ambassador to Latvia
- Andy Barr, U.S. Representative
- James Comer, former Kentucky Agriculture Commissioner and candidate for Governor of Kentucky in 2015 (running for KY-01)
- Mike Duncan, former chairman of the Republican National Committee
- Trey Grayson, former director of the Institute of Politics at Harvard Kennedy School, former Secretary of State of Kentucky and candidate for the U.S. Senate in 2010
- Brett Guthrie, U.S. Representative
- Hal Heiner, Kentucky Secretary of Education and Workforce Development, former Louisville Metro Council member and candidate for Governor of Kentucky in 2015
- Thomas Massie, U.S. Representative
- Hal Rogers, U.S. Representative
- Ed Whitfield, U.S. Representative

=== Endorsements ===
Rand Paul

Governors

- Matt Bevin, Governor of Kentucky
- Chris Christie, Governor of New Jersey and former 2016 presidential candidate
- John Kasich, Governor of Ohio and former 2016 presidential candidate
- Sarah Palin, former Governor of Alaska and 2008 vice-presidential nominee

U.S. Senators

- Mitch McConnell, Kentucky and Senate Majority Leader
- Marco Rubio, Florida and former 2016 presidential candidate

U.S. Representatives

- Andy Barr, U.S. Representative from Kentucky
- Brett Guthrie, U.S. Representative from Kentucky
- Thomas Massie, U.S. Representative from Kentucky
- Ron Paul, former U.S. Representative from Texas, 1988/2008/2012 presidential candidate, and Rand Paul's father
- Hal Rogers, U.S. Representative from Kentucky
- Ed Whitfield, U.S. Representative from Kentucky

Statewide politicians

- Allison Ball, Kentucky State Treasurer
- James Comer, former Agriculture Commissioner of Kentucky and candidate for Governor of Kentucky in 2015
- Jenean Hampton, Lieutenant Governor of Kentucky
- Mike Harmon, Kentucky State Auditor
- Jeff Hoover, Minority Leader of the Kentucky House of Representatives
- Ryan Quarles, Agriculture Commissioner of Kentucky
- Robert Stivers, President of the Kentucky Senate

Individuals

- Ben Carson, neurosurgeon and former 2016 presidential candidate
- Carly Fiorina, businesswoman, former 2016 presidential candidate and former 2016 vice presidential candidate
- Austin Petersen, commentator, 2016 Libertarian presidential candidate and 2018 US Senate candidate in Missouri as a Republican

Organizations

- Club for Growth
- FreedomWorks

=== Results ===
Results by county Paul: 70–80%; 80–90%; 90–100%

Republican primary results
| Party | Candidate | Votes | % |
|---|---|---|---|
| Republican | Rand Paul (incumbent) | 169,180 | 84.79% |
| Republican | James Gould | 16,611 | 8.33% |
| Republican | Stephen Slaughter | 13,728 | 6.88% |
| Total votes | | 199,519 | 100.00% |

== Democratic primary ==
=== Candidates ===
==== Declared ====
- Jim Gray, Mayor of Lexington
- Rory Houlihan
- Jeff Kender, steelworker
- Ron Leach, physician assistant, U.S. Army veteran, and nominee for KY-02 in 2014
- Tom Recktenwald, retired technology teacher and candidate for the U.S. Senate in 2014
- Grant Short, pilot and businessman
- Sellus Wilder, former Frankfort City Commissioner

==== Declined ====
- Rocky Adkins, Majority Leader of the Kentucky House of Representatives (running for reelection)
- Steve Beshear, former Governor of Kentucky and nominee for U.S. Senate in 1996
- Ben Chandler, former U.S. Representative
- Jack Conway, former Attorney General of Kentucky, nominee for the U.S. Senate in 2010 and nominee for Governor of Kentucky in 2015
- Adam Edelen, former state auditor of Kentucky
- Greg Fischer, Mayor of Louisville and candidate for the U.S. Senate in 2008
- Alison Lundergan Grimes, Secretary of State of Kentucky and nominee for the U.S. Senate in 2014
- Heather French Henry, former Commissioner of the Kentucky Department of Veterans Affairs and former Miss America
- Andrew Horne, attorney, retired United States Marine Corps lieutenant colonel and candidate for KY-03 in 2006
- Ashley Judd, actress and political activist
- Crit Luallen, former Lieutenant Governor of Kentucky and former Kentucky Auditor of Public Accounts
- Jennifer Moore, former Chairwoman of the Kentucky Democratic Party
- Greg Stumbo, Speaker of the Kentucky House of Representatives and former Attorney General of Kentucky (running for reelection)
- David Tandy, President of the Louisville Metro Council

=== Endorsements ===
Jim Gray

Organizations

- Democratic Senatorial Campaign Committee
Sellus Wilder

Organizations

- Climate Hawks Vote
- Kentuckians for the Commonwealth

Individuals

- Wendell Berry

=== Results ===
Results by county Gray: 30–40%; 40–50%; 50–60%; 60–70%; 70–80%; 80–90%

Democratic primary results
| Party | Candidate | Votes | % |
|---|---|---|---|
| Democratic | Jim Gray | 240,613 | 58.73% |
| Democratic | Sellus Wilder | 52,728 | 12.87% |
| Democratic | Ron Leach | 39,026 | 9.53% |
| Democratic | Tom Recktenwald | 21,910 | 5.35% |
| Democratic | Grant Short | 21,558 | 5.26% |
| Democratic | Jeff Kender | 20,239 | 4.94% |
| Democratic | Rory Houlihan | 13,585 | 3.32% |
| Total votes | | 409,659 | 100.00% |

== General election ==
=== Debates ===
| Dates | Location | Paul | Gray | Link |
|---|---|---|---|---|
| October 31, 2016 | Lexington, Kentucky | Participant | Participant | |

=== Predictions ===
| Source | Ranking | As of |
|---|---|---|
| The Cook Political Report | Safe R | November 2, 2016 |
| Sabato's Crystal Ball | Safe R | November 7, 2016 |
| Rothenberg Political Report | Safe R | November 3, 2016 |
| Daily Kos | Safe R | November 8, 2016 |
| Real Clear Politics | Likely R | November 7, 2016 |

=== Polling ===
View source data.

| Poll source | Date(s) administered | Sample size | Margin of error | Rand Paul (R) | Jim Gray (D) | Undecided |
|---|---|---|---|---|---|---|
| SurveyMonkey | November 1–7, 2016 | 1,315 | ± 4.6% | 50% | 46% | 4% |
| SurveyMonkey | October 31–November 6, 2016 | 1,155 | ± 4.6% | 51% | 46% | 3% |
| SurveyMonkey | October 28–November 3, 2016 | 843 | ± 4.6% | 52% | 45% | 3% |
| SurveyMonkey | October 27–November 2, 2016 | 635 | ± 4.6% | 50% | 46% | 4% |
| SurveyMonkey | October 26–November 1, 2016 | 499 | ± 4.6% | 51% | 44% | 5% |
| SurveyMonkey | October 25–31, 2016 | 424 | ± 4.6% | 52% | 46% | 2% |
| Western Kentucky University | October 25–30, 2016 | 602 | ± 4.0% | 55% | 39% | 6% |
| RunSwitch Public Relations (R) | October 26–28, 2016 | 811 | ± 3.4% | 52% | 42% | 6% |
| Cofounder Pulse Poll | October 26–28, 2016 | 1,016 | ± 3.8% | 35% | 28% | 38% |
| Cofounder Pulse Poll | October 12–15, 2016 | 816 | ± 3.4% | 33% | 27% | 40% |
| Cofounder Pulse Poll | September 14–16, 2016 | 834 | ± 3.2% | 33% | 25% | 42% |
| Cofounder Pulse Poll | August 2–4, 2016 | 508 | ± 3.6% | 59% | 41% | 0% |
| Harper Polling | July 31–August 1, 2016 | 500 | ± 4.4% | 50% | 38% | 13% |
| Cofounder Pulse Poll | March 30–April 1, 2016 | 758 | ± 3.0% | 28% | 26% | 47% |

Hypothetical polling

with Thomas Massie

| Poll source | Date(s) administered | Sample size | Margin of error | Thomas Massie (R) | Steve Beshear (D) | Other | Undecided |
|---|---|---|---|---|---|---|---|
| Public Policy Polling | June 18–21, 2015 | 1,108 | ± 2.9% | 38% | 43% | — | 19% |
| Public Policy Polling | August 7–10, 2014 | 991 | ± 3.1% | 30% | 45% | — | 24% |

| Poll source | Date(s) administered | Sample size | Margin of error | Thomas Massie (R) | Crit Luallen (D) | Other | Undecided |
|---|---|---|---|---|---|---|---|
| Public Policy Polling | June 18–21, 2015 | 1,108 | ± 2.9% | 37% | 35% | — | 28% |

with Rand Paul

| Poll source | Date(s) administered | Sample size | Margin of error | Rand Paul (R) | Steve Beshear (D) | Other | Undecided |
|---|---|---|---|---|---|---|---|
| Public Policy Polling | June 18–21, 2015 | 1,108 | ± 2.9% | 49% | 39% | — | 12% |
| Public Policy Polling | August 7–10, 2014 | 991 | ± 3.1% | 50% | 41% | — | 9% |

| Poll source | Date(s) administered | Sample size | Margin of error | Rand Paul (R) | Crit Luallen (D) | Other | Undecided |
|---|---|---|---|---|---|---|---|
| Public Policy Polling | June 18–21, 2015 | 1,108 | ± 2.9% | 51% | 37% | — | 12% |

=== Results ===
United States Senate election in Kentucky, 2016
| Party | Candidate | Votes | % | ±% |
|---|---|---|---|---|
| Republican | Rand Paul (incumbent) | 1,090,177 | 57.27% | +1.58% |
| Democratic | Jim Gray | 813,246 | 42.73% | −1.53% |
| Write-in | | 42 | 0.00% | N/A |
| Total votes | | 1,903,465 | 100.0% | N/A |
| Republican hold | | | | |

==== Counties that flipped from Democratic to Republican ====
- Carroll (largest city: Carrollton)
- Breathitt (largest city: Jackson)
- Carter (largest city: Grayson)
- Hancock (largest city: Hawesville)
- Magoffin (largest city: Salyersville)
- Powell (largest city: Stanton)
- McLean (largest city: Livermore)
- Morgan (largest city: West Liberty)
- Knott (largest municipality: Hindman)
- Henderson (largest city: Henderson)
- Muhlenberg (largest city: Central City)
- Floyd (largest municipality: Prestonburg)
- Fleming (largest city: Flemingsburg)
- Lincoln (largest city: Stanford)
- Bath (largest municipality: Owingsville)
- Menifee (largest municipality: Frenchburg)
- Wolfe (largest municipality: Campton)
- Robertson (largest municipality: Mount Olivet) (previously tied)

==== By congressional district ====
Paul won four of six congressional districts, with the remaining two going to Gray, including one that elected a Republican.

| District | Paul | Gray | Representative |
|---|---|---|---|
| 1st | 66% | 34% | James Comer |
| 2nd | 61% | 39% | Brett Guthrie |
| 3rd | 40% | 60% | John Yarmuth |
| 4th | 66% | 34% | Thomas Massie |
| 5th | 66% | 34% | Hal Rogers |
| 6th | 48% | 52% | Andy Barr |
