= Ryan Stanford =

American politician

Member-elect of the Kentucky House of Representatives from the 39th district
- Assuming office January 1, 2027
- Succeeding: Matt Lockett

Personal details
- Party: Democratic
- Website: Campaign website

Ryan Stanford is an American politician who is the member-elect for the 39th district of the Kentucky House of Representatives. He was elected at the 2026 election, unseating incumbent Republican Matt Lockett. He was a candidate in 2024. Stanford supports term limits.
