= Nancy L. Allf =

American judge

Judge, Eighth Judicial District Court, Las Vegas, Nevada
- In office 2011–2024
- Succeeded by: Erika Mendoza

Personal details
- Education: Transylvania University (B.A. 1979); Salmon P. Chase College of Law, Northern Kentucky University (J.D. 1982)

Nancy Lee Allf is a retired American judge, who served for 13 years on Nevada's Eighth Judicial District Court, located in Las Vegas, Clark County. As a lawyer, she was involved in the creation of Nevada's business courts, which she later served on for ten years as a judge. She received numerous awards for her judicial service and for her leadership as a lawyer, and has held many leadership positions in the legal community.

== Judicial service ==
In 2010, Alff was elected for the first time to the trial level Eighth Judicial District Court, in Las Vegas, Clark County, Nevada. She was subsequently re-elected in 2014 and 2020. She served from 2011 until her retirement in January 2024. Allf became the Las Vegas District Court civil division's presiding judge in 2021. She served on the Eighth Judicial District Court's Business Court for ten years, until her retirement. She was succeeded by Erika Mendoza as a district court judge.

Before serving as a Business Court judge, in 2000, while still a lawyer, Nevada's Supreme Court made Allf a member of its Business Court Task Force, which studied the creation and implementation of a specialized business court docket in Nevada. The Business Court has a specialized jurisdiction, designed for judges to hear complex cases involving disputes of a business or commercial nature. The Business Court's judges use enhanced judicial case management methods in handling matters before them.

In addition to her involvement in creating Nevada's business courts and serving on the Clark County Business Court, Allf has served nationally as a Business Court Representative to the American Bar Association's Business Law Section, and is a member of the American College of Business Court Judges. She has been active in the American Bar Association's Business Law Section, including participating in its Diversity Clerkship Program where diverse law students serve as clerks to business court judges across the United States.

== Legal practice and service prior to becoming a judge ==
In 1983, Allf was admitted to legal practice in Nevada, and worked in the private practice of law until she became a judge, focusing on commercial and bankruptcy law. Among other positions as a practicing lawyer, she was the managing partner at the private law firm of Allf Paustian & Szostek & Associates from 1999 to 2005, a law firm partner at Parsons, Behle & Latimer from 2005 to 2007, and a partner at the firm of Gonzalez, Saggio & Harlan LLP from 2007 to 2009.

As a leader in the legal community, before becoming a judge, Allf was president of the State Bar of Nevada (the state bar association), president of the Board of Directors of the Clark County Law Foundation, president of the Clark County Bar Association, a member of the State Bar of Nevada's Board of Governors, and a member of the Board of Directors of the Clark County Law Foundation.

From 1998 to 2007, Nevada's Supreme Court appointed Allf as a Settlement Judge. In 2005 she was appointed to become a Judge in the Clark County District Court's Short Trial Program.

After retiring as a judge, Allf joined the private alternative dispute resolution provider JAMS, where she provides services as a mediator, arbitrator, referee/special master, and neutral evaluator.

== Education ==
Allf received a Bachelor of Arts degree from Transylvania University in 1979, and her Juris Doctor degree from the Salmon P. Chase College of Law at Northern Kentucky University in 1982.

== Awards and honors ==
In 2024, Allf was honored with the Presidential Award by the State Bar of Nevada. "Given annually, the Presidential Award honors a State Bar of Nevada member who has practiced law for 20 years or more and whose conduct, honesty and integrity represent the highest standards of the legal profession. Recipients are those who inspire by example, advance the administration of justice and bring honor and integrity to the profession of law."

Allf also has received the following awards and honors, among others;

- The Legal Excellence Lifetime Achievement Award from the Las Vegas Defense Lawyers (2024)
- The Liberty Bell Award from the Clark County Law Foundation (2023). This award honors "individuals who uphold the rule of law, contribute to good government within the community, stimulate a sense of civic responsibility, and encourage respect for the law in the courts."
- The Miriam Shearing Award from the Southern Nevada Association of Women Attorneys for her contributions to the advancement of women in the law (2022)
- The Bryan K. Scott Trailblazer Award from the State Bar of Nevada (2022)
- Salmon P. Chase College of Law's Alumna of the Year (2010)
- The Women of Diversity Project named her among the 300 women who shaped the history of Las Vegas (2005)
- The Community Achievement Award from the Las Vegas Chamber of Commerce (2002)
- The President's Award, Distinguished Service Award, from the Clark County Bar Association (2001)
- Honored as among Women of Distinction by the National Association of Women Business Owners (2000)
- Distinguished Alumni Award from Transylvania University (1999)
- Recognized by the Clark County Pro Bono Project for public service to the community

== Positions and memberships ==
Allf has held the following positions, among others;

- President of the State Bar of Nevada (2007)
- Member, State Bar of Nevada's Board of Governors (2000 to 2009)
- Appointed by Supreme Court of Nevada to the Pro Bono Compliance Committee (2002)
- President of the Board of Directors of the Clark County Law Foundation (2000)
- Appointed by Supreme Court of Nevada to the Business Court Task Force (2000)
- President of the Clark County Bar Association (1999)
- Member, Board of Directors of the Clark County Law Foundation (1994 to 2002)
- President, Board of Directors of Planned Parenthood of Southern Nevada (1992)
- Member, American College of Business Court Judges
- Business Court Representative to the American Bar Association's Business Law Section
