= Aubrey Williams (politician) =

American politician

Member of the Kentucky House of Representatives from the 42nd district
- In office January 1, 1978 – January 1, 1985
- Preceded by: Charlotte McGill
- Succeeded by: Benny Handy

Personal details
- Born: February 27, 1945 (age 81)
- Party: Democratic

Aubrey Williams (born February 27, 1945) is an American politician from Kentucky who was a member of the Kentucky House of Representatives from 1978 to 1985. Williams was first elected in 1977, defeating incumbent representative Charlotte McGill for renomination. Due to redistricting, Williams ran for reelection in 1984 against fellow incumbent Benny Handy, who had been moved into his district. Williams lost the primary election by one vote.
