= Joseph U. Meyer =

American politician

Joe Meyer

Mayor of Covington
- In office January 2017 – January 2025
- Preceded by: Sherry Carran
- Succeeded by: Ron Washington

Member of the Kentucky Senate from the 23rd district
- In office January 1, 1989 – January 1, 1997
- Preceded by: Gus Sheehan
- Succeeded by: Jack Westwood

Member of the Kentucky House of Representatives from the 65th district
- In office January 1, 1982 – January 1, 1989
- Preceded by: John Isler
- Succeeded by: Martin Sheehan

Personal details
- Born: September 10, 1948 (age 78)
- Party: Democratic

Joseph U. Meyer (born September 10, 1948) is an American politician from Kentucky who served as the mayor of Covington from 2017 to 2025. Meyer previously served in the Kentucky Senate and Kentucky House of Representatives.

Meyer was first elected to the house in 1981 after incumbent representative John Isler retired. He was elected to the senate in 1988, defeating incumbent senator Gus Sheehan for renomination. Meyer was defeated for reelection in 1996 by Republican Jack Westwood.

Meyer was elected mayor in 2016, defeating incumbent Sherry Carran, who was seeking a second four-year term. He was reelected in 2020 and did not seek reelection in 2024.
