= Benny Handy =

American politician (born 1937)

Member of the Kentucky House of Representatives
- In office January 1, 1982 – January 1, 1989
- Preceded by: Lawrence Ray Maynard
- Succeeded by: Leonard Gray
- Constituency: 39th district (1982–1985); 42nd district (1985–1989)

Personal details
- Born: October 15, 1937 (age 88)
- Party: Democratic

Benny H. Handy (born October 15, 1937) is an American politician from Kentucky who was a member of the Kentucky House of Representatives from 1982 to 1989.

Handy was first elected to the 39th district in 1981 following the retirement of incumbent representative Lawrence Maynard. In 1982, redistricting moved Handy to the 42nd district, to which he was elected in 1984. He was defeated for renomination in 1988 by Leonard Gray.

Kentucky House of Representatives
Preceded by Lawrence Ray Maynard	Member of the Kentucky House of Representatives from the 39th district 1982–1985	Succeeded by Pearl Strong
Preceded by Aubrey Williams	Member of the Kentucky House of Representatives from the 42nd district 1985–1989	Succeeded by Leonard Gray
