= Martin Sheehan =

American politician

Judge of the 16th Kentucky Circuit Court
- In office November 2007 – January 5, 2015

Judge of the 16th Kentucky District Court
- In office January 3, 1994 – November 2007

Member of the Kentucky House of Representatives from the 65th district
- In office January 1, 1989 – January 3, 1994
- Preceded by: Joseph U. Meyer
- Succeeded by: Arnold Simpson

Personal details
- Party: Democratic
- Parent: Gus Sheehan (father)

Martin J. Sheehan (born 1957) is an American politician and jurist from Kentucky who was a member of the Kentucky House of Representatives from 1989 to 1994, a judge of the 16th Kentucky District Court from 1994 to 2007, and a judge of the 16th Kentucky Circuit Court from 2007 to 2015. Sheehan was first elected to the house in 1988 after incumbent representative Joseph U. Meyer ran successfully for the Kentucky Senate. In 1993 Sheehan was elected to the 16th district court. He was elected to the 16th circuit court in 2007 to fill an unexpired term and did not seek reelection in 2014.
