= Jim Gray (American politician) =

American politician

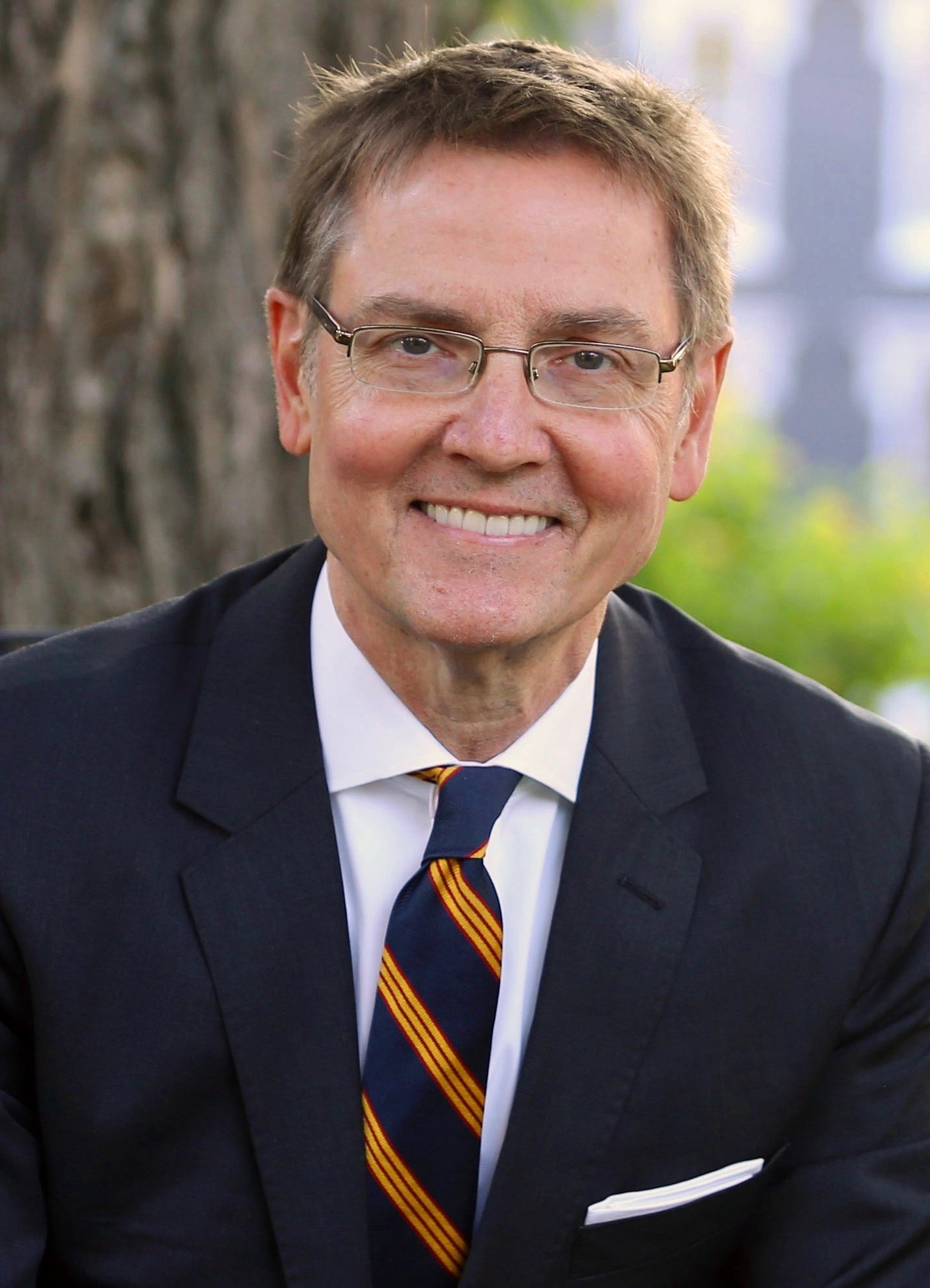
- Gray in 2015

Secretary of Transportation of Kentucky
- In office December 10, 2019 – April 14, 2026
- Governor: Andy Beshear
- Preceded by: Greg Thomas
- Succeeded by: Rebecca Goodman

Mayor of Lexington
- In office January 3, 2011 – January 7, 2019
- Preceded by: Jim Newberry
- Succeeded by: Linda Gorton

Personal details
- Born: August 18, 1953 (age 73) Glasgow, Kentucky, U.S.
- Party: Democratic
- Education: Emory University (attended); Western Kentucky University (attended); Vanderbilt University (BA)

James P. Gray II (born August 18, 1953) is an American politician who was the Kentucky secretary of transportation in the administration of Governor Andy Beshear from 2019 to 2026. He was previously the mayor of Lexington, Kentucky from 2011 to 2019. Gray served as the city's vice mayor from 2007 to 2010 before being elected mayor in November 2010. Gray won re-election to another four-year term on November 4, 2014. In 2016, he ran for the United States Senate seat held by U.S. Senator Rand Paul. Gray won the May 17 Democratic primary with nearly 60% of the vote. Gray lost the November 8 general election to Paul.

Prior to serving as mayor, Gray was Chairman and CEO of Gray Construction, an engineering, design, and construction company headquartered in Lexington. Once elected, he took an advisory role as Chair of the Board of Directors to focus on his role as mayor.

== Early life and education ==
Gray was raised in Glasgow, Kentucky, the third oldest of Lois and James Norris Gray's six children. He started his college career at Emory University in Atlanta but returned home to help out with the family business when his father died in 1972. He took classes briefly at Western Kentucky University before transferring to Vanderbilt University, commuting between Glasgow and Nashville while earning a degree in history. After graduating in 1975, he joined the family construction business full-time.

In 1996, after more than 20 years in the construction industry, Gray stepped away from the business for a year to study leadership and urban issues as a Loeb Fellow at Harvard University's Graduate School of Design.

The Loeb Fellowship program was created for accomplished practitioners "to pause, study, and reflect at a great University [to] enable those who designed and built our cities to return with renewed insight and energy."

== Family business ==
Gray's father founded the James N. Gray Construction Company in 1960, Following James Norris Gray's death from lung cancer in 1972 at the age of 54, his oldest son, Howard, then 23, became president of the company. Howard worked closely with Jim, their mother Lois and other family members to preserve the business. After going through insolvency in 1981, James N. Gray Construction Company was recapitalized as Gray, Inc. Today, Gray, Inc. is one of leading construction and engineering firms in the country.

Located in the historic Wolf-Wile Building on Lexington's Main Street, Gray, Inc. also has offices in 15 states as well as Canada and Japan.

Gray, Inc., specializes in the construction, engineering, automation, and development of large-scale buildings such as data and distribution centers, EV Battery, solar and renewable energy, manufacturing, and food and beverage facilities in the U.S. and abroad. Among clients for whom projects have been completed are Amazon, Toyota, Hyundai, Ford SK-On, Procter & Gamble, and Siemens.

Gray Construction was an industry pioneer in offering its customers both building design and construction services, a practice now widespread in the construction industry. To promote this new design-build concept, Jim Gray conceived and co-founded the Design-Build Institute of America in 1993.

After leading Gray Inc.'s marketing and operations for many years, Jim Gray became president and CEO of Gray Inc. and the Gray Companies in October 2004, serving until 2009.

== Political career ==
=== Early career ===
In 1972, at the age of 19, Gray became the second youngest person ever elected as a delegate to the Democratic National Convention, which was held in Miami.

Gray's next foray into politics came two decades later when Kentucky Governor Brereton Jones asked him to chair his Committee on Quality and Efficiency. The committee produced the "Wake-Up Call for Kentucky Report," an audit of executive branch spending that included recommendations to eliminate $1 billion in wasteful state spending.

Gray's first run for office was a bid for Lexington Mayor in 2002. He lost the primary and endorsed Teresa Isaac, who was elected.

=== Vice Mayor of Lexington ===
In 2006, Gray ran for one of three Council-at-Large seats in the Lexington-Fayette Urban County Council and was elected. As the largest vote-getter among the council-at-large candidates, Gray became vice mayor and served from 2007 to 2010.

In his role as Vice Mayor, Gray positioned himself as a guardian of rate-payers and taxpayers, challenging Mayor Jim Newberry on overspending at the Blue Grass Airport and potential water-rate hikes.

During his term as vice mayor, Gray expressed opposition to proposals for CentrePoint, a planned hotel, residential and retail complex that was to be built downtown at an estimated cost of $250 million. CentrePoint would have included a 35-story high-rise, which would have been the tallest building in Lexington and whose construction would require the leveling of numerous historic buildings. Gray sided with preservationists who argued CentrePoint's design was out of scale and aesthetically incompatible with Lexington's other downtown buildings, many of which had been built in the 19th century or early 20th century. The fight over CentrePoint lasted years and the development went through financing issues and multiple redesigns, eventually becoming City Center, which opened in 2020.

=== Mayor of Lexington ===
In 2010, Gray entered the race for mayor, challenging the incumbent Jim Newberry.

During the campaign, Gray developed the "Fresh Start Plan," containing a pledge to run the government like a good business, with increased transparency and efficiency and with reduced spending and debt.

In November 2010, Gray defeated Newberry 53% to 46% and became one of the nation's few openly gay mayors, and the first openly gay mayor in the city's history.

Before his inauguration, Gray had the entire Mayor's Office moved from the 12th floor of Lexington's Urban Government Center to a first-floor ballroom, creating an open office atmosphere that was inspired by his own office at Gray. To learn more about the operations of modern, large city government, the newly elected mayor paid a visit to New York City Mayor Michael Bloomberg.

Gray has publicly stated that his administration would focus on three areas: creating jobs, making government more efficient, and building Lexington into a great American city.

With Louisville Mayor Greg Fischer, Gray launched a joint Lexington-Louisville economic-development initiative in conjunction with the Brookings Institution. The Bluegrass Economic Advancement Movement (BEAM) project is aimed at building the bluegrass region of Kentucky as a global center for advanced manufacturing.

Gray was re-elected mayor by a wide margin in 2014.

=== Built environment projects ===
A staunch proponent of historic preservation and adaptive reuse, Gray has championed multiple projects that repurposed historic properties and remade public spaces with a greater emphasis on design. Examples from his terms in city government include the Historic Fayette County Courthouse, 21c Museum Hotel, Lexington's Distillery District, Town Branch Commons (a 22-mile walking and bicycle trail) Town Branch Park, and renovations to Rupp Arena and the Lexington Convention Center.

In 2023, the University of Kentucky College of Design opened the Gray Design Building, a new collaborative learning space located in a former tobacco warehouse. Gray, Inc. donated $5.2 million to the college to support the project.

=== U.S. Senate campaign ===
On January 26, 2016, Gray announced that he was running for the United States Senate in 2016 for the seat then and currently held by U.S. Senator and former presidential candidate Rand Paul. The senate race was described as an "uphill battle" for Gray. Gray won the Democratic nomination for the U.S. Senate in Kentucky on May 17, 2016.

On November 8, 2016, Paul defeated Gray 57% to 43%.

=== U.S. House campaign ===
On December 5, 2017, Gray announced that he would run for the United States House of Representatives, entering the Democratic primary for Kentucky's 6th congressional district. He was defeated in the May 22, 2018 Democratic primary by Amy McGrath.

=== Kentucky Secretary of Transportation ===
On December 2, 2019, Kentucky governor-elect Andy Beshear, announced in a news conference that Gray would be appointed as Kentucky Secretary of Transportation. Gray was sworn in on December 10. On April 14, 2026, Beshear announced that Gray would be replaced as secretary by Rebecca Goodman.

== Personal life ==
A collector of contemporary art, Gray created and helped endow the New York Art Experience, an annual art-appreciation trip to New York City for University of Kentucky Gaines Fellows.

Gray was married for seven years to Kathleen Binder. In 2005, Gray publicly announced that he is gay in an article published in the Lexington Herald-Leader.

Since 2017, he and his partner, Eric Orr, have resided in Lexington.

Political offices
Preceded by Jim Newberry	Mayor of Lexington; 2011–2019	Succeeded by Linda Gorton
Party political offices
Preceded by Jack Conway	Democratic nominee for U.S. Senator from Kentucky (Class 3); 2016	Succeeded by Charles Booker
