= Russ Meyer (politician) =

American politician

Member of the Kentucky House of Representatives from the 39th district
- In office January 1, 2015 – October 13, 2020
- Preceded by: Robert Damron
- Succeeded by: Matt Lockett

Mayor of Nicholasville
- In office 2007–2014

Member of the Nicholasville City Commission
- In office 2001–2006

Personal details
- Born: April 29, 1968 (age 58)
- Party: Democratic

Russell Anderson Meyer (born April 29, 1968) is an American politician from Kentucky who was a member of the Kentucky House of Representatives from 2015 to 2020. Meyer was first elected in 2014 after incumbent representative Robert Damron retired to run for Judge/Executive of Jessamine County. He did not seek reelection in 2020 and was succeeded by Republican Matt Lockett. Meyer also served as a Member of the Nicholasville City Commission from 2001 to 2006 and as mayor from 2007 to 2014.
