= 2000 United States House of Representatives elections in Kentucky =

- November 7, 2000

All 6 Kentucky seats to the United States House of Representatives
	Majority party	Minority party
Party	Republican	Democratic
Last election	5	1
Seats won	5	1
Seat change	Steady	Steady
Popular vote	824,915	561,752
Percentage	57.47%	39.14%

Republican
40–50%
50–60%
60–70%
70–80%
80–90%
Democratic
40–50%
50–60%
60–70%
80–90%

The 2000 United States House of Representatives elections in Kentucky were held on November 7, 2000, to elect the six U.S. representatives from the state of Kentucky, one from each of the state's six congressional districts. The elections coincided with the 2000 U.S. presidential election, other elections to the House of Representatives, and other elections held in Kentucky. Primary elections were held on May 16, 2000.

== Overview ==
District	Republican		Democratic		Others		Total		Result
District	Votes	%	Votes	%	Votes	%	Votes	%	Result
District 1	132,115	57.97%	95,806	42.03%	0	0.00%	227,921	100.0%	Republican hold
District 2	160,800	67.72%	74,537	31.39%	2,125	0.89%	237,462	100.0%	Republican hold
District 3	142,106	52.87%	118,875	44.23%	7,804	2.90%	268,785	100.0%	Republican hold
District 4	100,943	43.52%	125,872	54.26%	5,148	2.22%	231,963	100.0%	Democratic hold
District 5	145,980	73.55%	52,495	26.45%	0	0.00%	198,475	100.0%	Republican hold
District 6	142,971	52.80%	94,167	34.77%	33,665	12.43%	270,803	100.0%	Republican hold
Total	824,915	57.47%	561,752	39.14%	48,742	3.40%	1,435,409	100.0%	

== District 1 ==
2000 Kentucky's 1st congressional district election
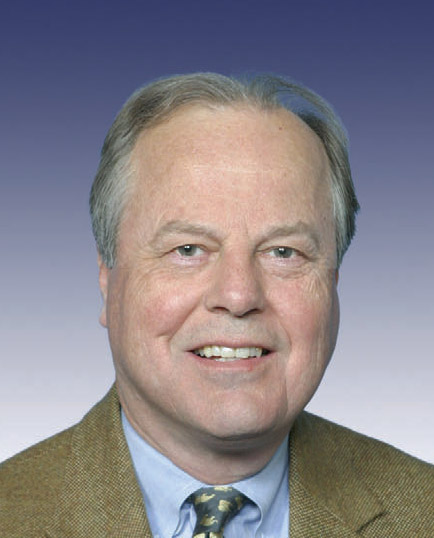

Nominee	Ed Whitfield	Brian S. Roy
Party	Republican	Democratic
Popular vote	132,115	95,806
Percentage	58.0%	42.0%
- County results Whitfield: 50–60% 60–70% 70–80% 80–90% Roy: 50–60%
U.S. Representative before election
Ed Whitfield
Republican
Elected U.S. Representative
Ed Whitfield
Republican

Incumbent Republican representative Ed Whitfield won reelection with 58.0 percent of the vote.

=== Republican primary ===
==== Candidates ====
===== Nominee =====
- Ed Whitfield, incumbent U.S. representative

===== Eliminated in primary =====
- David Lynn Williams, perennial candidate

==== Results ====
Results by county: Whitfield: 60–70%; 70–80%; 80–90%; 90–100%

Republican primary results
Party	Candidate	Votes	%
Republican	Edward Whitfield (incumbent)	12,013	83.8
Republican	David Lynn Williams	2,317	16.2
Total votes		14,330	100.0

=== Democratic primary ===
==== Candidates ====
===== Nominee =====
- Brian S. Roy

=== General election ===
==== Results ====
2000 Kentucky's 1st congressional district election
Party	Candidate	Votes	%
Republican	Edward Whitfield (incumbent)	132,115	58.0
Democratic	Brian S. Roy	95,806	42.0
Total votes		227,921	100.0
Republican hold			

== District 2 ==
2000 Kentucky's 2nd congressional district election
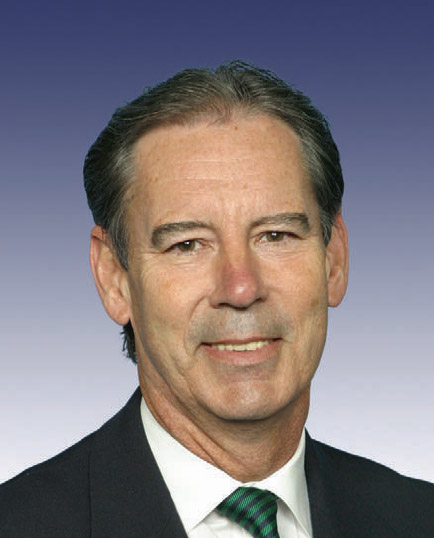

Nominee	Ron Lewis	Brian Pedigo
Party	Republican	Democratic
Popular vote	160,800	74,537
Percentage	67.7%	31.4%
- County results Lewis: 50–60% 60–70% 70–80% 80–90%
U.S. Representative before election
Ron Lewis
Republican
Elected U.S. Representative
Ron Lewis
Republican

Incumbent Republican representative Ron Lewis won reelection with 67.7 percent of the vote.

=== Republican primary ===
==== Candidates ====
===== Nominee =====
- Ron Lewis, incumbent U.S. representative

=== Democratic primary ===
==== Candidates ====
===== Nominee =====
- Brian Pedigo

=== Independent and third-party candidates ===
==== Libertarian Party ====
- Michael A. Kirkman

=== General election ===
==== Results ====
2000 Kentucky's 2nd congressional district election
Party	Candidate	Votes	%
Republican	Ron Lewis (incumbent)	160,800	67.7
Democratic	Brian Pedigo	74,537	31.4
Libertarian	Michael A. Kirkman	2,125	0.9
Total votes		237,462	100.0
Republican hold			

== District 3 ==
2000 Kentucky's 3rd congressional district election
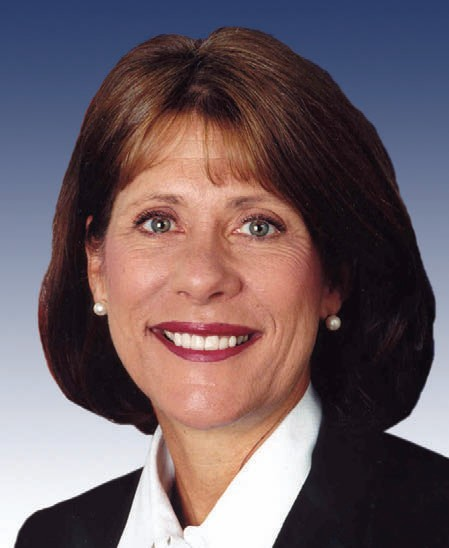

Nominee	Anne Northup	Eleanor Jordan
Party	Republican	Democratic
Popular vote	142,106	118,875
Percentage	52.9%	44.2%
U.S. Representative before election
Anne Northup
Republican
Elected U.S. Representative
Anne Northup
Republican

Incumbent Republican representative Anne Northup won reelection with 52.9 percent of the vote.

=== Republican primary ===
==== Candidates ====
===== Nominee =====
- Anne Northup, incumbent U.S. representative

=== Democratic primary ===
==== Candidates ====
===== Nominee =====
- Eleanor Jordan, state representative from the 42nd district (1996–2001)

===== Eliminated in primary =====
- Ray Abbott
- Burrel Charles Farnsley

==== Results ====
Democratic primary results
Party	Candidate	Votes	%
Democratic	Eleanor Jordan	24,236	69.3
Democratic	Ray Abbott	5,583	16.0
Democratic	Burrel Charles Farnsley	5,138	14.7
Total votes		34,957	100.0

=== Independent and third-party candidates ===
==== Libertarian Party ====
- Donna Walker Mancini

=== General election ===
==== Polling ====
Poll source	Date(s)	Sample size	Margin of error	Anne Northup (R)	Eleanor Jordan (D)	Other / undecided (Note: Calculated by taking the difference of 100% and all other candidates combined.)
Louisville Courier-Journal	October 24, 2000	696	—	49%	39%	12%

==== Results ====
2000 Kentucky's 3rd congressional district election
Party	Candidate	Votes	%
Republican	Anne Meagher Northup (incumbent)	142,106	52.9
Democratic	Eleanor Jordan	118,875	44.2
Libertarian	Donna Walker Mancini	7,804	2.9
Total votes		268,785	100.0
Republican hold			

== District 4 ==
2000 Kentucky's 4th congressional district election
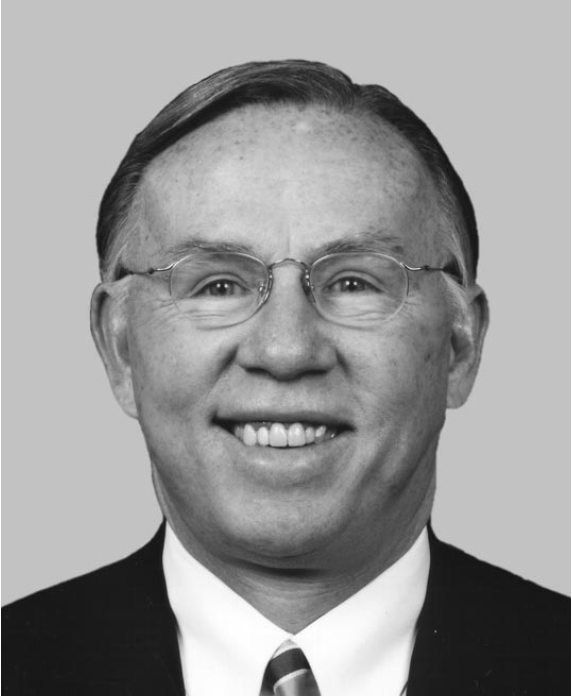

Nominee	Ken Lucas	Don Bell
Party	Democratic	Republican
Popular vote	125,872	100,943
Percentage	54.3%	43.5%
- County results Lucas: 40–50% 50–60% 60–70% 80–90% Bell: 40–50% 60–70%
U.S. Representative before election
Ken Lucas
Democratic
Elected U.S. Representative
Ken Lucas
Democratic

Incumbent Democratic representative Ken Lucas won reelection with 54.3 percent of the vote.

=== Democratic primary ===
==== Candidates ====
===== Nominee =====
- Ken Lucas, incumbent U.S. representative

=== Republican primary ===
==== Candidates ====
===== Nominee =====
- Don Bell

===== Eliminated in primary =====
- Roger Thoney
- Scott Tooley

==== Results ====
Results by county: Bell: 40–50%; 50–60%; 60–70%; 70–80%

Republican primary results
Party	Candidate	Votes	%
Republican	Don Bell	6,427	57.0
Republican	Scott Tooley	2,700	24.0
Republican	Roger Thoney	2,140	19.0
Total votes		11,267	100.0

=== Independent and third-party candidates ===
==== Green Party ====
- Ken Sain

==== Libertarian Party ====
- Alan Handleman

=== General election ===
==== Polling ====
Poll source	Date(s)	Sample size	Margin of error	Ken Lucas (D)	Don Bell (R)	Other / undecided (Note: Calculated by taking the difference of 100% and all other candidates combined.)
SurveyUSA	October 25, 2000	500	—	60%	37%	3%

==== Results ====
2000 Kentucky's 4th congressional district election
Party	Candidate	Votes	%
Democratic	Ken Lucas (incumbent)	125,872	54.3
Republican	Don Bell	100,943	43.5
Green	Ken Sain	3,662	1.6
Libertarian	Alan Handleman	1,486	0.6
Total votes		231,963	100.0
Democratic hold			

== District 5 ==
2000 Kentucky's 5th congressional district election
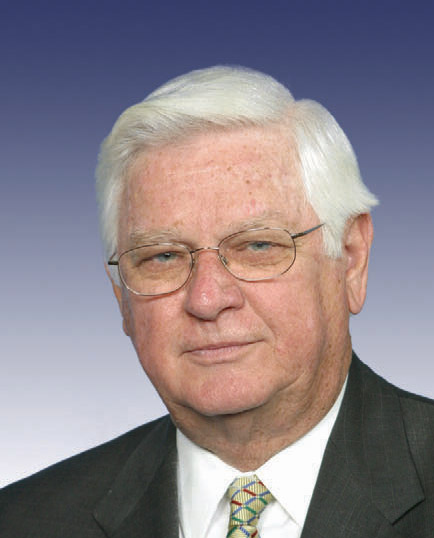

Nominee	Hal Rogers	Sidney Jane Bailey
Party	Republican	Democratic
Popular vote	145,980	52,495
Percentage	73.6%	26.4%
- County results Rogers: 50–60% 60–70% 70–80% 80–90%
U.S. Representative before election
Hal Rogers
Republican
Elected U.S. Representative
Hal Rogers
Republican

Incumbent Republican representative Hal Rogers won reelection with 73.6 percent of the vote.

=== Republican primary ===
==== Candidates ====
===== Nominee =====
- Hal Rogers, incumbent U.S. representative

=== Democratic primary ===
==== Candidates ====
===== Nominee =====
- Sidney Jane Bailey

===== Eliminated in primary =====
- Michael Vincent Vacca Jr.

==== Results ====
Results by county: Bailey: 50–60%; 60–70%; 70–80%; Vacca: 50–60%

Democratic primary results
Party	Candidate	Votes	%
Democratic	Sidney Jane Bailey	20,726	66.2
Democratic	Michael Vincent Vacca Jr.	10,594	33.8
Total votes		31,320	100.0

=== General election ===
==== Results ====
2000 Kentucky's 5th congressional district election
Party	Candidate	Votes	%
Republican	Harold "Hal" Rogers (incumbent)	145,980	73.6
Democratic	Sidney Jane Bailey	52,495	26.4
Total votes		198,475	100.0
Republican hold			

== District 6 ==
2000 Kentucky's 6th congressional district election
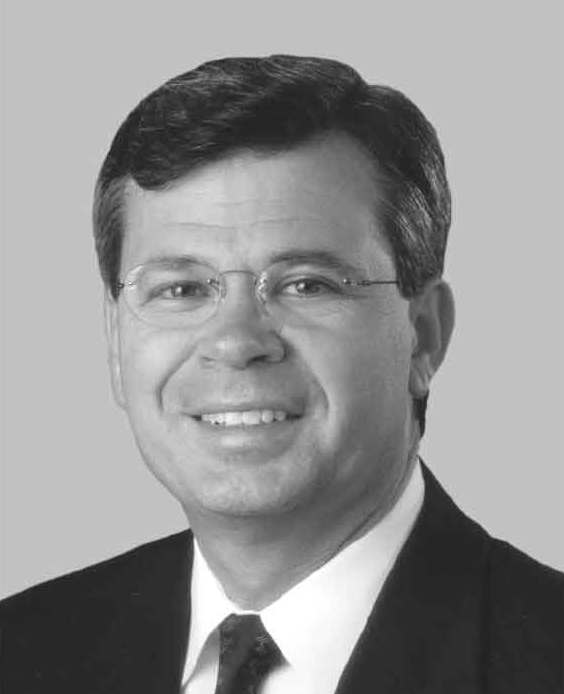

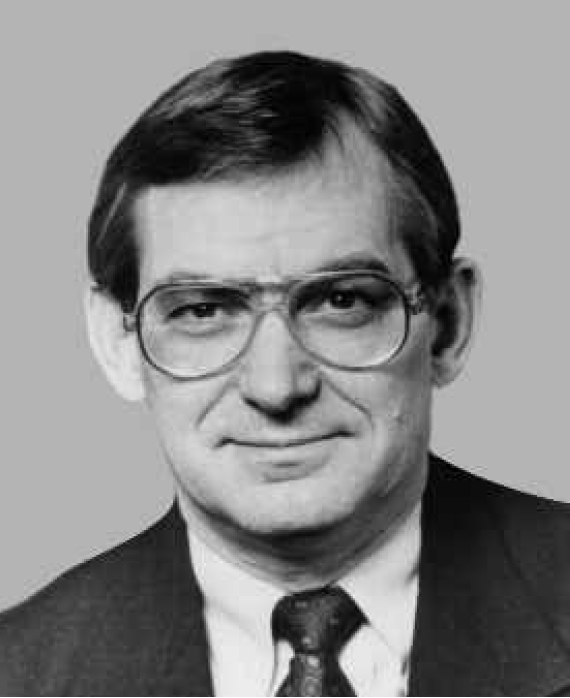

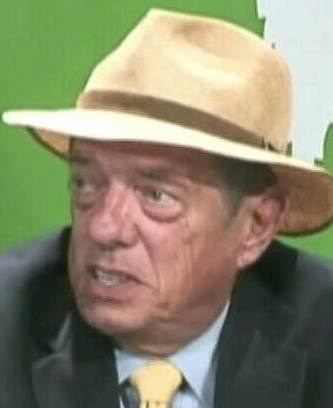
Nominee	Ernie Fletcher	Scotty Baesler	Gatewood Galbraith
Party	Republican	Democratic	Independent
Popular vote	142,971	94,167	32,436
Percentage	52.8%	34.8%	12.0%
- County results Fletcher: 40–50% 50–60% 60–70%
U.S. Representative before election
Ernie Fletcher
Republican
Elected U.S. Representative
Ernie Fletcher
Republican

Incumbent Republican representative Ernie Fletcher won reelection with 52.8 percent of the vote.

=== Republican primary ===
==== Candidates ====
===== Nominee =====
- Ernie Fletcher, incumbent U.S. representative

=== Democratic primary ===
==== Candidates ====
===== Nominee =====
- Scotty Baesler, former U.S. Representative from the 6th district (1993–1999)

===== Eliminated in primary =====
- Will L. McGinnis III

==== Results ====
Results by county: Baesler: 60–70%; 70–80%; 80–90%

Democratic primary results
Party	Candidate	Votes	%
Democratic	Scotty Baesler	38,463	76.1
Democratic	Will L. McGinnis III	12,090	23.9
Total votes		50,553	100.0

=== Independent and third-party candidates ===
==== Independent candidates ====
- Gatewood Galbraith, perennial candidate

==== Libertarian Party ====
- Joseph Novak

=== General election ===
==== Results ====
2000 Kentucky's 6th congressional district election
Party	Candidate	Votes	%
Republican	Ernie Fletcher (incumbent)	142,971	52.8
Democratic	Scotty Baesler	94,167	34.8
Independent	Gatewood Galbraith	32,436	12.0
Libertarian	Joseph Novak	1,229	0.5
Total votes		270,803	100.0
Republican hold			
