= Pearl Strong =

American politician (1922–1997)

Member of the Kentucky House of Representatives from the 39th district
- In office January 1, 1985 – January 1, 1987
- Preceded by: Benny Handy (redistricting)
- Succeeded by: William Strong

Member of the Kentucky Senate from the 23rd district
- In office January 1, 1968 – January 1, 1972
- Preceded by: Bill Engle
- Succeeded by: Gus Sheehan (redistricting)

Personal details
- Born: October 9, 1922
- Died: October 8, 1997 (aged 74)
- Party: Democratic

Pearl Strong (October 9, 1922 – October 8, 1997) was an American politician from Ary, Kentucky.

== Political career ==
Strong started his political career as the Perry County Magistrate, serving from 1964 to 1968. Then he was elected to the Kentucky Senate where he represented the 23rd district from 1968 to 1972. Over a decade later in 1984, Strong was elected to the Kentucky House where he served from 1984 to 1986.
