= Joshua Watkins =

Kentucky politician

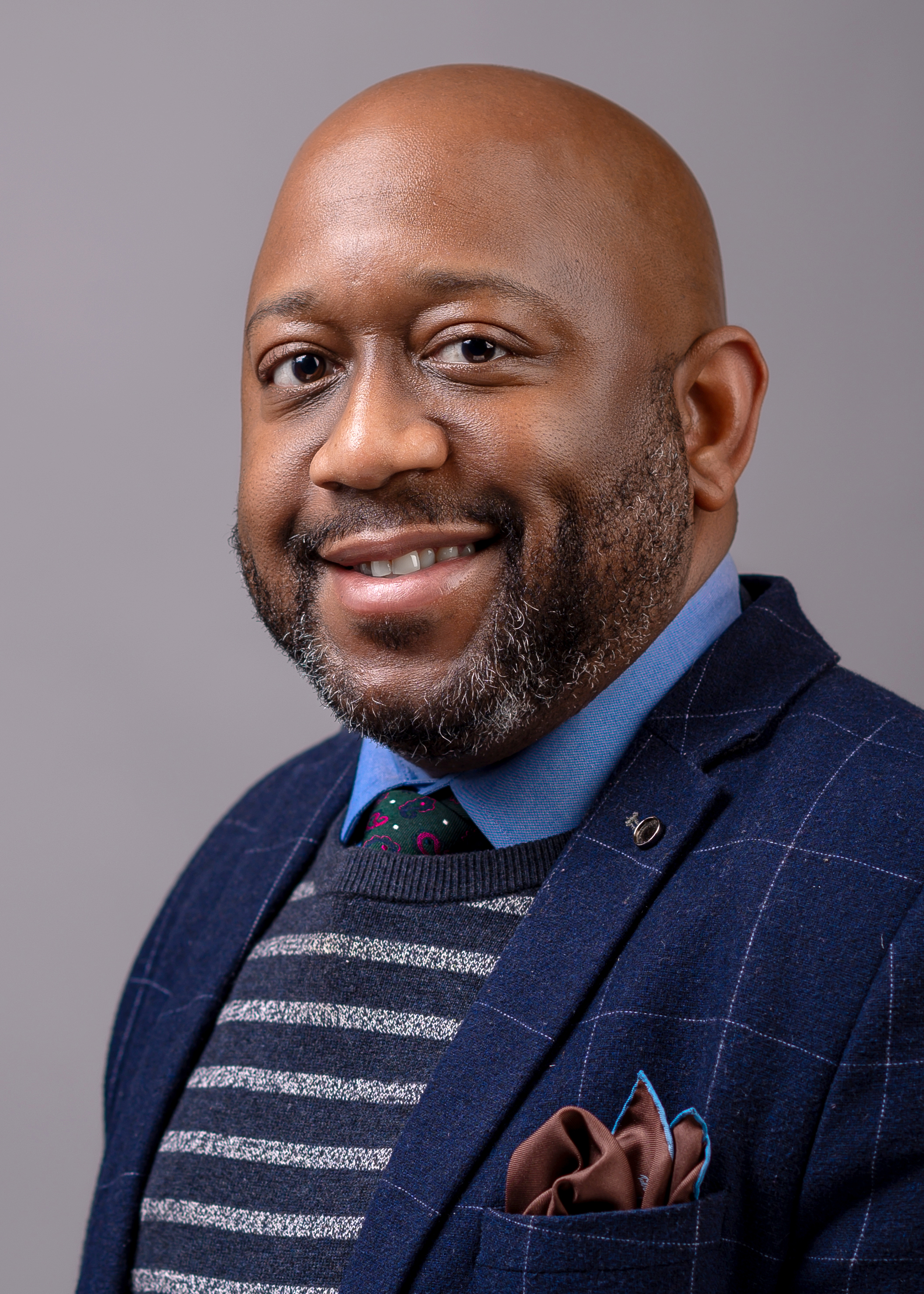

Minority Whip of the Kentucky House of Representatives
- Incumbent
- Assumed office November 13, 2025
- Preceded by: Lindsey Burke

Member of the Kentucky House of Representatives from the 42nd district
- Incumbent
- Assumed office January 1, 2025
- Preceded by: Keturah Herron

Personal details
- Born: September 27, 1985 (age 40)
- Party: Democratic

Joshua Jedidiah Watkins (born September 27, 1985) is an American politician and member of the Kentucky House of Representatives since January 2025. He represents Kentucky's 42nd House district, which comprises part of Jefferson County. He has served as House Minority Whip since November 2025.

== Political career ==
Watkins was elected unopposed in the 2024 Kentucky House of Representatives election following the retirement of incumbent representative Keturah Herron to run for the Kentucky Senate. He defeated two other candidates in the May primary election.

In November 2025, Minority Caucus Chair Al Gentry stepped down from his leadership position. Incumbent Minority Whip Lindsey Burke was selected to succeed Gentry as caucus chair, and Watkins was selected to succeed Burke as whip.

== Electoral history ==
=== 2024 ===
Democratic primary results
Party	Candidate	Votes	%
Democratic	Joshua Watkins	2,103	53.0
Democratic	Jonathan Musselwhite	951	24.0
Democratic	Jack W. Walker	914	23.0
Total votes		3,968	100.0

2024 Kentucky House of Representatives 42nd district election
Party	Candidate	Votes	%
Democratic	Joshua Watkins	Unopposed	
Total votes		12,350	100.0
Democratic hold			

Kentucky House of Representatives
Preceded by Keturah Herron	Member of the Kentucky House of Representatives from the 42nd district 2025–present	Succeeded by incumbent
