= Donald C. Wintersheimer =

American judge (1931–2021)

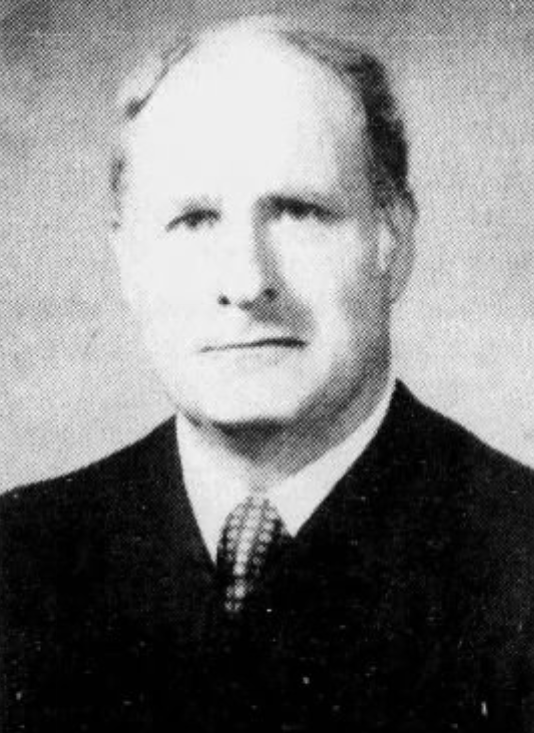
- Wintersheimer, c. 1982

Justice of the Kentucky Supreme Court
- In office January 3, 1983 – January 1, 2007
- Preceded by: John J. O'Hara
- Succeeded by: Wilfrid Schroder

Judge of the Kentucky Court of Appeals
- In office November 1976 – January 3, 1983
- Preceded by: Robert F. Greene
- Succeeded by: William R. Dunn

Personal details
- Born: Donald Carl Wintersheimer; April 21, 1931 Covington, Kentucky, U.S.
- Died: February 18, 2021 (aged 89) Covington, Kentucky, U.S.
- Spouse: Alice Rabe
- Children: 3 sons, 2 daughters
- Parents: Carl Wintersheimer (father); Marie Kohl (mother)
- Education: Villa Madonna College (A.B. 1953); Xavier University (M.A. 1957); University of Cincinnati College of Law (J.D. 1960)

Donald Carl Wintersheimer (April 21, 1931 – February 18, 2021) was an American jurist who was a justice of the Kentucky Supreme Court from 1983 to 2006.

== Early life and career ==
Wintersheimer was born April 21, 1931, in Covington, Kentucky, the son of Carl and Marie Kohl Wintersheimer. He was raised in Bellevue, Kentucky, and attended Villa Madonna College, receiving an A.B. in 1953. He served in the U.S. Army Infantry from 1953 to 1955, then went on to earn an M.A. from Xavier University in 1957 and a J.D. from the University of Cincinnati College of Law in 1960. After beginning in the private practice of law and marrying Alice Rabe, he was the solicitor for Covington for fourteen years, and became known as an advocate for consumer protection.

== Judicial and later career ==
Wintersheimer was elected to the Kentucky Court of Appeals in 1976, and to the Kentucky Supreme Court in 1982, defeating appointed incumbent John J. O'Hara. He won reelection in 1990 and 1998. He served from January 3, 1983, to January 1, 2007. He was a prolific opinion writer, including opinions that established the constitutional basis for the family court in Kentucky, established the constitutional basis for economic development in Kentucky, established the tort of outrage in Kentucky, and established the guidelines for open records investigations in Kentucky. He taught business law at Thomas More University before becoming an adjunct professor in constitutional law at Chase College of Law for twenty years. In 2010, he published a memoir titled, "Secrets of the Kentucky Supreme Court."

He died on February 18, 2021, in Covington.

== Electoral history ==
1976 general election: Judge of the Kentucky Court of Appeals, 6th district, 2nd division
Candidate	Votes	%
Donald C. Wintersheimer	38,520	58.1
Robert F. Greene	27,826	41.9

1982 primary election: Justice of the Kentucky Supreme Court, 6th district
Candidate	Votes	%
Donald C. Wintersheimer	11,077	39.0
John J. O'Hara (i)	9,068	31.6
Tim Nolan	8,235	29.0

1982 general election: Justice of the Kentucky Supreme Court, 6th district (unofficial results)
Candidate	Votes	%
Donald C. Wintersheimer	42,734	54.2
John J. O'Hara (i)	36,077	45.8

1990 general election: Justice of the Kentucky Supreme Court, 6th district
Candidate	Votes	%
Donald C. Wintersheimer	unopposed	100

1998 general election: Justice of the Kentucky Supreme Court, 6th district
Candidate	Votes	%
Donald C. Wintersheimer	62,336	61.8
Edwin Kagin	38,538	38.2

Political offices
Preceded by John J. O'Hara	Justice of the Kentucky Supreme Court, 6th district 1983–2006	Succeeded by Wilfrid Schroder
