= Dean House (politician) =

American politician

Member of the Kentucky House of Representatives from the 62nd district
- In office June 1996 – January 1, 1997
- Preceded by: Mark Farrow
- Succeeded by: Charlie Hoffman

Personal details
- Born: June 15, 1938
- Died: September 28, 2023 (aged 85)
- Party: Democratic

Dean Kepple House (June 15, 1938 – September 28, 2023) was an American politician from Kentucky who was a member of the Kentucky House of Representatives from June 1996 to January 1997. House was elected in a June 1996 special election after incumbent representative Mark Farrow resigned. He was not on the ballot for the November general election and was succeeded by Charlie Hoffman.

He died in September 2023 at age 85.
