= Mark Farrow (politician) =

American politician

Member of the Kentucky House of Representatives from the 62nd district
- In office January 1, 1980 – April 29, 1996
- Preceded by: Mark Fitzgerald
- Succeeded by: Dean House

Personal details
- Born: 1947
- Died: August 17, 2016 (aged 69)
- Party: Democratic

Mark Farrow (1947 – August 17, 2016) was an American politician from Kentucky who was a member of the Kentucky House of Representatives from 1980 to 1996. Farrow was first elected in 1979, defeating incumbent representative Mark Fitzgerald for renomination. He resigned from the house in April 1996 in order to become general counsel for the Kentucky Department of Agriculture.

He died in August 2016 at age 69.
