= Hughes McGill =

American politician

Member of the Kentucky House of Representatives from the 42nd district
- In office January 1, 1968 – January 22, 1971
- Preceded by: Charles A. Brady
- Succeeded by: Charlotte McGill

Personal details
- Born: April 22, 1920
- Died: January 22, 1971 (aged 50)
- Party: Democratic

Hughes Eugene McGill (April 22, 1920 – January 22, 1971) was an American politician from Kentucky who was a member of the Kentucky House of Representatives from 1968 until his death in 1971. McGill was first elected in 1967, defeating incumbent Republican representative Charles A. Brady. He died in office on January 22, 1971, and was succeeded by his wife Charlotte McGill.
