= Gray Construction =

Coordinates: 38.043270°N 84.494887°W

Gray Construction is an American construction contractor based in Lexington, Kentucky. It was founded in 1960 by James Norris Gray and Lois Howard Gray in their hometown of Glasgow, Kentucky.

Gray's son, James P. "Jim" Gray, served as chairman of the board and CEO of the company until he was elected mayor of Lexington. Upon taking office in 2011, Gray stepped down and became chairman of the board of directors. His brother, Stephen Gray, took over as CEO.

Gray specializes in design-build projects, including major structures for Toshiba and R.R. Donnelley, among others. The company has offices in Versailles, Kentucky; Charlotte, North Carolina; Birmingham, Alabama; Anaheim, California; and Tokyo, Japan.

In 2018, Gray Construction partnered with the engineering and equipment fabrication company SPEC Engineering.
