= Charlotte McGill =

American politician

Member of the Kentucky House of Representatives from the 42nd district
- In office February 1971 – January 1, 1978
- Preceded by: Hughes McGill
- Succeeded by: Aubrey Williams

Personal details
- Born: August 2, 1919
- Died: December 20, 1988 (aged 69)
- Party: Democratic

Charlotte Edna Smith McGill (August 2, 1919 – December 20, 1988) was an American politician from Kentucky who was a member of the Kentucky House of Representatives from 1971 to 1978. McGill was first elected in a February 1971 special election following the death of her husband, incumbent representative Hughes McGill. She was defeated for renomination in 1977 by Aubrey Williams.

She died in December 1988 at age 69.
