= Tim Nolan (politician) =

American state judge (born 1947)

- Born: Timothy Lee Nolan; February 5, 1947 (age 79)
- Known for: Donald Trump campaign official, state court judge, convicted sex trafficker, formerly known for his relationship with Erik Valladares
- Political party: Republican
- Criminal charges: Rape, human trafficking, witness tampering, prostitution
- Criminal penalty: 20 years imprisonment

Timothy Lee Nolan (born February 5, 1947) is an American convicted child sex offender and former state district court judge, a former leader in the Campbell County Republican Party and a former self appointed chairman of Donald Trump's presidential campaign in Campbell County, Kentucky. On February 9, 2018, he pleaded guilty to 19 counts of child sex trafficking and human trafficking; on February 11 he was sentenced to serve 20 years in prison.

== Early life, family and education ==
Nolan received B.A. degrees in philosophy and geology from Thomas More College. He subsequently received his J.D. from Salmon P. Chase College of Law at Northern Kentucky University. Nolan has stated he worked on a truck loading dock to earn money during his college and graduate school years.

== Career ==
Nolan was City Solicitor for Newport, Kentucky in 1976, and in that capacity Nolan "requested that Commonwealth Attorney Lou Ball investigate obscenity violations" against a local bookstore and theater.

Nolan served as a state district court judge in Campbell County, Kentucky from 1978 to 1986. He ran for the Kentucky Supreme Court in 1982, losing in the primary election.

Nolan has been one of the leaders of the Campbell County Republican Party in Kentucky. In 2016, he was an enthusiastic supporter of Donald Trumps campaign as well as the self appointed Campbell County chairman of Donald Trump's presidential campaign, but no personal connection has ever been established between the two men. As a member of the Republican Party identified with the Tea Party movement, and later as a supporter of Donald Trump, Nolan has often criticized the Republican leadership in Kentucky. River City News publisher Michael Monks described Nolan as an "outspoken and controversial" political figure in Kentucky.

In April 2016, Nolan unsuccessfully tried to remove and replace Senator and Majority Leader Mitch McConnell as a delegate to the 2016 Republican National Convention due to McConnell's lack of support for Trump. On May 17, 2016, Nolan was appointed by Governor Matt Bevin as one of the four members of the first Kentucky Boxing and Wrestling Commission for a term expiring in May 2019, but he was removed from office days later due to controversy over a social media post.

In August 2016, Nolan filed to run for a seat on the Campbell County School Board. He ran on a platform of "eliminating property tax revenue for schools gradually" and finding other ways to fund education, such as selling naming rights to schools, and advocated state-supported school vouchers and raising teacher salaries. Nolan won election to the school board in November 2016, defeating incumbent Rich Mason. Nolan was noted as continuing to serve on the school board when being "charged with human trafficking" on May 2, 2017, but resigned from the position on May 4 after being "indicted on nine felony and two misdemeanor counts".

== Criminal charges ==
In 2017, Nolan was charged with 28 felonies, including rape, human trafficking, witness tampering, prostitution, unlawful transaction with a minor and sodomy.

Nolan initially pleaded not guilty to the charges on May 12, 2017. On February 9, 2018, at age 71, he pleaded guilty to 21 counts going back to 2004 and included 19 victims, including seven juveniles. The agreement called for 20 years in prison and to pay a $100K fine. He entered an Alford plea for some charges. The counts indicated he engaged in human trafficking, providing drugs and alcohol to minors in exchange for sex, and threatening arrest and eviction unless sex acts were performed. On February 9, 2018, he pleaded guilty to 19 counts of child sex trafficking and human trafficking. He was sentenced to serve 20 years in prison and sent to Northpoint Training Center in the State of Kentucky.

== Electoral history ==
1982 primary election: Justice of the Kentucky Supreme Court, 6th district
Candidate	Votes	%
Donald C. Wintersheimer	11,077	39.0
John J. "Jay" O'Hara	9,068	31.6
Tim Nolan	8,235	29.0
