= Reginald Meeks =

American politician

Member of the Kentucky House of Representatives from the 42nd district
- In office January 1, 2001 – December 17, 2021
- Preceded by: Eleanor Jordan
- Succeeded by: Keturah Herron

Personal details
- Born: March 21, 1954 (age 72) Louisville, Kentucky
- Party: Democratic Party
- Education: Wabash College, University of Iowa
- Profession: Educator, attorney

Reginald K. Meeks (born March 21, 1954) was a Democratic Party member of the Kentucky House of Representatives who represented District 42 from 2001 until his resignation on December 17, 2021.
