= William Strong (Kentucky politician) =

American politician (born 1943)

Minority Leader of the Kentucky House of Representatives
- In office January 3, 1989 – January 8, 1991
- Preceded by: Willard Allen
- Succeeded by: Tom Jensen

Member of the Kentucky House of Representatives from the 39th district
- In office January 1, 1987 – January 1, 1993
- Preceded by: Pearl Strong
- Succeeded by: Robert Damron (redistricting)

Personal details
- Born: May 28, 1943 (age 83)
- Party: Republican

William Ryder Strong (born May 28, 1943) is an American politician from Kentucky who was a member of the Kentucky House of Representatives from 1987 to 1993.

Strong was first elected in 1986, defeating Democratic candidate John Paul Amis. Amis had defeated incumbent Democratic representative Pearl Strong for renomination. The redistricting of the house in 1991 moved the 39th district from eastern Kentucky to Jessamine County, and parts of Garrard and Lincoln. Strong's native Perry County was split into four districts; declined to seek reelection and was succeeded by Robert Damron.

Following his service in the house, Strong pleaded guilty to mail fraud as part of Operation Boptrot.
