= Kentucky's 39th House of Representatives district =

American legislative district

Kentucky's 39th State House of Representatives district
Representative
Matt Lockett; R–Nicholasville
since January 1, 2021
- Registration: 47.2% Republican; 39.6% Democratic; 12.6% No party preference
- Demographics: 81.6% White; 5.9% Black; 6.2% Hispanic; 3.0% Asian; 0.1% Native American; 0.1% Hawaiian/Pacific Islander; 0.2% Other; 3.1% Multiracial
- Population (2024): 45,947
- Registered voters (2026): 33,309

Kentucky's 39th House of Representatives district is one of 100 districts in the Kentucky House of Representatives. Located in the greater Lexington area, it comprises parts of Fayette and Jessamine Counties. It has been represented by Matt Lockett (R–Nicholasville) since 2021. As of 2024, the district had a population of 45,947.

== Voter registration ==
On January 1, 2026, the district had 33,309 registered voters, who were registered with the following parties.

Party	Registration	
Party	Voters	%
Republican	15,713	47.17
Democratic	13,190	39.60
Independent	2,241	6.73
Libertarian	158	0.47
Green	44	0.13
Constitution	15	0.05
Socialist Workers	7	0.02
Reform	0	0.00
"Other"	2,247	5.83
Total	33,309	100.00

== List of members representing the district ==
Member	Party	Years	Electoral history	District location
Benny Handy (Louisville)	Democratic	January 1, 1982 – January 1, 1985	Elected in 1981. Redistricted to the 42nd district.	1974–1985; Jefferson County (part).
Pearl Strong (Ary)	Democratic	January 1, 1985 – January 1, 1987	Elected in 1984. Lost renomination.	1985–1993; Harlan, Owsley, and Perry Counties (parts).
William Strong (Hazard)	Republican	January 1, 1987 – January 1, 1993	Elected in 1986. Reelected in 1988. Reelected in 1990. Retired after being redistricted to the 90th district.	1985–1993; Harlan, Owsley, and Perry Counties (parts).
Robert Damron (Nicholasville)	Democratic	January 1, 1993 – January 1, 2015	Elected in 1992. Reelected in 1994. Reelected in 1996. Reelected in 1998. Reelected in 2000. Reelected in 2002. Reelected in 2004. Reelected in 2006. Reelected in 2008. Reelected in 2010. Reelected in 2012. Retired to run for Judge/Executive of Jessamine County.	1993–1997; Garrard, Jessamine, and Lincoln Counties (parts).
Robert Damron (Nicholasville)	Democratic	January 1, 1993 – January 1, 2015	Elected in 1992. Reelected in 1994. Reelected in 1996. Reelected in 1998. Reelected in 2000. Reelected in 2002. Reelected in 2004. Reelected in 2006. Reelected in 2008. Reelected in 2010. Reelected in 2012. Retired to run for Judge/Executive of Jessamine County.	1997–2003
Robert Damron (Nicholasville)	Democratic	January 1, 1993 – January 1, 2015	Elected in 1992. Reelected in 1994. Reelected in 1996. Reelected in 1998. Reelected in 2000. Reelected in 2002. Reelected in 2004. Reelected in 2006. Reelected in 2008. Reelected in 2010. Reelected in 2012. Retired to run for Judge/Executive of Jessamine County.	2003–2015
Russ Meyer (Nicholasville)	Democratic	January 1, 2015 – October 2020	Elected in 2014. Reelected in 2016. Reelected in 2018. Resigned to become Kentucky; State Parks Commissioner.	2015–2023
Matt Lockett (Nicholasville)	Republican	January 1, 2021 – present	Elected in 2020. Reelected in 2022. Reelected in 2024. Lost reelection.	2015–2023
Matt Lockett (Nicholasville)	Republican	January 1, 2021 – present	Elected in 2020. Reelected in 2022. Reelected in 2024. Lost reelection.	2023–present
Ryan Stanford (Nicholasville)	Democratic	Assuming office January 1, 2027	Elected in 2026.	2023–present
