= Gus Sheehan =

American politician

Member of the Kentucky Senate from the 23rd district
- In office January 1, 1972 – January 1, 1989
- Preceded by: Pearl Strong (redistricting)
- Succeeded by: Joseph U. Meyer

Member of the Kentucky House of Representatives from the 66th district
- In office January 1, 1964 – January 1, 1968
- Preceded by: Herbert F. Fern (redistricting)
- Succeeded by: Carl J. Mershon

Commonwealth's Attorney of the 16th Kentucky Circuit Court
- In office March 5, 1958 – November 1958
- Appointed by: Happy Chandler
- Preceded by: James E. Quill
- Succeeded by: John J. O'Hara

Member of the Kentucky House of Representatives from the 61st district
- In office January 1, 1950 – January 1, 1954
- Preceded by: George W. Steinford
- Succeeded by: Thomas P. Fitzpatrick

Personal details
- Born: April 30, 1917
- Died: October 29, 2000 (aged 83)
- Party: Democratic
- Children: 4, including Martin

August Frederick Sheehan Jr. (April 30, 1917 – October 29, 2000) was an American politician from Covington, Kentucky, who was a member of both houses of the Kentucky General Assembly.

Sheehan first served four terms in the Kentucky House of Representatives from 1950 to 1954 and again from 1964 to 1968. In 1958, he was appointed the Commonwealth's Attorney for Kenton County, losing reelection election later that year. In 1971, Sheehan was elected to the Kentucky Senate after redistricting moved the 23rd district from eastern to northern Kentucky. He won reelection to the senate three times but was defeated for renomination in 1988 by Joseph U. Meyer.

Sheehan died on October 29, 2000.
