= Eleanor Jordan =

American politician (born 1953)

Member of the Kentucky House of Representatives from the 42nd district
- In office February 22, 1996 – January 1, 2001
- Preceded by: Leonard Gray
- Succeeded by: Reginald Meeks

Personal details
- Born: May 18, 1953 (age 73)
- Party: Democratic

Eleanor Allen Jordan (born May 18, 1953) is an American politician who served in the Kentucky House of Representatives from 1996 to 2001 before becoming the Executive Director of the Kentucky Commission on Women.

== Politics ==
Jordan won a special election for her House seat in February 1996 and won the general election in November, as well as re-election in 1998. In 2000, she ran for Kentucky's Third Congressional District in the United States House of Representatives but lost against the incumbent, though she "raised more than $1.7 million, engaged scores of volunteers, and attracted national attention," including endorsements from President Bill Clinton, New Jersey Senator Bill Bradley, former Texas Governor Ann Richards, and 35 members of Congress, who traveled to Louisville to make the endorsements. She was the state's first black candidate for Congress or any national office.

In 2001, Governor Paul E. Patton appointed her executive director of the Office of the Ombudsman for the Cabinet for Families and Children.

During the 2000s, Jordan began caucusing with other female legislators, including Joni Jenkins, Susan Johns, Ruth Ann Palumbo, Mary Lou Marzian, and Kathy Stein, in order to track legislation in their individual fields of expertise and work together to affect legislation more easily than they could have done alone. One early victory involved "building statewide opposition to a bill that, before their organized effort, likely would have gone unnoticed and passed easily, [...] removing the requirement that educational institutions offer women's softball as well as men's baseball, violating the spirit if not the letter of Title IX."

== Personal life and education ==
Jordan was born in Louisville, Kentucky, on May 18, 1953. She attended the University of Kentucky and Western Kentucky University. She is a member of the Alpha Kappa Alpha sorority and the NAACP, and she has worked with the Council of State Governments and various organizations related to child care, education, libraries, and churches.

== Election results ==
Kentucky's 3rd Congressional District General Election (2000)
Party	Candidate	Votes	%
Republican	Anne Northup (Incumbent)	142,106	52.87
Democratic	Eleanor Jordon	118,875	44.23
Libertarian	Donna Walker Mancini	7,804	2.90
Total votes		268,785	100.00
Turnout			67.9
Republican hold			
