= John J. O'Hara (judge) =

American judge (1922–1997)

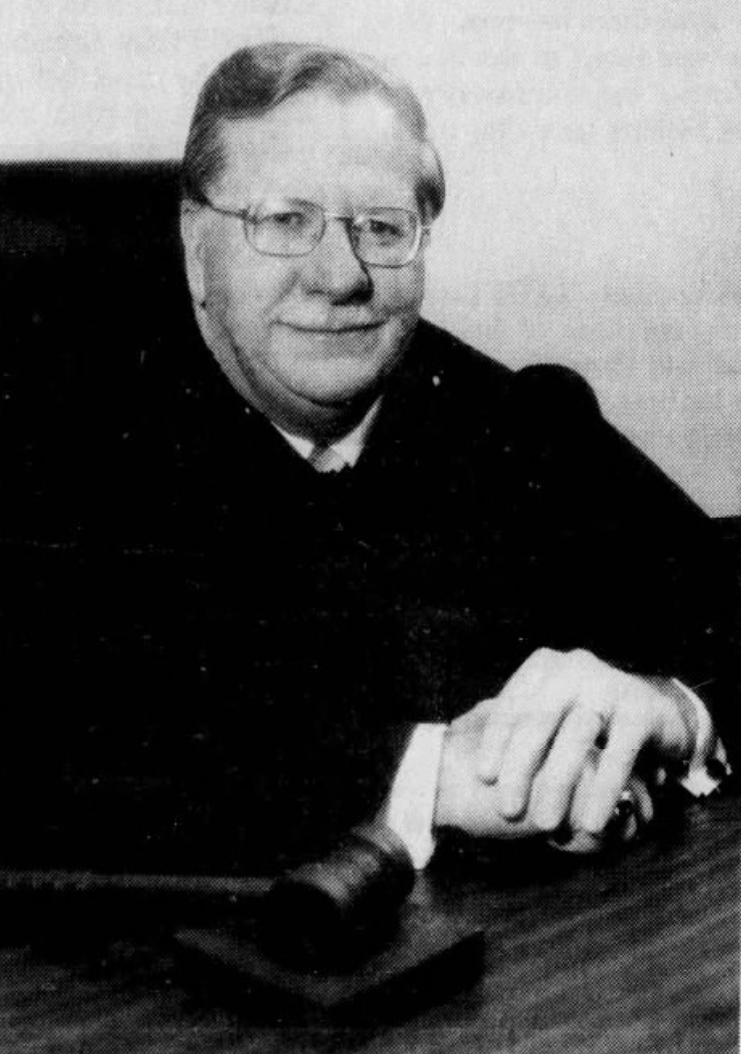
- O'Hara, c. 1982

Justice of the Kentucky Supreme Court
- In office March 25, 1982 – January 3, 1983
- Appointed by: John Y. Brown Jr.
- Preceded by: Robert O. Lukowsky
- Succeeded by: Donald C. Wintersheimer

Commonwealth's Attorney of the 16th Kentucky Circuit Court
- In office November 1958 – January 5, 1976
- Preceded by: Gus Sheehan
- Succeeded by: Frank Trusty

President of the Kentucky Bar Association
- In office July 1, 1971 – July 1, 1972
- Preceded by: Allen Schmitt
- Succeeded by: William E. Rummage

Personal details
- Born: John Jerald O'Hara; October 1, 1922 Covington, Kentucky
- Died: December 7, 1997 (aged 75) Edgewood, Kentucky
- Resting place: St. Mary Cemetery; Fort Mitchell, Kentucky
- Party: Democratic
- Education: Xavier University (PhB); University of Kentucky (LLB)

Military service
- Allegiance: United States
- Branch/service: United States Army
- Battles/wars: World War II

John Jerald "Jay" O'Hara (October 1, 1922 – December 7, 1997) was an American attorney and jurist from Kentucky who served as justice of the Kentucky Supreme Court from 1982 to 1983. He previously served as commonwealth's attorney for Kentucky's 16th Judicial circuit from 1958 to 1976.

== Early life and education ==
John Jerald O'Hara was born on October 1, 1922, in Covington, Kentucky. His father was a native of Covington who had a career in the tobacco industry, most notably with the United States Department of Agriculture's tobacco division, as well as operated a Ford car dealership.

While O'Hara had almost always aspired to be an attorney, his education was interrupted by World War II, and he joined the U.S. Army. He received an injury during his service, and was treated at a hospital in Louisville, where he met and entered a relationship with Dorothy Arnold, a nurse from Idaho. After the war, the two married and moved to Covington, where they would go on to have seven children.

After moving to Covington, O'Hara attended Xavier University. He played for the Xavier Musketeers men's basketball team and served as president of the student council before graduating with a Bachelor of Philosophy degree in January 1947. He afterwards attended the University of Kentucky College of Law, where he was inducted as a member of Phi Alpha Delta and graduated with a Bachelor of Laws degree in 1949. He was admitted to the Kentucky bar that same year.

== Career ==
=== Early career ===
O'Hara practiced law in Covington as a partner of the firm O'Hara, Ruberg, Cetrulo, and Osborne while also rising to prominence within the Kentucky Bar Association, being elected vice president of the young lawyer's division in 1951. He also served as secretary of the Kenton County election commission in 1953, and secretary of the Kenton County Bar Association in 1955.

=== Commonwealth's attorney ===
In 1958, O'Hara challenged incumbent Gus Sheehan for commonwealth's attorney of Kentucky's 16th Judicial circuit. Sheehan had been appointed to the position by Governor A. B. "Happy" Chandler earlier in the year due to the death of incumbent James E. Quill. As such, in addition to his support from younger Democrats, O'Hara also garnered the support of the party's anti-Chandler faction. Ultimately, he defeated Sheehan in the Democratic primary for the special election, which was viewed in conjunction with other Chandler ally loses across the state as a blow to the governor's influence.

During his tenure, O'Hara frequently made public speaking engagements with high schools, colleges, and civic groups to speak against illicit drug use in Kentucky, Indiana, and Ohio. He also was elected to various leadership positions in both state and national organizations, including state chairman and fellow of the American College of Trial Lawyers, president of the Kentucky Commonwealth's Attorneys Association, president of the Kentucky Bar Association, and president of the National District Attorneys Association. During his time with the NDAA, he proposed a crime victim-witness assistance program pilot program, which was eventually opened offices in eight cities across the country, including Covington. He also testified before the U.S. Senate Judiciary Subcommittee on the Constitution in support of media outlets being permitted to maintain the anonymity of certain sources.

A number of the cases he prosecuted garnered notable local and statewide media attention. In 1959, he successfully convicted a 56-year-old grandmother for the murder of her husband's mistress, who she had shot to death at a bus stop in Covington. In O'Hara's closing argument however, he stated that women who were native to Breathitt County, such as the defendant, viewed guns the same way that women in Kenton County viewed forks and knives. A notice published soon after in an eastern Kentucky newspaper demanded that he apologize for his "vile, slanderous remark[s]," and compared him to the Roman emperor Nero for "casting declamation upon the character of some seven thousand women in order to swell his own ego by using any means to bring about a conviction." No public apology seems to have been published, and despite seeking the death penalty, the defendant was sentenced to life imprisonment.

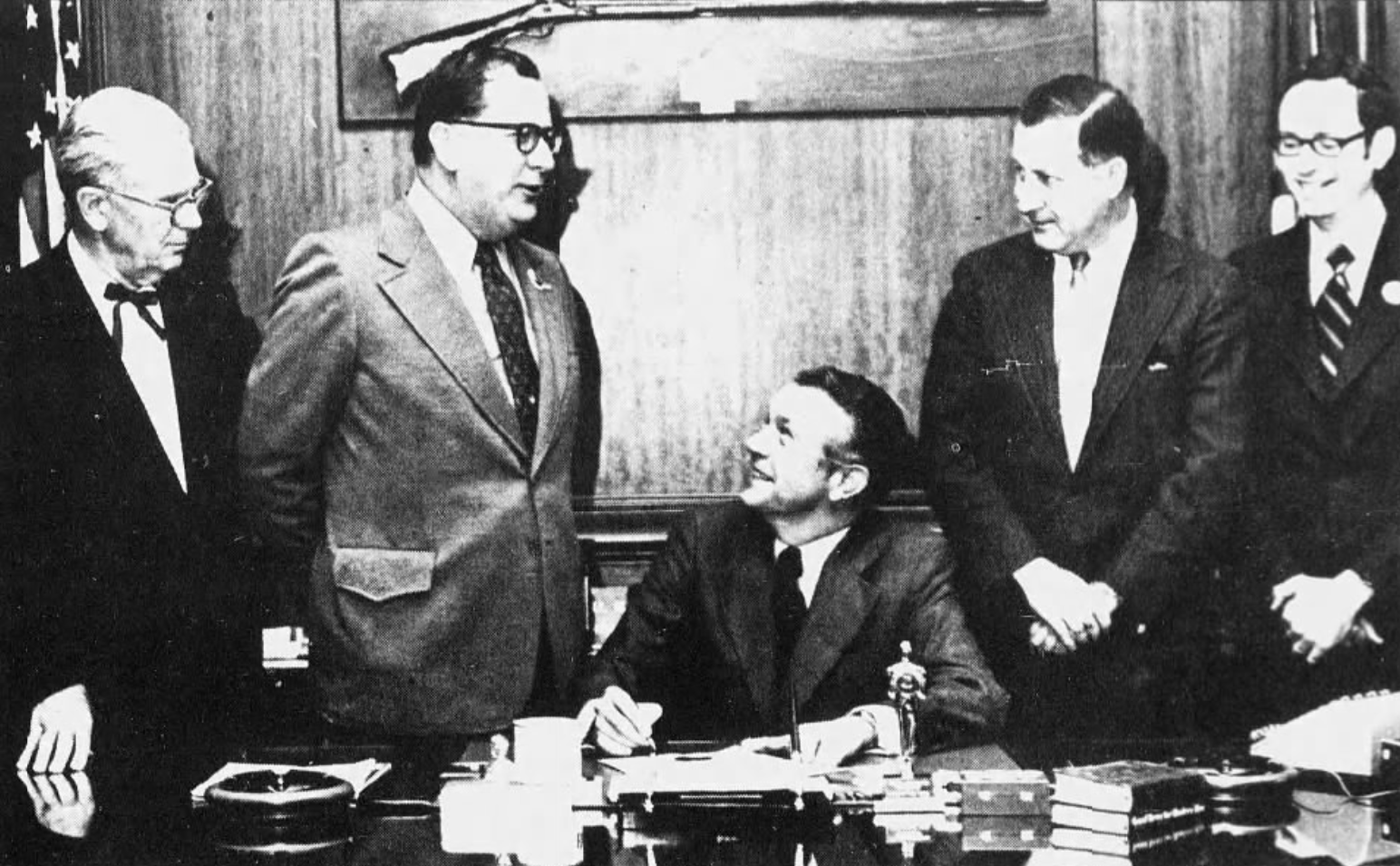
O'Hara (second from left) with Governor Wendell Ford (seated) during his tenure as president of the Kentucky Bar Association.

In 1966, he oversaw the indictment and subsequent trials of three Covington city commissioners who were accused of accepting and soliciting bribes. Spurred by Covington Mayor Bernard Eichholz, who had been tipped off regarding "irregularities," the summer long investigation culminated in O'Hara calling over twenty witnesses to testify before a grand jury, including state representative James E. Murphy. Ultimately however, all three commissioners were acquitted.

Following the opening of a Covington abortion clinic in 1973, the city engineer cited its operators for a number of code and licensure violations. O'Hara, who openly stated his opposition to the recent Roe v. Wade decision, summoned a grand jury to hear testimony from the clinic's director and to inspect the structure themselves, despite declaring their intent was not to seek indictments. When the grand jury returned a report which alleged that the clinic was being operated in "a highly unusual manner" and recommended that the Kentucky Medical Association investigate, the clinic's director accused O'Hara of manipulation.

Later that year, O'Hara filed suit against a drive-in theater to prevent their screening of R-rated and X-rated movies as a public nuisance. He ultimately was successful in obtaining a permanent injunction to stop the showings due to the theater's screen being visible to drivers on I-75.

In 1975, O'Hara chose not to seek reelection.

=== Political activities ===
After leaving his position as commonwealth's attorney, O'Hara remained active in politics. In January 1976, he called for a convention to be held to select a Democratic nominee to challenge incumbent Republican congressman Gene Snyder, and expressed his intent to seek that nomination. However, no convention was held, and he was not a candidate in the Democratic primary. When three new federal judgeship were created for the Eastern District of Kentucky in 1978, O'Hara was frequently mentioned as a likely appointee. However, he was passed over by the commission tasked with recommending potential candidates. He was the northern Kentucky coordinator for John Y. Brown Jr.'s 1979 gubernatorial campaign. When U.S. Senator Ted Kennedy sought to make connections in Kentucky in anticipation for his 1980 presidential campaign, O'Hara was one of the individuals he contacted.

Also during this time, he served in a number of appointed positions, including on the Governor's Commission on Product Liability and the Kentucky Harness Racing Commission.

=== Kentucky Supreme Court ===
In December 1981, Justice Robert O. Lukowsky of the Kentucky Supreme Court died. In March of the following year, Governor John Y. Brown Jr. appointed O'Hara to the unexpired term. In accepting the nomination, he noted that he and Lukowsky were admitted to the bar on the same day in 1949.

He served on the court for less than a year, as he was defeated for reelection by Donald C. Wintersheimer, a judge who had served as a member of the Kentucky Court of Appeals since its changes under the judicial article of 1976. After leaving the court, O'Hara was appointed by Brown to the Kentucky Board of Tax Appeals.

== Later life and death ==
O'Hara prominently promoted his Irish ancestry, and served as president of the Friendly Sons of St. Patrick from 1990 to 1991. A columnist noted that he treated everyday like Saint Patricks Day, as he sometimes wore green suits to court and bright green pants while golfing.

O'Hara was diagnosed with prostate cancer around 1990. He died at his home in Edgewood, Kentucky, seven years later, at the age of 75.

Political offices
Preceded by Robert O. Lukowsky	Justice of the Kentucky Supreme Court; 1982–1983	Succeeded by Donald C. Wintersheimer
