= Boyce G. Clayton =

American judge (1929–2020)

Judge of the Kentucky Court of Appeals
- In office January 2, 1984 – January 7, 1992
- Preceded by: Bill Paxton
- Succeeded by: Rick Johnson

Justice of the Kentucky Supreme Court
- In office January 1, 1976 – January 3, 1983
- Preceded by: Court established
- Succeeded by: Roy N. Vance

Justice of the Kentucky Court of Appeals
- In office January 6, 1975 – December 31, 1975
- Preceded by: Earl T. Osborne
- Succeeded by: Court became Supreme Court

Commonwealth's Attorney of the 42nd Kentucky Circuit Court
- In office November 25, 1968 – November 7, 1974
- Preceded by: Richard Peek
- Succeeded by: Maurice R. Christopher

Personal details
- Born: October 22, 1929
- Died: March 15, 2020 (aged 90)
- Party: Democratic

Boyce G. Clayton (October 22, 1929 – March 15, 2020) was a justice of the Kentucky's top courts from 1975 to 1983, serving on the Kentucky Court of Appeals from 1975 to 1976, and on the newly created Kentucky Supreme Court from 1976 to 1983.

== Early life, education, and career ==
Born in Birmingham, Alabama, he attended Benton High School and served in the United States Army after World War II. He graduated from Murray State University and briefly taught in Metropolis, Illinois, and then at Waggerner High School, in Kentucky, while pursuing his J.D. at the University of Louisville School of Law. He gained admission to the bar in Kentucky in 1960, and became Prosecuting Attorney for the city of Mayfield, Kentucky. In October 1972 he was initiated into the Benevolent and Protective Order of Elks with 11 others. In 1968, he was elected as the Commonwealth's Attorney for the 42nd circuit. He was a Democrat.

== Judicial Service ==
In 1974, Clayton defeated incumbent Justice Earl T. Osborne in the Democratic primary for a seat on the Kentucky Court of Appeals, which was the highest court in Kentuc at the time. He took office on January 6, 1975. On January 1, 1976, Clayton and the six other Justices of the Court of Appeals were automatically elevated to the newly formed Kentucky Supreme Court. In 1982, he lost the position to Roy N. Vance in the nonpartisan general election, and left office on January 3, 1983.

In 1983, he ran to join the Kentucky Court of Appeals, defeating incumbent judge Bill Paxton. In 1991, he was defeated for a second term by Rick Johnson. After concluding his judicial service, he was the City Attorney for Benton, Kentucky for four years, until he retired from practice.

== Personal life and death ==
Clayton's wife died before him, and he was survived by two daughters.

He died at Oakview Manor Healthcare Center in Calvert City, Kentucky, at the age of 90.

== Electoral history ==
May 28, 1974 primary election: Kentucky Court of Appeals
Primary election
| Party | Candidate | Votes | % |
|---|---|---|---|
| Democratic | Boyce G. Clayton | 25,651 | 52.9 |
| Democratic | Earl T. Osborne | 22,840 | 47.1 |

November 2, 1982 general election: Kentucky Supreme Court
| Candidate | Votes | % |
|---|---|---|
| Roy N. Vance | 27,127 | 56.2 |
| Boyce G. Clayton | 21,111 | 43.8 |

Political offices
| Preceded by Earl T. Osborne | Justice of the Kentucky Court of Appeals; 1975–1976 | Succeeded by court reorganized |
| Preceded by newly established court | Justice of the Kentucky Supreme Court; 1976–1983 | Succeeded by Roy N. Vance |
