= 2014 Lexington, Kentucky mayoral election =

- November 4, 2014
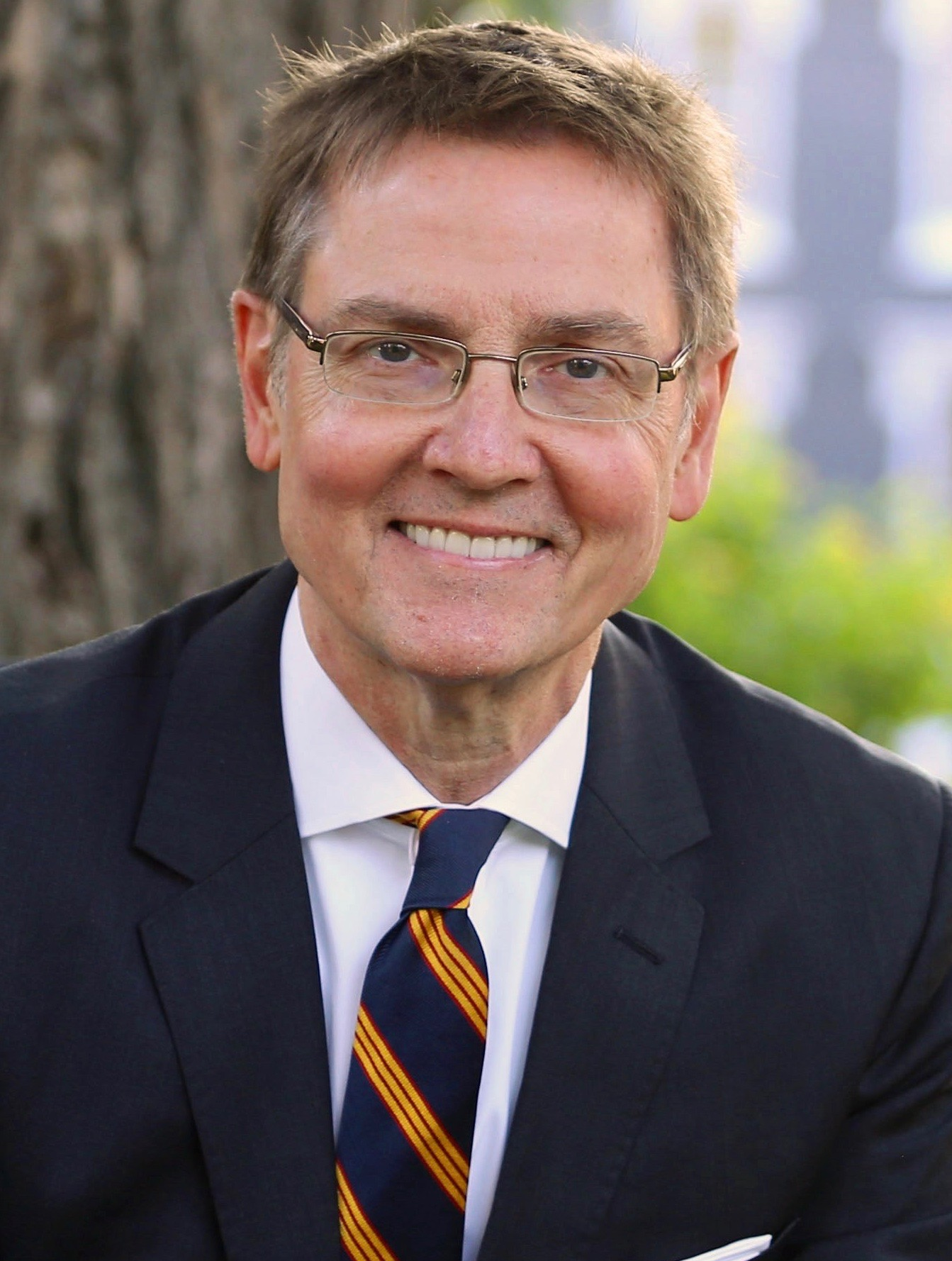

Candidate	Jim Gray	Anthany Beatty Sr.
Popular vote	57,897	30,854
Percentage	65.24%	34.76%
Mayor before election
Jim Gray
Democratic
Elected mayor
Jim Gray
Democratic

Lexington, Kentucky held nonpartisan elections for mayor and city council on November 4, 2014. The primary election took place on May 20, 2014, and the deadline for candidates wishing to run in this election had to file for candidacy before January 28, 2014. Urban development and crime were major issues that were brought up in the election that shaped the 2014 election cycle. It saw the reelection of incumbent mayor Jim Gray.

Gray defeated Anthany Beatty Sr. to win his second term. He was the first Lexington mayor to win reelection since Pam Miller in 1998. The night Jim Gray won, he gave a speech at his election party telling his supporters that he was grateful for Lexington's strong support.

Primary Results
Candidate	Votes	%
Jim Gray (incumbent)	25,439	56.6%
Anthany Beatty Sr.	17,033	37.9%
Danny Mayer	2,459	5.5%
Total votes	44,931	100%

General Election Results
Candidate	Votes	%
Jim Gray (incumbent)	57,897	65.2%
Anthany Beatty Sr.	30,854	34.8%
Total votes	88,751	100%
