= Robert Damron (politician) =

American investment banker and politician

Majority Caucus Chair of the Kentucky House of Representatives
- In office January 6, 2009 – January 8, 2013
- Preceded by: Charlie Hoffman
- Succeeded by: Sannie Overly
- In office January 4, 2005 – January 2, 2007
- Preceded by: Jim Callahan
- Succeeded by: Charlie Hoffman

Member of the Kentucky House of Representatives from the 39th district
- In office January 1, 1993 – January 1, 2015
- Preceded by: William Strong (redistricting)
- Succeeded by: Russ Meyer

Personal details
- Born: June 20, 1954 (age 72)
- Party: Republican (since 2015); Democratic (until 2015)
- Education: University of Kentucky
- Occupation: Investment banker

Robert R. Damron (born June 20, 1954) is an American investment banker and politician from the Commonwealth of Kentucky. Affiliated with the Democratic Party, Damron was a member of the Kentucky House of Representatives from 1993 until 2015, representing the 39th district. He served as the House Majority Caucus Chair for 4 years before being unseated from his leadership position by Sannie Overly.

He announced that he would not seek re-election to the state House in 2014, and would instead run for Judge/Executive of Jessamine County, as incumbent William Neal Cassity was not running for reelection. He then lost the election to Republican David West. Shortly afterwards, he switched parties and became a Republican, stating that the national Democratic Party did not represent his values.
