= Roy N. Vance =

American judge (1921–2007)

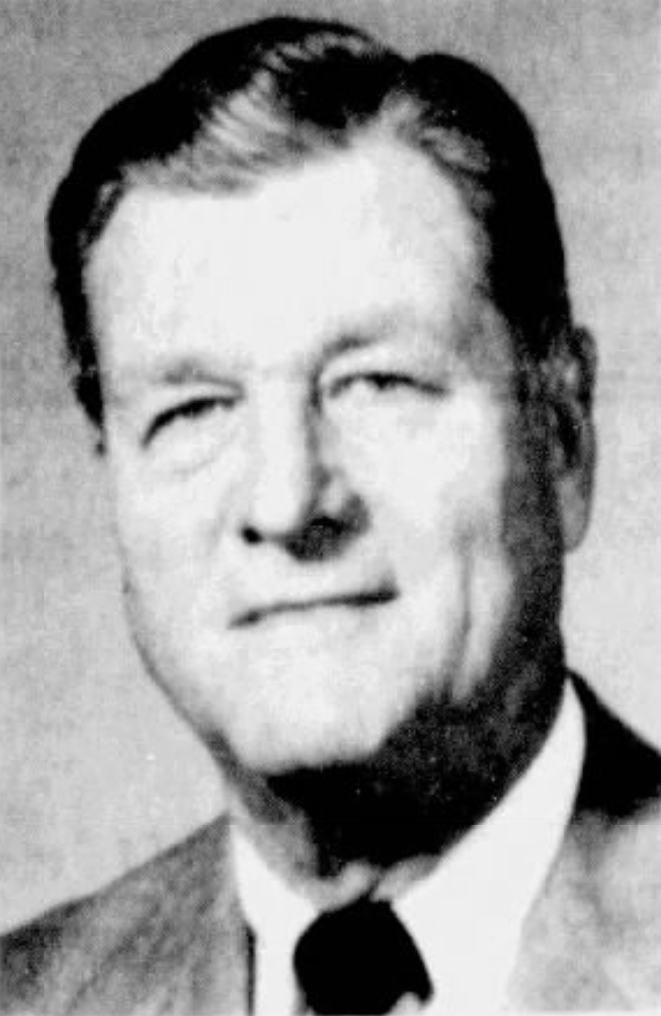
- Vance, c. 1982

Justice of the Kentucky Supreme Court
- In office January 3, 1983 – January 7, 1991
- Preceded by: Boyce G. Clayton
- Succeeded by: Thomas B. Spain

Judge of the Kentucky Court of Appeals
- In office August 19, 1976 – January 3, 1983
- Preceded by: Court established
- Succeeded by: Bill Paxton

Commonwealth's Attorney of the 2nd Kentucky Circuit Court
- In office November 28, 1953 – January 6, 1958
- Preceded by: Mahlon Shelbourne
- Succeeded by: James Moore

McCracken County Attorney
- In office January 2, 1950 – November 28, 1953
- Preceded by: John Kirksey
- Succeeded by: Pelham McMurry

Personal details
- Born: November 14, 1921 McCracken County, Kentucky
- Died: January 17, 2007 (aged 85) Vero Beach, Florida
- Education: University of Kentucky College of Law
- Profession: Attorney

Roy Newton Vance Jr. (November 14, 1921 – January 17, 2007) was a justice of the Kentucky Supreme Court from 1983 to 1991.

Vance was born in McCracken County, Kentucky. He graduated from the University of Kentucky law school and joined the army. Due to a special statute, he was the only person admitted to the state bar before the age of 21. Vance served as McCracken County Attorney from 1950 to 1953, then as Commonwealth's Attorney from 1953 to 1958. He was commissioner for the old Court of Appeals from 1970 to 1976, when he became a judge on the court when it was created in a constitutional amendment. He served in this capacity until joining the state supreme court in 1983.

Vance died on January 17, 2007, in Vero Beach, Florida. He is survived by his wife Euleen; two daughters, Linda and Terry; and a son, Newton.
