= Michelle M. Keller =

American judge (born 1960)

Michelle Keller

Justice of the Kentucky Supreme Court
- Incumbent
- Assumed office April 3, 2013
- Preceded by: Wilfrid Schroder

Judge of the Kentucky Court of Appeals
- In office January 1, 2007 – April 3, 2013
- Preceded by: Daniel T. Guidugli
- Succeeded by: Allison Jones

Personal details
- Born: 1960 (age 65–66) Fort Mitchell, Kentucky, U.S.
- Education: Northern Kentucky University (AA, BS, JD)

Michelle Meier Keller (born 1960) is an American lawyer who has served as a justice of the Kentucky Supreme Court since 2013.

== Biography ==
Keller was born and raised in Fort Mitchell, Kentucky. She attended Northern Kentucky University, where she completed an associate's degree in nursing in 1980, a Bachelor of Science degree in 1985, and a Juris Doctor degree in 1990, at the Salmon P. Chase College of Law.

Keller worked in private practice as a criminal defense lawyer, and as an assistant county prosecutor. She was elected as a state judge on the Kentucky Court of Appeals for the 6th appellate district in November 2006, defeating rival Owen Kennedy by 63% to 37%.

The Governor of Kentucky Steve Beshear appointed Keller to the Supreme Court of Kentucky in April 2013, to replace retired justice Wilfrid Schroder. Keller represents the 6th Supreme Court district, which covers 21 counties in Northern Kentucky. She was re-elected to a new eight-year term in November 2014, defeating challenger Teresa Cunningham by 58% to 42%. In 2022, Keller won an election challenge by Joseph Fischer. Her current term expires on January 6, 2031.

The honors Keller has received include a Donated Legal Services Award from the Kentucky Bar Association in 2009 for her pro bono work, was named Outstanding Woman of Northern Kentucky in 2012, received the Richard D. Lawrence Lifetime Achievement Award from the Northern Kentucky Bar Association in 2013 and the Liberty Bell Award in 2014, the Distinguished Lawyer of the Year Award in 2017, and received a Distinguished Judge Award in 2020.

Legal offices
Preceded by Wilfrid Schroder	Justice of the Kentucky Supreme Court; 2013–present	Incumbent
