= Salmon P. Chase College of Law =

Law school in Highland Heights, Kentucky, US

NKU Salmon P. Chase College of Law
- Parent school: Northern Kentucky University
- Established: 1893; 133 years ago
- School type: Public law school
- Dean: Judith Daar
- Location: Highland Heights, Kentucky, United States; 39.0309°N 84.4649°W
- Enrollment: 369
- Faculty: 24 (Full-time); 42 (Part-time)
- USNWR ranking: 131st, 63rd for part-time
- Bar pass rate: 81.61% (First-time takers 2023)
- Website: chaselaw.nku.edu

The NKU Salmon P. Chase College of Law (formerly Salmon P. Chase College of Law, also known as Chase College of Law) is the law school of Northern Kentucky University, a public university in Highland Heights, Kentucky. It provides both part-time (day and evening) and full-time programs of study that lead to a Juris Doctor (J.D.) degree, as well as joint degrees in JD/Master of Business Administration, JD/Master of Health Informatics, and JD/Master of Business Informatics. The law school also has a program that leads to an LLM degree in U.S. law that is designed for internationally trained lawyers, and a program that leads to a MLS degree designed for individuals interested in developing a better understanding of the law as it affects their careers involving legal or regulatory issues.

== History ==
The law school was founded in 1893 and accredited by the American Bar Association in 1959. The school was named for U.S. Chief Justice, Salmon P. Chase, who was appointed to the Supreme Court by President Abraham Lincoln in 1864. Prior to his appointment, Chase was one of the most prominent politicians of the mid-19th century, serving as a U.S. senator from Ohio, the governor of Ohio, and the Secretary of the Treasury under Lincoln. He began practicing law in Cincinnati in 1830, and became an advocate for abolition and the anti-slavery movement, lending his skills to the cause of fugitive slaves, often free of charge. He spoke passionately on behalf of African Americans when their status and rights were not recognized and became known as the "attorney general of runaway slaves" for his frequent defense of slaves and those who harbored them. In 2013, members of Chase's family presented the Cincinnati Museum Center with a sterling silver pitcher given to him in 1845 by a group of grateful African Americans.

The Salmon P. Chase College of Law was initially founded as an evening law school affiliated with the Cincinnati YMCA. Classes were held in the YMCA building on Central Parkway in downtown Cincinnati from 1917 to 1972. In 1971, Chase crossed the Ohio River and merged into the Kentucky state university system by becoming a part of Northern Kentucky University (then "Northern Kentucky State College"). During summer 1972, the law school moved from downtown Cincinnati across the Ohio River to NKU's Covington campus. In 1981, Chase moved to its present location on the NKU campus in Highland Heights, remaining within the Cincinnati/Northern Kentucky metropolitan area. In 2006, the college of law was rebranded NKU Salmon P. Chase College of Law. Chase has a student/professor ratio of nine to one.

== Admissions ==
For the class entering in 2023, the law school accepted 71.91% of applicants, with 34.63% of those accepted enrolling. The average enrollee had a 152 LSAT score and 3.38 undergraduate GPA.

== Bar examination passage ==
In 2023, the overall bar examination passage rate for the law school's first-time examination takers was 81.61%. The Ultimate Bar Pass Rate, which the ABA defines as the passage rate for graduates who sat for bar examinations within two years of graduating, was 93.33% for the class of 2021.

== Employment ==
According to the schools's official ABA-required disclosures for 2022 graduates, within ten months after graduation 64.66% of the 116 graduating class was employed in full-time positions requiring bar passage (i.e. as attorneys), with 13.79% employed in full-time JD advantage positions. Positions were in various size law firms, most being in 1-10 attorney firms, four graduates obtained local and state judicial clerkships, and 45 public interest, government, and business employment.

== Notable alumni ==
- Nancy L. Allf (JD 1982), former judge, Eighth Judicial District Court of Nevada, Clark County
- Joe Cunningham (JD 2014), former member of the U.S. House of Representatives from South Carolina's 1st district.
- John H. Druffel (attended 1911), former judge, United States District Court for the Southern District of Ohio (deceased)
- Charles H. Elston (LL.B 1914) former member of the U.S. House of Representative from Ohio (deceased)
- Michelle M. Keller (JD 1990), justice, Kentucky Supreme Court
- Robert Ruwe (JD 1970), former senior status judge of the United States Tax Court (deceased)
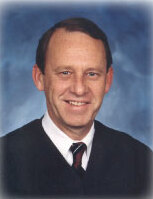
Timothy Black (JD 1983), senior status United States federal judge, United States District Court for the Southern District of Ohio

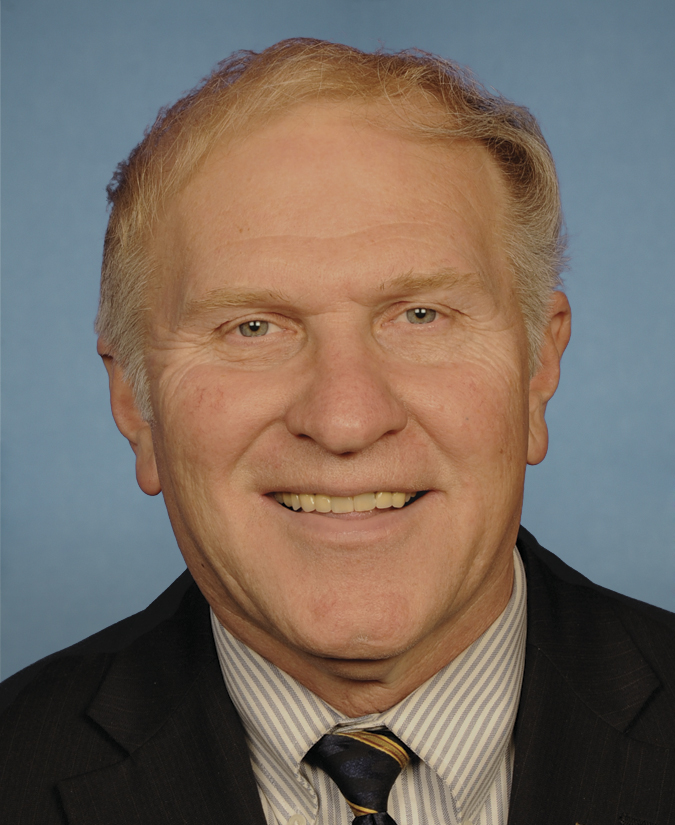
Steve Chabot (JD 1978), former U.S. Representative of Ohio

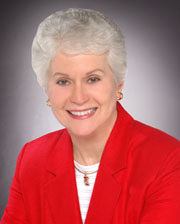
Patricia L. Herbold (JD 1977), former U.S. Ambassador to the Republic of Singapore and philanthropist

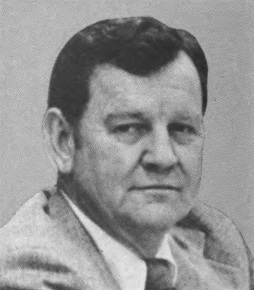
Tom Luken (LL.B 1950), former U.S. Representative of Ohio

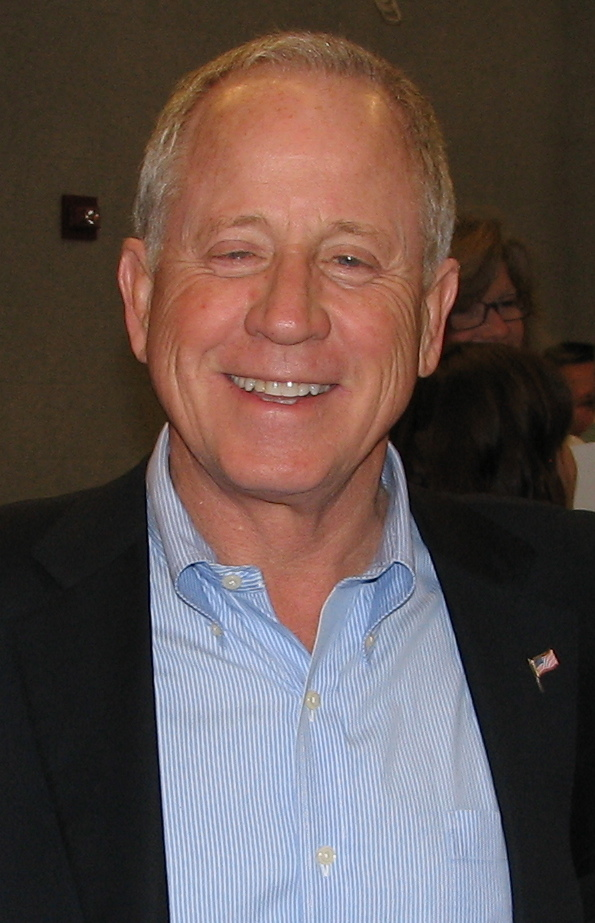
W. Bruce Lunsford (JD 1974), attorney, businessman, and politician

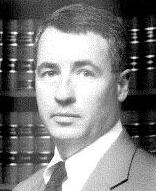
Danny C. Reeves (JD 1981), senior status United States federal judge, United States District Court for the Eastern District of Kentucky
