= List of justices of the Kentucky Supreme Court =

Following is a list of persons who have served as justices of the Kentucky Supreme Court in its various forms since 1792.

== 1792–1850 ==
Justice	Began active service	End of active service	Chief Justice start	Chief Justice end	Appointed by
Harry Innes	1792	1792			Isaac Shelby
Benjamin Sebastian	1792	1806			Isaac Shelby
Caleb Wallace	1792	1813			Isaac Shelby
George Muter	1792	1806	1792	1806	Isaac Shelby
Thomas Todd	1801	1807	1806	1807	James Garrard
Felix Grundy	1806	1808	1807	1808	Christopher Greenup
Ninian Edwards	1806	1809	1808	1809	Christopher Greenup
Robert Trimble	1807	1809			Christopher Greenup
William I. Logan	1808	1810; 1818			
George M. Bibb	1808; 1827	1809; 1828			
John Boyle	1809	1827	1810	1827	Charles Scott
James Clark	1810	1812			Charles Scott
William Owsley	1812	1828			
John Rowan	1819	1821			Gabriel Slaughter
Benjamin Mills	1820	1828			
William T. Barry	1825	1826 (Note: Justice of the New Court; tenure nullified December 1826)	1825	1826 (Note: Chief Justice of the New Court; tenure nullified December 1826)	Joseph Desha
James Haggin	1825	1826 (Note: Justice of the New Court; tenure nullified December 1826)			Joseph Desha
John Trimble	1825	1826 (Note: Justice of the New Court; tenure nullified December 1826)			Joseph Desha
Benjamin W. Patton	1825	1825 (Note: Justice of the New Court; tenure nullified December 1826)			Joseph Desha
Rezin Davidge	1825	1826 (Note: Justice of the New Court; tenure nullified December 1826)			Joseph Desha
John Telemachus Johnson	1826	1826 (Note: Justice of the New Court; tenure nullified December 1826)			Joseph Desha
George Robertson	1828; 1864*	1842; 1871	1829; 1870	1842; 1871	
Joseph R. Underwood	1828	1834			
R. A. Buckner	1829	1832			Thomas Metcalfe
Samuel Smith Nicholas	1831	1837			Thomas Metcalfe
Iphraim M. Ewing	1835	1846	1843	1846	
John Chambers	1835	-	-		James T. Morehead
Thomas A. Marshall	1835*	1856	1847; 1854; 1866	1851; 1856 -	James T. Morehead
Daniel Breck	1843	1849			
James Simpson	1847*	1860	1851; 1858	1852; 1860	
Asher W. Graham	1849	1851			

- *Elected to at least one term after 1850 reorganization

== 1850 reorganization ==
Justice	District	Political party	Began active service	End of active service	Chief Justice start	Chief Justice end
Thomas A. Marshall	2nd	Whig	1835	1856	1847; 1854; 1866	1851; 1856 -
James Simpson	1st	Independent	1847	1860	1851; 1858	1852; 1860
B. Mills Crenshaw	3rd	Whig	1851	1857	1856	1857
Elijah Hise	4th	Democratic	1851	1854	1852	1854
Henry J. Stites	4th	Democratic	1854	1862	1860	1862
Alvin Duvall	2nd	Democratic	1856	1864	1862	1864
Zachariah Wheat	3rd	Know Nothing	1857	1858	1857	1858
Henry C. Wood	3rd	Democratic	1858	1861		
Belvard J. Peters	1st	Democratic	1860	1876	1866; 1874	1868; 1876
Joshua Bullitt	3rd	Union Democratic	1861	1865	1864	1865
Rufus K. Williams	4th	Union Democratic	1862	1870	1868	1870
George Robertson	2nd	Union Democratic	1828; 1864	1842; 1871	1829; 1870	1842; 1871
William Sampson	3rd	Union Democratic	1865	1866	1865	1866
M. R. Hardin	3rd	Democratic	1866	1874	1872	1874
William Lindsay	4th	Democratic	1870	1878	1876	1878
William S. Pryor	2nd	Democratic	1871	1897*	1871; 1878; 1886; 1895	1872; 1880; 1888; 1897
Martin H. Cofer	3rd	Democratic	1874	1881	1880	1881
John Milton Elliott	1st	Democratic	1876	1879		
Thomas Hines	4th	Democratic	1878	1886	1884	1886
Thomas F. Hargis	1st	Democratic	1879	1884	1882	1884
Joseph Horace Lewis	3rd	Democratic	1881	1899*	1881; 1888; 1897	1882; 1890; 1899
William H. Holt	1st	Republican	1884	1893	1890	1893
Caswell Bennett	4th	Democratic	1886	1894	1893	1894
J. H. Hazelrigg	1st	Democratic	1893	1901*	1899	1901
Isaac M. Quigley	4th	Democratic	1894	1895	1894	1895

- *Continued as justice after 1895 reorganization

== 1895 reorganization ==
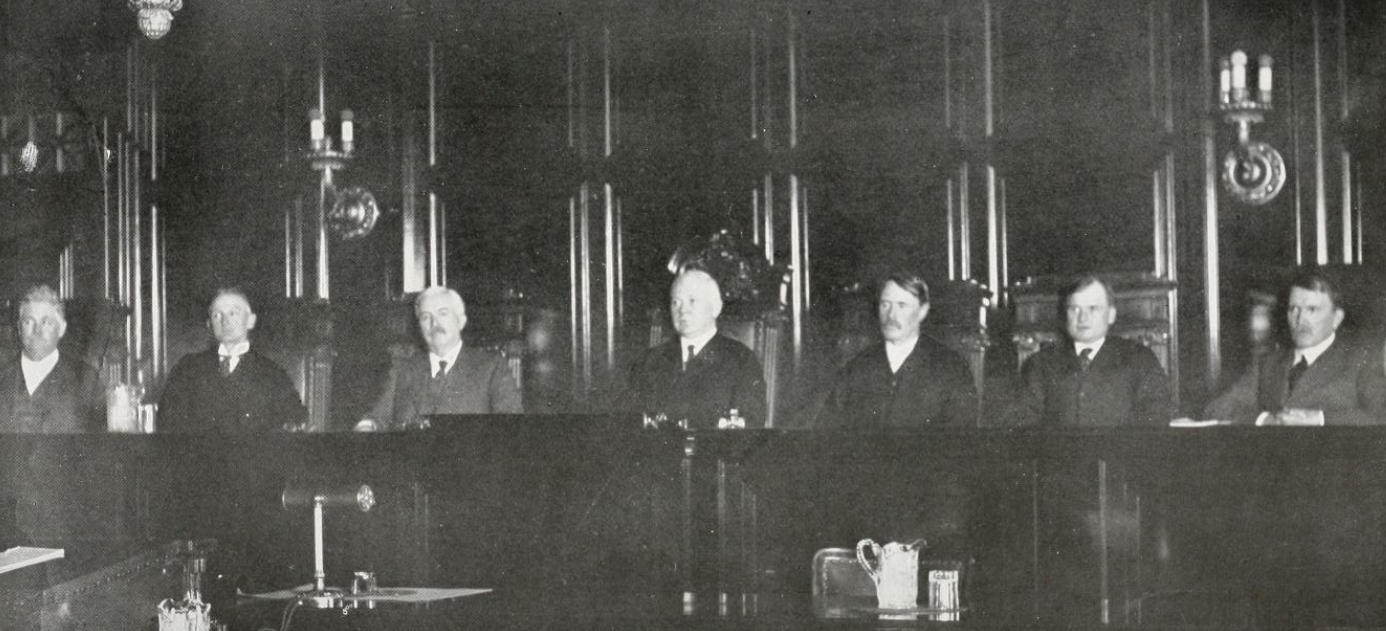
Kentucky Court of Appeals in session, c. 1915

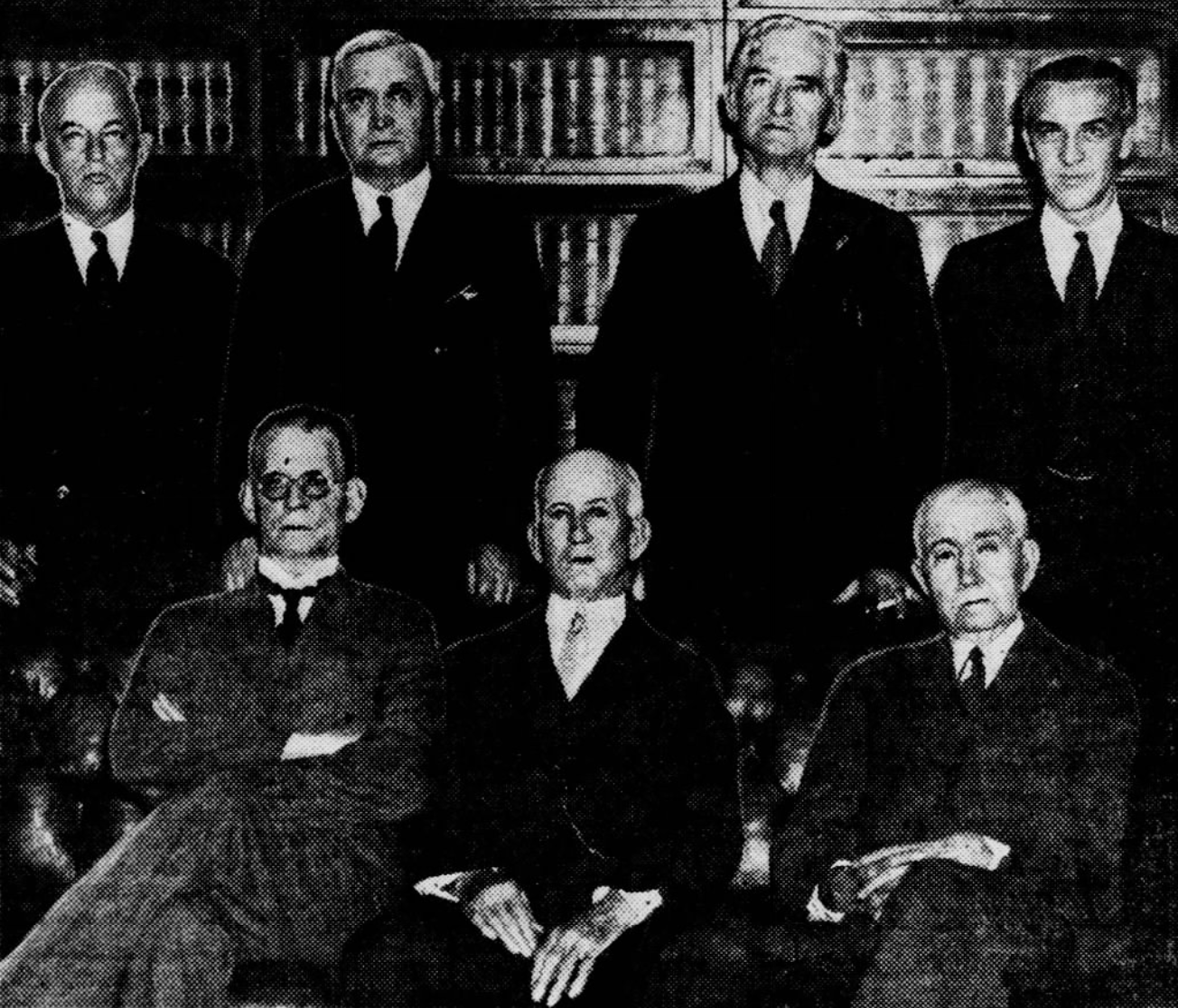
Justices of the Kentucky Court of Appeals, c. 1935

Justice	District	Political party	Began active service	End of active service	Chief Justice start	Chief Justice end
William S. Pryor	5th	Democratic	1871	1897	1871; 1878; 1886; 1895	1872; 1880; 1888; 1897
Joseph Horace Lewis	3rd	Democratic	1881	1899	1881; 1888; 1897	1882; 1890; 1899
J. H. Hazelrigg	7th	Democratic	1893	1901	1899	1901
John R. Grace	1st	Democratic	1895	1896		
B. L. D. Guffy	2nd	Republican	1895	1903	1902	1903
Sterling B. Toney	4th	Democratic	1895	-		
Thomas H. Paynter	6th	Democratic	1895	1906	1901	1902
George B. Estin	4th	Democratic	1895	1895		
George DuRelle	4th	Republican	1895	1903		
Joseph. I. Landes	1st	Republican	1896	1896		
James D. White	1st	Democratic	1896	1903		
A. R. Burnam	5th	Republican	1897	1905	1903	1905
John P. Hobson	3rd	Democratic	1899	1915	1905; 1911	1907; 1915
Edward C. O'Rear	7th	Republican	1901	1911	1907	1909
W. E. Settle	2nd	Democratic	1903	1927	1909; 1919	1917; 1925
Thomas Jefferson Nunn	1st	Democratic	1903	1914	1909	1910
Henry Stites Barker	4th	Democratic	1903	1911	1910	1911
James E. Cantrill	5th	Democratic	1905	1907		
John M. Lassing	6th	Democratic	1906	1913		
John D. Carroll	5th	Democratic	1907	1921	1919	1921
Shackelford Miller Sr.	4th	Democratic	1911	1919	1915	1917
Robert H. Winn	7th	Republican	1911	1912		
C. C. Turner	7th	Democratic	1912	1917		
J. B. Hannah	6th	Democratic	1913	1915		
Clement Singleton Nunn	1st	Democratic	1914	1915		
Rollin Hurt	3rd	Democratic	1915	1923	1921	1923
Ernest S. Clarke	6th	Democratic	1915	1926	1925	1926
Gus Thomas	1st	Democratic	1915	1951	1926; 1929; 1939	1927; 1931; 1939
Flem D. Sampson	7th	Republican	1917	1927	1923	1925
Huston Quin	4th	Republican	1919	1921		
William Rogers Clay	5th	Democratic	1921	1938	1927; 1935	1929; 1937
Charles Harwood Moorman	4th	Republican	1921	1923		
D. A. McCandless	3rd	Democratic	1923	1929	1929	1929
Henry W. Robinson	4th	Democratic	1923	1924		
Joseph T. O'Neal	4th	Democratic	1924	1924		
Richard Priest Dietzman	4th	Republican	1924	1935	1931	1933
C. W. Goodpaster	6th	Democratic	1926	1926		
William H. Rees	6th	Democratic	1926	1951	1933; 1941; 1945	1935; 1942; 1947
M. M. Logan	2nd	Democratic	1927	1931	1931	1931
Simeon Willis	7th	Republican	1928	1933		
William F. Grigsby	3rd	Republican	1929	1931		
Basil Richardson	3rd	Democratic	1931	1937	1937	1937
Andrew Jackson Bratcher	2nd	Republican	1931	1931		
Wesley Vick Perry	2nd	Democratic	1931	1943	1942	1943
Alex L. Ratliff	7th	Democratic	1933	1944	1937; 1939	1938; 1941
James W. Stites	4th	Democratic	1935	1939	1938	1939
Virgil H. Baird	3rd	Democratic	1937	1938		
James W. Cammack	5th	Democratic	1938	1958	1944; 1951	1945; 1953
Will H. Fulton	3rd	Democratic	1938	1944	1943	1944
Henry J. Tilford	4th	Democratic	1939	1945	1945	1945
Porter Sims	2nd	Democratic	1943	1959	1947; 1953	1951; 1954
E. Poe Harris	7th	Republican	1944	1945		
B. J. Bethurum	3rd	Republican	1944	1944		
Clyde B. Latimer	3rd	Republican	1944	1952		
Thomas S. Dawson	4th	Republican	1945	1947		
Eugene Siler	7th	Republican	1945	1949		
Thomas J. Knight	4th	Democratic	1947	1951		
Roy Helm	7th	Democratic	1949	1951		
James B. Milliken	6th	Democratic	1951	1975	1956; 1963; 1971	1957; 1964; 1973
John R. Moremen	4th	Democratic	1951	1967	1957; 1965	1964; 1966
Brady M. Stewart	1st	Democratic	1951	1967	1954; 1962	1956; 1963
Bert Combs	7th	Democratic	1951	1955		
Parker W. Duncan	3rd	Democratic	1952	1954		
Morris C. Montgomery	3rd	Democratic	1954	1969	1959; 1968	1960; 1969
Astor Hogg	7th	Democratic	1955	1957		
Robert B. Bird	7th	Republican	1957	1965	1960	1962
Amos H. Eblen	5th	Democratic	1958	1959		
Thomas E. Sandidge	2nd	Democratic	1959	1959		
Squire N. Williams Jr.	5th	Democratic	1959	1969	1967	1968
John S. Palmore	2nd	Democratic	1959	1982*	1966; 1973	1967; 1974
Edward P. Hill	7th	Democratic	1965	1973	1969	1971
Samuel Steinfeld	4th	Republican	1967	1975	1972	1973
Earl T. Osborne	1st	Democratic	1967	1975	1974	1975
C. Homer Neikirk	3rd	Republican	1969	1973		
Scott Elgin Reed	5th	Democratic	1969	1977*	1975	1977*
James B. Stephenson	7th	Democratic	1973	1988*		
Pleas Jones	3rd	Republican	1973	1979*		
Boyce G. Clayton	1st	Democratic	1975	1983*		
Marvin J. Sternberg	4th	Republican	1975	1982*		
Robert O. Lukowsky	6th	Democratic	1975	1981*		

- *Continued as Justice of the Supreme Court.

== 1975 reorganization ==
Justice	District	Began active service	End of active service	Chief Justice start	Chief Justice end
Boyce G. Clayton	1st	1976	1983		
John S. Palmore	2nd	1976	1983	1977	1982
Pleas Jones	3rd	1976	1979		
Marvin J. Sternberg	4th	1976	1983		
Scott Elgin Reed	5th	1976	1979	1976	1977
Robert O. Lukowsky	6th	1976	1981		
James B. Stephenson	7th	1976	1989		
John Calvin Aker	3rd	1979	1986		
Robert F. Stephens	5th	1979	1999	1982	1998
John J. O'Hara	6th	1982	1983		
Roy N. Vance	1st	1983	1991		
William Gant	2nd	1983	1991		
Charles M. Leibson	4th	1983	1995		
Donald C. Wintersheimer	6th	1983	2007		
John D. White	3rd	1986	1986		
Joseph Lambert	3rd	1987	2008	1998	2008
Dan Jack Combs	7th	1989	1993		
Thomas B. Spain	1st	1991	1995		
Charles H. Reynolds	2nd	1991	1996		
Sara Walter Combs	7th	1993	1993		
Janet Stumbo	7th	1993	2005		
William Fuqua	1st	1995	1995		
William Graves	1st	1995	2006		
Nicholas King	4th	1995	1996		
Walter Arnold Baker	2nd	1996	1996		
William S. Cooper	2nd	1996	2006		
Martin E. Johnstone	4th	1996	2006		
James E. Keller	5th	1999	2005		
John C. Roach	5th	2005	2006		
Will T. Scott	7th	2005	2015		
John D. Minton Jr.	2nd	2006	2023	2008	2023
William E. McAnulty Jr.	4th	2006	2007		
Bill Cunningham	1st	2007	2019		
Lisabeth Tabor Hughes	4th	2007	2023		
Mary C. Noble	5th	2006	2017		
Wilfrid Schroder	6th	2007	2013		
Daniel J. Venters	3rd	2008	2019		
Michelle M. Keller	6th	2013	Incumbent		
David Allen Barber	7th	2015	2015		
Samuel T. Wright III	7th	2015	2021		
Laurance B. VanMeter	5th	2017	2025	2023	2025
David Buckingham	1st	2019	2019		
Christopher Shea Nickell	1st	2019	Incumbent		
Debra H. Lambert	3rd	2019	Incumbent	2025	present
Robert B. Conley	7th	2021	Incumbent		
Angela McCormick Bisig	4th	2023	Incumbent		
Kelly Thompson	2nd	2023	Incumbent		
Pamela R. Goodwine	5th	2025	Incumbent		
