= 1990 Kentucky elections =

A general election was held in the U.S. state of Kentucky on November 6, 1990. The primary election for all offices was held on May 29, 1990. As of 2026, this is the most recent election in which there were four ballot measures.

== Federal offices ==
=== United States Senate ===
Incumbent senator Mitch McConnell won reelection, defeating Democratic challenger Harvey I. Sloane.

=== United States House of Representatives ===
In 1990, Kentucky had seven congressional districts, electing four Democrats and three Republicans.

== State offices ==
=== Kentucky Senate ===
The Kentucky Senate consists of 38 members. In 1990, half of the chamber (all even-numbered districts) was up for election. Democrats maintained their majority, losing three seats.

=== Kentucky House of Representatives ===
Results by district

All 100 seats in the Kentucky House of Representatives were up for election in 1990. Democrats maintained their majority, losing three seats.

=== Kentucky Supreme Court ===
1990 Kentucky Supreme Court elections
- November 6, 1990

4 of the 7 districts of the Kentucky Supreme Court

The Kentucky Supreme Court consists of seven justices elected in non-partisan elections to staggered eight-year terms. Districts 1, 2, 4, and 6 were up for election in 1990.

==== District 1 ====
1990 Kentucky Supreme Court 1st district election
- District 1
Candidate	Thomas B. Spain	J. William Howerton
Popular vote	41,798	39,490
Percentage	51.42%	48.58%
- County results Spain: 50–60% 60–70% 70–80% 80–90% Howerton: 50–60% 60–70% 80–90% Tie: 50%
Justice before election
Roy N. Vance
Elected Justice
Thomas B. Spain

1990 Kentucky Supreme Court 1st district election
Candidate	Votes	%
Thomas B. Spain	41,798	51.42
J. William Howerton	39,490	48.58
Total votes	81,288	100.0

==== District 2 ====
1990 Kentucky Supreme Court 2nd district election
- District 2
Candidate	Charles H. Reynolds	William S. Cooper
Popular vote	44,982	41,140
Percentage	52.23%	47.77%
- County results Reynolds: 50–60% 70–80% Cooper: 50–60% 80–90%
Justice before election
William Gant
Elected Justice
Charles H. Reynolds

1990 Kentucky Supreme Court 2nd district election
Candidate	Votes	%
Charles H. Reynolds	44,982	52.23
William S. Cooper	41,140	47.77
Total votes	86,122	100.0

==== District 4 ====
1990 Kentucky Supreme Court 4th district election
- District 4
Candidate	Charles M. Leibson	Henry Armstrong Triplett
Popular vote	119,215	45,615
Percentage	72.33%	27.67%
Justice before election
Charles M. Leibson
Elected Justice
Charles M. Leibson

1990 Kentucky Supreme Court 4th district election
Candidate	Votes	%
Charles M. Leibson (incumbent)	119,215	72.33
Henry Armstrong Triplett	45,615	27.67
Total votes	164,830	100.0

==== District 6 ====
1990 Kentucky Supreme Court 6th district election
- District 6
Candidate	Donald C. Wintersheimer
Popular vote	—
Percentage	100.0%
Justice before election
Donald C. Wintersheimer
Elected Justice
Donald C. Wintersheimer

1990 Kentucky Supreme Court 6th district election
Candidate	Votes	%
Donald C. Wintersheimer (incumbent)	Unopposed	

== Local offices ==
=== School boards ===
Local school board members are elected to staggered four-year terms, with half up for election in 1990.

== Ballot measures ==
=== Amendment 1 ===
==== Text ====
Do you favor allowing the General Assembly to call itself into special legislative session upon petition by two-thirds of the membership of the General Assembly?

==== Results ====
Results by county: No: 50–60%; 60–70%; 70–80%; 80–90%; Yes: 50–60%; 60–70%

Amendment 1
Choice	Votes	%
For	296,060	41.59
Against	415,721	58.41
Total	711,781	100.00

=== Amendment 2 ===
==== Text ====
Do you favor the General Assembly having the authority to establish a process which allows it, or an agency or a committee it designates, to review, approve, or reject any administrative regulation of an officer or agency of the executive department during or between regular sessions of the General Assembly?

==== Results ====
Results by county: No: 50–60%; 60–70%; 70–80%; 80–90%; Yes: 50–60%

Amendment 2
Choice	Votes	%
For	213,821	31.14
Against	472,725	68.86
Total	686,546	100.00

=== Amendment 3 ===
==== Text ====
Do you favor removing from the Kentucky Constitution various detailed limitations related to the organization, financing and operation of local governments and giving the General Assembly more authority to: classify and regulate cities; grant cities "home rule" powers; set limits on local government tax rates and debt capacity; regulate city elections and the terms in office of city council and commission members; and regulate local government taxing powers; including the power to grant limited tax exemptions to businesses and industries?

==== Results ====
Results by county: No: 50–60%; 60–70%; 70–80%; 80–90%

Amendment 3
Choice	Votes	%
For	230,723	34.10
Against	445,853	65.90
Total	676,576	100.00

=== Amendment 4 ===
==== Text ====
Are you in favor of providing a tax exemption for the real property owned and occupied by, and personal property, both tangible and intangible, owned by, institutions of religion?

==== Results ====
Results by county: Yes: 50–60%; 60–70%; 70–80%; 80–90%; No: 70–80%

Amendment 4
Choice	Votes	%
For	584,522	71.25
Against	235,806	28.75
Total	820,328	100.00

== See also ==
- Elections in Kentucky
- Politics of Kentucky
- Political party strength in Kentucky
