= 1998 Kentucky elections =

A general election was held in the U.S. state of Kentucky on November 3, 1998. The primary election for all offices was held on May 26, 1998.

== Federal offices ==
=== United States Senate ===
Republican candidate Jim Bunning defeated fellow congressman Scotty Baesler following the retirement of incumbent senator Wendell Ford.

=== United States House of Representatives ===
Kentucky has six congressional districts, electing five Republicans and one Democrat.

== State offices ==
=== Kentucky Senate ===
Results by district

The Kentucky Senate consists of 38 members. In 1998, half of the chamber (all even-numbered districts) was up for election. The bipartisan coalition led by Larry Saunders maintained its majority, without gaining or losing any seats.

=== Kentucky House of Representatives ===
Results by district

All 100 seats in the Kentucky House of Representatives were up for election in 1998. Democrats maintained their majority, gaining one seat.

=== Kentucky Supreme Court ===
1998 Kentucky Supreme Court elections
- November 3, 1998

4 of the 7 districts of the Kentucky Supreme Court

The Kentucky Supreme Court consists of seven justices elected in non-partisan elections to staggered eight-year terms. Districts 1, 2, 4, and 6 were up for election in 1998.

==== District 1 ====
1998 Kentucky Supreme Court 1st district election
- District 1
Candidate	William Graves	Rick Johnson
Popular vote	50,048	47,587
Percentage	51.26%	48.74%
- County results Graves: 50–60% 60–70% Johnson: 50–60% 60–70% 70–80%
Justice before election
William Graves
Elected Justice
William Graves

1998 Kentucky Supreme Court 1st district election
Candidate	Votes	%
William Graves (incumbent)	50,048	51.26
Rick Johnson	47,587	48.74
Total votes	97,635	100.0

==== District 2 ====
1998 Kentucky Supreme Court 2nd district election
- District 2
Candidate	William S. Cooper	Walter Arnold Baker
Popular vote	61,998	41,191
Percentage	60.08%	39.92%
- County results Cooper: 50–60% 60–70% 70–80% 80–90% Baker: 50–60% 60–70% 80–90%
Justice before election
William S. Cooper
Elected Justice
William S. Cooper

1998 Kentucky Supreme Court 2nd district election
Candidate	Votes	%
William S. Cooper (incumbent)	61,998	60.08
Walter Arnold Baker	41,191	39.92
Total votes	103,189	100.0

==== District 4 ====
1998 Kentucky Supreme Court 4th district election
- District 4
Candidate	Martin E. Johnstone
Popular vote	133,193
Percentage	100.0%
Justice before election
Martin E. Johnstone
Elected Justice
Martin E. Johnstone

1998 Kentucky Supreme Court 4th district election
Candidate	Votes	%
Martin E. Johnstone (incumbent)	Unopposed	
Total votes	133,193	100.0

==== District 6 ====
1998 Kentucky Supreme Court 6th district election
- District 6
Candidate	Donald C. Wintersheimer	Edwin F. Kagin
Popular vote	62,336	38,538
Percentage	61.80%	38.20%
- County results Wintersheimer: 50–60% 60–70% 70–80% Kagin: 50–60% 60–70%
Justice before election
Donald C. Wintersheimer
Elected Justice
Donald C. Wintersheimer

1998 Kentucky Supreme Court 6th district election
Candidate	Votes	%
Donald C. Wintersheimer (incumbent)	62,336	61.80
Edwin F. Kagin	38,538	38.20
Total votes	100,874	100.0

=== Other judicial elections ===
All judges of the Kentucky District Courts were elected in non-partisan elections to four-year terms.

== Local offices ==
=== County officers ===
All county officials were elected in partisan elections to four-year terms. The offices include the County Judge/Executive, the Fiscal Court (Magistrates and/or Commissioners), County Clerk, County Attorney, Jailer, Coroner, Surveyor, Property Value Administrator, Constables, and Sheriff.

=== Mayors ===
Mayors in Kentucky are elected to four-year terms, with cities holding their elections in either presidential or midterm years. Cities with elections in 1998 included those in Louisville and in Lexington.

=== City councils ===
Each incorporated city elected its council members to a two-year term.

=== School boards ===
Local school board members are elected to staggered four-year terms, with half up for election in 1998.

== Ballot measures ==
=== Amendment 1 ===
==== Text ====
Are you in favor of amending the Kentucky Constitution to reduce the General Assembly's organizational session by five days and to allow the General Assembly to meet in interim session in odd-numbered years for twenty five days?

==== Results ====
Results by county: No: 50–60%; 60–70%; Yes: 50–60%; 60–70%; Tie: 50%

Amendment 1
Choice	Votes	%
For	413,143	48.92
Against	431,304	51.08
Total	844,447	100.00

=== Amendment 2 ===
==== Text ====
Are you in favor of amending Section 170 of the Constitution of Kentucky to permit the General Assembly to exempt motor vehicles and other class of personal property from the levy of all or any portion of the property tax and to extend the homestead property tax exemption to persons who are classified as totally disabled by any public or private retirement system?

==== Results ====
Results by county: Yes: 50–60%; 60–70%; 70–80%; 80–90%; 90–100%

Amendment 2
Choice	Votes	%
For	678,141	78.68
Against	183,806	21.32
Total	861,947	100.00

== See also ==
- Elections in Kentucky
- Politics of Kentucky
- Political party strength in Kentucky
