= Sweet Evening Breeze =

American drag queen (1892–1983)

- Born: James R. Herndon; July 2, 1892; Scott County, Kentucky, US
- Died: December 16, 1983 (aged 91); Fayette County, Kentucky, US
- Burial place: Lexington Cemetery, Lexington, Kentucky, US
- Other names: Miss Sweets; Sweets
- Occupation: drag queen, orderly, activist

Sweet Evening Breeze (born James R. Herndon; July 2, 1892 – December 16, 1983), also known as Miss Sweets or Sweets, was an African American drag queen, activist, healthcare worker, and socialite. They were one of Lexington, Kentucky's first notable drag queens and are credited with promoting the city's early drag scene and culture. Among sources, Sweet Evening Breeze is referred to by various pronouns and expressions.

== Early life ==
Born in Scott County, Kentucky on July 2, 1892, Herndon moved to Lexington as a child. They were rumored to have been brought to the city's Good Samaritan Hospital for an eye injury and left there by their uncle. However, Sweets is recorded in the 1910 Georgetown census at age 16 as living with their parents. Sweets' age is inconsistent when listed on various censuses. Between 1910 and 1920, they moved to live with an uncle on Prall Street, before working at the city's Good Samaritan Hospital where Sweets dressed in masculine attire and eventually worked their way up to the position of head orderly at the hospital.

== Life ==
Jeffery Alan Jones, LGBTQ+ scholar, notes that "Sweets was visible within white [Lexingtonian] society in few ways that African Americans of the period could be." They were generally accepted and embraced by the Lexington community at a time when LGBTQ+ and African American people were often not tolerated. Sweets frequently hosted and entertained in her Prall Street home in Lexington, and made regular appearances, as a cheerleader in uniform, at University of Kentucky football games, as well as other events. In addition to cheerleading and participating in events at the racially segregated University of Kentucky, Sweets also had many sexual partnerships with athletes that attended the college. Sweets often participated in “womanless weddings”, a theatrical event where an all-male cast performs the roles of a traditional wedding party. In these “weddings,” Sweets would dress up in bridal wear, providing entertainment to her guests. She held these events during the 1930s in black churches located in Lexington and performed in at least three womanless weddings to University of Kentucky quarterbacks.

Sweet Evening Breeze's home became one of few safe meeting spaces for gay couples, Black drag shows, and gay social events. Sweets' home on Prall Street is part of a larger system of "queer geographies", established circuits of bars, homes, and hotels in Lexington where gay men held events and drag performances. Sweets' home is also part of an LGBTQ walking tour of downtown Lexington.

Sweets was also dedicated to and active at Pleasant Green Baptist Church, which is the oldest active African American congregation west of the Allegheny Mountains.

Sweets died at the age of 91 in 1983 at the Homestead Nursing Center, and is buried at the Lexington Cemetery.

== Arrest ==
In the 1960s, Sweets and a teenage aspiring drag artist were arrested in downtown Lexington under violation of the city's cross-dressing ordinance, which prohibited men from donning women's clothes and/or makeup. As upwards of two-thirds of sodomy and cross-dressing arrests in Kentucky were charged against Black people, this was not uncommon for a Black gender non-conforming individual. Sodomy Laws in Kentucky were deemed unconstitutional by the Kentucky Supreme Court in Kentucky v. Wasson (1992), and the introduction of the Fayette County-wide Fairness Ordinance (1999) signified changes toward ending other forms of LGBTQ+ discrimination.

== Activism ==
On the night of April 8, 1970, the Lexington Police arrested four queens, including one of Sweets' friends, 22-year old Leigh Angelique (Garland Hanley). After police raided what is now the Bar Complex on East Main Street in Lexington for them "wearing disguises", Leigh sought refuge at Sweets' home. Sweets was furious with the unfair treatment, and took it upon herself to call the judge who was assigned to sentence Leigh. The judge complied with dropping the charges after Sweets told him it was "in his best interests". After the event, it was the last time Lexington Police raided a gay bar under false pretenses. Leigh and Sweets celebrated the date as "Bastille Day" after dismantling wrongful enforcement.

== Legacy ==
Sweets' life and experiences are recorded and featured in a 2013 documentary film, Last Gospel of the Pagan Babies, a project of Media Working Group, with Jean Donohue as producer and director,[17] as most of their story has been told through oral histories.[18]

In 2017, local author, historian, and director of the Faulkner Morgan Archive Dr. Jonathon Coleman, spoke on the legacy of Sweets during a hosted event at the Lexington Public Library. The proceeds from the library event went toward funding the Moveable Feast organization in Lexington, KY, which prioritizes getting cooked meals to people living with HIV/AIDS among other illnesses and disabilities. Similarly, in Herndon's lifetime, she channeled extensive funds and resources from himself and events back into Lexington's black and LGBTQ+ communities. The Sweet Evening Breeze foundation, based in Louisville, Kentucky, also took inspiration from the legacy of Sweets. This foundation was established in 2018 and has since been dedicated to providing aid to young LGBTQ+ adults experiencing homelessness in the Louisville area. This aid includes providing shelter, food, support, and disease testing. The Sweet Evening Breeze website gives links to resources including affirming groups, homelessness services, health services, immigrant, asylee, refugee services, and educational resources.

In 2021, with funding from PRHBTN, street artist Gaia painted a mural of Sweets entitled Mother Of Us All at 161 North Limestone in Lexington. The mural is based on a photo of Sweets of the same name, taken in 1972 by John Denny Ashley, from the collection of the Faulkner Morgan Archive.

Kentucky winery Talon Winery created an award-winning wine named after Sweet Evening Breeze. It received notable awards, including: Silver, Commonwealth Commercial, 2024; Bronze, Commonwealth Commercial, 2023; Best White, Commissioner's Cup Winner, 2021; Double Gold, Commonwealth Commercial 2021; Silver, Finger Lakes International 2019; Gold, INDY International 2019.

Cormac McCarthy's novel Suttree features a character named Sweet Evening Breeze. This character is meant to be a reflection on the real struggles of Sweets' civil right activism but there is not a connection to their personal history. This character is simply inspired by Sweets.

The book on her life and legacy was first announced in 2022 by Kentucky author Maryjean Wall. The book, entitled "She's the Mother of Us All": Sweet Evening Breeze and the Queer Community of Lexington, Kentucky, has since been published.
