= 1996 Kentucky elections =

A general election was held in the U.S. state of Kentucky on November 5, 1996. The primary election for all offices was held on May 28, 1996.

== Federal offices ==
=== United States President ===
Kentucky had 8 electoral votes in the Electoral College. Democratic president Bill Clinton won with 46 percent of the vote.

=== United States Senate ===
Incumbent senator Mitch McConnell won reelection, defeating Democratic challenger Steve Beshear.

=== United States House of Representatives ===
Kentucky has six congressional districts, electing five Republicans and one Democrat.

== State offices ==
=== Kentucky Senate ===
The Kentucky Senate consists of 38 members. In 1996, half of the chamber (all odd-numbered districts) was up for election. Democrats maintained their majority, losing one seat; however, a coalition of 5 Democrats and 18 Republicans formed to control the chamber.

=== Kentucky House of Representatives ===
Results by district

All 100 seats in the Kentucky House of Representatives were up for election in 1996. Democrats maintained their majority, gaining one seat.

=== Kentucky Supreme Court ===
1996 Kentucky Supreme Court elections
- November 5, 1996

3 of the 7 districts of the Kentucky Supreme Court

The Kentucky Supreme Court consists of seven justices elected in non-partisan elections to staggered eight-year terms. District 7 was up for election in 1996. Special elections were held in districts 2 and 4.

==== District 2 ====
1996 Kentucky Supreme Court 2nd district special election
- District 2
Candidate	William S. Cooper	Joseph R. Huddleston
Popular vote	33,672	32,140
Percentage	27.45%	26.20%
Candidate	Walter Arnold Baker	John D. Miller
Popular vote	30,279	26,593
Percentage	24.68%	21.68%
- County results Cooper: 20–30% 40–50% 60–70% Huddleston: 20–30% 50–60% Baker: 30–40% 50–60% 80–90% Miller: 20–30% 30–40% 60–70%
Justice before election
Walter Arnold Baker
Elected Justice
William S. Cooper

1996 Kentucky Supreme Court 2nd district special election
Candidate	Votes	%
William S. Cooper	33,672	27.45
Joseph R. Huddleston	32,140	26.20
Walter Arnold Baker (incumbent)	30,279	24.68
John D. Miller	26,593	21.68
Total votes	122,684	100.0

==== District 4 ====
1996 Kentucky Supreme Court 4th district special election
- District 4
Candidate	Martin E. Johnstone	Nicholas King
Popular vote	157,580	77,192
Percentage	67.12%	32.88%
Justice before election
Nicholas King
Elected Justice
Martin E. Johnstone

1996 Kentucky Supreme Court 4th district special election
Candidate	Votes	%
Martin E. Johnstone	157,580	67.12
Nicholas King (incumbent)	77,192	32.88
Total votes	234,772	100.0

==== District 7 ====
1996 Kentucky Supreme Court 7th district election
- District 7
Candidate	Janet L. Stumbo
Popular vote	73,736
Percentage	100.0%
Justice before election
Janet L. Stumbo
Elected Justice
Janet L. Stumbo

1996 Kentucky Supreme Court 7th district election
Candidate	Votes	%
Janet L. Stumbo (incumbent)	Unopposed	
Total votes	73,736	100.0

== Local offices ==
=== City councils ===
Each incorporated city elected its council members to a two-year term.

=== School boards ===
Local school board members are elected to staggered four-year terms, with half up for election in 1996.

== Ballot measures ==
=== Amendment 1 ===
==== Text ====
Are you in favor of amending Sections 180 and 187 of the Constitution of Kentucky to remove language permitting a local government to levy a poll tax on each person residing within the county or city, and to remove language requiring the separate schools for "white" and "colored" children be maintained?

==== Results ====
Results by county: Yes: 50–60%; 60–70%; 70–80%; No: 50–60%

Amendment 1
Choice	Votes	%
For	567,790	67.29
Against	276,018	32.71
Total	843,808	100.00

== See also ==
- Elections in Kentucky
- Politics of Kentucky
- Political party strength in Kentucky
