= Commonwealth v. Wasson =

1992 Kentucky Supreme Court Case Overturning State Sodomy Law

- Court: Kentucky Supreme Court
- Full case name: Commonwealth of Kentucky v. Jeffrey Wasson
- Decided: September 24, 1992
- Citation: 842 S.W.2d 487

Court membership
- Judges sitting: Robert F. Stephens, Dan Jack Combs, Charles M. Leibson, Thomas B. Spain, Joseph Lambert, Charles H. Reynolds, Donald C. Wintersheimer

Case opinions
- Majority: Leibson, joined by Combs, Stephens, Spain
- Concurrence: Combs, joined by Stephens
- Dissent: Lambert, joined by Reynolds
- Dissent: Wintersheimer, joined by Reynolds

Kentucky v. Wasson, 842 S.W.2d 487 (Ky. 1992), was a 1992 Kentucky Supreme Court decision striking down the state's anti-sodomy laws that criminalized sexual activity between two people of the same legal sex, holding that this was a violation of both the equal protection of the laws and the right to privacy. The Kentucky case helped pave the way for many other states and eventually the United States Supreme Court to issue similar rulings.

== The law at issue ==
At that time, Kentucky law criminalized consensual sexual relations between people of the same sex, even if conducted in private. Specifically, the law criminalized genital-oral (oral sex), genital-anal (anal sex), and anal-oral (anilingus) sex -but only between partners of the same sex. Such sexual activities between mixed-sex (male-female) couples were legal. Such conduct was a misdemeanor punishable by up to 12 months in jail and a fine of up to $500. Solicitation of same was also a misdemeanor, punishable by up to 90 days in jail and a fine of up to $250.

Historically, Kentucky's sodomy statutes had changed over time. The 1860 sodomy statute criminalized anal penetration by a penis and applied to both male-female couples and male-male couples. Because the law focused exclusively on penile-anal penetration, consensual sex between women was technically legal in Kentucky until 1974. In fact, in 1909 the Kentucky Supreme Court issued a ruling in Commonwealth v. Poindexter involving two African-American men arrested for consensual oral sex. In this decision the court upheld that the then current sodomy law did not criminalize oral sex but only anal sex.

In 1974 Kentucky revised its statutes as part of a penal code reform advocated by the American Law Institute. While the American Law Institute urged states to decriminalize consensual sodomy and other victimless crimes, the Kentucky legislature chose to decriminalize anal sex involving male-female couples but to broaden the new statute to criminalize anal-genital, oral-genital, and oral-anal sexual contact involving same-sex couples (both male-male and female-female couples). Thus, the 1974 revised statute decriminalized consensual anal sex for mixed-sex couples but expanded criminalization of sexual acts to include both male and female same-sex couples.

== Factual background ==
Jeffrey Wasson, a 23-year-old nursing student, was arrested in 1986 and charged with solicitation of same-sex sodomy as the result of an undercover sting operation conducted by the Lexington police. The police selected an area and conversed with men to see if they would be solicited for sex under the 1974 statute defining fourth degree sodomy as actual or solicitation of consensual sodomy. As Wasson left The Bar Complex, a Lexington gay bar, to walk to his car, an undercover officer engaged Wasson in the parking lot and taped approximately 20 minutes of a conversation with Wasson. Near the end of the conversation Wasson invited the officer to come home with him. When prodded for details, Wasson suggested sexual activities that violated the Kentucky statute prohibiting homosexual activity. Wasson was one of 29 men arrested during this police sting, along with notable later gay rights activists like Brandon DeSiata. Rather than paying the fine, he sought legal representation to contest the law. In its recitation of the facts, the Kentucky Supreme Court noted that there "was no suggestion that sexual activity would occur anyplace other than in the privacy of Wasson's home. The sexual activity was intended to have been between consenting adults. No money was offered or solicited."

Judge Lewis Paisley in the initial trial court, Fayette District Court, dismissed the charges holding that the law was unconstitutional. Upon appeal, the Fayette Circuit Court reached the same conclusion. The Commonwealth appealed that decision. The Kentucky Supreme Court granted a transfer, bypassing the Kentucky Court of Appeals.

== Kentucky Supreme Court decision ==
On September 24, 1992, in a 4–3 ruling, the Court struck down anti-sodomy laws in effect since 1860, declaring them unconstitutional under Kentucky law with the declaration that it violated both the right to privacy and the right to equal protection under the law found in the Kentucky Constitution. Justice Charles M. Leibson authored the majority opinion, which noted:

More significantly, Kentucky has a rich and compelling tradition of recognizing and protecting individual rights from state intrusion in cases similar in nature, found in the Debates of the Kentucky Constitutional Convention of 1890 and cases from the same era when that Constitution was adopted... Kentucky cases recognized a legally protected right of privacy based on our own constitution and common law tradition long before the United States Supreme Court first took notice of whether there were any rights of privacy inherent in the Federal Bill of Rights.

Asserting that "state constitutional jurisprudence in this area is not limited by the constraints inherent in federal due process analysis", the majority opinion held that the law as written and enforced "infringed upon the equal protection guarantees found in the Kentucky Constitution."

The case was styled Commonwealth of Kentucky v. Jeffery Wasson, 842 S.W.2d 487. The decision was handed down on September 24, 1992.

The case was among the early ones to strike down same-sex sodomy laws on the grounds that such laws violated the Equal Protection doctrine. Four other states preceded Kentucky in striking down same-sex sodomy laws. New York in New York v. Onofre and Pennsylvania in Commonwealth v. Bonadio did so on grounds similar to those cited by the Kentucky Supreme Court. A lower appellate court in Texas and the Wayne County Circuit Court in Michigan had also struck down same-sex sodomy laws by that time, though neither state's highest court had yet issued such a holding. Those cases were State v. Morales and Michigan Organization for Human Rights v. Kelley. Citing these cases, the Kentucky court wrote: "Thus our decision, rather than being the leading edge of change, is but a part of the moving stream." In time this statement was proven correct, as other states and eventually the United States Supreme Court reached the same conclusion as Kentucky had in Wasson.

At the time, the decision–which was based solely on interpretation of the Kentucky Constitution–was at odds with federal case law on the same subject. The United States Supreme Court had previously held in Bowers v. Hardwick that federal constitutional protection of the right of privacy was not implicated in laws penalizing homosexual sodomy. It was not until years after the Wasson case that the United States Supreme Court revisited the issue and reversed its holding in Lawrence v. Texas.

== See also ==
- LGBT rights in Kentucky
