= Electoral history of Hal Rogers =

American political record

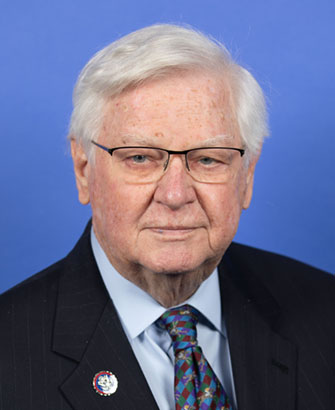
Official portrait, 2022.

Hal Rogers is an American politician from Kentucky who is currently serving in the U.S. House of Representatives since 1981. Rogers has served Kentucky's 5th congressional district for his entire term in Congress. Prior to his stint in Congress, Rogers served as the Commonwealth's Attorney of the 28th Kentucky Circuit Court from 1969 to 1981. He is currently the dean of the U.S. House of Representatives, and is one of the longest serving members of the House.

== U.S. House of Representatives ==
=== 1980s ===
1980 Kentucky's 5th congressional district election
Primary election
Party	Candidate	Votes	%
Republican	Hal Rogers	13,266	23.4
Republican	Tom Emberton	10,576	18.6
Republican	Gene Huff	9,595	16.9
Republican	John D. Rogers	7,439	13.1
Republican	Raymond Overstreet	5,171	9.1
Republican	Eddie C. Lovelace	3,703	6.5
Republican	Elmer Patrick	3,681	6.5
Republican	Henry Skyler Garrison	2,246	4.0
Republican	Philip Connley	753	1.3
Republican	Elmer Begley, Jr.	192	0.3
Republican	Thurman J. Hamlin	131	0.2
Total votes		56,756	100.0
General election
Republican	Hal Rogers	112,093	67.5
Democratic	Ted R. Marcum	54,027	32.5
Total votes		166,120	100.0
Republican hold			

1982 Kentucky's 5th congressional district election
Primary election
Party	Candidate	Votes	%
Republican	Hal Rogers (incumbent)	10,239	93.8
Republican	Thurman Jerome Hamlin	671	6.2
Total votes		10,910	100.0
General election
Republican	Hal Rogers (incumbent)	52,928	85.2
Democratic	Doye Davenport	28,285	34.8
Write-in		4	0.0
Total votes		81,217	100.0
Republican hold			

1984 Kentucky's 5th congressional district election
Party	Candidate	Votes	%
Republican	Hal Rogers (incumbent)	125,164	75.9
Democratic	Sherman Wilson McIntosh	39,783	24.1
Total votes		164,947	100.0
Republican hold			

1986 Kentucky's 5th congressional district election
Party	Candidate	Votes	%
Republican	Hal Rogers (incumbent)	56,760	100.0
Write-in		4	0.0
Total votes		56,764	100.0
Republican hold			

1988 Kentucky's 5th congressional district election
Party	Candidate	Votes	%
Republican	Hal Rogers (incumbent)	104,467	100.0
Write-in		34	0.0
Total votes		104,501	100.0
Republican hold			

=== 1990s ===
1990 Kentucky's 5th congressional district election
Party	Candidate	Votes	%
Republican	Hal Rogers (incumbent)	64,660	100.0
Total votes		64,660	100.0
Republican hold			

1992 Kentucky's 5th congressional district election
Party	Candidate	Votes	%
Republican	Hal Rogers (incumbent)	115,255	54.6
Democratic	John Doug Hays	95,760	45.4
Total votes		211,015	100.0
Republican hold			

1994 Kentucky's 5th congressional district election
Party	Candidate	Votes	%
Republican	Hal Rogers (incumbent)	82,291	79.4
Democratic	Walter Blevins	21,318	20.6
Total votes		103,609	100.0
Republican hold			

1996 Kentucky's 5th congressional district election
Party	Candidate	Votes	%
Republican	Hal Rogers (incumbent)	117,842	100.0
Write-in		11	0.0
Total votes		117,853	100.0
Republican hold			

1998 Kentucky's 5th congressional district election
Party	Candidate	Votes	%
Republican	Hal Rogers (incumbent)	142,215	78.2
Democratic	Sidney Jane Bailey-Bamer	39,585	21.8
Total votes		181,800	100.0
Republican hold			

=== 2000s ===
2000 Kentucky's 5th congressional district election
Party	Candidate	Votes	%
Republican	Hal Rogers (incumbent)	145,980	73.6
Democratic	Sidney Jane Bailey	52,495	26.4
Total votes		198,475	100.0
Republican hold			

2002 Kentucky's 5th congressional district election
Primary election
Party	Candidate	Votes	%
Republican	Hal Rogers (incumbent)	77,615	91.8
Republican	Billy Ray Wilson	6,948	8.2
Total votes		84,563	100.0
General election
Republican	Hal Rogers (incumbent)	137,986	78.3
Democratic	Sidney Jane Bailey	38,254	21.7
Total votes		176,240	100.0
Republican hold			

2004 Kentucky's 5th congressional district election
Primary election
Party	Candidate	Votes	%
Republican	Hal Rogers (incumbent)	26,909	91.3
Republican	Billy Ray Wilson	2,566	8.7
Total votes		29,475	100.0
General election
Republican	Hal Rogers (incumbent)	177,579	100.0
Total votes		177,579	100.0
Republican hold			

2006 Kentucky's 5th congressional district election
Party	Candidate	Votes	%
Republican	Hal Rogers (incumbent)	147,201	73.8
Democratic	Kenneth Stepp	52,367	26.2
Total votes		199,568	100.0
Republican hold			

2008 Kentucky's 5th congressional district election
Party	Candidate	Votes	%
Republican	Hal Rogers (incumbent)	177,024	84.1
Independent	Jim Holbert	33,444	15.9
Total votes		210,468	100.0
Republican hold			

=== 2010s ===
2010 Kentucky's 5th congressional district election
Party	Candidate	Votes	%
Republican	Hal Rogers (incumbent)	151,019	77.4
Democratic	James E. "Jim" Holbert	44,034	22.6
Total votes		195,053	100.0
Republican hold			

2012 Kentucky's 5th congressional district election
Party	Candidate	Votes	%
Republican	Hal Rogers (incumbent)	195,408	77.9
Democratic	Kenneth S. Stepp	55,447	22.1
Total votes		250,855	100.0
Republican hold			

2014 Kentucky's 5th congressional district election
Party	Candidate	Votes	%
Republican	Hal Rogers (incumbent)	171,350	78.3
Democratic	Kenneth S. Stepp	47,617	21.7
Total votes		218,967	100.0
Republican hold			

2016 Kentucky's 5th congressional district election
Primary election
Party	Candidate	Votes	%
Republican	Hal Rogers (incumbent)	35,984	82.4
Republican	John Burke Jr.	7,669	17.6
Total votes		43,653	100.0
General election
Republican	Hal Rogers (incumbent)	221,242	100.0
Total votes		221,242	100.0
Republican hold			

2018 Kentucky's 5th congressional district election
Primary election
Party	Candidate	Votes	%
Republican	Hal Rogers (incumbent)	75,601	84.2
Republican	Gerardo Serrano	14,216	15.8
Total votes		89,817	100.0
General election
Republican	Hal Rogers (incumbent)	172,093	78.9
Democratic	Kenneth S. Stepp	45,890	21.1
Write-in		34	0.0
Total votes		218,017	100.0
Republican hold			

=== 2020s ===
2020 Kentucky's 5th congressional district election
Primary election
Party	Candidate	Votes	%
Republican	Hal Rogers (incumbent)	76,575	91.1
Republican	Gerardo Serrano	7,436	8.9
Total votes		84,011	100.0
General election
Republican	Hal Rogers (incumbent)	250,914	84.2
Democratic	Matthew Ryan Best	47,056	15.8
Total votes		297,970	100.0
Republican hold			

2022 Kentucky's 5th congressional district election
Primary election
Party	Candidate	Votes	%
Republican	Hal Rogers (incumbent)	77,050	82.6
Republican	Gerardo Serrano	5,460	5.9
Republican	Jeanette Andrews	4,160	4.5
Republican	Brandon Russell Monhollen	3,831	4.1
Republican	Rich Van Dam	2,784	3.0
Total votes		93,285	100.0
General election
Republican	Hal Rogers (incumbent)	177,712	82.2
Democratic	Conor Halbleib	38,549	17.8
Write-in		9	0.0
Total votes		216,270	100.0
Republican hold			

2024 Kentucky's 5th congressional district election
Primary election
Party	Candidate	Votes	%
Republican	Hal Rogers (incumbent)	39,423	81.8
Republican	Dana Edwards	5,112	10.6
Republican	Brandon Monhollen	2,673	5.5
Republican	David E. Kraftchak Jr.	997	2.1
Total votes		48,205	100.0
General election
Republican	Hal Rogers (incumbent)	261,407	100.0
Total votes		261,407	100.0
Republican hold			
