= Senator Travis =

Senator Travis may refer to:

- Eugene M. Travis (1863–1940), New York State Senate
- Joe Lane Travis (born 1931), Kentucky State Senate
- Robert S. Travis (1909–1980), Wisconsin State Senate
