= Jeffrey Wasson =

Jeffrey Allen Wasson
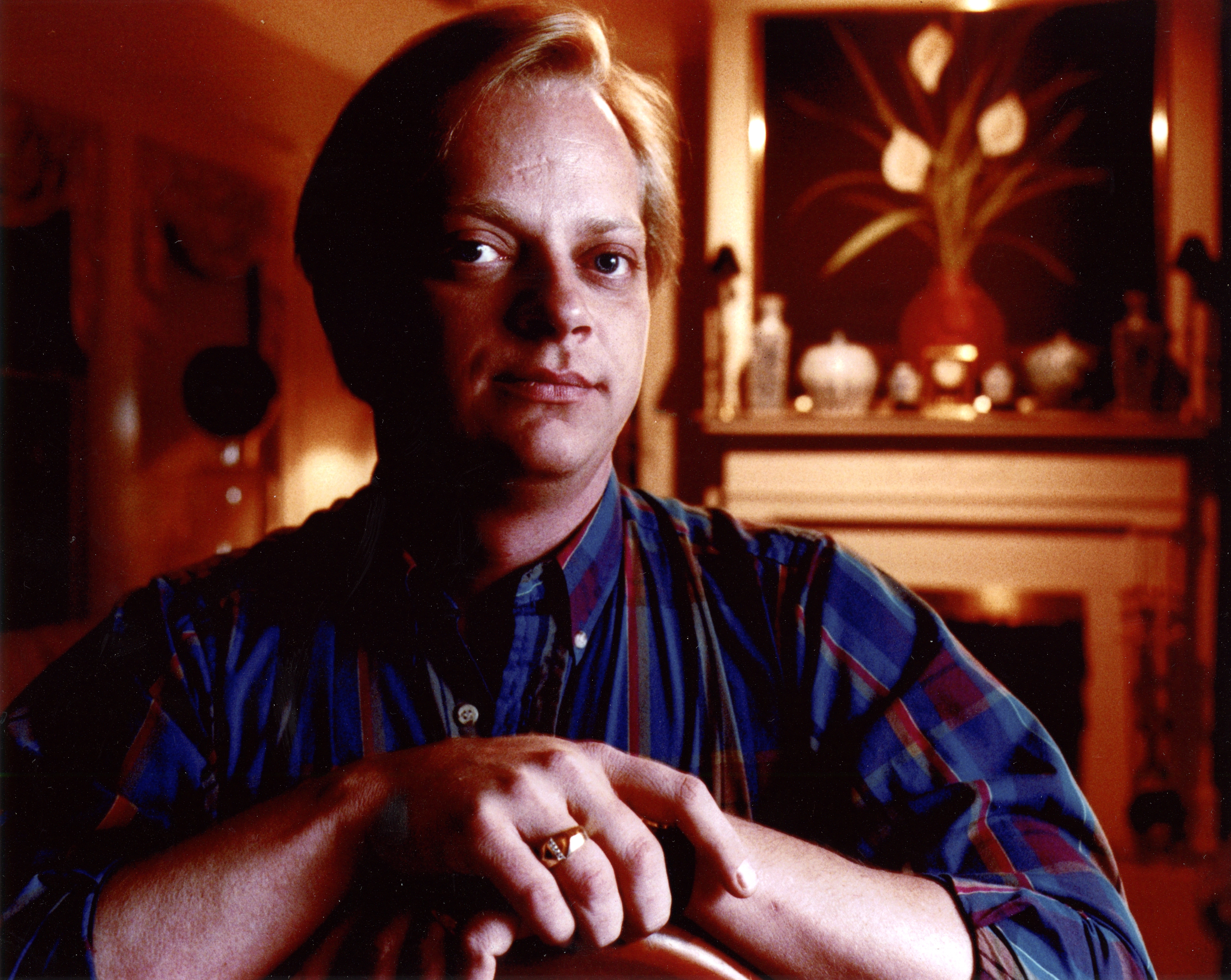
- Jeffrey Wasson in 1993
- Born: Jeffrey Allen Wasson; February 20, 1962; Powell County, Kentucky, US
- Died: September 27, 2016 (aged 54); Stanton, Powell County, Kentucky, US
- Occupations: Nurse, RN case manager
- Known for: Commonwealth of Kentucky vs. Jeffrey Wasson (842 S.W.2d 487) (September 24, 1992)
- Partner: Terry Rothgeb

Jeffrey Allen Wasson (February 20, 1962 – September 27, 2016) was a nurse from Stanton, Kentucky, whose participation in Commonwealth v. Wasson (842 S.W.2d 487) (1992) contributed to the striking down of Kentucky's sodomy law.

== Biography ==
Wasson was born to Shelby and Rosalee Wasson on February 20, 1962, in Powell County, Kentucky. He was the third of five children, having two brothers and two sisters, whom he was reportedly close to. Wasson realized his feelings for other boys when he was approximately 7 years old and was bullied frequently in school. In an interview, Wasson stated that he dealt with feelings of insecurity, saying "I always felt I had to make up for being an evil person...I tried to make people proud of me." He attended Powell County High School until his junior year, when he began having suicidal feelings and transferred to Clark County High School in Winchester, Kentucky. After graduation, Wasson attended the University of Tennessee in Knoxville, Tennessee, studying broadcasting and communication. After failing to find a job in broadcasting, Wasson began studying to be a licensed practical nurse.

=== Citation ===
In 1986, Wasson was issued a citation along with 28 other men near The Bar Complex, a gay bar in Lexington, Kentucky, for soliciting sexual activity deemed illegal under Kentucky's sodomy law (Kentucky Revised Statute 510.100). The law criminalized oral and anal intercourse only between partners of the same sex. The law did not apply to heterosexual couples and effectively criminalized consensual same-sex relationships, even those conducted in private. Those who either broke the law, either by participating in intercourse or soliciting it, would be punishable by either a fine or jail time.

In 1985 and 1986, the Lexington Police Department conducted an investigation in response to complaints over men soliciting sex, as well as reports of juvenile prostitution. Part of their investigation involved conducting sting operations, wherein a police officer would pose as a potential client and wait until the suspect expressed their intent to violate the sodomy law to either arrest them or issue a citation. In January 1986, Wasson was one of 29 men cited during one of these operations after inviting an undercover cop home for intercourse. The conversation between Wasson and the officer was recorded without the former's knowledge. Wasson refused to pay the fine and instead challenged the constitutionality of the law before the state court.

=== Later life and death ===
In an interview, Wasson stated that he struggled to stay employed between 1986 and 1993 due to the sensationalism of his case, explaining that "Every time it hit the paper or TV, I'd be out looking for a job." Lack of steady employment and the stress of the case worsened his mental health, eventually leading him to seek professional help.

After the court ruled in his favor, Wasson reported that his health improved considerably, moving in with a partner and starting a nursing supply store (Medical Professionals Unlimited). He lived privately for the rest of his life, eventually switching careers to become an RN case manager in Aventura, Florida.

Jeffrey Allen Wasson died at 53 years old on September 27, 2016, in Fort Lauderdale, Florida.

In 2018, the Kentucky Historical Society placed a marker of historical significance at the site of Wasson's arrest. The marker commemorates Wasson's contribution to the rights and protection of private same-sex relationships under Kentucky state law.

== Commonwealth vs. Wasson ==
In January 1986, Wasson was cited for the solicitation of sexual intercourse under Kentucky's sodomy law. He refused to pay the fine and instead took the issue to the Fayette District Court. In July 1986, Wasson and his attorney, Ernesto Scorsone, argued that the sodomy law was unconstitutional due to its violation of the equal protection clause of the 14th Amendment as well as the cruel and unusual punishment clause of the state and national constitutions. They stated that the exemption of heterosexual relationships under the law amounted to discrimination against homosexuals, and that any action taken against Wasson under the sodomy rule would be a violation of state and national law. The prosecution, led by attorney Jack Giles countered this by arguing that homosexuals' right to engage in intercourse was technically not protected under the Constitution.

On October 31, 1986, Fayette District Judge Lewis Paisley declared the law unconstitutional on the grounds that it violated the person's right to privacy. He did not address Scorsone's equal protection argument and instead ruled that, "because the law prohibited conduct between consenting adults, it violated a person's right to privacy as guaranteed under Section 1 of the Kentucky Constitution." Wasson reportedly "felt very vindicated by the ruling." On November 10, the prosecution filed a notice of appeal, challenging the ruling and attempting to bring it before the Fayette Circuit Court. The appeal was dismissed on October 13, 1987, by Judge Charles Tackett, who claimed that it had been filed incorrectly and could not be pursued. The case was brought back before the Circuit Court in 1990, and on June 8, Judge Tackett affirmed Judge Paisley's earlier ruling that the sodomy law was unconstitutional under the state constitution. Judge Tackett ruled that the law violated Sections 1, 2, and 3 of the Kentucky Constitution, which protect a person's right to privacy and equal protection under the law.

However, Judge Tackett and Judge Paisley did not have the power to enforce their rulings outside of their courts. This allowed the prosecution to take the ruling to the Kentucky Supreme Court for another chance at appeal. If the court sided with the prosecution, the law would be upheld; if the court sided with Wasson, the law would be deemed unconstitutional statewide and the charges against him would be dismissed.

On September 24, 1992, the Kentucky State Supreme Court ruled that the sodomy law was unconstitutional in a 4–3 decision. The Court, led by Justice Charles Leibson, agreed with Judge Lewis Paisley's original ruling that the law was unconstitutional due to its violation of a person's right to privacy under the Kentucky State Constitution. While Scorsone's assertion that the law violated the equal protection clause was not mentioned in the ruling, the majority did note that the law's exclusion of heterosexual relationships made it discriminatory. In his statement, Liebson wrote, "We need not sympathize, agree with, or even understand the sexual preference of homosexuals in order to recognize their right to equal treatment before the bar of criminal justice." In October 1992, the Attorney General attempted to ask the Court to reconsider their decision; this appeal was rejected and the ruling stood.

Commonwealth vs. Wasson was the first case in Kentucky to challenge the sodomy law on the grounds of unconstitutionality. The ruling made Kentucky the 25th state to strike down its sodomy law. Both Scorsone and Wasson praised the ruling for its representation of progress towards equal rights.
