= William Fuqua =

American judge (1930–2026)

Justice of the Kentucky Supreme Court
- In office July 27, 1995 – December 11, 1995
- Appointed by: Brereton C. Jones
- Preceded by: Thomas B. Spain
- Succeeded by: William Graves

Judge of the 7th Kentucky Circuit Court
- In office January 5, 1970 – June 30, 1995
- Preceded by: Thomas A. Noe Jr.
- Succeeded by: Tyler Gill

Personal details
- Born: November 4, 1930 Russellville, Kentucky, U.S.
- Died: July 30, 2026 (aged 95) Bowling Green, Kentucky, U.S.

William Gray Fuqua (November 4, 1930 – July 30, 2026) was an American judge who was a justice of the Kentucky Supreme Court from July to December 1995.

== Life and career ==
Born in Russellville, Kentucky on November 4, 1930, Fuqua's father served as mayor of the town. Fuqua served on the Circuit Court of Logan County, Kentucky, from 1970 until his retirement in June 1995. The following month, he was appointed by Governor Brereton C. Jones to serve for a brief period as a justice of the Kentucky Supreme Court, to a seat vacated by the retirement of Thomas B. Spain. Fuqua said he would not be a candidate in the special election to fill the remainder of the term.

Beginning in 1997, Fuqua became a frequent guest on the radio show Kentucky Living on WRUS-AM.

Fuqua died in Bowling Green, Kentucky on July 30, 2026, at the age of 95.

Political offices
Preceded by Thomas B. Spain	Justice of the Kentucky Supreme Court; 1995–1995	Succeeded by William Graves
