= Christopher Shea Nickell =

American judge (born 1958 or 1959)

Christopher Nickell

Justice of the Kentucky Supreme Court
- Incumbent
- Assumed office December 11, 2019
- Preceded by: David Buckingham

Judge of the Kentucky Court of Appeals
- In office January 1, 2007 – December 11, 2019
- Preceded by: Rick A. Johnson
- Succeeded by: Chris McNeill

Personal details
- Born: Christopher Shea Nickell; 1958 or 1959 (age 66–67) Paducah, Kentucky, U.S.
- Party: Republican
- Education: DePauw University (BA); University of Kentucky (JD)

Christopher Shea Nickell (born c. 1958 or 1959) is an American lawyer who has served a justice of the Kentucky Supreme Court.

== Education ==
Nickell, a native of Paducah, Kentucky, graduated from the city's Paducah Tilghman High School in 1977, followed by a Bachelor of Arts from DePauw University in 1981 and a Juris Doctor from the University of Kentucky College of Law in 1984.

== Career ==
Prior to being appointed as a judge, Nickell practiced law for 22 years. He served as an instructor at Murray State University teaching Insurance and Risk Management and he also taught at the University of North Carolina at Chapel Hill teaching jurisprudence.

=== State court service ===
In 2006, Nickell was elected to be a judge of the Kentucky Court of Appeals.

=== Kentucky Supreme Court service ===
On February 6, 2019, Nickell announced he was running for the seat on the Kentucky Supreme Court vacated by the retirement of Bill Cunningham. He was elected on November 5, 2019, defeating state senator Whitney Westerfield. He was sworn into office on December 11, 2019.

== Associations and memberships ==
Nickell has been a member of the Paducah Lions Club since 1989. He is also an Eagle Scout, he has been recognized as a Kentucky Colonel, Honorary Captain of the Belle of Louisville and a Sagamore of the Wabash. He is a Life Sponsor of Ducks Unlimited. He is also a 32 Degree Mason, a Silver Life Member of the National Association for the Advancement of Colored People, a Life Fellow of the Kentucky Bar Foundation, a Gideon, and a deacon at Paducah's Heartland Church.

== Personal life ==
Nickell and his wife, Carolyn S. Watson are both a Melvin Jones Fellow.

== Electoral history ==
JUSTICE OF THE SUPREME COURT, 1ST SUPREME COURT DISTRICT, UNEXPIRED TERM
Year	Non Partisan	Votes	Pct	Non Partisan	Votes	Pct
2019	Christopher Shea NICKELL	71,941	57.35%	Whitney H. WESTERFIELD	53,497	42.65%

Legal offices
Preceded by David Buckingham	Justice of the Kentucky Supreme Court; 2019–present	Incumbent
