= Marvin J. Sternberg =

American judge (1912–1994)

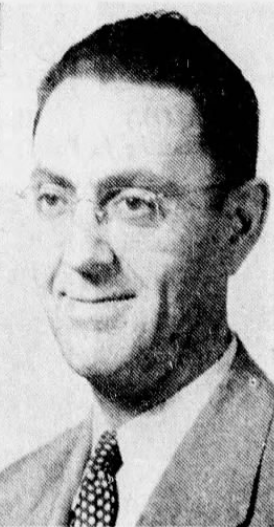
- Sternberg in 1953

Justice of the Kentucky Supreme Court
- In office January 1, 1976 – January 3, 1983
- Preceded by: Court established
- Succeeded by: Charles M. Leibson

Justice of the Kentucky Court of Appeals
- In office January 6, 1975 – December 31, 1975
- Preceded by: Samuel Steinfeld
- Succeeded by: Court became Supreme Court

Personal details
- Born: May 2, 1912
- Died: April 28, 1994 (aged 81)

Marvin John Sternberg (May 2, 1912 – April 28, 1994) was a justice of the Kentucky Supreme Court from 1975 to 1983.

== Biography ==
Sternberg was born 1912 and went to duPont Manual High School before going on to obtain a law degree in 1933 from the Jefferson School of Law. He started practicing law in Jamestown, Kentucky, then served as the Jamestown city attorney and worked in the legal section of the Office of Price Administration.

He married Miss Lillian Marie Rafferty in 1935 and together they had two children.

During World War II he volunteered to serve in all of the sections of the military but was not able to serve due to defective vision.

In 1943 he was appointed as assistant attorney general, a position he held for two years before returning to private practice in Louisville, Kentucky.

In 1953 he ran for the State Senate seat for the 36th district as a Republican but lost to Leon J. Shaikun a Democrat.

Sternberg was elected to the circuit court in 1963 on the Republican ticket and again for a second session in 1969 and served until 1974.

He was elected to the newly established supreme court in 1974 and he served from 1975 until January 1983.

Sternberg died April 28, 1994, in Jeffersontown, Kentucky aged 81 and was survived by his wife Lillian and two daughters.

He was a member of the First Lutheran Church, had been a master of the Free and Accepted Masons and a member of the Order of the Eastern Star.

Political offices
Preceded by Newly established court	Justice of the Kentucky Supreme Court; 1976–1983	Succeeded by Charles M. Leibson
