= George DuRelle =

American judge (1852–1926)

- DuRelle, c. 1912

2nd United States Attorney for the Western District of Kentucky
- In office 1906–1914
- Preceded by: Ruben D. Hill
- Succeeded by: Perry B. Miller

9th Justice of the Kentucky Court of Appeals's 4th District
- In office 1895–1903
- Preceded by: George B. Eastin
- Succeeded by: Henry Stites Barker

Assistant United States Attorney for the District Court for the District of Kentucky
- In office 1889–1891
- In office 1882–1886

Personal details
- Born: October 18, 1852 York, New York, United States
- Died: August 9, 1926 (aged 73) Louisville, Kentucky, United States
- Party: Republican
- Spouse: Louise Leib (m. 1886; died 1895)
- Children: 2
- Education: Hopkins Grammar School; Yale College; University of Louisville

George DuRelle (Note: Also spelt Durelle and Du Relle) (October 18, 1852 – August 9, 1926) was an American lawyer and judge who served as the United States Attorney for the United States District Court for the Western District of Kentucky and the ninth justice of the Kentucky Court of Appeals's 4th district.

Born in New York, he moved to Kentucky with his parents and was educated by his stepfather, who was a principal of various academic institutions when he was young. He graduated from Hopkins Grammar School and attended Yale College, but left the college at the end of his sophomore year. Returning to Louisville, he studied law and graduated from the University of Louisville and began practicing law within the city. He was soon assigned two non-consecutive roles as the Assistant United States Attorney for the District Court for the District of Kentucky. After a short term, he was reappointed for the judgeship of the Kentucky Court of Appeals, a position which he served for seven years. After that, he held the role of United States Attorney for the District Court for the Western District of Kentucky from 1906 to 1914. He was appointed by Judge Walter Evans to be the referee in bankruptcy, a position which he held until he died in 1926.

== Early life and education ==
DuRelle was born on October 18, 1852, in York, New York, to George O. J. DuRelle and Frances Mary Peirce. His paternal ancestors were probably French Huguenots and were among the earliest colonists of New England. His great-grandfather, Nicholas Du Relle, was one of the first selectmen appointed in the town of Lee, New Hampshire. His maternal ancestors were also New England people. His maternal ancestors include Connecticut Governors John Haynes and William Pitkin.

The older George DuRelle was a doctor who attended both Bowdoin and Dartmouth College, graduating in the latter with a Doctor of Medicine in 1838. He moved to York, where he worked and resided until he died in 1853. His mother, Frances, married Professor Samuel B. Barton of Centre College after the death of her first husband.

The younger George was an infant when the older one died, and her mother remarried to Barton. His parents moved to Louisville, Kentucky, in 1859, when he was seven years old. As his stepfather became the Principal of the Presbyterian Female School of that city, DuRelle received an early education and discipline under his stepfather. He later continued his studies under the preceptorship of Barton at Walnut Hill School, where his stepfather also became President.

DuRelle later attended the schools at Elizabeth, New Jersey, before graduating from Hopkins Grammar School in 1868. The same year, he was matriculated into Yale College as a member of the class of 1872, but returned to Louisville at end of his Sophomore year.

During his time teaching at Sixth Ward school, he attended the University of Louisville to study law in its School of Law, where he graduated in 1874 and was immediately admitted to the bar afterwards.

== Career ==
DuRelle was first employed to do some clerical duties and engaged teaching at Sixth Ward school. After graduating from the university, he began practicing law in the office of Robert W. Woolley. Later, he formed a partnership with H. C. Brannin and continued practicing law within Louisville. By 1882, he was appointed Assistant United States Attorney for the District Court for the District of Kentucky, in which he served until June 8, 1886, when he eventually resigned. He was reappointed in 1889 under President Benjamin Harrison's administration and served in that role until 1891, when he then again resigned to focus on his private practice.

DuRelle was frequently assigned as special master in the hearing of corporate litigation. During the November 1894 elections, with Sterling B. Toney as the Republican candidate and St. John Boyle as the Democratic candidate fighting for the judgeship of the Kentucky Court of Appeals, DuRelle served as leading counsel for Toney. When Toney won the election before the State Election Commission in 1895, he refused to hold the role, leaving a vacancy in the judgeship, which George B. Eastin temporarily filled by appointment of Governor John Y. Brown.

A general election was held in November 1895, with DuRelle as the Republican candidate and Eastin being the Democratic candidate, fighting over who would serve the rest of the eight-year term. DuRelle won the election and succeeded Eastin as a member of the Court of Appeals in December 1895, a position which he held until January 1903, a period of seven years.

After the end of his tenure as Justice of the Court of Appeals, DuRelle resumed practicing law. On June 22, 1906, he was appointed United States District Attorney, this time for the District Court for the Western District of Kentucky, serving until June 30, 1914. He was also appointed by Judge Walter Evans as a referee in bankruptcy in March 1915. He served that role under Judges Charles Harwood Moorman and Charles I. Dawson until his death.

== Personal life and death ==
DuRelle was politically a Republican and acted within the party since he was a voter and took an active role in politics. Ever since he was appointed to judicial office, he refrained from politics. He was also raised Presbyterian and frequently attended the Warren Memorial Presbyterian Church. He was also a member of the Masonic and Ancient Essenic Orders, The Filson Club, and the Sons of the American Revolution.

On June 3, 1886, DuRelle married Louise Leib, and they had two children together: Frederick L. and Louis Marie DuRelle. Leib died on November 23, 1895.

DuRelle died on August 9, 1926, in his home at Louisville, Kentucky, due to bronchial pneumonia.
