= John S. Palmore =

American judge (1917–2017)

- Palmore in 1975

Chief Justice of the Kentucky Supreme Court
- In office October 18, 1977 – October 2, 1982
- Preceded by: Scott Elgin Reed
- Succeeded by: Robert F. Stephens

Chief Justice of the Kentucky Court of Appeals
- In office January 1, 1973 – January 7, 1974
- Preceded by: Samuel Steinfeld
- Succeeded by: Earl T. Osborne
- In office July 1, 1966 – January 1, 1968
- Preceded by: John R. Moremen
- Succeeded by: Squire Williams

Justice of the Kentucky Supreme Court
- In office January 1, 1976 – January 3, 1983
- Preceded by: Court established
- Succeeded by: William Gant

Justice of the Kentucky Court of Appeals
- In office November 20, 1959 – December 31, 1975
- Preceded by: Thomas E. Sandidge
- Succeeded by: Court became Supreme Court

Commonwealth's attorney for Kentucky's 5th district
- In office 1955–1959
- Preceded by: Faust Y. Simpson

Personal details
- Born: August 6, 1917 Panama Canal Zone
- Died: July 4, 2017 (aged 99) Frankfort, Kentucky, U.S.
- Party: Democratic
- Spouse: Carol Pate Palmore
- Education: University of Louisville School of Law
- Profession: Lawyer, judge

Military service
- Allegiance: United States
- Battles/wars: World War II

John Stanley Palmore Jr. (August 6, 1917 – July 4, 2017) was an American judge who served as Justice of the Kentucky Court of Appeals from 1959 until it became the Supreme Court of Kentucky in 1975, and on the latter court until his retirement, in 1982. He served as chief justice in 1966, in 1973, and from 1977 to 1982.

== Early life ==
Palmore's grandfather, Andrew Houston Palmore, was a member of the 5th Cavalry Regiment of the Union Army during the American Civil War.

Palmore's family moved to Bowling Green, Kentucky, in 1929, and he graduated from Bowling Green High School in 1934. He then enrolled at Western Kentucky University and also joined the National Guard. After two years at Western Kentucky, he matriculated to the University of Louisville School of Law. In 1939, he graduated cum laude from law school.

Palmore began the practice of law in Henderson, Kentucky, but suspended his practice to serve in World War II. On his return from the war, he served as city attorney for Henderson. On January 2, 1954, he began a two-year term as city attorney for Sebree.

== Political career ==
After the death of 5th district circuit judge Marlin L. Blackwell in 1955, Governor Earle C. Clements appointed the district's Commonwealth's attorney, Faust Y. Simpson, to the judgeship and Palmore as the new Commonwealth's attorney, possibly as a reward for supporting Clements' ally, Bert T. Combs, in the 1955 Democratic gubernatorial primary against Clements' factional foe, A. B. "Happy" Chandler. Palmore began his service on October 12, 1955, and was immediately tasked with prosecuting a high-profile murder case against Ben Charles Sitton, who was accused of killing police officer Jack Rainier during a traffic stop. The Fraternal Order of Police, concerned that Palmore's inexperience would result in Sitton's acquittal, asked Palmore to allow a more experienced attorney to try the case, but Palmore refused. On January 27, 1956, after just over three hours of deliberation, a jury returned a guilty verdict against Sitton and recommended a death sentence. The verdict was overturned on a technicality, and Palmore was forced to try it again, winning a second conviction on June 29, 1956; the second jury recommended a sentence of life imprisonment.

Between the two Sitton trials, Palmore faced a challenge in the Democratic primary from State Representative Carl D. Melton. Melton was a Chandler ally, while Palmore had sided with Clements. Chandler hailed from Henderson County, the most populous county in the district, while Clements was from neighboring Union County, the district's second most populous. Due to the population and advantage and Chandler's decisive victory over Combs in the previous year's gubernatorial primary, Melton was expected to defeat Palmore easily. Palmore's successful prosecution of Sitton, combined with a strong turnout in Union County, helped him to a 626-vote victory in the primary, which was the de facto general election in the heavily Democratic district.

Palmore continued as Commonwealth's attorney until he was elected to the Kentucky Court of Appeals in 1959. In 1966 and 1973, he served as the court's chief justice. In 1969, Palmore chaired a 10-person committee charged with revising the Kentucky Criminal Code.

In 1976, an amendment to the Kentucky Constitution renamed the court to the Kentucky Supreme Court and created a new Court of Appeals below it. Palmore and the other justices on the old Court of Appeals were retained on the Kentucky Supreme Court. Palmore served as the court's chief justice from 1977 until his retirement in 1982. In his judicial career, he wrote more than 800 opinions.

== Later life ==
After his retirement, Palmore became a legal advisor to then-Lieutenant Governor Martha Layne Collins. When Governor John Y. Brown, Jr. fell critically ill following heart surgery in 1983, Palmore advised Collins to take the role of acting governor. After Collins was elected governor, her administration hired Palmore to represent the state in several legal cases. Under a standard practice of rejecting all personal services contracts that paid more than $75 per hour, a legislative committee initially rejected Palmore's contracts, which paid $125 per hour, but Collins representatives overruled them.

In 1984, Palmore moved back to Henderson and re-opened his law practice. Later that year, he was named to the board of regents for Western Kentucky University, where he served until 1988. He was awarded an honorary doctor of laws degree from Eastern Kentucky University in 1984. In 1986, he moved back to Central Kentucky to join his son, John W. Palmore, in the Lexington law firm of Jackson, Kelly, Williams & Palmore. He considered running for governor in 1987, but ultimately decided to manage the campaign of former Governor Julian Carroll.

Palmore received the Brandeis Medal from the University of Louisville School of Law in 1987 and was named an Alumni Fellow in 1993. Also in 1993, he was inducted into the Western Kentucky University Hall of Distinguished Alumni. For his defense of freedom of the press, he was given The First Prize by the Louisville chapter of the Society of Professional Journalists.

In retirement, Palmore began writing history books. He also published two autobiographies, An Opinionated Career: Memoirs of a Kentucky Judge in 2003 and From the Panama Canal to Elkhorn Creek in 2006. In 2014, Palmore was inducted into the Kentucky Bar Foundation's "Senator Henry Clay Circle". His wife, Carol Pate Palmore, died December 6, 2015. Palmore died on July 4, 2017, at age 99.
