= Joe Lane Travis =

American politician (1931–2019)

Minority Leader of the Kentucky Senate
- In office January 11, 1985 – January 6, 1987
- Preceded by: Gene Huff
- Succeeded by: John D. Rogers

Member of the Kentucky Senate from the 9th district
- In office November 1981 – January 1, 1989
- Preceded by: Walter Arnold Baker
- Succeeded by: Walter Arnold Baker

Personal details
- Born: July 6, 1931 Temple Hill, Kentucky, U.S.
- Died: March 4, 2019 (aged 87) Glasgow, Kentucky, U.S.
- Party: Republican

Joe Lane Travis (July 6, 1931 – March 4, 2019) was an American politician in the state of Kentucky. He served in the Kentucky Senate as a Republican from 1981 to 1989. Travis died in Glasgow, Kentucky on March 4, 2019, at the age of 87.
