= Amos H. Eblen =

American judge and legal scholar (1906–1980)

Amos Hall Eblen

Judge of the Kentucky Court of Appeals
- In office 1958–1960
- Constituency: 5th Appellate District

Personal details
- Born: April 26, 1906 Alton, Missouri
- Died: December 1, 1980 (aged 74) Frankfort, Kentucky
- Party: Democratic
- Education: Southwest Baptist University (attended); Drury University (attended); University of Missouri (LL.B.); Harvard Law School (S.J.D.)
- Profession: Lawyer, law professor, judge

Amos Hall Eblen (April 26, 1906 – December 1980) was an American legal scholar and jurist who served as a judge on the Kentucky Court of Appeals—then the highest court in the Commonwealth of Kentucky—from 1958 to 1960. Eblen served on the law faculty at the University of Kentucky College of Law until 1945, when he resigned to enter private law practice and become Executive Secretary of the Judicial Council of Kentucky.
