= Nicholas King (judge) =

Kentucky judge (born 1945)

Justice of the Kentucky Supreme Court
- In office December 11, 1995 – November 25, 1996
- Appointed by: Brereton C. Jones
- Preceded by: Charles M. Leibson
- Succeeded by: Martin E. Johnstone

Commonwealth's Attorney of the 30th Kentucky Circuit Court
- In office November 10, 1992 – December 8, 1995
- Preceded by: Ernest Jasmin
- Succeeded by: Marc S. Murphy

Personal details
- Born: February 28, 1945 (age 81) Brooklyn, New York, U.S.
- Party: Democratic
- Education: Florida State University (BA); University of Oklahoma (MA); University of Louisville (JD)

Nicholas Neal King (born February 28, 1945) is an American lawyer from Louisville, Kentucky, who served as a justice of the Kentucky Supreme Court from December 1995 to November 1996. He previously served as the Commonwealth's Attorney of the 30th Kentucky Circuit Court from 1992 to 1995.

== Early life ==
King was born on February 28, 1945, in Brooklyn, New York. He received a Bachelor of Arts from Florida State University, followed by a Master of Arts from the University of Oklahoma and a Juris Doctor from the University of Louisville.

== Judicial career ==
King was first appointed Commonwealth's Attorney by governor Brereton C. Jones to fill the remainder of Ernest Jasmin's term, who had resigned to become a judge of the 30th Circuit Court. He took the oath of office on November 10, 1992. He was reelected to a full term in office in 1993. Prior to public service, King was a personal injury lawyer in Louisville from 1974 to 1992. He was again appointed by governor Jones in December 1995 to succeed supreme court justice Charles M. Leibson, who resigned due to health issues. He lost reelection in a special election the following November to Martin E. Johnstone.
