= Robert O. Lukowsky =

American judge (1927–1981)

Robert O. Lukowsky Jr.
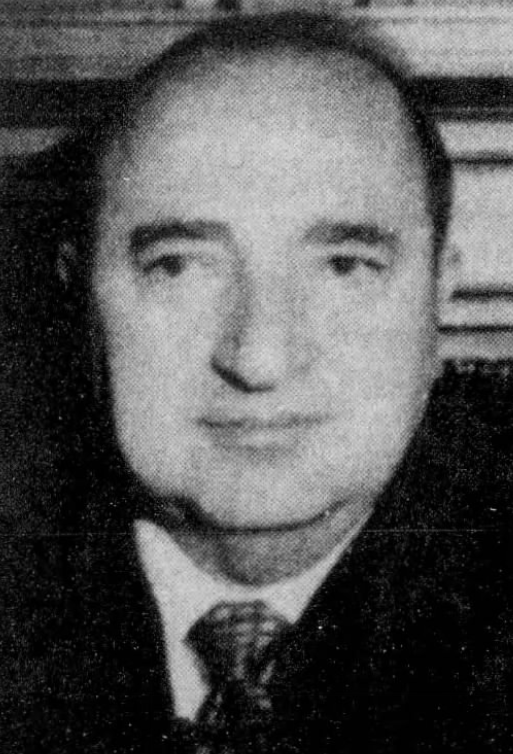
- Lukowsky, c. 1981

Justice of the Kentucky Supreme Court
- In office January 1, 1976 – December 5, 1981
- Preceded by: Court established
- Succeeded by: John J. O'Hara

Justice of the Kentucky Court of Appeals
- In office January 6, 1975 – December 31, 1975
- Preceded by: James B. Milliken
- Succeeded by: Court became Supreme Court

Judge of the 16th Kentucky Circuit Court
- In office December 3, 1962 – January 6, 1975
- Preceded by: Seat created
- Succeeded by: Daniel J. Goodenough

Personal details
- Born: August 23, 1927 Covington, Kentucky, U.S.
- Died: December 5, 1981 (aged 54) Cincinnati, Ohio, U.S.
- Cause of death: Cancer
- Spouse: Rosemary
- Education: University of Cincinnati Law School
- Profession: Attorney

Military service
- Branch/service: United States Army
- Battles/wars: World War II

Robert Owen Lukowsky Jr. (August 23, 1927 – December 5, 1981) was a justice of the Kentucky Supreme Court from 1975 to 1981.

Born in Covington, Kentucky, Lukowsky was the son of Robert O. and Esther Agnes Cole Lukowsky. His paternal grandparents were Russian immigrants. Lukowsky graduated from St. Xavier High School in 1945 and from the University of Cincinnati Law School. He served in the Army Corps of Engineers at the end of World War II and was called to the Kentucky bar in 1949. Lukowsky was the trial commissioner in Kenton County from 1952 to 1955. In 1962, Governor Bert T. Combs appointed him the youngest circuit court judge in the history of Kentucky. He was also a professor at Northern Kentucky University.

He served several terms as circuit judge in Kenton County and helped chart Kentucky's judicial reform and was on the committee that supervised the rewrite of Kentucky's penal code. In 1974, he was elected to the Court of Appeals, which became the Supreme Court after an amendment to the state constitution the following year. He was critical of the legislature's attempt to change the worker's compensation statute in 1978, but voted with the majority to uphold the act. In possibly his most famous dissent, Lukowsky argued against the posting of the Ten Commandments at every courthouse in Kentucky despite his strong religious convictions. He was considered for a seat at the U.S. Court of Appeals of the Sixth District.

He came down with cancer in August 1981, and died on December 5 at the Good Samaritan Hospital in Cincinnati. Lukowsky is survived by his wife Rosemary. The Robert O. Lukowsky award is given annually to the faculty member of the Salmon P. Chase College of Law who is most committed to teaching and developing law students.
