= James B. Milliken (judge) =

American politician

Chief Justice of the Kentucky Court of Appeals
- In office January 4, 1971 – January 3, 1972
- Preceded by: Edward P. Hill
- Succeeded by: Samuel Steinfeld
- In office July 1, 1963 – January 4, 1965
- Preceded by: Brady M. Stewart
- Succeeded by: John R. Moremen
- In office January 2, 1956 – July 1, 1957
- Preceded by: Brady M. Stewart
- Succeeded by: John R. Moremen

Justice of the Kentucky Court of Appeals
- In office January 1, 1951 – January 6, 1975
- Preceded by: William H. Rees
- Succeeded by: Robert O. Lukowsky

Member of the Kentucky House of Representatives from the 67th district
- In office January 1, 1934 – January 1, 1936
- Preceded by: Elmer T. Gray
- Succeeded by: Carl Scheben

Personal details
- Born: August 7, 1900 Louisville, Kentucky, US
- Died: August 11, 1988 (aged 88) Frankfort, Kentucky, US
- Party: Democratic

James Butler Milliken (August 7, 1900 – August 11, 1988) was an American attorney, politician, and jurist who served as a member of the Kentucky Court of Appeals from 1951 to 1975. During his tenure, he served three terms as chief justice:1956 to 1957, 1963 to 1964, and 1971 to 1973. He previously served one term as a member of the Kentucky House of Representatives.

== Early life and education ==
Milliken was born in Louisville, Kentucky in 1900, grew up in Bellevue, Kentucky and graduated from Centre College where he was a member of Phi Kappa Tau fraternity. He graduated from Yale Law School in 1926. After two years at Yale, he returned home to teach math and English at Dayton (Kentucky) High School where he was also coach of the basketball team. In addition to teaching and coaching, he attended classes at the University of Cincinnati College of Law, eventually returning to Yale to graduate.

== Career ==
Milliken began his practice of law in Cincinnati and Campbell County, Kentucky, where he became city attorney of Southgate. From 1934 to 1936, he served as a member of the Kentucky House of Representatives from Kentucky's 67th House district. He also served as chairman of the Kentucky Workers Compensation Board.

After his election to the Kentucky Court of Appeals in 1951, Milliken was an advocate for judicial reform and modernization. He was instrumental in bringing about a judicial retirement system in Kentucky and in the formation of the Kentucky Supreme Court.

After his retirement from the bench on January 6, 1975, he taught constitutional law at the Salmon P. Chase College of Law and was given Chase's Distinguished Service Award.
