= William Graves (judge) =

American judge (born 1935)

Justice of the Kentucky Supreme Court
- In office December 11, 1995 – January 1, 2007
- Preceded by: William Fuqua
- Succeeded by: Bill Cunningham

Judge of the 2nd Kentucky Circuit Court
- In office January 23, 1989 – December 11, 1995
- Preceded by: Lloyd Emery
- Succeeded by: Jeff Hines

Judge of the 2nd Kentucky District Court
- In office February 1984 – January 23, 1989
- Preceded by: Ron Daniels
- Succeeded by: Mary Byrd

Personal details
- Born: John William Graves; October 17, 1935 (age 90)
- Spouse: Mary Ann Brievogel
- Education: University of Notre Dame; University of Kentucky College of Law
- Profession: Lawyer

Military service
- Allegiance: United States
- Branch/service: United States Army
- Rank: Colonel
- Awards: Armed Forces Reserve Medal; Army Commendation Medal; Meritorious Service Medal; Army Reserve Component Achievement Medal (x3)

John William "Bill" Graves (born October 17, 1935) is a former justice of the Kentucky Supreme Court, serving from 1995 to 2006.

== Early life ==
Graves graduated from St. Mary High School in Paducah, Kentucky. He then attended the University of Notre Dame on a scholarship. In 1953, his freshman year at Notre Dame, he became part of a group of seven friends called "The Gang" that also included future talk show host Phil Donahue. Both Graves and Donahue graduated in 1957. Graves then earned a law degree from the University of Kentucky College of Law. He returned to Paducah and opened a law practice.

Graves was a judge advocate general in the United States Army, on active duty and as a reserve, for 35 years. He received training at the Command and General Staff College, the Air War College, and the National Defense University. He received the Armed Forces Reserve Medal, the Army Commendation Medal, the Meritorious Service Medal, and three Army Reserve Component Achievement Medals. He retired with the rank of colonel.

Graves married Mary Ann Brievogel, and the couple had two sons, Tony and Kevin.

== Legal career ==
During his time as a lawyer, Graves was also a justice of the peace and acted as trial commissioner for the Paducah Police Court and the McCracken County Quarterly Court. After practicing law for 20 years, Graves was elected first as a circuit judge and then as a district judge in McCracken County. After Justice Thomas B. Spain announced his retirement from the Kentucky Supreme Court in June 1995, Graves announced he would resign his position to seek Governor Brereton Jones's appointment to fill the vacancy and would be a candidate in the special election for the balance of Spain's term, which would not expire until January 1999. Jones appointed retired circuit court judge William Fuqua to fill the vacancy, but Fuqua said he would not be a candidate in the special election. Graves was one of six candidates in the special election for the remainder of Spain's term. With 15,496 votes, he finished about 650 votes ahead of his nearest challenger, Charles W. Boteler Jr.; the remaining candidates were Will Shadoan (14,581 votes), Rick Johnson (14,490 votes), Richard Hayes Lewis (12,338 votes) and Christopher "Kit" Hancock (5,013 votes).

At the expiration of Spain's unexpired term, Graves announced he would seek re-election. Rick Johnson, a justice of the Kentucky Court of Appeals and a challenger from the 1995 special election, also sought the seat. Graves won the rematch for a full, eight-year term by 2,200 votes.

In 2004, Graves announced he would not seek another term on the court, but later changed his mind. For the third time in as many elections, Johnson was one of Graves' opponents, along with Circuit Judge Bill Cunningham. Graves refused to accept campaign donations, and in March 2006, just ahead of the nonpartisan May primary, he announced he would withdraw from the race, citing an unwillingness to invest enough time and money to make a competitive race.
