= Scott Elgin Reed =

American judge

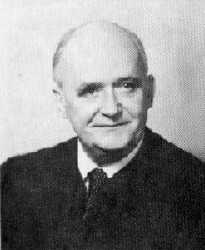

Senior Judge of the United States District Court for the Eastern District of Kentucky
- In office August 1, 1988 – February 17, 1994

Judge of the United States District Court for the Eastern District of Kentucky
- In office November 2, 1979 – August 1, 1988
- Appointed by: Jimmy Carter
- Preceded by: Seat established by 92 Stat. 1629
- Succeeded by: Joseph Martin Hood

Chief Justice of the Kentucky Supreme Court
- In office January 1, 1976 – October 18, 1977
- Preceded by: Court established
- Succeeded by: John S. Palmore

Chief Justice of the Kentucky Court of Appeals
- In office January 6, 1975 – December 31, 1975
- Preceded by: Earl T. Osborne
- Succeeded by: Court became Supreme Court

Justice of the Kentucky Supreme Court
- In office January 1, 1976 – November 2, 1979
- Preceded by: Court established
- Succeeded by: Robert F. Stephens

Justice of the Kentucky Court of Appeals
- In office January 6, 1969 – December 31, 1975
- Preceded by: Squire Williams
- Succeeded by: Court became Supreme Court

Personal details
- Born: Scott Elgin Reed; July 3, 1921 Lexington, Kentucky]
- Died: February 17, 1994 (aged 72) Lexington, Kentucky]
- Education: University of Kentucky College of Law (LLB)

Scott Elgin Reed (July 3, 1921 – February 17, 1994) was a justice of the Kentucky Supreme Court and a United States district judge of the United States District Court for the Eastern District of Kentucky.

== Education and career ==
Born in Lexington, Kentucky, Reed received a Bachelor of Laws from the University of Kentucky College of Law in 1945. He was in private practice in Lexington from 1944 to 1964. He served as a judge first on the Fayette County Circuit Court, 1st Division, from 1964 to 1969, and then on the Kentucky Court of Appeals, 5th Appellate District, from 1969 to 1976. He was chief justice of the Supreme Court of Kentucky from 1976 to 1978, remaining on that court as a justice until 1979.

== Federal judicial service ==
On August 28, 1979, Reed was nominated by President Jimmy Carter to a new seat on the United States District Court for the Eastern District of Kentucky created by 92 Stat. 1629. He was confirmed by the United States Senate on October 31, 1979, and received his commission on November 2, 1979. He assumed senior status due to a certified disability on August 1, 1988, serving in that capacity until his death, on February 17, 1994, in Lexington.

== Sources ==
Legal offices
Preceded by Seat established by 92 Stat. 1629	Judge of the United States District Court for the Eastern District of Kentucky; 1979–1988	Succeeded by Joseph Martin Hood
