= John D. Rogers =

American politician

John Rogers

Minority Leader of the Kentucky Senate
- In office January 6, 1987 – November 10, 1994
- Preceded by: Joe Lane Travis
- Succeeded by: Dan Kelly

Member of the Kentucky Senate from the 15th district
- In office January 1, 1976 – November 10, 1994
- Preceded by: Norman Farris
- Succeeded by: James Crase

Personal details
- Born: July 18, 1940 (age 86)
- Party: Republican

John D. Rogers (born July 18, 1940) is an American politician from Kentucky who was a member of the Kentucky Senate from 1976 to 1994. Rogers was first elected in 1975 after incumbent senator Norman Farris retired. He resigned from the senate in November 1994 following his conviction on federal corruption charges.
