= Charles M. Leibson =

American judge (1929–1995)

Justice of the Kentucky Supreme Court
- In office January 3, 1983 – December 3, 1995
- Preceded by: Marvin J. Sternberg
- Succeeded by: Nicholas King

Judge of the 30th Kentucky Circuit Court
- In office January 5, 1976 – November 1982
- Preceded by: E. Skiles Jones
- Succeeded by: Kenneth G. Corey

Personal details
- Born: June 30, 1929
- Died: December 10, 1995 (aged 66)
- Party: Republican

Charles M. Leibson (June 30, 1929 – December 10, 1995) was a justice of the Kentucky Supreme Court from 1983 until his resignation in 1995.

Leibson was "born into a family of lawyers", and was the valedictorian of his class at the University of Louisville School of Law. He practiced in his father's firm until 1975, when he was elected to the Circuit Court of Jefferson County, Kentucky. In 1982, he won election to the state supreme court. He wrote a noted opinion in Commonwealth v. Wasson, striking down as unconstitutional Kentucky's law against homosexual sodomy.

Leibson announced his resignation from the court due to lymphoma in October 1995, and died at his home in Louisville that December, at the age of 66.

Political offices
Preceded by Marvin J. Sternberg	Justice of the Kentucky Supreme Court; 1983–1995	Succeeded by Nicholas King
