= David Buckingham (judge) =

American judge

Justice of the Kentucky Supreme Court
- In office April 8, 2019 – December 11, 2019
- Appointed by: Matt Bevin
- Preceded by: Bill Cunningham
- Succeeded by: Christopher Shea Nickell

Judge of the Kentucky Court of Appeals
- In office December 1996 – May 1, 2006
- Preceded by: J. William Howerton
- Succeeded by: Donna L. Dixon

Judge of the 42nd Kentucky Circuit Court
- In office November 1986 – December 1996
- Preceded by: John Clay Lovett
- Succeeded by: Dennis Ray Foust

Judge of the 42nd Kentucky District Court
- In office January 4, 1982 – November 1986
- Preceded by: Sid Easley
- Succeeded by: Max Wallis Parker

Personal details
- Parent: Buddy Buckingham (father)
- Education: Murray State University; University of Louisville School of Law (JD)

David Buckingham is a former Justice of the Kentucky Supreme Court.

== Education ==
Buckingham graduated from Murray State University in 1974 and received his Juris Doctor from the University of Louisville School of Law in 1977.

== State judicial career ==
He began his 30-year judicial career in 1982 as the district judge for the 42nd Judicial District. Following that role, Judge Buckingham served as the circuit judge for the 42nd Judicial Circuit from 1986 to 1996. Judge Buckingham served as a Kentucky Court of Appeals judge from 1996 to 2006 and as a senior judge on the Kentucky Court of Appeals from 2006 to 2010. After serving on the Kentucky Supreme Court in 2019,he later served as a special judge on the Kentucky Court of Appeals in 2020 and thereafter as a special judge for the 42 Judicial Circuit in 2022.

== Appointment to Kentucky Supreme Court ==
Judge Buckingham was one of three candidates to put forth his name for consideration for appointment for the Kentucky Supreme Court. On March 27, 2019, Governor Matt Bevin appointed him to the Supreme Court, to the seat vacated by the retirement of Justice Bill Cunningham. Buckingham remained on the court until December 11, 2019, when former Kentucky Court of Appeals judge Christopher S. Nickell, who had won a special election in November 2019, was sworn in.

Legal offices
Preceded by Bill Cunningham	Justice of the Kentucky Supreme Court; 2019	Succeeded by Christopher S. Nickell
