= Samuel Steinfeld =

American judge

Chief Justice of the Kentucky Court of Appeals
- In office January 3, 1972 – January 1, 1973
- Preceded by: James B. Milliken
- Succeeded by: John S. Palmore

Justice of the Kentucky Court of Appeals
- In office January 2, 1967 – January 6, 1975
- Preceded by: John R. Moremen
- Succeeded by: Marvin J. Sternberg

Personal details
- Born: February 15, 1906 Louisville, Kentucky, U.S.
- Died: November 22, 2007 (aged 101)

Samuel Steinfeld (February 15, 1906 in Louisville, Kentucky – November 22, 2007) was the Chief Justice of the Kentucky Court of Appeals while it was the highest court in the state. He was elected to the court in 1966 and became chief justice in 1972. He retired in 1974.

== See also ==
- List of Jewish American jurists
