= The Bar Complex =

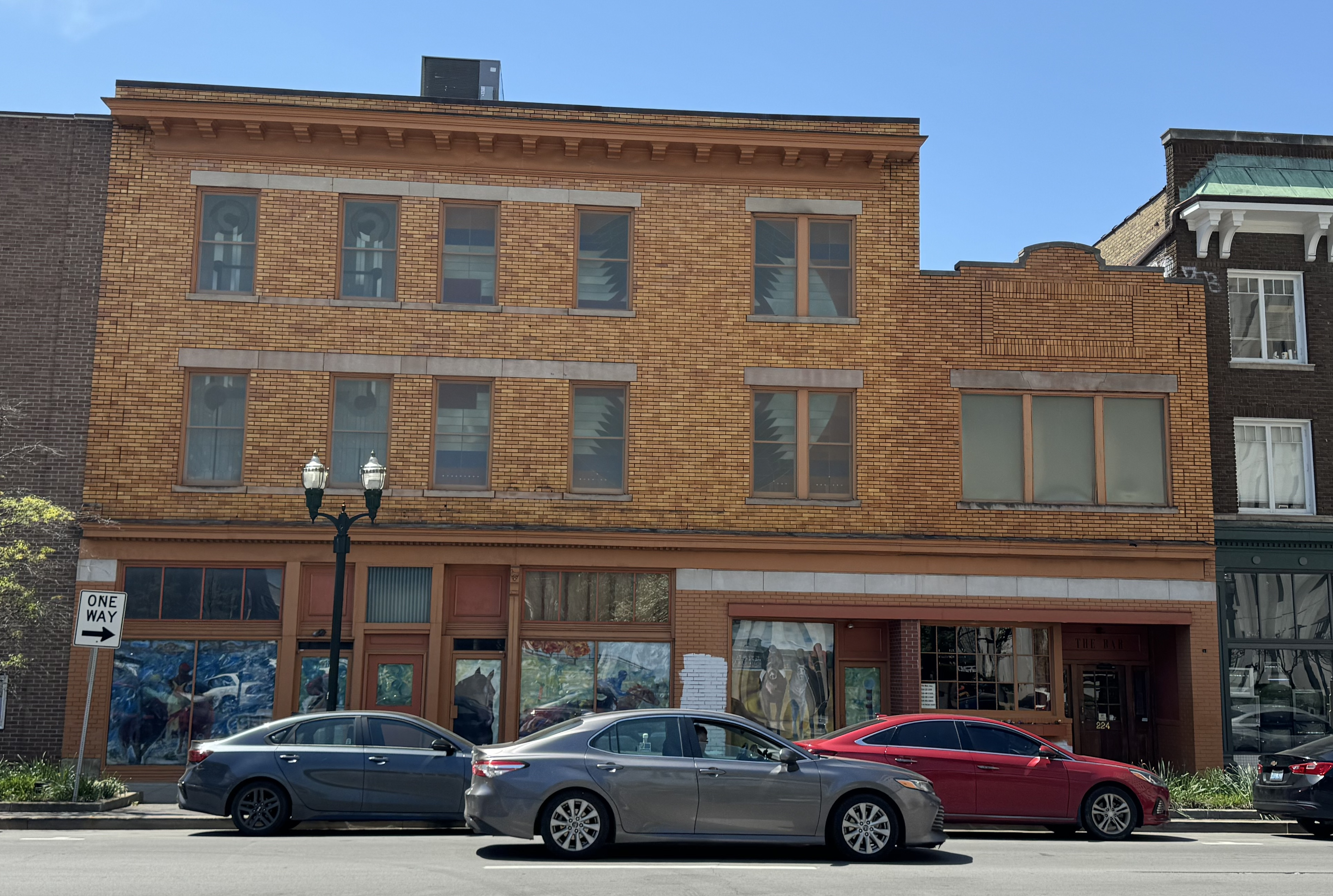
- Exterior of The Bar Complex
- Former names: Mayfair Bar; Southern Cocktail Lounge; The Gilded Cage; The Living Room; Johnny Angel Disco

General information
- Location: 224 East Main St., Lexington, Kentucky
- Coordinates: 38.04422603397613°N 84.49487003493006°W

Technical details
- Floor area: 18,000 sq ft (1,700 m^{2})

Website
- thebarcomplex.com

The Bar Complex is a gay bar located at 224 East Main St. in downtown Lexington, Kentucky, United States. While the building has gone through various name changes, it is remembered as gay-friendly as early as 1939, it has been an openly gay bar since 1963. The bar is 18,000 square feet (1,700 m^{2}) between its two floors, and includes three bars, a stage for drag shows, and a two-story tall disco-era dance floor.

== History ==
Since its earliest iteration as the Mayfair Bar in 1939, LGTBQ Kentuckians gathered discreetly at this location. In 1953, the space opened as the Southern Cocktail Lounge, also remembered by former patrons as gay-friendly.

In 1963, a gay couple from Chicago, Illinois, John Hill and Estel Wilson, purchased the bar and opened The Gilded Cage.

This was the first time that the bar was openly understood as a gay bar. The Gilded Cage is remembered as one of Rock Hudson's favorite spots when he visited Lexington, as recalled by the Lexington Herald-Leader.

In 1967, The Living Room Restaurant and Bar opened. It was during this period that drag shows were first performed in the location, using the cinder-block room at the back of 224 East Main Street. The second floor became the dance floor, accessed by a wrought-iron spiral staircase. The bar was referred to as "The Gayest Spot in Town" on matchbooks and newspaper advertisements.

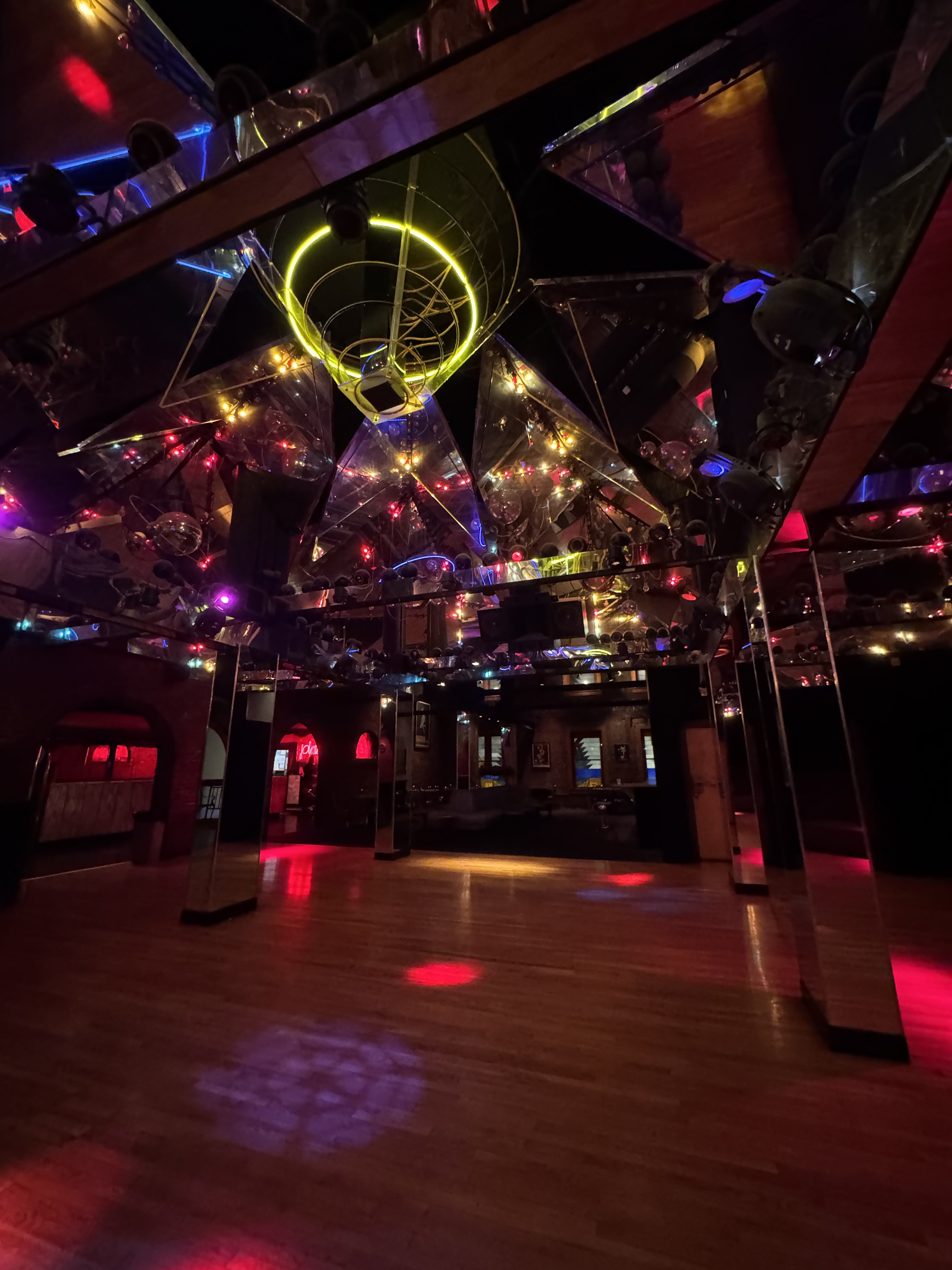
Dance floor located on the second floor of The Bar Complex

Due to its central location in Kentucky, the bar quickly became a gathering place for LGBTQ Kentuckians across the state. In 1968, Jim Meade and Luke Barlowe met at the Living Room. Forty-seven years later, they would be one of the Kentucky couples who sued Governor Steve Beshear as part of the 2015 Obergefell v. Hodges case, which legalized same-sex marriage in the United States. In 1970, The Living Room was the site of the wedding between Marjorie Jones and Tracey Knight. In July 1970, the two would bring a lawsuit against the Louisville County Clerk for refusing to issue a marriage license. They were the first lesbian couple in the U.S. to sue for a marriage license.

In 1971, Bill Sheehan, a gay lawyer from New York City, purchased the Living Room bar.

On July 12, 1973, 224 East Main Street caught on fire, damaging the interior of the bar along with several other buildings. After repairs, Sheehan reopened 224 East Main Street in 1974, renaming the business as Café Montparnasse.

In 1976, Sheehan purchased both 224 East Main Street and 226 East Main Street. Sheehan and his partner, John Davis, renovated both buildings and connected the two. The "million-dollar dance floor" was designed by the creators of New York City's infamous Studio 54.

After these major renovations, the bar reopened on May 27, 1978, as Johnny Angel Disco. During the opening night, a bomb threat is called into the police, requiring the building to be evacuated for a short time. On December 19, 1978, just a few months after its opening, Grace Jones performed on the dance floor at Johnny Angel.

On October 31, 1980, Johnny Angel was renamed The Bar Complex. Today, in honor of its history, The Bar Complex refers to its three main areas after its previous names: The front bar as "The Living Room", drag show room as "The Gilded Cage", and the dance floor as "Johnny Angel".

=== Overturning of Kentucky's sodomy law ===
The back entrance and parking lot of the Bar Complex was the site of Jeffrey Wasson's arrest in 1986. Wasson, a 23-year-old nursing student, was charged with solicitation of same-sex sodomy as a result of an undercover sting operation conducted by the Lexington police. After Commonwealth v. Wasson, the Kentucky Supreme Court ultimately struck down the state's anti-sodomy laws on September 24, 1992, in a 4–3 ruling.

== Legacy ==
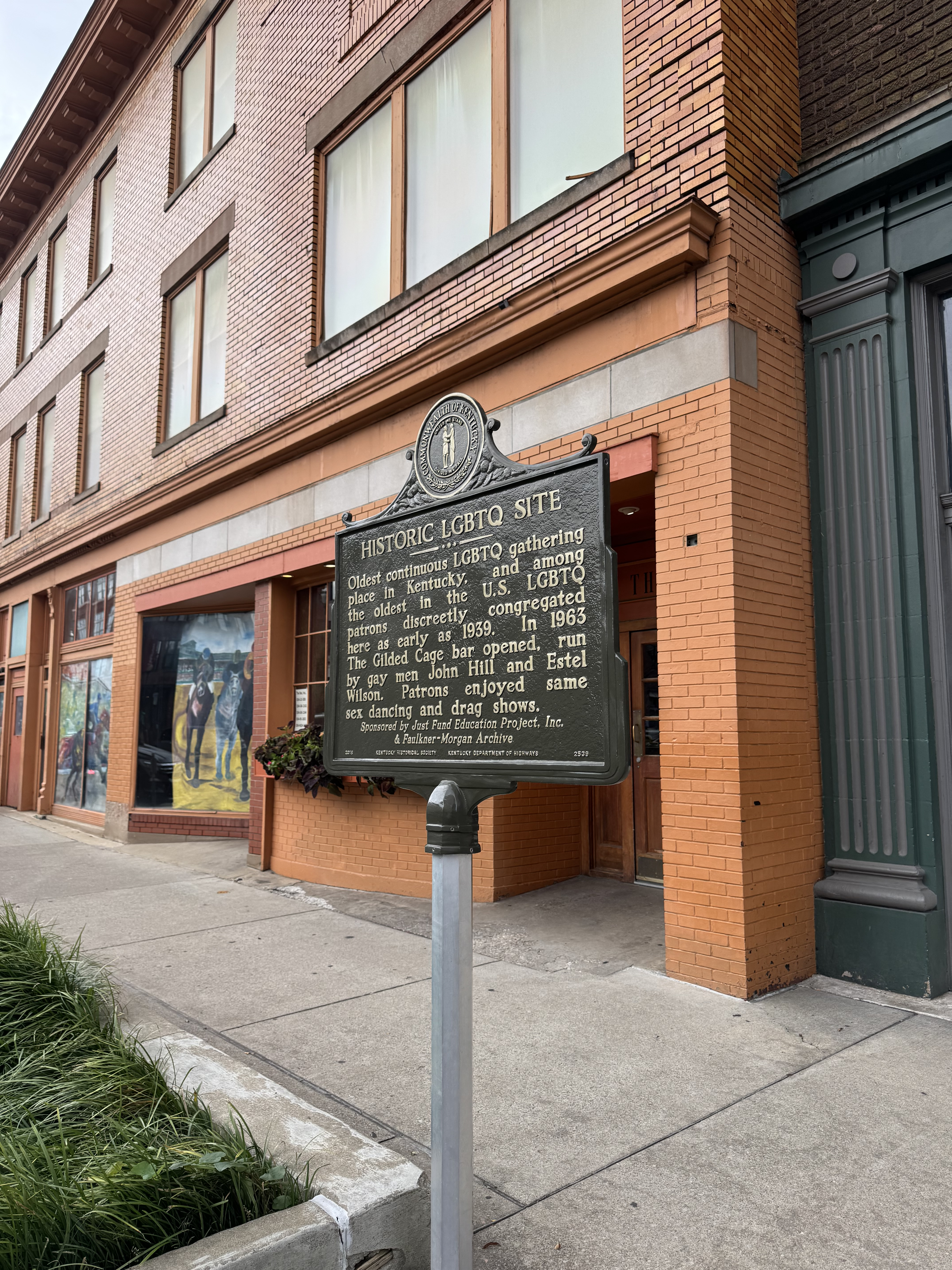
Kentucky Historical Marker 2539 located outside of The Bar Complex at 224 East Main St. in Lexington, Kentucky

There are two state historic markers located in close proximity to The Bar Complex: Kentucky Historical Marker #2539, "Historic LGBTQ Site", dedicated on June 3, 2018 and Kentucky Historical Marker #2545, "Commonwealth of Kentucky v. Jeffery Wasson", dedicated on June 3, 2018.

The Bar Complex is also part of the Faulkner Morgan Archive's 2020 Pride of Place Walking tour of Lexington's LGBTQ historic sites.

On December 21, 2022, The Bar Complex and Crossings Lexington, another gay bar in Lexington, were vandalized with homophobic graffiti. Police arrested 51-year-old William White near the site of the bar and charged him with first-degree criminal mischief, second-degree criminal mischief, and charges from an outstanding warrant, as well as took a hate/bias report. When announcing the vandalism, Lexington Mayor Linda Gorton shared:

We’ve been made aware of threatening and hateful graffiti at two local LGBTQ-owned businesses. This City will not tolerate hate-filled acts. Our Lexington Police Department is already on the case. During this season of love and peace, let’s stand united against ignorance and hate.

In 2025, The Bar Complex was voted as Lexington's "#1 Best LGBTQIA Spot" in Smiley Pete's 2025 Best of Lex.

== See also ==
- List of LGBTQ bars
