= Bill Cunningham (judge) =

American judge (born 1944)

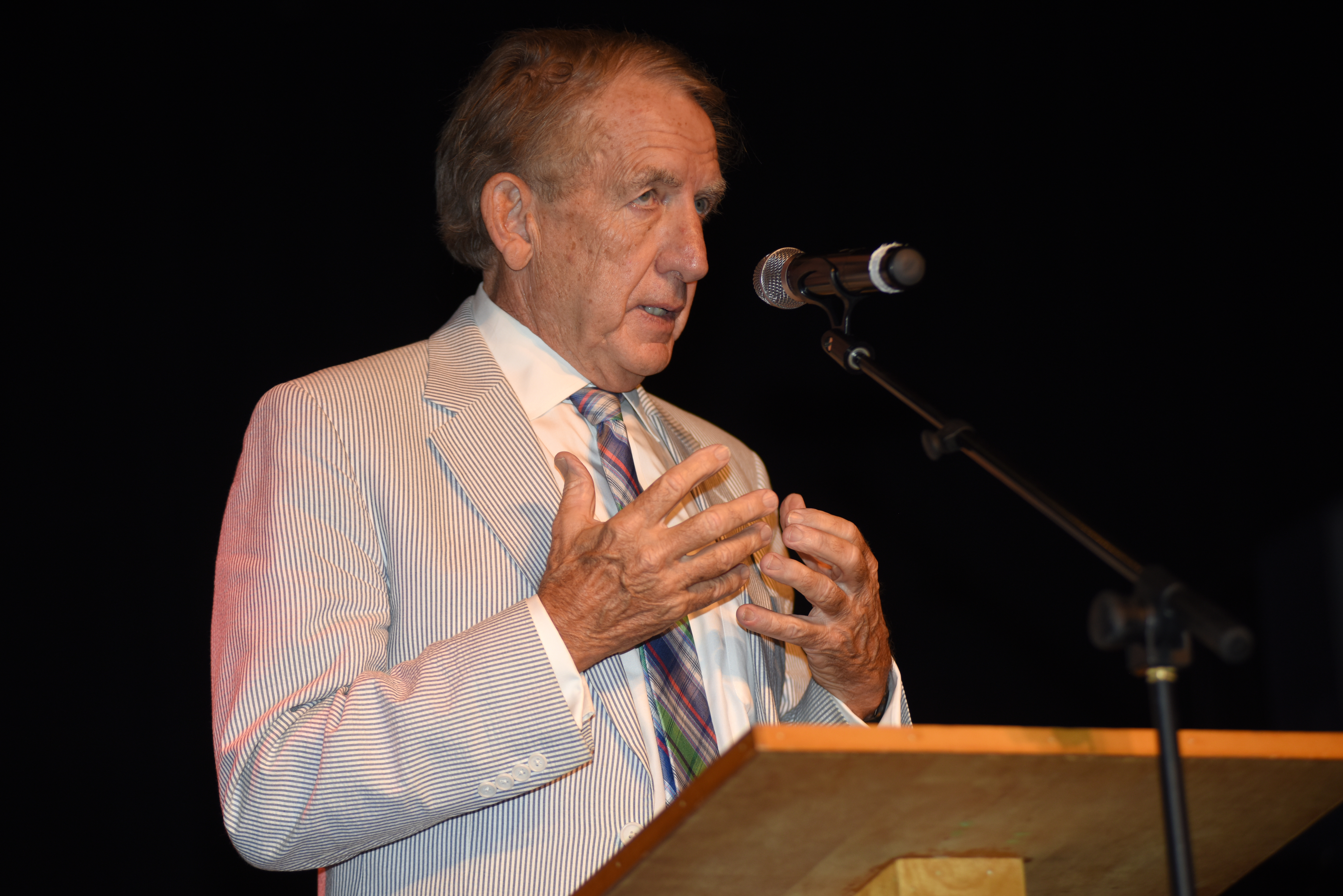
- Cunningham in 2016

Justice of the Kentucky Supreme Court
- In office January 1, 2007 – February 1, 2019
- Preceded by: William Graves
- Succeeded by: David Buckingham

Judge of the 56th Kentucky Circuit Court
- In office January 6, 1992 – January 1, 2007
- Preceded by: Willard B. Paxton
- Succeeded by: C. A. Woodall III

Commonwealth's Attorney of the 56th Kentucky Circuit Court
- In office November 1976 – January 4, 1988
- Preceded by: Circuit created by 1976 (ex. 1) Ky. Acts ch. 14
- Succeeded by: G. L. Ovey Jr.

Personal details
- Born: William Harold Cunningham; October 15, 1944 (age 81) Eddyville, Kentucky, U.S.
- Spouse: Paula Trull
- Children: 5, including Joe
- Education: Murray State University (BA); University of Kentucky (JD)

William Harold Cunningham (born October 15, 1944) is an American former prosecutor and former Justice of the Kentucky Supreme Court. He was elected to the court in November 2006 to represent the first Appellate District. He announced he would retire in early 2019.

== Education ==
Cunningham earned his bachelor's degree from Murray State University in 1966 and his Juris Doctor in 1969 from the University of Kentucky College of Law.

== Judicial career ==
Cunningham served the court system in several capacities before entering his judicial career. He was the Eddyville city attorney from 1974 to 1991 and public defender for the Kentucky State Penitentiary from 1974 to 1976. He served as Commonwealth's Attorney for the 56th Judicial District from 1976 to 1988. During his tenure in that position, he was voted the Outstanding Commonwealth Attorney of Kentucky by his peers.

Cunningham also served as a hearing officer for the Kentucky Board of Claims from 1981 to 1985 and as a trial commissioner for the Lyon County District court from 1989 to 1992.

Cunningham served as a circuit court judge for 15 years. He was elected to the Circuit Court Bench in November 1991 to serve the 56th Judicial Circuit, which consists of Caldwell, Livingston, Lyon and Trigg counties. He was re-elected in 1999 and served as circuit judge until January 2007.

He was elected in 2006 to a seat on the Kentucky Supreme Court. He retired on February 1, 2019, after a 40-year judicial career.

== Personal life ==
Born in Eddyville, Cunningham is a native of Kuttawa, Kentucky in Lyon County

He and his wife, Paula Trull, have five sons and eleven grandchildren. His son, Joe, is a former U.S. representative from South Carolina's 1st congressional district.
