= William Gant =

American judge (1919–1995)

Justice of the Kentucky Supreme Court
- In office January 3, 1983 – January 7, 1991
- Preceded by: John S. Palmore
- Succeeded by: Charles H. Reynolds

Justice of the Kentucky Court of Appeals
- In office August 17, 1976 – January 3, 1983
- Preceded by: Court established
- Succeeded by: John M. Miller

Personal details
- Born: William Milton Gant; November 25, 1919 Owensboro, Kentucky
- Died: September 10, 1995 (aged 75) Owensboro, Kentucky
- Spouse: Mary Ellen Price
- Children: 2 sons
- Education: Transylvania University; University of Kentucky College of Law
- Profession: Lawyer and judge

Military service
- Allegiance: United States
- Branch/service: United States Army Air Force
- Battles/wars: World War II

William Milton Gant (November 25, 1919 – September 10, 1995) was an justice of the Kentucky Court of Appeals from 1976 to 1982 and the Kentucky Supreme Court from 1983 to 1991.

== Early life and family ==
William Gant was born on November 25, 1919, in Owensboro, Kentucky. He attended Owensboro High School, graduating in 1936. He earned a Bachelor of Arts degree from Transylvania University in 1940. During World War II, he was a pilot instructor in the United States Army Air Force. After the war, he returned to Kentucky and matriculated to the University of Kentucky College of Law, where he received his law degree in 1946. He began practicing law in Owensboro in 1947.

Gant was a lifelong member of Owensboro's First Church of Christ Disciples of Christ Church, where The Messenger-Inquirer reported he had "held every major office", including elder. He married Mary Ellen Price, and the couple had two sons – Stuart Price Gant and Walter Gant. Walter was killed in an automobile accident in June 1988.

In the 1950s, Gant was a juvenile judge in Daviess County, Kentucky. Seeing a need for housing for the children who came before the court, he founded and was president of Daviess County Children's Center (later the Levy Memorial Home). As a member of the city's recreation board, he helped plan and open the Owensboro Sports Center. In 1958–59 and 1964–65, he served as president of the University of Kentucky Alumni Association. In 1968, he was appointed to the Transylvania University Board of Curators, serving until 1990.

== Political career ==
Gant's political career began with his election as Commonwealth's attorney for the 6th district in 1962. He held that office until 1976, when an amendment to the Kentucky Constitution reorganized the state's court system, restyling the extant Kentucky Court of Appeals as the Kentucky Supreme Court and creating a new Kentucky Court of Appeals, to which Gant was appointed. He served on the Court of Appeals until 1982, when he was elected without opposition to a seat on the Kentucky Supreme Court vacated by the retirement of John S. Palmore. He was considered one of the more conservative justices on the court.

== Later life and death ==
Gant retired from the Kentucky Supreme Court in 1991, citing declining health. The Kentucky Medical Association, Kentucky Council on Crime and Delinquency, Kappa Alpha Order and University of Kentucky Alumni Association all honored Gant with Distinguished Service Awards. He died of cancer on September 10, 1995, at his home in Owensboro, Kentucky.
