= Charles H. Reynolds =

American judge (1924–1996)

Justice of the Kentucky Supreme Court
- In office January 7, 1991 – January 27, 1996
- Preceded by: William Gant
- Succeeded by: Walter Arnold Baker

Personal details
- Born: October 10, 1924
- Died: January 27, 1996 (aged 71)

Charles H. Reynolds (October 10, 1924 – January 27, 1996) was a justice of the Kentucky Supreme Court from 1991 to 1996.

== Life and education ==
He was born October 10, 1924 in Warren County, Kentucky, the son of Charles H. Reynolds (Senior) and Hilda Stout Reynolds. He obtained a bachelor's degree from Western Kentucky University and then his law degree from the University of Louisville.

In World War II he served with the Army Air Force and was decorated with three Bronze Stars for heroism in combat.

He was a Catholic and active in his faith, his death was recognised by the local Bishop.

== Career ==
He started practicing law in 1950, going on to serve Bowling Green and Warren Count as city judge, county attorney, chairman of the planning and zoning commission and commissioner of the Bowling Green district court.

He was an appellate judge for 15 years and one of the original judges at the creation of the Kentucky Court of Appeals when it was created in 1976.

On November 6, 1990, Reynolds narrowly won the election against Willian S. Cooper to obtain the seat on the supreme court for the 2nd district, a seat that had been vacated as the presiding justice William Gant had retired due to health.

He was named "Kentucky Judge of the Year" in 1994.

One of his key decisions was in the "Steel Vest" case that made it difficult to dismiss Kentucky civil cases prior to trial. He was also recognised for opinions in rulings that crime victims have no standing in shock probation decisions, federal pensioners should get a tax refund on state income, and for upholding the disorderly conduct conviction of a woman who yelled obscenities at a military parade float.

In tribute to his career as a judge and for the many attorneys he trained, he was described as ethical, courteous, humble, honourable and of winning arguments by "nicing them to death".

He posthumously received the William H. Natcher Award for distinguished service to government, for his dedication to people, integrity and fair dealings.

== Death ==
Reynolds died unexpectedly on January 27, 1996, aged 71 at the medical center in Bowling Green, Kentucky. He was survived by his wife Mary, seven sons, four daughters and 22 grandchildren.

Political offices
Preceded by William Gant	Justice of the Kentucky Supreme Court; 1991–1996	Succeeded by Walter Arnold Baker
