= William S. Cooper (judge) =

Kentucky judge (born 1941)

Justice of the Kentucky Supreme Court
- In office November 25, 1996 – June 30, 2006
- Preceded by: Walter Arnold Baker
- Succeeded by: John D. Minton Jr.

Judge of the 9th Kentucky Circuit Court
- In office February 16, 1979 – November 25, 1996
- Preceded by: J. Howard Holbert
- Succeeded by: Thomas S. Bland

Personal details
- Born: September 15, 1941 (age 84) Elizabethtown, Kentucky, U.S.
- Education: University of Kentucky (BA, JD)

William S. Cooper (born September 15, 1941) is an American lawyer who served as a justice of the Kentucky Supreme Court from 1996 until his resignation in 2006. He previously served as a circuit judge from 1979 to 1996.

== Early life ==
Cooper was born on September 15, 1941, in Elizabethtown, Kentucky. He received a Bachelor of Arts from the University of Kentucky in 1963, followed by a Juris Doctor in 1970.

== Judicial career ==
Cooper was first appointed as a circuit judge on February 16, 1979, by governor Julian Carroll to fill a vacancy caused by the resignation of J. Howard Holbert. He was appointed to the 9th circuit, which comprises Hardin County.

Cooper was elected to the supreme court in a November 1996 special election, defeating incumbent justice Walter Arnold Baker, who had been appointed by governor Paul E. Patton. He was reelected to a full eight-year term in 1998. He retired from the court on June 30, 2006.
