= Martin E. Johnstone =

Kentucky judge (born 1949)

Justice of the Kentucky Supreme Court
- In office November 25, 1996 – June 30, 2006
- Preceded by: Nicholas King
- Succeeded by: William E. McAnulty Jr.

Judge of the Kentucky Court of Appeals
- In office May 5, 1993 – November 25, 1996
- Preceded by: John Hayes
- Succeeded by: Lisabeth Hughes Abramson

Judge of the 30th Kentucky Circuit Court
- In office January 2, 1984 – May 5, 1993
- Preceded by: Charles H. Anderson
- Succeeded by: William E. McAnulty Jr.

Judge of the 30th Kentucky District Court
- In office January 2, 1978 – January 2, 1984
- Preceded by: Court established
- Succeeded by: Henry F. Weber

Jefferson County Magistrate
- In office November 1976 – January 2, 1978
- Preceded by: Charles H. Anderson
- Succeeded by: Sammie Roland

Personal details
- Born: April 29, 1949 Louisville, Kentucky, U.S.
- Died: July 17, 2026 (aged 77) Prospect, Kentucky, U.S.
- Party: Democratic
- Education: Western Kentucky University (BA); University of Louisville (JD)

Martin Edward Johnstone (April 29, 1949 – July 17, 2026) was an American lawyer who served as a justice of the Kentucky Supreme Court from 1996 until his resignation in 2006. He previously served as a judge of the Kentucky Court of Appeals from 1993 to 1996, and as a trial judge at various levels from 1976 to 1993.

== Early life ==
Johnstone was born on April 29, 1949, in Louisville, Kentucky. He received a Bachelor of Arts from Western Kentucky University, followed by a Juris Doctor from the University of Louisville.

== Judicial career ==
Johnstone was first elected in a 1976 special election as a magistrate of Jefferson County, a position which at the time oversaw minor judicial matters such as civil cases involving disputes less than $500. Following an amendment to the state constitution, the position of magistrate was stripped of these duties, which were given to the newly created district courts. Johnstone was elected to the 30th District Court, comprising Jefferson County, in 1977 and 1981. He was elected to the 30th Circuit Court in 1983 and 1991.

Johnstone was appointed by governor Brereton Jones to the Kentucky Court of Appeals on May 5, 1993, following the resignation of judge John Hayes. The following November, he won a special election to fill the remainder of Hayes's term. In November 1996, Johnstone won a special election to the Kentucky Supreme Court, defeating incumbent justice Nicholas King, who had been appointed in the interim by governor Jones. He won reelection to a full eight-year term in 1998, before resigning from the court on June 30, 2006.

== Death ==
Johnstone died on July 17, 2026, at his home in Prospect.
