= Walter Arnold Baker =

American judge (1937–2010)

Walter Baker

Justice of the Kentucky Supreme Court
- In office April 15, 1996 – November 25, 1996
- Appointed by: Paul E. Patton
- Preceded by: Charles H. Reynolds
- Succeeded by: William Cooper

Member of the Kentucky Senate from the 9th district
- In office January 1, 1989 – April 15, 1996
- Preceded by: Joe Lane Travis
- Succeeded by: Richie Sanders
- In office January 1, 1972 – June 15, 1981
- Preceded by: J. C. Carter
- Succeeded by: Joe Lane Travis

Member of the Kentucky House of Representatives from the 23rd district
- In office January 1, 1968 – January 1, 1972
- Preceded by: Paul Allen
- Succeeded by: Bobby H. Richardson

Personal details
- Born: Walter Arnold Baker; February 20, 1937 Columbia, Kentucky
- Died: May 24, 2010 (aged 73) Glasgow, Kentucky
- Resting place: Glasgow Municipal Cemetery
- Party: Republican
- Spouse: Jane S. Helm
- Education: Harvard College; Harvard Law School
- Profession: Lawyer and politician
- Civilian awards: U.S. Department of Defense Outstanding Public Service Award

Military service
- Branch/service: Kentucky Air National Guard; U.S. Air Force Reserve
- Years of service: 1961–1981
- Rank: Lieutenant colonel
- Military awards: Meritorious Service Medal (twice)

Walter Arnold Baker (February 20, 1937 – May 24, 2010) was an American lawyer and politician who served in both houses of the Kentucky General Assembly, in the presidential administration of Ronald Reagan, and on the Kentucky Supreme Court. A graduate of Harvard Law School, Baker also served as a judge advocate general in the Kentucky Air National Guard for 20 years.

Baker's political career began with his election to the Kentucky House of Representatives in 1967, concurrent with the election of fellow Republican Louie B. Nunn as governor. Baker supported Nunn's efforts to raise the state sales tax to benefit education, the first of several education-related causes he would champion. In 1971, Baker was elected to the Kentucky Senate and was three times chosen as the Republican caucus chair. He resigned from the Senate in 1981 to take Reagan's appointment as assistant general counsel for International Affairs in the Department of Defense. He left that post in 1983 and was presented with the Department's Outstanding Public Service award. He narrowly lost a bid to return to his old Senate seat in 1983, but unseated the incumbent in 1988, spending the interim serving on the Prichard Committee for Academic Excellence and Kentucky Advocates for Higher Education. In his second stint in the Senate, his major accomplishment was helping to write the 1990 Kentucky Education Reform Act.

In 1996, Governor Paul E. Patton appointed Baker to fill a vacancy on the Kentucky Supreme Court occasioned by the death of Justice Charles H. Reynolds, but he served only a few months before losing a special election for the remainder of Reynolds' term. In 1997, Patton appointed Baker to the Kentucky Council on Postsecondary Education, a post he held until 2008. Baker died of cancer on May 24, 2010.

== Early life ==
Walter Arnold Baker was born February 20, 1937, to Herschell T. and Mattie (Barger) Baker in Columbia, Kentucky. His father, grandfather (Herschell Clay Baker), and great-grandfather were all legislators in the Kentucky General Assembly. At age 9, he met United States Senator John Sherman Cooper, who became one of his idols.

Growing up, Baker was friends with future Speaker of the Kentucky House of Representatives, Jody Richards. He obtained his early education at Lindsey Wilson Training School (now Lindsey Wilson University) in Columbia, before becoming part of the first graduating class at Adair County High School in 1954. He earned a scholarship to attend Harvard College, where he was a member of Phi Beta Kappa and a friend and classmate of future Supreme Court Justice Anthony Kennedy. He graduated magna cum laude with a Bachelor of Arts degree in history in 1958. He then attended Harvard Law School, earning a juris doctor in 1961.

Returning to Kentucky, Baker initially opened a law office in Louisville before moving to Glasgow in 1963. He also enlisted in the United States Air Force Reserve, and from 1961 to 1981, he was a judge advocate general in the Kentucky Air National Guard, attaining the rank of lieutenant colonel. He twice received the Meritorious Service Medal, in 1969 and 1981.

Baker married Jane S. Helm, and the couple had a son, Tom, and a daughter, Anne.

== Political career ==
In 1967, Baker was elected as a Republican to the Kentucky House of Representatives. As a legislator, he supported Governor Louie B. Nunn's campaign to increase the state sales tax from two percent to five percent, with the increased revenue going to fund education.

=== First tenure in the Kentucky Senate ===
In 1971, Baker was elected to the Kentucky Senate. On June 15, 1972, Baker was one of 11 Republican senators that voted against Kentucky's ratification of the Equal Rights Amendment. At the end of the legislative session, the Capitol Press Corps recognized him as its Outstanding Freshman Senator. In 1974, Baker was the lone vote against a Senate resolution honoring Martin Luther King Jr., explaining that he thought the Civil Rights Movement had pushed for too much too soon.

Baker received the Kentucky Council on Crime and Delinquency Outstanding Service Award in 1975. In 1976, he failed to unseat Congressman William H. Natcher, a popular Democratic incumbent, but by capturing 40% of the vote, he came as close as any candidate in the previous 20 years to defeating Natcher.

In 1976, 1978, and 1979, Baker was chair of the Senate's Republican caucus. He advocated a 1976 overhaul of the state judicial system proposed by Governor Julian Carroll. He was also the lone Republican to vote against a bill allowing public schools to post copies of the Ten Commandments in their classrooms; Baker explained that he thought the law was unconstitutional. In 1978, he was designated the most outstanding orator in the Kentucky Senate by the Capitol Press Corps.

=== Service in the Reagan administration and legislative interim ===
On June 15, 1981, Baker resigned his seat in the state senate to accept President Ronald Reagan's appointment as assistant general counsel for International Affairs in the Department of Defense. He held that position until 1983, and upon leaving the position, was presented the Department of Defense Outstanding Public Service Award.

On his return to Kentucky, Baker co-chaired Reagan's re-election campaign in Kentucky's 2nd congressional district. He was mentioned as a possible running mate for Jim Bunning in his 1983 gubernatorial campaign, but reportedly declined the offer. Instead, he challenged incumbent state senator Joe Lane Travis, who had won a special election to finish Baker's senate term, in the 1983 Republican primary election. During the campaign, Baker attacked Travis because he was not a lifelong Republican, while Travis countered that Baker had abandoned his constituents to take a position in the federal government. Baker lost the primary by 24 votes.

In August 1985, Baker was named to the Prichard Committee for Academic Excellence, and he was elected as the group's secretary in 1987. Baker was chosen secretary of the newly formed Kentucky Advocates for Higher Education in October 1985. He also considered running for lieutenant governor in 1987 on a ticket with Larry Forgy. After Forgy decided not to make the race for governor, Baker began to consider his own gubernatorial bid, but ultimately, he decided there was not enough time to mount a credible campaign and declined to run for any office in 1987.

=== Return to the state senate ===
Baker again challenged Joe Lane Travis for his senate seat in 1988. During the campaign, Baker complained that the Kentucky Republican Senatorial Committee gave $1,000 to Travis' campaign, saying the group's funds "should be used to support the Republican nominee and not used to favor one candidate over another in the Republican primary". Travis questioned why Baker, in his previous time as a legislator had never sponsored a major bill; Baker answered that he had worked to get members of the Democratic majority to sponsor or co-sponsor bills he favored in order to get them passed. Baker countered that Travis had been a "reflexive 'no' vote" in the Senate and that his support of proposals with little change of succeeding, such as a right-to-work law and shoring up the state workers' compensation system by moving Kentucky coal miners to the federal black lung disability system amounted to ideological grandstanding. Baker won the primary election by 112 votes and faced Democrat Larry Freas, the mayor of Franklin, in the general election.

Freas touted his successful 11-year tenure as mayor, during which he saved the city over $300,000 by turning many services over to private companies, constructed a new city hall as well as new water- and sewage-treatment plants, and reduced unemployment. Baker countered that Freas has also put several of his family members on the city's payroll, pleaded guilty to drunk driving in January 1986, and filed for bankruptcy in April 1987 following the failure of his restaurant business. Baker also said Freas had not been visible enough on the campaign trail. Baker carried all seven counties in the district and won the election by over 12,000 votes. Following the 1989 legislative session, Baker's was one of three names recommended to President George H. W. Bush by Senator Wendell H. Ford as potential replacements for Sixth Circuit Court of Appeals Judge Pierce Lively, who assumed senior status.

After the Kentucky Supreme Court declared Kentucky's entire public education system unconstitutional due to inequalities in funding for local districts, Senate President John "Eck" Rose appointed Baker as the only Republican legislator on the committee charged with creating a system that would meet the court's definition of constitutionality. John Rogers, the Republican floor leader in the Senate, objected that he was not consulted about Baker's appointment, that Republicans were underrepresented on the committee, and that Baker – despite his previous legislative service – was considered a freshman legislator. Baker said he believed more Republicans would be appointed to the committee when he agreed to serve. The committee presented the Kentucky Education Reform Act to the legislature in 1990, and Baker was one of only three Republicans who voted for it. Baker was awarded the Louisville-Jefferson County Crime Commission Legislator of the Year Award in both 1990 and 1992. He was unopposed for re-election in 1992.

In 1990, Baker reversed an earlier position, joining Gerald Neal, the only African-American member of the Senate, in advocating for a bill to make Martin Luther King, Jr. Day a state holiday. Baker apologized for his earlier stand against the Senate honoring King, saying simply, "I was wrong." A Lexington Herald-Leader columnist wrote of Baker's speech, in which he recounted that his family had owned slaves until his great-grandfather freed them in the 1820s, that it "set such a high moral tone for the Senate that no one else spoke – and no one voted against the King holiday."

Baker represented the National Conference of State Legislatures on trips to China, Japan, and the Soviet Union. In 1995, at the request of the United States Information Agency, he advised the parliaments of Tomsk and Nizhny Novgorod on writing constitutions. Later that year, he received the William H. Natcher Award for Outstanding Public Service from the Barren River Area Development District. He served in the Senate until 1996.

=== Kentucky Supreme Court ===
State Representative Richie Sanders announced he would challenge Baker for his Senate seat in 1996 after legislative redistricting made it unlikely he could win re-election to his seat in the House. On April 8, 1996, Democratic Governor Paul E. Patton announced his appointment of Baker to the Kentucky Supreme Court, replacing Justice Charles H. Reynolds, who died in January. Baker's appointment left Democrat Jake Dickinson as the perceived favorite to defeat Sanders and win Baker's seat in the Senate. Baker resigned his seat in the Senate on April 15, the final day of the legislative session, and was sworn in as a justice an hour later.

Four men, including Baker, announced their candidacy for the November special election to fill the remainder of Reynolds' term. The other candidates included Kentucky Court of Appeals Justices John Miller and Joseph Huddleston and William Cooper. Baker finished third in the special election with 30,278 votes; Cooper won the seat, garnering 33,670 votes to Huddleston's 32,137 and Miller's 26,592. Each candidate won by a large margin in his home county, but Baker, from Barren County, cut into Huddleston's margin in neighboring Warren County, while low overall voter turnout in Daviess County hurt Miller. During the campaign, fellow justice Joseph Lambert told Baker that he spent too much time writing opinions and not enough time campaigning.

== Later life ==
Following his tenure on the court, Baker re-opened his law practice in Glasgow. He was invited to address an economic conference in Poland in 1997. Later that year, Governor Patton appointed him to fill an unexpired term on the Kentucky Council on Postsecondary Education. In 1998, he again challenged Cooper for his seat on the Kentucky Supreme Court but captured only about 40% of the vote.

Baker sat on the board of the Kentucky Historical Society and served one term as its president. He received the John Sherman Cooper Award for Outstanding Public Service from Eastern Kentucky University in 2001, and in 2003, he received the Vic Hellard Jr. Award for Public Service from the Kentucky Long-Term Policy Research Center. In 2006, Pikeville College (now the University of Pikeville) honored Baker with an honorary Doctor of Humane Letters degree.

Formerly a Presbyterian, Baker began attending Glasgow's St. Andrews Episcopal Church in 2003 and became an Episcopalian in 2005. He was elected vice-chancellor of the Protestant Episcopal Diocese of Kentucky later that year, serving until his death. In this capacity, he provided legal counsel for the diocese, primarily in financial and real estate matters.

Governor Patton reappointed Baker to the Council on Postsecondary Education in 2001 and Democratic Governor Steve Beshear appointed him again on December 28, 2007. The appointment was not confirmed by the Kentucky General Assembly, however, which cited a statute requiring the council's makeup of Democrats and Republicans to reflect the parties' proportion of voter registrations. Baker's appointment would have created an over-representation of Republicans on the council. Further, Council members were limited by statute to two terms, although Beshear said his understanding was that partial terms would not count against the limit. Because of these issues, Baker resigned from the Council on February 26, 2008, saying "I hope it doesn't conclude my public service, but it severs all connection to state government at the present." During the 2008 presidential election, he was a presidential elector for Republican candidate John McCain.

Baker died of cancer at his home in Glasgow on May 24, 2010. He was inurned at the Glasgow Municipal Cemetery. Baker left his personal library to Lindsey Wilson University.
