= Thomas B. Spain =

American judge (1928–2013)

Justice of the Kentucky Supreme Court
- In office January 7, 1991 – June 30, 1995
- Preceded by: Roy N. Vance
- Succeeded by: William Fuqua

Judge of the 4th Kentucky Circuit Court
- In office June 29, 1973 – January 7, 1991
- Preceded by: Clifton J. Waddill
- Succeeded by: Charles W. Boteler

Personal details
- Born: November 5, 1928
- Died: December 7, 2013 (aged 85) Hanson, Kentucky
- Education: Western Kentucky University; University of Kentucky College of Law
- Profession: Attorney

Military service
- Branch/service: United States Army
- Years of service: 1951 – 1955
- Battles/wars: Korean War

Thomas B. Spain (November 5, 1928 – December 7, 2013) was a justice of the Kentucky Supreme Court from 1991 to 1995.

Spain attended Western Kentucky University and the University of Kentucky College of Law. After graduating from law school in 1951, he joined the army in the Korean War and became a major. Spain was an Army judge advocate in the 1950s and began practicing law in 1955 in Madisonville, Kentucky. He was a young attorney working for Gordon and Mills law firm. Governor Wendell Ford appointed Spain to the state circuit court on June 29, 1973. He served as circuit court judge in Hopkins and Caldwell counties for 17 years before joining the high court in 1991.

After retiring from the Supreme Court in 1995, Spain joined John C. Whitfield's law firm. Spain died on December 7, 2013, at the Western Kentucky Veterans Center in Hanson, Kentucky.
