= Government of Kentucky =

State government of Kentucky

Government of the Commonwealth of Kentucky
- Seal of the Commonwealth of Kentucky
- Part of: United States of America
- Constitution: Constitution of Kentucky

Legislative branch
- Name: General Assembly
- Type: Bicameral
- Meeting place: Kentucky State Capitol
- Upper house
- Name: Senate
- Presiding officer: Robert Stivers, President
- Lower house
- Name: House of Representatives
- Presiding officer: David Osborne, Speaker

Executive branch
- Head of state and government
- Title: Governor
- Currently: Andy Beshear
- Appointer: Election
- Cabinet
- Leader: Governor
- Deputy leader: Lieutenant Governor
- Headquarters: Kentucky State Capitol

Judicial branch
- Courts: Courts of Kentucky
- Kentucky Supreme Court
- Chief judge: Debra H. Lambert
- Seat: Frankfort, Kentucky

As established and defined by the Kentucky Constitution, the government of the Commonwealth of Kentucky is composed of three branches: the Executive, Judicial, and Legislative.

== Executive branch ==
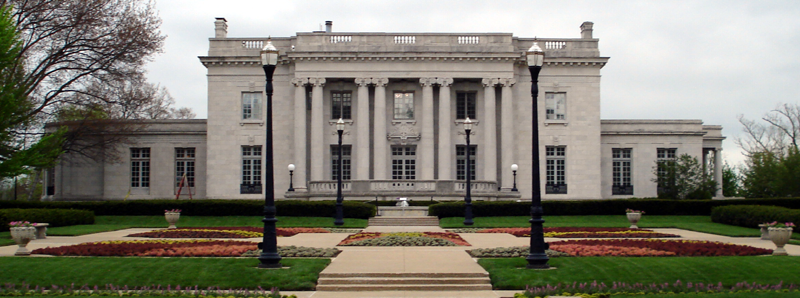
The governor's mansion in Frankfort

The executive branch is headed by the governor, who serves as both the head of state and government. The lieutenant governor does not hold execute authority, though one can if he/she is also a member of the cabinet. Under the current Kentucky Constitution, the lieutenant governor assumes the duties of the governor only if the governor is incapacitated and cannot perform the duties of the office. Before 1992, the lieutenant governor took to power any time the governor was out of the state. The governor and lieutenant governor usually run on a single ticket, as per a 1992 constitutional amendment, and are elected to four-year terms. The current governor is Andy Beshear, and the lieutenant governor is Jacqueline Coleman, both of whom are Democrats.

The executive branch is organized into the following "cabinets", each headed by a secretary who is also a member of the governor's cabinet:

- General Government Cabinet
- Transportation Cabinet
- Cabinet for Economic Development
- Finance and Administration Cabinet
- Tourism, Arts, and Heritage Cabinet
- Education and Workforce Development Cabinet
- Cabinet for Health and Family Services
- Justice and Public Safety Cabinet
- Personnel Cabinet
- Labor Cabinet
- Energy and Environment Cabinet
- Public Protection Cabinet

The cabinet system was introduced in 1972 by Governor Wendell Ford to consolidate hundreds of government entities that reported directly to the governor's office.

Other elected offices in the Kentucky Constitution include the Secretary of State, Attorney General, Auditor of Public Accounts, State Treasurer, and Commissioner of Agriculture. Currently, Republican Michael G. Adams serves as the Secretary of State. The commonwealth's chief prosecutor, law enforcement officer, and law officer, is the Attorney General, currently Republican Russell Coleman. The Auditor of Public Accounts is Republican Allison Ball. Republican Mark Metcalf is the current Treasurer. Republican Jonathan Shell is the current Commissioner of Agriculture.

== Legislative branch ==
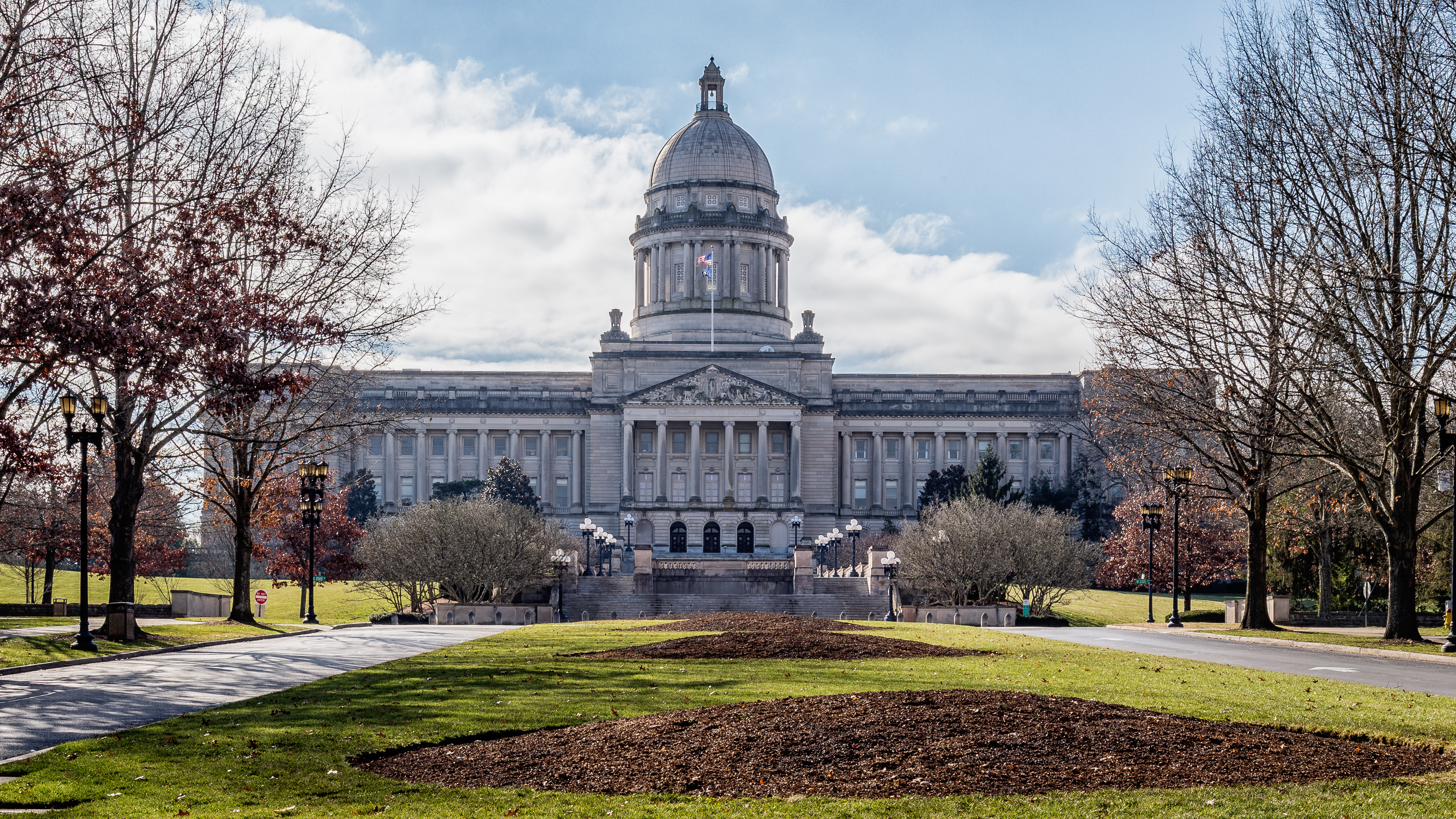
The Kentucky State Capitol building in Frankfort

Kentucky's legislative branch consists of a bicameral body known as the Kentucky General Assembly.

The Senate is considered the upper house of the General Assembly; it has 38 members and is led by the President of the Senate, currently Robert Stivers (R).

The House of Representatives has 100 members, and is led by the Speaker of the House - currently David Osborne of the Republican Party.

In November 2016, Republicans won control of the house for the first time since 1922, and they currently have supermajorities in both the House and Senate.

== Judicial branch ==
The judicial branch of Kentucky is called the Kentucky Court of Justice and comprises courts of limited jurisdiction called District Courts; courts of general jurisdiction called Circuit Courts; specialty courts such as Drug Court and Family Court; an intermediate appellate court, the Kentucky Court of Appeals; and a court of last resort, the Kentucky Supreme Court.

The Kentucky Court of Justice is headed by the Chief Justice of the Commonwealth. The chief justice is appointed by and is an elected member of the Supreme Court of Kentucky. The current chief justice is Debre H. Lambert, the commonwealth's first woman to serve in the position.

Unlike federal judges, who are usually appointed, justices serving on Kentucky state courts are chosen by the electorate in non-partisan elections.

== Federal representation ==
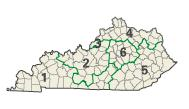
A map showing Kentucky's six congressional districts

Kentucky's two U.S. senators are Senate Minority Leader Mitch McConnell and Rand Paul, both Republicans. The state is divided into six congressional districts, represented by Republicans James Comer (1st), Brett Guthrie (2nd), Thomas Massie (4th), Hal Rogers (5th), and Andy Barr (6th), and Democrat Morgan McGarvey (3rd).

In the federal judiciary, Kentucky is served by two United States district courts: the Eastern District of Kentucky, with its primary seat in Lexington, and the Western District of Kentucky, with its primary seat in Louisville. Appeals are heard in the Court of Appeals for the Sixth Circuit, based in Cincinnati, Ohio.

== Law ==
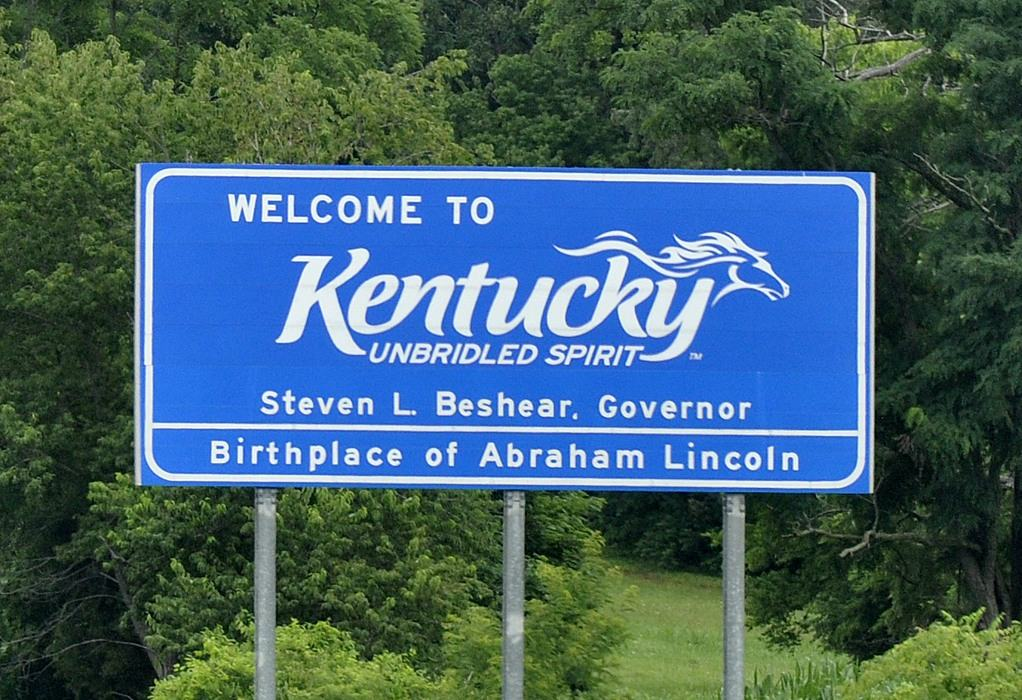
State sign, Interstate 65

Kentucky's body of laws, known as the Kentucky Revised Statutes (KRS), was enacted in 1942 to better organize and clarify the whole of Kentucky law. The statutes are enforced by local police, sheriffs and deputy sheriffs, and constables and deputy constables. Unless they have completed a police academy elsewhere, these officers must complete Police Officer Professional Standards (POPS) training at the Kentucky Department of Criminal Justice Training Center on the campus of Eastern Kentucky University in Richmond. In 1948, the Kentucky General Assembly established the Kentucky State Police, making it the 38th state to create a force whose jurisdiction extends throughout the given state.

Kentucky is one of the 32 states in the United States that sanctions the death penalty for certain murders defined as heinous. Those convicted of capital crimes after March 31, 1998, are always executed by lethal injection; those convicted on or before this date may opt for the electric chair. Only three people have been executed in Kentucky since the U.S. Supreme Court re-instituted the practice in 1976. The most notable execution in Kentucky was that of Rainey Bethea on August 14, 1936. Bethea was publicly hanged in Owensboro for the rape and murder of Lischia Edwards. Irregularities with the execution led to this becoming the last public execution in the United States.

Kentucky has been on the front lines of the debate over displaying the Ten Commandments on public property. In the 2005 case of McCreary County v. ACLU of Kentucky, the U.S. Supreme Court upheld the decision of the Sixth Circuit Court of Appeals that a display of the Ten Commandments in the Whitley City courthouse of McCreary County was unconstitutional. Later that year, Judge Richard Fred Suhrheinrich, writing for the Sixth Circuit Court of Appeals in the case of ACLU of Kentucky v. Mercer County, wrote that a display including the Mayflower Compact, the Declaration of Independence, the Ten Commandments, Magna Carta, The Star-Spangled Banner, and the national motto could be erected in the Mercer County courthouse.

Kentucky has also been known to have unusually high political candidacy age laws, especially compared to surrounding states. The origin of this is unknown, but it has been suggested it has to do with the commonwealth tradition.

A 2008 study found Kentucky's Supreme Court to be the least influential high court in the nation, with its decisions rarely being followed by other states.

== Politics ==
Presidential elections results
Year	Republican	Democratic
2024	64.40% 1,337,494	33.90% 704,043
2020	62.09% 1,326,646	36.15% 772,474
2016	62.54% 1,202,942	32.69% 628,834
2012	60.49% 1,087,190	37.80% 679,370
2008	57.37% 1,048,462	41.15% 751,985
2004	59.55% 1,069,439	39.69% 712,733
2000	56.50% 872,492	41.37% 638,898
1996	44.88% 623,283	45.84% 636,614
1992	41.34% 617,178	44.55% 665,104
1988	55.52% 734,281	43.88% 580,368
1984	60.04% 822,782	39.37% 539,589
1980	49.07% 635,274	47.61% 616,417
1976	45.57% 531,852	52.75% 615,717
1972	63.37% 676,446	34.77% 371,159
1968	43.79% 462,411	37.65% 397,541
1964	35.65% 372,977	64.01% 669,659
1960	53.59% 602,607	46.41% 521,855

Treemap of the popular vote by county, 2016 presidential election

Politics in Kentucky has historically been very competitive. The state leaned toward the Democratic Party during the 1860s after the Whig Party dissolved. During the Civil War, the southeastern part of the state aligned with the Union and tended to support Republican candidates thereafter, while the central and western portions remained heavily Democratic even into the following decades. Kentucky would be part of the Democratic Solid South until the mid-20th century.

Since 1952, voters in the Commonwealth supported the three Democratic candidates elected to the White House, all from Southern states: Lyndon B. Johnson from Texas in 1964, Jimmy Carter from Georgia in 1976, and Bill Clinton from Arkansas in 1992 and 1996. But by the 21st century, the state had become a Republican stronghold in federal elections, supporting that party's presidential candidates by double-digit margins since 2000. At the same time, voters have continued to elect Democratic candidates to state and local offices in many jurisdictions. Mirroring the broader national partisan realignment, Kentucky's Democratic Party in the 21st century primarily consists of liberal whites, African-Americans, and other racial minorities. As of March 2020, 48.42 percent of the state's voters were officially registered as Democrats, while 42.75 percent were registered Republicans, whose members tend to be conservative whites. Some 8.83 percent were registered with another political party or as Independents. Despite the Democratic voter registration advantage, the state has elected Republican candidates for federal office routinely since the beginning of the 21st century.

From 1964 through 2004, Kentucky voted for the eventual winner of the Presidential election each time, until losing its bellwether status in the 2008 election. That year Republican John McCain won Kentucky, carrying it 57 percent to 41 percent, but lost the national popular and electoral votes to Democrat Barack Obama. Further hampering Kentucky's status as a bellwether state, 116 of Kentucky's 120 counties supported Republican Mitt Romney in the 2012 election, who lost to Barack Obama nationwide.

In a 2020 study, Kentucky was ranked as the 8th hardest state for citizens to vote in.

Voter registration and party enrollment as of June 2025
Party	Number of voters	Percentage
Republican	1,582,699	47.45%
Democratic	1,391,172	41.71%
Other	176,852	5.30%
Independent	163,979	4.91%
Total	3,559,653	100.00%
