= 2022 Kentucky elections =

A general election was held in the U.S. state of Kentucky on November 8, 2022. The primary election for all offices was held on May 17, 2022.

== Federal offices ==
=== United States Senate ===
Incumbent senator Rand Paul won reelection, defeating Democratic challenger Charles Booker.

=== United States House of Representatives ===
Kentucky has six congressional districts, electing five Republicans and one Democrat.

== State offices ==
=== Kentucky Senate ===
The Kentucky Senate consists of 38 members. In 2022, half of the chamber (all even-numbered districts) was up for election. Republicans maintained their majority, picking up one seat.

=== Kentucky House of Representatives ===
All 100 seats in the Kentucky House of Representatives were up for election in 2022. Republicans maintained their majority, picking up five seats.

=== Kentucky Supreme Court ===
2022 Kentucky Supreme Court elections
- November 8, 2022

4 of the 7 districts of the Kentucky Supreme Court

The Kentucky Supreme Court consists of 7 justices elected in non-partisan elections to staggered eight-year terms. Districts 1, 2, 4, and 6 were up for election in 2022.

==== District 1 ====
2022 Kentucky Supreme Court 1st district election
- District 1
Candidate	Christopher Shea Nickell
Popular vote	115,659
Percentage	100.0%
Justice before election
Christopher Shea Nickell
Elected Justice
Christopher Shea Nickell

2022 Kentucky Supreme Court 1st district election
Candidate	Votes	%
Christopher Shea Nickell (incumbent)	Unopposed	
Total votes	115,659	100.0

==== District 2 ====
2022 Kentucky Supreme Court 2nd district election
- District 2
Candidate	Kelly Thompson	Shawn Alcott
Popular vote	81,761	49,119
Percentage	62.47%	37.53%
- County results Thompson: 50–60% 60–70% 70–80%
Justice before election
John D. Minton Jr.
Elected Justice
Kelly Thompson

2022 Kentucky Supreme Court 2nd district election
Candidate	Votes	%
Kelly Thompson	81,761	62.47
Shawn Alcott	49,119	37.53
Total votes	130,880	100.0

==== District 4 ====
2022 Kentucky Supreme Court 4th district election
- District 4
Candidate	Angela McCormick Bisig	Jason Bowman
Popular vote	174,328	42,645
Percentage	80.35%	19.65%
Justice before election
Lisabeth Tabor Hughes
Elected Justice
Angela McCormick Bisig

2022 Kentucky Supreme Court 4th district election
Candidate	Votes	%
Angela McCormick Bisig	174,328	80.35
Jason Bowman	42,645	19.65
Total votes	216,973	100.0

==== District 6 ====
2022 Kentucky Supreme Court 6th district election
- District 6
Candidate	Michelle M. Keller	Joseph Fischer
Popular vote	87,292	71,911
Percentage	54.83%	45.17%
- Keller: 50–60% 60–70% 70–80% 80–90% Fischer: 50–60% 60–70% Tie: 50%
Justice before election
Michelle M. Keller
Elected Justice
Michelle M. Keller

2022 Kentucky Supreme Court 6th district election
Candidate	Votes	%
Michelle M. Keller (incumbent)	87,292	54.83
Joseph Fischer	71,911	45.17
Total votes	159,203	100.0

=== Other judicial elections ===
All judges of the Kentucky Court of Appeals and the Kentucky Circuit Courts were elected in non-partisan elections to eight-year terms. All judges of the Kentucky District Courts were elected in non-partisan elections to four-year terms.

== Local offices ==
=== County officers ===
All county officials were elected in partisan elections to four-year terms. The offices include the County Judge/Executive, the Fiscal Court (Magistrates and/or Commissioners), County Clerk, County Attorney, Jailer, Coroner, Surveyor, Property Value Administrator, Constables, and Sheriff.

=== Mayors ===
Mayors in Kentucky are elected to four-year terms, with cities holding their elections in either presidential or midterm years. Cities with elections in 2022 include those in Louisville and in Lexington.

=== City councils ===
Each incorporated city elected its council members to a two-year term.

=== School boards ===
Local school board members are elected to staggered four-year terms, with half up for election in 2022.

=== Louisville Metro Council ===
The Louisville Metro Council is elected to staggered four-year terms, with odd-numbered districts up for election in 2022.

== Ballot measures ==
=== Amendment 1 ===
Amendment 1
- November 8, 2022
- Changes to Legislative Session End Dates and Special Sessions Measure

Results
Choice	Votes	%
Yes	602,226	46.45%
No	694,311	53.55%
Total votes	1,296,537	100.00%

No
70–80%
60–70%
50–60%
Yes
60–70%
50–60%

==== Text ====
Are you in favor of amending the present Constitution of Kentucky to repeal sections 36, 42, and 55 and replace those sections with new sections of the Constitution of Kentucky to allow the General Assembly to meet in regular session for thirty legislative days in odd-numbered years, for sixty legislative days in even-numbered years, and for no more than twelve additional days during any calendar year if convened by a Joint Proclamation of the President of the Senate and the Speaker of the House of Representatives, with no session of the General Assembly to extend beyond December 31; and to provide that any act passed by the General Assembly shall become law on July 1 of the year in which it was passed, or ninety days after passage and signature of the Governor, whichever occurs later, or in cases of emergency when approved by the Governor or when it otherwise becomes law under Section 88 of the Constitution?

Proposed New Section

(1) The General Assembly, in odd-numbered years, shall convene in regular session on the first Tuesday following the first Monday in January for the purpose of electing legislative leaders, adopting rules of procedure, organizing committees, and introducing and considering legislation.

(2) No regular session of the General Assembly occurring in odd-numbered years shall continue beyond thirty legislative days.

(3) No bill raising revenue or appropriating funds shall be passed by the General Assembly in a regular session in an odd-numbered year unless it shall be agreed upon by three-fifths of all the members elected to each House.

(4) The General Assembly, in even-numbered years, shall convene in regular session on the first Tuesday following the first Monday in January, and no regular session of the General Assembly in even numbered years shall extend beyond sixty legislative days.

(5) Except as otherwise provided in this Constitution, the General Assembly shall establish by general law or joint resolution the date the regular session shall end. No bill establishing a later date shall be passed by the General Assembly unless it shall be agreed upon by three-fifths of all the members elected to each House. No session of the General Assembly shall extend beyond December 31.

(6) In addition to a regular session, the General Assembly may be convened by Joint Proclamation of the President of the Senate and the Speaker of the House of Representatives for no more than twelve legislative days annually, during which the General Assembly may recess from time to time as it determines necessary. Should a vacancy occur in the office of the President of the Senate or the Speaker of the House of Representatives, the Joint Proclamation for the House with the vacancy may be issued by the Senate President Pro Tempore or the Speaker Pro Tempore of the House of Representatives.

(7) All sessions of the General Assembly shall be held at the seat of government, except in the case of war, insurrection, or pestilence, when it may, by Joint Proclamation of the President of the Senate and the Speaker of the House of Representatives, assemble, for the time being, elsewhere. Should a vacancy occur in the office of the President of the Senate or the Speaker of the House of Representatives, the Joint Proclamation for the House with the vacancy may be issued by the Senate President Pro Tempore or the Speaker Pro Tempore of the House of Representatives.

(8) Limitations as to the length of any session of the General Assembly shall not apply to any extraordinary session under Section 80 of this Constitution or in the Senate when sitting as a court of impeachment.

(9) A legislative day shall be construed to mean a calendar day, exclusive of Sundays, legal holidays, or any day on which neither House meets.

Proposed New Section

No act, except general appropriation bills, shall become a law until July 1 of the year in which it was passed, or until ninety days after it becomes law under Section 88 of this Constitution, whichever occurs later, except in cases of emergency, when, by the concurrence of a majority of the members elected to each House of the General Assembly, by a yea and nay vote entered upon their journals, an act may become a law when approved by the Governor or when it otherwise becomes a law under Section 88; but the reasons for the emergency that justifies this action must be set out at length in the journal of each House.

==== Results ====
The amendment was designed to remove specific legislative session end dates from the constitution and provide instead that odd-year sessions are limited to 30 legislative days and even-year sessions are limited to 60 legislative days.

Amendment 1
Choice	Votes	%
For	602,226	46.45
Against	694,311	53.55
Total	1,296,537	100.00

=== Amendment 2 ===
Results by county: No: 50–60%; 60–70%; 70–80%; Yes: 50–60%; 60–70%; 70–80%; 80–90%

Amendment 2
Choice	Votes	%
For	675,634	47.65
Against	742,232	52.35
Total	1,417,866	100.00

== See also ==
- Elections in Kentucky
- Politics of Kentucky
- Political party strength in Kentucky
