= Jefferson County Circuit Court =

County Circuit Court in Kentucky

- Jurisdiction: Kentucky; Jefferson County
- Location: Jefferson County, Kentucky
- Composition method: Non-partisan election
- Appeals to: Kentucky Court of Appeals
- Website: https://www.jeffersoncircuitcourt.com/

Chief Judge
- Currently: Angela McCormick Bisig

Clerk of Court
- Currently: David L. Nicholson

The Jefferson County Circuit Court is the Kentucky Circuit Court with jurisdiction over Jefferson County Kentucky, which includes the city of Louisville, Kentucky. It is the largest single unified trial court in Kentucky.

== History ==
The Kentucky Circuit Court with jurisdiction over Jefferson County, Kentucky, includes the city of Louisville, Kentucky. In 1991, the Family Court was established as a separate division of the Jefferson County Circuit Court, and is tasked with handling all family law matters.

On January 1, 2021, Kentucky's first Business Court Docket was launched in Jefferson County Circuit providing a specialized forum for complex commercial cases.

== Courthouses ==
- Jefferson County Judicial Center, Louisville

== Administration ==
The Jefferson County Circuit Court has 13 separate divisions, with separate judges presiding over each division. Circuit Court judges serve terms of eight years. As of 2021, the Chief Judge was Angela McCormick Bisig. David L. Nicholson is the Circuit Court Clerk.

== Officers ==
There are several officers of the court, including judges, jurors, mediators, master commissioners, prosecutors, defense attorneys, clerks and bailiffs.

=== Jurors ===
- Minimum requirements: 18 years or older, citizen of the United States, resident of Jefferson County, Kentucky, able to speak and understand English, not be convicted of a felony (unless pardoned or had rights restored), not be currently under indictment and not have served on a jury within the past 24 months.

=== Judges ===
The Kentucky Court of Justice maintains an official roster of all circuit court judges, including the 13 judges of the Jefferson County Circuit Court. Notable judges have included:

- Irv Maze
- Henry Luesing Brooks
- Lisabeth Tabor Hughes
- Boyce F. Martin Jr.
- William E. McAnulty Jr.

=== Master Commissioners ===
The master commissioner is a subordinate judicial officer elected by the judges of the court and granted limited power to hear and make decisions in certain types of legal matters, similar to a United States magistrate judge. The function of the master commissioner is to assist the Jefferson County Circuit Court in the discharge of its duties and the enforcement of its judgments, including conducting sales of property to satisfy liens, mortgages, or claims of ownership. Currently, the Master Commissioner is Carole C. Schneider.

=== Prosecutors ===
The Jefferson County Commonwealth's Attorney (referred to in most states as the District Attorney), Thomas B. Wine, prosecutes crimes before the court on behalf of Kentucky. The mission statement of the Jefferson County Commonwealth's Attorney is "to promote public safety through the ethical, fair and just prosecution of criminal offenses; to advocate for justice for the victims of crimes; to safeguard the rule of law; to promote citizens’ confidence in the criminal justice system by treating all persons with fairness, dignity and respect, and to collaborate with all members of the criminal justice system to ensure the rights of all persons are respected."

=== Defense attorneys ===
The functions of the Louisville Metro Public Defender's Office are contracted to the Louisville and Jefferson County Public Defender Corporation, a 503(c)(3) non-profit organization. Daniel T. Goyotte served as the Chief Public Defender from 1982 to 2018. Currently, the Chief Public Defender of the Louisville Metro Public Defender's Office is Leo G. Smith.

=== Clerks ===
The Jefferson County Office of the Circuit Court Clerk is responsible for managing the courtrooms and other clerical courtroom activities, including serving as the custodian of all court records as maintaining the repository of fees, fines and court costs in the Jefferson County Circuit Court . The current Circuit Court Clerk is David L. Nicholson.

=== Bailiffs ===
The functions of the bailiff are contracted to the Jefferson County Sheriff's Office, which is currently headed by Col. John Aubrey, Sheriff.

== Notable cases ==
- Batson v. Kentucky
- Killing of Breonna Taylor
- Shooting of David McAtee
