= 1986 Kentucky elections =

A general election was held in the U.S. state of Kentucky on November 4, 1986. The primary election for all offices was held on May 27, 1986.

== Federal offices ==
=== United States Senate ===
Incumbent senator Wendell Ford won reelection, defeating Republican challenger Jackson Andrews.

=== United States House of Representatives ===
In 1986, Kentucky had seven congressional districts, electing four Democrats and three Republicans.

== State offices ==
=== Kentucky Senate ===
The Kentucky Senate consists of 38 members. In 1986, half of the chamber (all even-numbered districts) was up for election. Democrats maintained their majority, gaining one seat.

=== Kentucky House of Representatives ===
Results by district

All 100 seats in the Kentucky House of Representatives were up for election in 1986. Democrats maintained their majority, losing one seat.

=== Kentucky Supreme Court ===
1986 Kentucky Supreme Court 3rd district election
- November 4, 1986
- District 3
Candidate	Joseph Lambert	Charles R. Luker
Popular vote	38,093	26,606
Percentage	58.88%	41.12%
- County results Lambert: 50–60% 60–70% 70–80% 80–90% Luker: 50–60% 60–70% 80–90%
Justice before election
John D. White
Elected Justice
Joseph Lambert

The Kentucky Supreme Court consists of seven justices elected in non-partisan elections to staggered eight-year terms. District 3 was up for election in 1986.

==== District 3 ====
1986 Kentucky Supreme Court 3rd district election
Candidate	Votes	%
Joseph Lambert	38,093	58.88
Charles R. Luker	26,606	41.12
Total votes	64,699	100.0

== Local offices ==
=== School boards ===
Local school board members are elected to staggered four-year terms, with half up for election in 1986.

== Ballot measures ==
=== Amendment 1 ===
==== Text ====
Shall sections 91, 93, 95 and 183 of the Constitution be amended so as to (1) abolish the elective office of superintendent of public instruction; (2) provide for a state board of education appointed by the governor with senate approval, consisting of 13 members serving six year terms, who are eligible to serve no more than two consecutive terms, the original appointees serving staggered terms beginning July 1, 1987, three appointees for six year terms, two for five year terms, two for four year terms, two for three year terms, two for two year terms, at the designation of the governor, with qualifications and duties prescribed by statute; (3) provide that one appointment be made from each of the seven supreme court districts and six appointments from at large; (4) provide that the state board of education appoint by contract a superintendent of public instruction for a maximum term of five years who may serve consecutively contractual periods subject to removal for cause as prescribed by law, with duties and qualifications fixed by the board or statute, and with salary and allowance fixed by the board; (5) provide that the state board of education taking office July 1, 1987 appoint an acting superintendent of public instruction to take office the first Monday in January, 1988; and (6) provide a schedule of transition for the superintendent of public instruction and members of the state board of education in office at the time this amendment is ratified?

==== Results ====
Results by county: No: 50–60%; 60–70%; 70–80%; 80–90%; Yes: 50–60%; 60–70%

Amendment 1
Choice	Votes	%
For	228,909	42.72
Against	306,905	57.28
Total	535,814	100.00

=== Amendment 2 ===
==== Text ====
Shall Section 160 of the Constitution be amended to allow mayors of cities of the first and second classes to serve two successive terms beyond their original terms?

==== Results ====
Results by county: Yes: 50–60%; 60–70%; 70–80%; No: 50–60%; 60–70%; 70–80%

Amendment 2
Choice	Votes	%
For	297,883	57.61
Against	219,201	42.39
Total	517,084	100.00

== See also ==
- Elections in Kentucky
- Politics of Kentucky
- Political party strength in Kentucky
