= 2010 Kentucky elections =

Elections were held in Kentucky on Tuesday, November 2, 2010. Primary elections were held on May 18, 2010.

== Federal ==
=== United States Senate ===
The nominees are Kentucky Attorney General Jack Conway (Democratic Party) and Rand Paul (Republican Party).

=== United States House ===
All six Kentucky seats in the United States House of Representatives are up for election in 2010.

== State ==
=== Senate ===
All of the seats of the Kentucky Senate are up for election in 2010.

=== House of Representatives ===
Results by district

All of the seats in the Kentucky House of Representatives are up for election in 2010.

=== Kentucky Supreme Court ===
2010 Kentucky Supreme Court 3rd district election
- November 2, 2010
- District 3
Candidate	Daniel J. Venters
Popular vote	100,651
Percentage	100.0%
Justice before election
Daniel J. Venters
Elected Justice
Daniel J. Venters

The Kentucky Supreme Court consists of seven justices elected in non-partisan elections to staggered eight-year terms. Districts 3 was up for election in 2010.

==== District 3 ====
2010 Kentucky Supreme Court 3rd district election
Candidate	Votes	%
Daniel J. Venters (incumbent)	Unopposed	
Total votes	100,651	100.0

=== Other judicial elections ===
All judges of the Kentucky District Courts were elected in non-partisan elections to four-year terms.

== Local offices ==
=== County officers ===
All county officials were elected in partisan elections to four-year terms. The offices include the County Judge/Executive, the Fiscal Court (Magistrates and/or Commissioners), County Clerk, County Attorney, Jailer, Coroner, Surveyor, Property Value Administrator, Constables, and Sheriff.

=== Mayors ===
Mayors in Kentucky are elected to four-year terms, with cities holding their elections in either presidential or midterm years. Cities with elections in 2010 include those in Louisville and in Lexington.

=== City councils ===
Each incorporated city elected its council members to a two-year term.

=== School boards ===
Local school board members are elected to staggered four-year terms, with half up for election in 2010.

=== Louisville Metro Council ===
The Louisville Metro Council is elected to staggered four-year terms, with odd-numbered districts up for election in 2010.
