= Pleas Jones =

American judge (1912–1986)

Justice of the Kentucky Supreme Court
- In office January 1, 1976 – January 1, 1979
- Preceded by: Court established
- Succeeded by: J. Calvin Aker

Justice of the Kentucky Court of Appeals
- In office August 3, 1973 – December 31, 1975
- Preceded by: Homer Neikirk
- Succeeded by: Court became Supreme Court

Circuit Judge for Kentucky's 34th district
- In office 1963–1973

Commonwealth's attorney for Kentucky's 34th district
- In office 1959–1963

County judge for Whitley County, Kentucky
- In office 1953–1957

Personal details
- Born: Pleas E. Jones; December 23, 1912 Whitley County, Kentucky
- Died: September 19, 1986 (aged 73) Williamsburg, Kentucky
- Party: Republican
- Spouse: Marie
- Children: 2
- Education: University of Kentucky College of Law
- Profession: Lawyer, judge

Military service
- Allegiance: United States
- Branch/service: U.S. Army
- Battles/wars: World War II

Pleas E. Jones (December 23, 1912 – September 20, 1986) was an American lawyer and jurist from Kentucky. A native of Whitley County, Kentucky, Jones was a schoolteacher before he served in the U.S. Army during World War II. After returning to the United States, Jones earned his J.D. degree at the University of Kentucky College of Law. Jones was a county judge and a Commonwealth's attorney before being elected a circuit judge. In 1973, Jones was appointed an justice of the Kentucky Court of Appeals—then the state's highest court. He served on that court (subsequently renamed the Kentucky Supreme Court) until his retirement in 1979. He died seven years later.

== Early life and family ==
Pleas Jones was born on a farm in Whitley County, Kentucky, on December 23, 1912. He was the son of Nathaniel "Thanny" and Rachel Lundy Jones. In the 1920s, the family moved to Harlan County, where Jones earned money by delivering The Cincinnati Post in the town of Bardo.

The family returned to Whitley County, and after graduating from Williamsburg High School, Jones matriculated to Cumberland College (then a junior college, now University of the Cumberlands). He left Cumberland in 1934 and earned education degrees at Union College and Eastern State Teachers College (now Eastern Kentucky University).

Jones and his wife, Marie, had two sons – Pleas David and Gorman.

Jones was an active member of Main Street Baptist Church in Williamsburg, where he was a Sunday school teacher and the church treasurer. He was also a member of a number of civic organizations, including the American Legion, Lions Club, Rotary Club, Freemasons, Shriners, and the Sons of the American Revolution. He sat on the board of directors for Southeastern Kentucky Baptist Hospital.

== Public career ==
Jones was a teacher in the public schools from 1931, until being elected county clerk of Whitley County in 1939. He served in the United States Army during World War II. Returning to Kentucky after the war, he attended the University of Kentucky College of Law, earning a Juris Doctor degree. He was elected county judge in 1953. In 1959, he was elected Commonwealth's attorney for the state's 34th judicial district, including Whitley and McCreary counties. He continued in that office until 1963, when he was elected circuit judge for the district. He was twice re-elected without opposition.

Concurrent with his public service, he chaired the Kentucky Republican Party in the 5th congressional district. He was also a delegate to the 1968 Republican National Convention, where he supported the nomination of Nelson Rockefeller for president, although the nomination ultimately went to Richard Nixon. Although he was recommended by Kentucky's Republican Senators John Sherman Cooper and Marlow Cook, Nixon is said to have refused to appoint Jones to the United States District Court for the Western District of Kentucky because Jones did not support him at the convention.

=== Kentucky Court of Appeals and Supreme Court ===
In August 1973, Democratic Governor Wendell H. Ford appointed Jones to the Kentucky Court of Appeals, then the state's court of last resort, to fill a vacancy caused by the death of Homer Nelkirk. Upset that Jones had accepted an appointment from a Democratic governor, the Republican Party chose Kenton Cooper instead of Jones to run in the special election for the remainder of Newkirk's term. Undeterred, Jones successfully defended the seat as an independent, winning by a 7,500-vote margin.

A constitutional amendment restructured Kentucky's court system in 1976, creating a new Kentucky Court of Appeals and renaming the existing court of last resort to the Kentucky Supreme Court. The sitting justices were retained on the court, with Jones representing the 3rd district. He frequently acted as chief justice in the absence of John S. Palmore. Jones retired from the court in 1979, making him the first justice to retire from the Kentucky Supreme Court.

== Death ==
Jones died of cancer at his home in Williamsburg, Kentucky on September 19, 1986.
