= William E. McAnulty Jr. =

American judge (1947–2007)

Justice of the Kentucky Supreme Court
- In office August 15, 2006 – August 9, 2007
- Preceded by: Martin E. Johnstone
- Succeeded by: Lisabeth Tabor Hughes

Judge of the Kentucky Court of Appeals
- In office November 23, 1998 – August 15, 2006
- Preceded by: Lisabeth Tabor Hughes
- Succeeded by: Thomas B. Wine

Judge of the 30th Kentucky Circuit Court
- In office July 1993 – November 23, 1998
- Preceded by: Martin E. Johnstone
- Succeeded by: Lisabeth Tabor Hughes
- In office January 2, 1984 – January 4, 1990
- Preceded by: Curtis G. Witten
- Succeeded by: Thomas J. Knopf

Judge of the 30th Kentucky District Court
- In office February 21, 1980 – January 2, 1984
- Preceded by: Himself
- Succeeded by: William L. Knpof
- In office January 2, 1978 – January 15, 1980
- Preceded by: Court established
- Succeeded by: Himself

Kentucky Secretary of Justice
- In office February 6, 1980 – February 14, 1980
- Governor: John Y. Brown Jr.
- Preceded by: Jack Smith
- Succeeded by: Neil Welch

Personal details
- Born: October 9, 1947 Indianapolis, Indiana, U.S.
- Died: August 23, 2007 (aged 59) Louisville, Kentucky, U.S.

William Eugene McAnulty Jr. (October 9, 1947 – August 23, 2007) was an American attorney and judge in Louisville, Kentucky who became the first African American justice on the Kentucky Supreme Court. He served on every level court in Kentucky.

== Early life and education ==
The son of a mailman, he attended Shortridge High School, Indiana University, and received a J.D. from the University of Louisville School of Law.

== Career ==
McAnulty became a juvenile court judge in Louisville in 1975, and was elected Jefferson County District Court judge in 1977. In 1980, he left the bench when Governor John Y. Brown Jr. named him state justice secretary, making him the first African-American to hold a cabinet-level post in Kentucky. However, he resigned a month later, saying that the position would force him to spend too much time away from his family; Brown immediately reappointed him to his former seat on the District Court. McAnulty was elected as a Jefferson County Circuit Court judge in 1983. His sister, Jean McAnulty Smith, recalled that on that particular Election Day, he decided to play one-on-one basketball against a 12-year-old neighbor, and McAnulty ended up attending his victory party on crutches. His basketball opponent was future NBA star Allan Houston. As a Circuit Court judge he presided over one of the high-profile and highly emotional Trinity murders cases, sentencing Victor Dewayne Taylor to death, despite McAnulty's own moral reservations about the death penalty.

In 1990, he left the bench for private practice, but was re-elected to the Jefferson County Circuit Court in 1993 as chief judge. The Kentucky Trial Attorneys Association named McAnulty as the Henry V. Pennington Outstanding Judge of the Year in 1997. He was appointed to the Kentucky Court of Appeals in 1998, representing the 4th Appellate District, and wrote about 750 opinions in that position. In 2006, Governor Ernie Fletcher appointed McAnulty to the Kentucky Supreme Court. After his appointment he won election to a full 8-year term in November 2006. McAnulty was a longtime supporter of the Legal Aid Society of Louisville, he spoke at their office dedication ceremony in December 2006 and advocated in his position of Chair of the Metro United Way board for the establishment of their HIV/AIDS legal advocate program.

== Cancer ==
In June 2007, McAnulty was diagnosed with lung cancer that had spread to his brain. He blamed his illness on a 40-year smoking habit that he had finally kicked in December 2006, saying, "I'm paying the piper. I ain't a victim, and I ain't going to whine." He maintained a sense of humor during his illness; before surgery on July 11 to remove a lesion from the base of his brain, he joked with the attending neurosurgeon, "My only question was will this make me a UK fan or affect my political outlook. He assured me it won't, so I'm excited about that."

== Injury and death ==
After he fell and broke his collarbone, McAnulty stepped down from the bench in early August. He died in his home in Louisville's Highlands neighborhood on August 23, 2007, aged 59. A standing-room-only memorial service was held on August 26, 2007, in the Highland Presbyterian Church. He is buried at Cave Hill Cemetery in Louisville. A bust of Judge McAnulty was unveiled in the rotunda of the State Capitol in Frankfort, Kentucky, on February 11, 2010. The bust is located in the antechamber to the Supreme Court courtroom in the State Capitol.

== See also ==
- List of African-American jurists
