= 2018 Kentucky elections =

Kentucky state elections in 2018 were held on Tuesday, November 6, 2018, with the primary elections being held on May 22, 2018. (Note: Some special elections were held on other dates.) These midterm elections occurred during the presidency of Republican Donald Trump and the governorship of Republican Matt Bevin, alongside other elections in the United States. All six of Kentucky's seats in the United States House of Representatives, nineteen of the 38 seats in the Kentucky State Senate, all 100 seats in the Kentucky House of Representatives, and one of the seven seats on the Kentucky Supreme Court were contested. Numerous county and local elections were also contested within the state.

In the United States House of Representatives, all six of Kentucky's incumbent congressional representatives won their individual elections. With 59.59% of ballots cast in favor of the Republican congressional candidates, the Republican party maintained its five-seat majority within the congressional delegation; Representative John Yarmuth of Kentucky's 3rd congressional district maintained his position as the only Democrat in the United States Congress from Kentucky. All six of Kentucky's incumbent representatives were reelected with at least 60% of the vote in their respective districts. Aside from the election in Kentucky's 1st congressional district, all incumbents were challenged by at least one Libertarian or Independent candidate, though no third-party candidates were able to obtain more than 2.5% of the vote.

In the Kentucky General Assembly, Democrats made a net gain of one seat, (Note: Democrats won a net gain of two seats in the Kentucky House of Representatives, but lost one seat in the Kentucky Senate) while Republicans maintained their supermajorities in both chambers of the state legislature. As the office of governor was not contested in the 2018 elections, Republicans maintained their state-level trifecta established in the 2016 elections. As Kentucky's judicial elections are non-partisan, there was no change in the partisan makeup of the Kentucky Supreme Court.

While voter turnout in the United States as a whole reached its highest point seen in a midterm election since 1914, Kentucky voter turnout remained unaffected. With approximately 45.90% of Kentucky's 3.4 million registered voters casting ballots in the election, turnout as a percentage of registered voters remained unchanged from 2014 levels, although the total number of ballots cast did increase.

During the campaign, Democrats focused heavily on public education and teacher pay, frequently attacking Republicans for their support of, among other issues, a controversial overhaul to Kentucky's teacher pension system. Republican messaging centered around a theme of maintaining their trifecta, with claims that a divided legislature would not be able to get anything done.

== Federal offices ==
=== United States House of Representatives ===
In the 2018 elections, Democrats sought to take control of the United States House of Representatives for the first time since the 2010 elections. As all six of Kentucky's voting seats in the 435 member House of Representatives were up for election to serve two-year terms, the Kentucky Democratic Party sought to capitalize on an expected increase in voter turnout to take control of at least two of Kentucky's House seats.

While nationwide the 2018 House elections saw the largest number of retirements by incumbents of any election cycle since at least 1992, none of Kentucky's incumbent Representatives chose to retire. The lack of Republican retirements may have harmed Democratic prospects in the 2018 mid-term elections due to the incumbency advantage.

== State offices ==
=== Kentucky Senate ===
2018 Kentucky State Senate election General election — November 6, 2018
Party	Votes	Percentage	Not up	Contested	Before	After	+/–
Republican	468,530	57.93%	10	16	27	28	▲1
Democratic	325,800	40.28%	8	3	11	10	▼1
Independent	10,946	1.35%	0	0	0	0	0
Write-Ins	3,454	0.43%	0	0	0	0	0
Totals	808,730	100.00%	19	19	38	38	—

=== Kentucky House of Representatives ===
In the 2018 elections, Democrats sought to regain control of the Kentucky House of Representatives, which had been lost following the 2016 elections. All 100 voting seats in the House of Representatives were up for election to serve two-year terms. At the time of the election, Republicans held a supermajority of 62 seats to Democrats 37, with one vacant seat.

The 2018 House elections saw fifteen of the state House's members retiring. Prior to the election, seven House Republicans and eight House Democrats had announced their retirement or resignation, with most declining to run for reelection in order to pursue higher office.

Kentucky House of Representatives election, 2018 General election — November 6, 2018
Party	Votes	Percentage	Seats	+/–
Republican	814,787	53.33%	61	▼1
Democratic	700,379	45.84%	39	▲2
Libertarian	907	0.06%	0	0
Write-In Candidates	8,112	0.53%	0	0
Independent candidates	3,626	0.24%	0	0
Totals	1,527,819	100.00%	100	—
	Note: 1 seat vacant prior to election			

=== Kentucky Supreme Court ===
2018 Kentucky Supreme Court 3rd district election
- November 6, 2018
- District 3
Candidate	Debra H. Lambert	Daniel Ballou
Popular vote	95,237	51,075
Percentage	65.09%	34.91%
- County results Lambert: 50–60% 60–70% 70–80% 80–90% Ballou: 50–60% 60–70% 70–80% 80–90%
Justice before election
Daniel J. Venters
Elected Justice
Debra H. Lambert

The Kentucky Supreme Court is composed of seven justices who are elected in nonpartisan elections by voters. A full term on the court is eight years. Kentucky's nonpartisan judicial elections take place during its general elections. The court is elected to staggered terms, with district 3 being the only one up for election in 2018. Incumbent justice Daniel J. Venters announced he would retire and not seek reelection.

==== Candidates ====
- Debra Hembree Lambert, former judge on the Kentucky Court of Appeals, representing the 3rd Appellate District, Division 1 from 2015 to 2018
- Dan Ballou, chief circuit judge for the 34th Judicial Circuit in Kentucky, first elected in 2008

==== Primary election ====
Primary results
Candidate	Votes	%
Debra Hembree Lambert	64,028	50.18
Dan Ballou	32,277	25.30
David Tapp	31,289	24.52
Total votes	127,594	100.0

==== General election ====
2018 Kentucky Supreme Court 3rd district election
Candidate	Votes	%
Debra Hembree Lambert	95,237	65.09
Dan Ballou	51,075	34.91
Total votes	146,312	100.0

=== Kentucky Court of Appeals ===
Kentucky Court of Appeals 5th district, 1st division, 2018
Party	Candidate	Votes	%
Non-partisan	Pamela R. Goodwine	126,373	56.1
Non-partisan	Robert Johnson	98,861	43.9
Total votes		225,234	100.0

Kentucky Court of Appeals 7th district, 2nd division, 2018
Party	Candidate	Votes	%
Non-partisan	Larry E. Thompson	64,551	53.9
Non-partisan	David Allen Barber	55,310	46.1
Total votes		119,861	100.0

=== Other judicial elections ===
All judges of the Kentucky District Courts were elected in non-partisan elections to four-year terms.

=== Commonwealth’s Attorneys ===
Commonwealth's Attorneys, who serve as the prosecutors for felonies in the state, are elected to six-year terms. One attorney was elected for each of the 57 circuits of the Kentucky Circuit Courts.

=== Circuit Clerks ===
Each county elected a Circuit Court Clerk to a six-year term.

== Local offices ==
=== County officers ===
All county officials were elected in partisan elections to four-year terms. The offices include the County Judge/Executive, the Fiscal Court (Magistrates and/or Commissioners), County Clerk, County Attorney, Jailer, Coroner, Surveyor, Property Value Administrator, Constables, and Sheriff.

=== Mayors ===
Mayors in Kentucky are elected to four-year terms, with cities holding their elections in either presidential or midterm years. Cities with elections in 2018 included those in Louisville and in Lexington.

=== City councils ===
Each incorporated city elected its council members to a two-year term.

=== School boards ===
Local school board members are elected to staggered four-year terms, with half up for election in 2018.

=== Louisville Metro Council ===
The Louisville Metro Council is elected to staggered four-year terms, with odd-numbered districts up for election in 2018.

== Ballot measures ==
=== Amendment 1 ===
- Senate Bill 3 - Results declared invalid by order of the Kentucky Supreme Court

Unofficial results by county: Yes: 50–60%; 60–70%; 70–80%; No: 50–60%

- A Legislatively referred constitutional amendment which was a type of Marsy's Law, which would have added a new section to the Kentucky Constitution regarding the rights of victims accused of a crime. The amendment appeared on the ballot, and was approved with 63% in favor and 37% opposed, however the Kentucky Supreme Court, in a unanimous decision, barred Secretary of State Allison Lundergan Grimes from certifying the election results, declaring "Our constitution is too important and valuable to be amended without the full amendment ever being put to the public." The ruling also stated, "We hold that Section 256 of the Kentucky Constitution requires the General Assembly to submit the full text of a proposed constitutional amendment to the electorate for a vote. Likewise, Section 257 requires the secretary of state to publish the full text of the proposed amendment at least ninety days before the vote. Because the form of the amendment that was published and submitted to the electorate for a vote in this case was not the full text, and was instead a question, the proposed amendment is void."
