= 1981 Kentucky elections =

A general election was held in the U.S. state of Kentucky on November 3, 1981. The primary election for all offices was held on May 26, 1981.

== State offices ==
=== Kentucky Senate ===
Results by district

The Kentucky Senate consists of 38 members. In 1981, half of the chamber (all even-numbered districts) was up for election. Democrats maintained their majority, without gaining or losing any seats. In 1981, senators were elected to five-year terms in order to move future elections to even-numbered years.

=== Kentucky House of Representatives ===
All 100 seats in the Kentucky House of Representatives were up for election in 1981. Democrats maintained their majority, gaining one seat. In 1981, representatives were elected to three-year terms in order to move future elections to even-numbered years.

=== Judicial elections ===
All judges of the Kentucky District Courts were elected in non-partisan elections to four-year terms.

=== Commonwealth’s Attorneys ===
Commonwealth's Attorneys, who serve as the prosecutors for felonies in the state, are elected to six-year terms. One attorney is elected for each of the 57 circuits of the Kentucky Circuit Courts.

=== Circuit Clerks ===
Each county elected a Circuit Court Clerk to a six-year term.

== Local offices ==
=== County officers ===
All county officials were elected in partisan elections to four-year terms. The offices include the County Judge/Executive, the Fiscal Court (Magistrates and/or Commissioners), County Clerk, County Attorney, Jailer, Coroner, Surveyor, Property Value Administrator, Constables, and Sheriff.

=== Mayors ===
Mayors in Kentucky are elected to four-year terms. Prior to 1992, cities held their elections in odd-numbered years, in either the year preceding or following a presidential election.

=== City councils ===
Each incorporated city elected its council members to a two-year term.

== Ballot measures ==
=== Amendment 1 ===
==== Text ====
Shall Sections 71, 82, 93 and 99 of the Constitution be amended to provide (1) that the governor, lieutenant governor, treasurer, auditor of public accounts, secretary of state, commissioner of agriculture, labor and statistics, attorney general, superintendent of public instruction, and register of the land office shall be eligible to election for two (2) successive terms and shall be ineligible to re-election for the succeeding four (4) years after the expiration of the second term of which they have been elected; (2) that the sheriff shall be eligible to election for successive terms.

==== Results ====
Results by county: No: 50–60%; 60–70%; 70–80%; 80–90%; Yes: 50–60%

Amendment 1
Choice	Votes	%
For	213,988	35.94
Against	381,362	64.06
Total	595,350	100.00

=== Amendment 2 ===
==== Text ====
Shall section 170 of the constitution be amended and section 172B be added to the constitution notwithstanding contrary provisions of sections 170, 171, 172, or 174 of the constitution to provide (1) that real property maintained as the permanent residence of the owner who is classified as totally disabled under a program authorized or administered by any agency of the United States government or by the railroad retirement system, be exempt from taxation up to the assessed valuation of sixty-five hundred dollars on said residence and contiguous real property, except for assessment for special benefits; provided the property owner received disability payments pursuant to such disability classification for the entirety of the particular taxation period, and has filed with the appropriate local assessor by December 31 of the taxation period, on forms provided therefore, a signed statement indicating continuing disability as provided herein made under penalty of perjury; and (2) that the General Assembly may provide by general law that county, municipal and urban-county governing bodies may declare property assessment or reassessment moratoriums for qualifying units of real property to encourage the repair, rehabilitation, or restoration of existing improvements thereon; however, prior to the enactment of any moratorium program, the General Assembly shall provide or direct the local governing authority to provide property qualification standards for participation in the program and a duration limitation on the moratorium not to extend beyond five years for any particular unit of real property and improvements thereon.

==== Results ====
Results by county: Yes: 50–60%; 60–70%; No: 50–60%; 60–70%; 70–80%; 80–90%

Amendment 2
Choice	Votes	%
For	254,065	50.61
Against	247,939	49.39
Total	502,004	100.00

== See also ==
- Elections in Kentucky
- Politics of Kentucky
- Political party strength in Kentucky
