= 1994 Kentucky elections =

A general election was held in the U.S. state of Kentucky on November 8, 1994. The primary election for all offices was held on May 24, 1994.

== Federal offices ==
=== United States House of Representatives ===
Kentucky has six congressional districts, electing four Republicans and two Democrats. A special election was also held in the 2nd district in May 1994.

== State offices ==
=== Kentucky Senate ===
Results by district

The Kentucky Senate consists of 38 members. In 1994, half of the chamber (all even-numbered districts) was up for election. Democrats maintained their majority, losing three seats.

=== Kentucky House of Representatives ===
Results by district

All 100 seats in the Kentucky House of Representatives were up for election in 1994. Democrats maintained their majority, losing eight seats.

=== Kentucky Supreme Court ===
1994 Kentucky Supreme Court 3rd district election
- November 8, 1994
- District 3
Candidate	Joseph Lambert
Popular vote	26,058
Percentage	100.0%
Justice before election
Joseph Lambert
Elected Justice
Joseph Lambert

The Kentucky Supreme Court consists of seven justices elected in non-partisan elections to staggered eight-year terms. District 3 was up for election in 1994.

==== District 3 ====
1994 Kentucky Supreme Court 3rd district election
Candidate	Votes	%
Joseph E. Lambert (incumbent)	Unopposed	
Total votes	26,058	100.0

== Local offices ==
=== School boards ===
Local school board members are elected to staggered four-year terms, with half up for election in 1994.

== Ballot measures ==
=== Amendment 1 ===
==== Text ====
Are you in favor of amending the constitution to require cities, counties and taxing districts to adopt a balanced budget prior to each fiscal year, and prohibit them from expending any funds in excess of the revenues for that year; allow the General Assembly to classify cities based on factors other than just population; allow the General Assembly to authorize cities to exercise any power or function that furthers a public purpose and does not conflict with any constitutional or statutory provision; and allow the General Assembly to make laws regarding the existence, boundaries, form of government, functions, and officers of cities?

==== Results ====
Results by county: Yes: 50–60%; 60–70%; No: 50–60%; 60–70%; 70–80%

Amendment 1
Choice	Votes	%
For	273,142	53.95
Against	233,189	46.05
Total	506,331	100.00

== See also ==
- Elections in Kentucky
- Politics of Kentucky
- Political party strength in Kentucky
