= Daniel J. Venters =

American judge

Justice of the Kentucky Supreme Court
- In office August 9, 2008 – January 7, 2019
- Preceded by: Joseph Lambert
- Succeeded by: Debra H. Lambert

Judge of the 28th Kentucky Circuit Court
- In office January 2, 1984 – June 16, 2003
- Preceded by: John T. Mandt
- Succeeded by: Robert Gillum

Judge of the 28th Kentucky District Court
- In office February 6, 1979 – January 2, 1984
- Preceded by: John Calvin Aker
- Succeeded by: William T. Cain

Daniel J. Venters is an American attorney and jurist who served as a justice of the Kentucky Supreme Court from 2008 until his retirement in 2019.

== Biography ==
He was appointed to the bench in 2008, and in 2010 was elected to serve a full term of office, which ended in January, 2019. He has previously sat on the Kentucky District Court for Pulaski and Rockcastle counties and as a Kentucky Circuit Court Judge for Pulaski, Lincoln and Rockcastle counties. He is a 1975 graduate of the University of Kentucky College of Law. and a 1972 graduate of The Ohio State University.
