= BluegrassReport.org =

Defunct blog that covered the Democratic Party of Kentucky

BluegrassReport.org is a defunct Democratic Party-oriented political blog that covered Kentucky politics, especially with regard to former Governor Ernie Fletcher (R), as well as state government in general and federal government officeholders representing the state. The blog, which further covered ongoing intra-party operations, political issues and scandals, was started in June 2005 by Democratic consultant Mark Nickolas, former campaign manager for both Speaker of the Kentucky House Jody Richards and U.S. House Rep. Ben Chandler's 2003 gubernatorial campaign . The blog, edited solely by Nickolas for most of its active period, described itself as "An Unfiltered and Candid Look at Politics, Politicians and the Media in Kentucky".

The chief recipient of the blog's criticism was Governor Fletcher. Fletcher and many of his subordinates were indicted as part of the state's 2005–2006 merit system investigation, and this, in addition to other controversies surrounding the Fletcher administration, had become the focus of a large number of posts. Other major targets were Kentucky Supreme Court Chief Justice Joseph Lambert, Republican Senate President David L. Williams and former Kentucky Democratic Party chairman Jerry Lundergan.

On May 24, 2007, Nickolas announced on the blog that he would be moving with his girlfriend to Montana, her home state, at the end of the month. Nickolas continued blogging up until a week before he closed the blog permanently on July 2. In Montana, Nickolas started a new blog called Rocky Mountain Report.

After an infusion of financial support, BluegrassReport.org was revived on August 6, 2007, to continue running at least through the 2007 Fall statewide campaigns in Kentucky. According to the Internet Archive, the last post on the blog occurred on August 19, 2008, and the website was shut down sometime in 2009.

== Controversy ==
In June 2006, the blog became the focus of a controversy involving a state government clampdown on the access of particular genres of websites, including political blogs, where BluegrassReport.org amongst a range of blogs was blocked, while some blogs remained accessible, leaving a widely reported impression that the blocks were selective and perhaps political in nature. On July 10, 2006, Public Citizen filed a lawsuit on behalf of Nickolas challenging the constitutionality of the state government's blocking actions.

On January 17, 2007, Nickolas was indicted on charges of willfully failing to file any state income tax returns for 2003, 2004 or 2005. The Courier-Journal reported that Nickolas told the paper he paid his state income taxes in full for those years in December 2006, after the state Revenue Cabinet informed him that he was under investigation. The Lexington Herald-Leader reported that Nickolas paid those taxes with checks from an account in the name of the nonprofit foundation through which he runs his blog. The case against Nickolas was dropped on May 18, 2007.

== Awards ==
BluegrassReport.org tied with Tennessee Guerilla Women to win the 2005 Koufax Award for "Best State or Local Blog".
