= Kelly Thompson (judge) =

American judge (born 1947 or 1948)

Justice of the Kentucky Supreme Court
- Incumbent
- Assumed office January 2, 2023
- Preceded by: John D. Minton Jr.

Judge of the Kentucky Court of Appeals
- In office January 1, 2007 – January 2, 2023
- Preceded by: John D. Minton Jr.
- Succeeded by: Kelly Mark Easton

Personal details
- Born: 1947 or 1948 (age 77–78)
- Party: Republican
- Education: Western Kentucky University (BA); University of Kentucky (JD)

Kelly David Thompson Jr. (born 1947 or 1948) is an American attorney and jurist from Kentucky who has served as a justice of the Kentucky Supreme Court since 2023. He was previously a judge of the Kentucky Court of Appeals from 2007 to 2023.

== Education ==
Thompson graduated from Western Kentucky University in 1968 with a Bachelor of Arts and a teaching certificate. He earned a Juris Doctor from the University of Kentucky College of Law in 1972.

== Career ==
After graduating law school, from 1972 to 1973 he was chief trial counsel for the Kentucky Department of Highways in Hardin County and from 1973 to 1974, he served as a law clerk for the Kentucky Court of Appeals. From 1974 to 2006 he was a lawyer in the Bowling Green area.

Thompson unsuccessfully ran for a seat on the Kentucky Court of Appeals in 1983 and 2003, as well as a seat on the Bowling Green City Commission in 1995 and 1996. He was elected to the Kentucky Court of Appeals in 2006.

=== Kentucky Supreme Court ===
On November 8, 2022, Thompson was elected as a justice of the Kentucky Supreme Court, defeating his challenger, healthcare lawyer Shawn Marie Alcott. He replaced retiring Chief Justice John D. Minton Jr.

==== 2026 censure ====
In April 2026, Thompson was censured by both chambers of the Kentucky General Assembly as part of the wider controversy surrounding the impeachment of circuit judge Julie Goodman. Thompson authored a concurring opinion to the supreme court's decision to enjoin Goodman's removal trial, which stated the following:

Threatening to file inappropriate impeachment proceedings and following through on them to disrupt a tribunal, influence the outcome of a case, and/or to disparage a judge could result in KBA discipline for any lawyers involved if attorneys take actions in which they are acting in bad faith...Additionally, such actions can constitute the crime of intimidating a participant in the legal process via use of a threat to influence or attempt to influence that person's vote, decision, or opinion. This constitutes a Class D felony.

Senate president Robert Stivers and House speaker David W. Osborne filed identical resolutions in both chambers, alleging that this language constitutes a threat for both professional and criminal consequences against any member of the General Assembly who is an attorney and participates in Goodman's impeachment proceedings. The resolutions were adopted, which censured Thompson and directed for a complaint to be filed against him with the state's judicial conduct commission.

== Electoral history ==
=== 1983 ===
1983 Kentucky Court of Appeals 2nd district, 1st division election
Party	Candidate	Votes	%
Nonpartisan	John D. Miller	30,823	59.7
Nonpartisan	Kelly Thompson	20,791	40.3
Total votes		51,614	100.0

=== 1995 ===
1995 Bowling Green City Commission special election
Party	Candidate	Votes	%
Nonpartisan	Dianne B. Howerton	4,533	48.1
Nonpartisan	Kelly Thompson	4,375	46.4
Nonpartisan	Joe Stark Gerard	522	5.5
Total votes		9,430	100.0

=== 1996 ===
Primary election results (vote for 4)
Party	Candidate	Votes	%
Nonpartisan	Joe W. Denning	2,308	N/A
Nonpartisan	Jim Breece	2,263	N/A
Nonpartisan	Dianne B. Howerton	2,212	N/A
Nonpartisan	Johnny Oldham	2,176	N/A
Nonpartisan	Kelly Thompson	2,052	N/A
Nonpartisan	Larry J. Pack	1,855	N/A
Nonpartisan	Robbie Bond	1,587	N/A
Nonpartisan	Jim McDaniels	1,345	N/A
Nonpartisan	Bob Welch	1,236	N/A
Nonpartisan	Benjamin Craig Long	722	N/A

1996 Bowling Green City Commission election (vote for 4)
Party	Candidate	Votes	%
Nonpartisan	Dianne B. Howerton	7,269	N/A
Nonpartisan	Jim Breece	6,432	N/A
Nonpartisan	Johnny Oldham	6,154	N/A
Nonpartisan	Joe W. Denning	6,136	N/A
Nonpartisan	Kelly Thompson	5,367	N/A
Nonpartisan	Larry J. Pack	5,331	N/A
Nonpartisan	Robbie Bond	4,108	N/A

=== 2003 ===
2003 Kentucky Court of Appeals 2nd district, 2nd division special election
Party	Candidate	Votes	%
Nonpartisan	John D. Minton Jr.	54,222	55.2
Nonpartisan	Kelly Thompson	43,954	44.8
Total votes		98,176	100.0

=== 2006 ===
2006 Kentucky Court of Appeals 2nd district, 2nd division election
Party	Candidate	Votes	%
Nonpartisan	Kelly Thompson	68,636	58.3
Nonpartisan	Dwight T. Lovan	49,023	41.7
Total votes		117,659	100.0

=== 2014 ===
2014 Kentucky Court of Appeals 2nd district, 2nd division election
Party	Candidate	Votes	%
Nonpartisan	Kelly Thompson	96,420	70.0
Nonpartisan	Mark H. Flener	41,343	30.0
Total votes		137,763	100.0

=== 2022 ===
2022 Kentucky Supreme Court 2nd district election
Party	Candidate	Votes	%
Nonpartisan	Kelly Thompson	81,761	62.5
Nonpartisan	Shawn Marie Alcott	49,119	37.5
Total votes		130,880	100.0

Legal offices
Preceded by John D. Minton Jr.	Justice of the Kentucky Supreme Court; 2023–present	Incumbent
