= John D. White (judge) =

American judge (1915–1999)

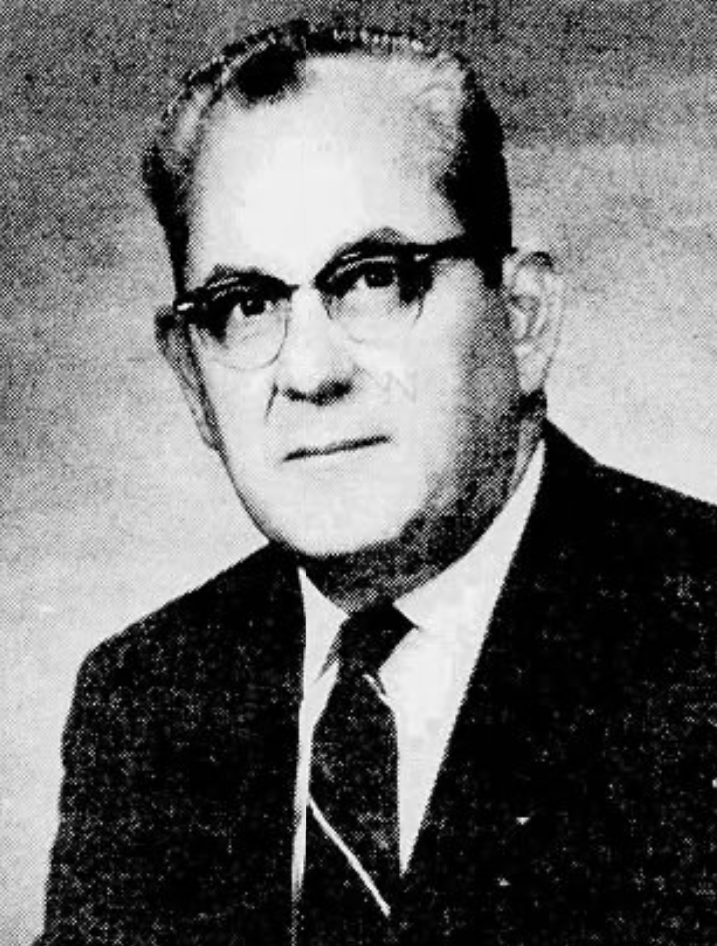
- White, c. 1976

Justice of the Kentucky Supreme Court
- In office March 10, 1986 – January 5, 1987
- Appointed by: Martha Layne Collins
- Preceded by: John Calvin Aker
- Succeeded by: Joseph Lambert

Judge of the Kentucky Court of Appeals
- In office August 17, 1976 – March 10, 1986
- Preceded by: Office established
- Succeeded by: Robert W. Dyche III

County Attorney of Clay County
- In office May 1975 – August 1976
- Preceded by: Charles C. Smith
- Succeeded by: Roy W. House

Personal details
- Born: John Daugherty White; October 28, 1915 East Liverpool, Ohio
- Died: November 19, 1999 (aged 84) Olathe, Kansas
- Party: Republican
- Education: University of Kentucky (BA); University of Louisville (LLB); Louisville Presbyterian Theological Seminary (BD)

John Daugherty White (October 28, 1915 – November 19, 1999) was an American attorney, minister, and jurist who served as a justice of the Kentucky Supreme Court from March 1986 to January 1987.

A veteran of World War II, White assumed the practice of law after returning home to Manchester in 1945. However, he left the law ten years later to enter seminary school, and became an ordained presbyterian minister. He continued his ministry until the 1970s, when he resumed the practice of law. He served as county attorney of Clay County before being appointed as one of the first judges to serve on the newly formed Kentucky Court of Appeals. Following nearly a decade on the court, he was appointed to fill a vacancy on the Kentucky Supreme Court in 1986, after which he retired at the end of his term.

== Early life and education ==
John Daughtery White was born on October 28, 1915, in East Liverpool, Ohio, and raised in Manchester, Kentucky. He graduated from the University of Kentucky with a Bachelor of Arts degree in 1936. While a student, he participated in ROTC and was a member of Pershing Rifles. Afterwards, he attended and received his law degree from the University of Louisville School of Law, and was admitted to the Kentucky bar in 1939.

White served in the U.S. military during World War II, serving in the Pacific theater and participating in the liberation of the Philippines. While still deployed in 1945, he unsuccessfully sought the Republican nomination for commonwealth attorney of Kentucky's 27th Judicial circuit. In March 1946, he was discharged from the military, and returned to Manchester to practice law. He remained involved in politics, campaigning for John Sherman Cooper in 1946 and 1954.

== Career ==
=== Ministry ===
During this time, White also served as a lay minister. In 1955 however, he felt a call to full-time ministry and left the practice of law, enrolling at the Louisville Presbyterian Theological Seminary. After his ordination, he was a pastor at a church in Columbia, Kentucky, before moving to Lawrenceville, Illinois, and assuming leadership of the city's first presbyterian church.

After fifteen years in ministry, White retired and returned to Manchester. While he still continued to speak at various churches, he resumed the practice of law.

=== Return to law ===
After returning to the legal profession, White served as an assistant commonwealth attorney. Following the death of incumbent Clay County Attorney Charles C. Smith in early 1975, White was appointed to the position, and was elected unopposed that November.

=== Judicial tenures ===
In November 1975, voters approved a constitutional amendment which restructured Kentucky's court system. Notably, it renamed the old Kentucky Court of Appeals to the Kentucky Supreme Court, and formed a new court of appeals to serve as the state's intermediate court. On August 16, 1976, White was appointed by Governor Julian Carroll alongside thirteen others to constitute the newly created court of appeals, who were sworn in the next day. Of these fourteen new judges, White was one of only three Republicans. He was unopposed for election to a full eight-year term that November, and reelected again in 1983. During his time on the court, he authored more than 600 opinions.

In early March 1986, Justice John Calvin Aker of the Kentucky Supreme Court resigned to return to his private practice. Shortly thereafter, Governor Martha Layne Collins appointed White to succeed Aker. White did not file for election to the seat, and retired at the end of his term in January 1987. However, he did occasionally serve as a special judge of the court of appeals.

== Death ==
White died on November 19, 1999, while visiting one of his daughters in Olathe, Kansas, at the age of 85.

Political offices
Preceded by John Calvin Aker	Justice of the Kentucky Supreme Court; 1986–1987	Succeeded by Joseph Lambert

Political offices
Preceded by Office established	Judge of the Kentucky Court of Appeals; 1976–1986	Succeeded by Robert W. Dyche III
