= Lisabeth Tabor Hughes =

American judge (born 1955)

Lisabeth Hughes

Justice of the Kentucky Supreme Court
- In office September 10, 2007 – January 2, 2023
- Preceded by: William E. McAnulty Jr.
- Succeeded by: Angela McCormick Bisig

Judge of the Kentucky Court of Appeals
- In office July 1, 2006 – September 10, 2007
- Preceded by: William L. Knopf
- Succeeded by: Denise Clayton
- In office February 20, 1997 – November 23, 1998
- Appointed by: Paul E. Patton
- Preceded by: Martin E. Johnstone
- Succeeded by: William E. McAnulty Jr.

Judge of the 30th Kentucky Circuit Court
- In office January 28, 1999 – July 1, 2006
- Preceded by: William E. McAnulty Jr.
- Succeeded by: Mitch Perry

Personal details
- Born: October 1955 (age 70–71) Marion, Kentucky, U.S.
- Education: University of Louisville (BA, JD)

Lisabeth Tabor Hughes (previously Lisabeth Hughes Abramson; born October 1955) is an American lawyer who served as a justice of the Kentucky Supreme Court from 2007 to 2023. She is a former nominee to be a United States circuit judge of the United States Court of Appeals for the Sixth Circuit.

== Early life and education ==
Born in Marion, Kentucky, and raised in Princeton, Kentucky, Hughes received a Bachelor of Arts degree, summa cum laude, in 1977 from the University of Louisville and then received a Juris Doctor, magna cum laude, in 1980 from the University of Louisville School of Law where she served as Executive Editor of the school's law review and was named Outstanding Graduate.

== Professional career ==
Hughes began her career as an associate at the law firm of Greenebaum Doll & McDonald (now Dentons Bingham Greenebaum LLP) and later joined the law firm of Hirn Doheny Reed & Harper, where she became a partner in 1994. In 1996, she became a founding partner at the law firm of Reed Weitkamp Schell & Vice. While in private practice, Hughes handled a variety of business and commercial litigation in both state and federal courts. She served as a Judge on the Kentucky Court of Appeals from 1997 until 1998 and again after Kentucky Governor Ernie Fletcher appointed her to the court on June 30, 2006. In 1999, Justice Hughes was appointed and then elected to the Jefferson Circuit Court, where she served for over seven years.

== Kentucky Supreme Court service ==
On September 10, 2007, Fletcher appointed Hughes to the bench to fill the vacant seat of the late Justice William E. McAnulty Jr. Hughes won re-election in 2008 and was elected without opposition in 2014. On February 3, 2017, Chief Justice John D. Minton Jr. named Hughes deputy chief justice. She left office on January 1, 2023.

== Consideration for Sixth Circuit ==
In March 2014, the FBI began vetting Hughes for the seat on the United States Court of Appeals for the Sixth Circuit that was vacated by Judge Boyce F. Martin Jr., who retired in 2013. On March 17, 2016, President Barack Obama nominated Justice Hughes to the Sixth Circuit Court of Appeals stating, "Justice Lisabeth Tabor Hughes has a long and impressive record of service and a history of handing down fair and judicious decisions. She will be a thoughtful and distinguished addition to the Sixth Circuit, and I am extremely pleased to put her forward." Her nomination expired on January 3, 2017, with the end of the 114th Congress.

== See also ==
- Barack Obama judicial appointment controversies

Legal offices
Preceded by William E. McAnulty Jr.	Justice of the Kentucky Supreme Court; 2007–2023	Succeeded by Angela McCormick Bisig
