= Maze (surname) =

Maze is a surname. Notable people with the surname include:

- Bill Maze (born 1946), American politician
- Bill Maze (tennis) (born 1956), American tennis player
- Daniel Maze, Belgian film director
- Irv Maze, American judge
- Michael Maze, Danish table tennis player
- Terrell Maze (born 1984), American football player
- Tina Maze, Slovenian skier
