= Angela McCormick Bisig =

American judge (born 1964 or 1965)

Justice of the Kentucky Supreme Court
- Incumbent
- Assumed office January 2, 2023
- Preceded by: Lisabeth Tabor Hughes

Judge of the 30th Kentucky Circuit Court
- In office November 2012 – January 2, 2023
- Preceded by: Irv Maze
- Succeeded by: Patricia Morris

Judge of the 30th Kentucky District Court
- In office January 6, 2003 – November 2012
- Preceded by: Jim Green
- Succeeded by: Eric Haner

Personal details
- Born: 1964 or 1965 (age 60–61)
- Education: University of Louisville (BA, JD)

Angela McCormick Bisig (born 1964 or 1965) is an American lawyer from Kentucky who serves as a justice of the Kentucky Supreme Court. She previously served as chief judge of the Jefferson County Circuit Court from 2020 to 2023.

== Education ==
Bisig received a Bachelor of Arts from the University of Louisville in 1987 and a Juris Doctor from the University of Louisville School of Law in 1990.

== Career ==
As a lawyer, Bisig practiced civil law with the law firms of Brown, Todd & Heyburn and Greenebaum Doll & McDonald; she also worked as a prosecutor.

=== Judicial state court service ===
In 2002, Bisig was elected to serve as a Jefferson County District Judge. She was elected the chief judge of the District Court in 2012. She was elected to the Circuit Court in November 2012. She served as chief judge of the Circuit Court from 2020 until her election to the Kentucky Supreme Court.

=== Kentucky Supreme Court ===
On November 8, 2022, Bisig was elected as a justice of the Kentucky Supreme Court, defeating challenger Jason Bowman. She was endorsed by Citizens for Better Judges. Her term began on January 2, 2023, and she was sworn in on January 10, 2023.

== Personal life ==
Bisig is married to Arnold Rivera and has three sons and two stepchildren.

== Electoral history ==
JUSTICE OF THE SUPREME COURT 4th Supreme Court District, 2022
Nonpartisan	Votes	Pct	Nonpartisan	Votes	Pct
Angela McCormick Bisig	174,279	80%	Jason A. Bowman	42,628	20%

Legal offices
Preceded by Lisabeth Tabor Hughes	Justice of the Kentucky Supreme Court; 2023–present	Incumbent
