= John David Preston =

American politician (born 1950)

Judge of the 24th Kentucky Circuit Court
- In office December 28, 2006 – January 2, 2023
- Preceded by: Daniel Sparks
- Succeeded by: John Kevin Holbrook

Member of the Kentucky Senate from the 25th district
- In office March 10, 1994 – January 1, 1997
- Preceded by: David LeMaster
- Succeeded by: Robert Stivers (redistricting)

Mayor of Paintsville, Kentucky
- In office October 18, 1988 – December 31, 1993
- Preceded by: Robert Wiley
- Succeeded by: Robin T. Cooper

Commonwealth's Attorney for Kentucky's 24th Judicial Circuit
- In office January 4, 1981 – January 5, 1987
- Preceded by: Paul Deaton
- Succeeded by: Leo A. Marcum

Personal details
- Born: December 29, 1950 (age 75) Paintsville, Kentucky
- Party: Republican
- Education: Harvard University (BA); University of Kentucky (JD)

John David Preston (born December 29, 1950) is an American politician and author from Kentucky who served in various elected and judicial offices. He was a member of the Kentucky Senate from 1994 to 1997, representing Kentucky's 25th Senate district, which at the time included Johnson, Lawrence, and Boyd counties.

== Early life and education ==
Preston was born in Paintsville, Kentucky to J. Frank and Olga (Auxier) Preston. He graduated as valedictorian from Prestonsburg High School in 1969, and attended Harvard University on a scholarship. In 1973, he graduated magna cum laude from Harvard with a Bachelor of Arts degree in history. He returned to Kentucky, and graduated with a Juris Doctor from the University of Kentucky College of Law in 1976. During his time at UK, Preston served as a member of the school's moot court board, law journal staff, and clerked for an attorney in Louisa, Kentucky.

After law school, Preston entered into a private practice.

== Political career ==
=== Party leadership ===
In April 1980, Preston was chosen as chairman of the Johnson County Republican Party. He also served as Johnson County campaign chairman for various campaigns such as former Governor Louie Nunn's unsuccessful reelection bid during the 1979 Kentucky gubernatorial election and Ronald Reagan during the 1980 United States presidential election.

=== Commonwealth's attorney ===
In 1981, Preston won the Republican primary for Commonwealth's attorney of Kentucky's 24th judicial circuit with 5,477 votes (56%) against Paul D. Deaton, and would win the general election with 8,193 votes (57.1%) against Democratic candidate L. E. Spencer. At that time, Preston was the youngest person ever elected to serve in the position.

During his tenure, Preston was commended by then-judge/executive of Jefferson County Mitch McConnell for handling a backlog of four hundred felony cases, and modernizing his office into, "... the most proficient Commonwealth's Attorney office in Kentucky." McConnell also praised Preston for serving as director of Hope Haven Inc., a home program for displaced children, as well as a county coordinator for a fingerprinting project with the Kentucky Task Force for Missing and Exploited Children.

Preston served only one term, choosing not to seek reelection in 1987.

=== Paintsville city council and mayor ===
In 1987, Preston chose to run for one of six seats on the Paintsville city council instead of seeking reelection as Commonwealth's attorney. Preston was the top vote-getter of the race, garnering 521 votes during the primary against thirteen candidates, and 581 votes during the general election against twelve candidates. After assuming office on January 5, 1988, he was chosen as mayor pro tempore.

However, he served only ten months before Paintsville Mayor Robert Wiley resigned and Preston was chosen by the council as his replacement in October 1988. He served the remainder of Wiley's unexpired term before winning his own full-term as mayor in November 1989. His tenure was noted for his attempts to alleviate prior financial troubles for the city as well as the expansion of water lines to rural areas of Johnson County.

=== Kentucky Senate ===
In 1993, incumbent Senator David LeMaster of Kentucky's 25th Senate district was indicted on charges of extortion and racketeering as part of the FBI's Operation Boptrot. He resigned in January 1994 following his conviction for perjury, leaving the 25th district seat vacant. Governor Brereton C. Jones called for a special election for the seat to be held on March 8, which Preston would win with 6,776 votes (63%) against Democratic candidate Marcus Woodward. He assumed office on March 10, but struggled with the partisan divide in the Democratic controlled chamber.

In 1996, Johnson County was redistricted into the heavily Democratic 29th Senate district. Preston was unopposed in the Republican primary for the seat, but was defeated in the general election, garnering 11,978 votes (38.8%) against incumbent Democratic Senator Benny Ray Bailey. Preston later stated that his largest political regret was choosing to challenge Bailey instead of running for Kentucky's 97th House district, a favorable Republican seat then occupied by Democratic Representative Hubert Collins.

=== Appointments ===
During his tenure as chairman of the Big Sandy Regional Jail Authority and Paintsville Utilities Commission, Preston was asked by Governor Ernie Fletcher to serve as Deputy Secretary of the Cabinet for National Resources and Environmental Protection. He declined, but later accepted an appointment as chairman of the Kentucky Mine Safety Commission. In February 2005, Governor Fletcher appointed Preston as a family court judge of the 24th judicial circuit following the retirement of Judge Stephen N. Frazier.

Later that year, Preston was considered for appointment by President George W. Bush to fill a vacant seat on the United States District Court for the Eastern District of Kentucky left by the retirement of Judge Karl Spillman Forester. According to Preston, he had the support of Senator Jim Bunning while Senator Mitch McConnell backed United States Attorney Gregory Van Tatenhove. The decision allegedly came down to the White House Counsel office, and Tatenhove was chosen following an interview process. Preston stated, "It was a tie between the Republican senators, and it went down to White House counsel, and they chose a guy who was ten years younger... I can’t really quarrel with them about that. I would have liked to have the job, but I can’t really quarrel with their process.”

=== Circuit judge ===
Preston continued to serve as a family court judge until 2006 when Circuit Judge Daniel Sparks of the 24th judicial circuit chose not to seek reelection. Preston was unopposed in both the primary and general election for the seat, winning the latter with 12,019 votes. He assumed office on December 28.

Preston was unopposed for reelection in 2014, winning with 11,841 votes. Preston did not seek reelection in 2022, retiring at the end of his term on January 2, 2023.

== Personal life ==
Preston is married to Mary Avonne Stephenson of Buffalo, New York. Following David's retirement, the couple moved to Bradenton, Florida. They have one daughter together.

Preston is active in many community and social organizations including the University of Kentucky Alumni Association, Jaycees, Rotary Club, Freemasonry, Shriners, Sons of the American Revolution, and Military Order of the Loyal Legion. At various periods throughout his life, he served in leadership roles for these organization such as president of the Paintsville-Johnson County Jaycees and chancellor of the Big Sandy Chapter of the Sons of the American Revolution.

== Publications ==
=== Nonfiction ===
- History of Johnson County, Kentucky (2025)
- Civil War Soldiers of the Big Sandy Valley of Kentucky (2022)
- Civil War Soldiers of Letcher County, Kentucky (2021)
- Genealogical Writings of Stephen Ray Preston Brackett (2017)
- Civil War Soldiers of Boyd County, Kentucky (2015)
- Civil War Soldiers of Magoffin County, Kentucky (2015)
- Civil War Soldiers of Morgan County, Kentucky (2015)
- Judges of the Twenty-fourth Circuit of Kentucky (2014)
- History of the First United Methodist Church of Paintsville, Kentucky (2014)
- The Civil War in the Big Sandy Valley of Kentucky 1st ed. (1984), 2nd ed. (2008)

=== Forewords ===
- Kentucky Archives: Johnson County Vital Statistics 1843-1904 (2013)
- 1890 Special Veterans Census for Eastern Kentucky (2013)
- The Founding of Harman's Station and the Wiley Captivity (1989)
