= John Minton =

John Minton may refer to:

- John D. Minton Jr. (born 1952), Kentucky Supreme Court judge
- John Minton (artist) (1917–1957), artist and illustrator
- Big John Studd (1948–1995), wrestler
