= Kentucky's 25th Senate district =

American legislative district

Kentucky's 25th State Senate district
Senator
Robert Stivers; R–Manchester
since January 1, 1997
- Registration: 76.3% Republican; 17.5% Democratic; 5.8% No party preference
- Demographics: 93.6% White; 2.2% Black; 1.4% Hispanic; 0.1% Asian; 0.1% Native American; 0.1% Other; 2.4% Multiracial
- Population (2023): 120,823
- Registered voters (2025): 90,101

Kentucky's 25th Senatorial district is one of 38 districts in the Kentucky Senate. Located in the eastern part of the state, it comprises the counties of Clay, Jackson, Knox, McCreary, Owsley, and Whitley. It has been represented by Robert Stivers (R–Manchester) since 1997. Stivers has served as president of the Senate since 2013. As of 2023, the district had a population of 120,823.

== Voter registration ==
On January 1, 2025, the district had 90,101 registered voters, who were registered with the following parties.

Party	Registration	
Party	Voters	%
Republican	68,734	76.29
Democratic	15,765	17.50
Independent	2,674	2.97
Libertarian	269	0.30
Green	32	0.04
Constitution	26	0.03
Socialist Workers	8	0.01
Reform	3	0.00
"Other"	2,590	2.87
Total	90,101	100.00
Source: Kentucky State Board of Elections

== Election results from statewide races ==
=== 2014 – 2020 ===
Year	Office	Results (Note: Figures presented in this table are calculated by summing precinct election results published by the Kentucky State Board of Elections, using precinct data that list each precinct's senatorial district.)
2014	Senator	McConnell 68.7 - 28.1%
2015	Governor	Bevin 67.3 - 29.6%
2015	Secretary of State	Knipper 61.0 - 39.0%
2015	Attorney General	Westerfield 66.3 - 33.7%
2015	Auditor of Public Accounts	Harmon 68.1 - 31.9%
2015	State Treasurer	Ball 73.4 - 26.6%
2015	Commissioner of Agriculture	Quarles 74.9 - 25.1%
2016	President	Trump 82.0 - 15.2%
2016	Senator	Paul 70.5 - 29.5%
2019	Governor	Bevin 65.3 - 32.6%
2019	Secretary of State	Adams 73.6 - 26.4%
2019	Attorney General	Cameron 74.7 - 25.3%
2019	Auditor of Public Accounts	Harmon 77.0 - 20.9%
2019	State Treasurer	Ball 79.3 - 20.7%
2019	Commissioner of Agriculture	Quarles 77.3 - 20.7%
2020	President	Trump 82.7 - 16.0%
2020	Senator	McConnell 77.1 - 18.5%
2020	Amendment 1	Yes 56.5 - 43.5%
2020	Amendment 2	No 67.8 - 32.2%

=== 2022 – present ===
Year	Office	Results
2022	Senator	Paul 83.7 - 16.3%
2022	Amendment 1	Yes 59.7 - 40.3%
2022	Amendment 2	Yes 71.2 - 28.8%
2023	Governor	Cameron 67.8 - 32.2%
2023	Secretary of State	Adams 82.5 - 17.4%
2023	Attorney General	Coleman 81.2 - 18.8%
2023	Auditor of Public Accounts	Ball 83.1 - 16.9%
2023	State Treasurer	Metcalf 80.7 - 19.3%
2023	Commissioner of Agriculture	Shell 82.6 - 17.4%
2024	President	Trump 86.7 - 12.3%
2024	Amendment 1	Yes 66.6 - 33.4%
2024	Amendment 2	No 61.9 - 38.1%

== List of members representing the district ==
Member	Party	Years	Electoral history	District location
Wendell Van Hoose (Tutor Key)	Republican	January 1, 1964 – June 10, 1971	Elected in 1963. Reelected in 1967. Resigned to become a member of the Kentucky State Parole Board.	1964–1972
Roy R. Ross (Paintsville)	Democratic	January 1, 1972 – January 1, 1976	Elected in 1971. Lost renomination.	1972–1974
Roy R. Ross (Paintsville)	Democratic	January 1, 1972 – January 1, 1976	Elected in 1971. Lost renomination.	1974–1984
Lowell Hughes (Ashland)	Democratic	January 1, 1976 – February 1, 1983	Elected in 1975. Reelected in 1979. Resigned to move to Florida.	1974–1984
David LeMaster (Paintsville)	Democratic	January 1, 1984 – January 28, 1994	Elected in 1983. Reelected in 1988. Reelected in 1992. Resigned.	1984–1993; Boyd, Floyd (part), Johnson, and Lawrence Counties.
David LeMaster (Paintsville)	Democratic	January 1, 1984 – January 28, 1994	Elected in 1983. Reelected in 1988. Reelected in 1992. Resigned.	1993–1997
John David Preston (Paintsville)	Republican	March 10, 1994 – January 1, 1997	Elected to finish LeMaster's term. Redistricted to the 29th district and lost reelection.	1993–1997
Robert Stivers (Manchester)	Republican	January 1, 1997 – present	Elected in 1996. Reelected in 2000. Reelected in 2004. Reelected in 2008. Reelected in 2012. Reelected in 2016. Reelected in 2020. Reelected in 2024.	1997–2003
Robert Stivers (Manchester)	Republican	January 1, 1997 – present	Elected in 1996. Reelected in 2000. Reelected in 2004. Reelected in 2008. Reelected in 2012. Reelected in 2016. Reelected in 2020. Reelected in 2024.	2003–2015
Robert Stivers (Manchester)	Republican	January 1, 1997 – present	Elected in 1996. Reelected in 2000. Reelected in 2004. Reelected in 2008. Reelected in 2012. Reelected in 2016. Reelected in 2020. Reelected in 2024.	2015–2023
Robert Stivers (Manchester)	Republican	January 1, 1997 – present	Elected in 1996. Reelected in 2000. Reelected in 2004. Reelected in 2008. Reelected in 2012. Reelected in 2016. Reelected in 2020. Reelected in 2024.	2023–present
