= John D. Minton Jr. =

American judge

John Minton

Chief Justice of the Kentucky Supreme Court
- In office June 27, 2008 – January 2, 2023
- Preceded by: Joseph Lambert
- Succeeded by: Laurance B. VanMeter

Justice of the Kentucky Supreme Court
- In office July 24, 2006 – January 2, 2023
- Preceded by: William Cooper
- Succeeded by: Kelly Thompson

Personal details
- Born: March 19, 1952 (age 73) Fort Lauderdale, Florida, U.S.
- Education: Western Kentucky University (BA); University of Kentucky (JD)

John D. Minton Jr. (born March 19, 1952, in Fort Lauderdale, Florida) is an American lawyer who served as the chief justice of the Kentucky Supreme Court from 2008 to 2023. Minton was elected to the Supreme Court on July 24, 2006, to fill a vacancy created by Justice William Cooper, who retired on June 30, 2006. On the retirement of Chief Justice Joseph E. Lambert, Minton was elected by his fellow justices to replace him. He was sworn in as chief justice on June 27, 2008.

== Education and career ==
Minton earned his bachelor's degree—with honors in history and English—from Western Kentucky University in 1974. He earned his juris doctor from the University of Kentucky College of Law in 1977.

Prior to his election to the Kentucky Supreme Court, Minton served as an appellate judge for the Kentucky Court of Appeals, representing the 2nd Appellate District. He was elected to the Court of Appeals in November 2003, and served there until his election to the Supreme Court in July 2006. From 1996 until his appointment to the Kentucky Court of Appeals in 2003, Minton also served as a circuit judge for Kentucky's 8th Judicial Circuit, which encompasses Warren County. During the same time, and by special appointment of Chief Justice Lambert, Minton also served as chief regional judge for the Green River Region, a 21-county area.

Before his election to the Circuit Court Bench, Minton practiced law in Bowling Green, KY for nearly 15 years.

== Honors ==
While serving on the Circuit Court Bench, Minton was recognized by the Kentucky Court of Justice for his leadership in forming the Warren County Drug Court, as well as for his commitment to law-related education programs. In 2003, the Kentucky Bar Association honored him with its Outstanding Judge Award. He is also a graduate of the National Judicial College.

== Personal life ==
Minton is the son of Dr. and Mrs. John D. Minton. At a young age, Minton and his parents moved from Cadiz, KY to Bowling Green, KY, where he was raised and still resides. Minton is married to the former Susan Lenell Page, also a native of Bowling Green. They have two children: a daughter, Page Sullivan Minton, and a son, John D. Minton III. Minton's father, Dr. John D. Minton Sr., served as a history professor at Western Kentucky University and, much later, as the university's fifth president.

Minton is a member of Bowling Green's Broadway United Methodist Church and a former lay leader for the Kentucky Conference of The United Methodist Church. He currently serves on the board of the Student Life Foundation at Western Kentucky University. He is also a member and past president of the Bowling Green Rotary Club and a former member of the board of directors of Shakertown at South Union.

Legal offices
Preceded by William Cooper	Justice of the Kentucky Supreme Court; 2006–2023	Succeeded by Kelly Thompson
Preceded by Joseph Lambert	Chief Justice of the Kentucky Supreme Court; 2008–2023	Succeeded by Laurance B. VanMeter
