= Debra H. Lambert =

American judge

Debra Lambert

Chief Justice of the Kentucky Supreme Court
- Incumbent
- Assumed office January 6, 2025
- Preceded by: Laurance B. VanMeter

Justice of the Kentucky Supreme Court
- Incumbent
- Assumed office January 7, 2019
- Preceded by: Daniel J. Venters

Judge of the Kentucky Court of Appeals
- In office January 5, 2015 – January 7, 2019
- Preceded by: Michael Caperton
- Succeeded by: Jonathan Spalding

Judge of the 28th Kentucky Circuit Court
- In office September 1, 1999 – January 1, 2007
- Preceded by: Circuit created by 1998 Ky. Acts ch. 517
- Succeeded by: Walter F. Maguire

Personal details
- Born: 1961 or 1962 (age 64–65)
- Spouse(s): Joseph Sharpe; Joseph Lambert (divorced)
- Education: Eastern Kentucky University (BA); University of Kentucky (JD)

Debra Hembree Lambert (born 1961 or 1962) is an American lawyer who has served as the chief justice of the Kentucky Supreme Court since 2025; serving concurrently as a justice since 2019. She previously served as a judge of the Kentucky Court of Appeals from 2015 to 2018.

== Education ==
Lambert received her bachelor's degree from Eastern Kentucky University in 1983 and her Juris Doctor from the University of Kentucky College of Law in 1989.

== Career ==
Lambert practiced law in Mount Vernon, Kentucky. During that time, she also served as an assistant commonwealth's attorney and city attorney for the City of Mount Vernon.

=== State judicial career ===
In 1999, then-Governor Paul E. Patton appointed her to serve as circuit judge of the Family Court Division in the 28th Judicial Circuit. In 2007, Judge Lambert resumed her private practice of law in Mount Vernon until her election to the Court of Appeals in 2014.

=== Kentucky Supreme Court ===
On August 25, 2017, she made it known that she planned to run for the seat being vacated by Daniel J. Venters. She filed to run on February 1, 2018. She easily won the top-two primary in May 2018, with her and her nearest opponent Daniel Ballou advancing to the general election. On November 6, 2018, she received 66.63% of the vote to Ballou's 33.37%. She assumed office on January 7, 2019. On September 19, 2024, she was elected by her colleagues as the next chief justice. Her term began on January 6, 2025.

== Electoral history ==
=== 2000 ===
2000 28th Kentucky Circuit Family Court, 3rd division special election
Party	Candidate	Votes	%
Nonpartisan	Debra Hembree Lambert (incumbent)	18,664	68.4
Nonpartisan	Michael Louis Duncan	8,637	31.6
Total votes		27,301	100.0

=== 2006 ===
2006 28th Kentucky Circuit Family Court, 3rd division election
Party	Candidate	Votes	%
Nonpartisan	Walter F. Maguire	15,985	60.6
Nonpartisan	Debra Hembree Lambert (incumbent)	10,398	39.4
Total votes		26,383	100.0

=== 2014 ===
2014 Kentucky Court of Appeals 3rd district, 1st division election
Party	Candidate	Votes	%
Nonpartisan	Debra Hembree Lambert	74,866	53.4
Nonpartisan	Michael O. Caperton (incumbent)	65,243	46.6
Total votes		140,109	100.0

=== 2018 ===
2018 Kentucky Supreme Court 3rd district election
Party	Candidate	Votes	%
Nonpartisan	Debra Hembree Lambert	95,237	65.1
Nonpartisan	Dan Ballou	51,075	34.9
Total votes		146,312	100.0

Legal offices
Preceded by Daniel J. Venters	Justice of the Kentucky Supreme Court; 2019–present	Incumbent
Preceded by Laurance B. VanMeter	Chief Justice of the Kentucky Supreme Court; 2025–present	Incumbent
