= Robert Stivers =

American politician (born 1961)

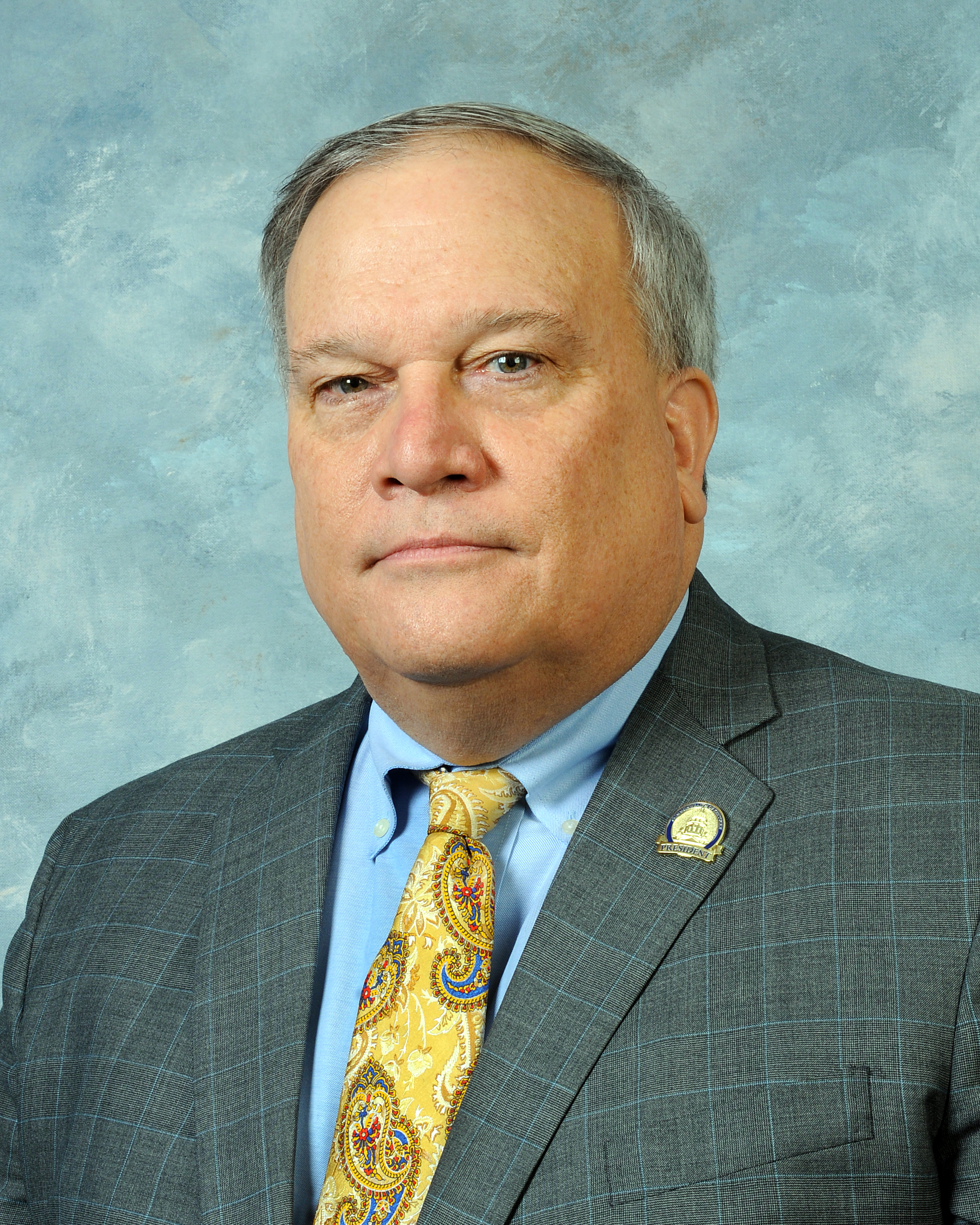
- Official portrait, 2021

President of the Kentucky Senate
- Incumbent
- Assumed office January 8, 2013
- Preceded by: David Williams

Majority Leader of the Kentucky Senate
- In office October 23, 2009 – January 8, 2013
- Whip: Carroll Gibson
- Preceded by: Dan Kelly
- Succeeded by: Damon Thayer

Member of the Kentucky Senate from the 25th district
- Incumbent
- Assumed office January 1, 1997
- Preceded by: John David Preston (redistricting)

Personal details
- Born: Bertram Robert Stivers II; December 24, 1961 (age 64) London, Kentucky, U.S.
- Party: Republican
- Spouse: Regina Stivers
- Education: University of Kentucky (BS); University of Louisville (JD)

Bertram Robert Stivers II (born December 24, 1961) is an American attorney and politician who has served as president of the Kentucky Senate since 2013. A member of the Republican Party, he has served as a member of the Kentucky Senate representing Kentucky's 25th Senate district since 1997.

He is the longest-serving senate president in the commonwealth's history.

== Early life and education ==
Bertram Robert Stivers II was born on December 24, 1961, to Bertram and Joan (Koch) Stivers. His father was an attorney, politician, and World War II veteran who served as an Assistant United States Attorney for the Eastern District of Kentucky prior to being elected circuit court judge of Kentucky's 27th judicial circuit in 1963 and commonwealth attorney for Kentucky's 41st judicial circuit in 1987. His mother was a graduate of Harvard University who served in various teaching and administrative roles at Sue Bennett College, including president from 1988 to 1991.

Stivers was raised in London, Kentucky, and graduated from Laurel County High School in 1980. Afterwards, he intended to pursue a career as an architect and enrolled in the University of Kentucky. However, after graduating with a Bachelor of Science degree in industrial management and a minor in economics, Stivers instead chose to attend the Louis D. Brandeis School of Law at the University of Louisville, where he graduated with a Juris Doctor degree.

== Political career ==
=== Commonwealth attorney's office (1989–1993) ===
Beginning in 1989, Stivers worked as an assistant commonwealth attorney under his father. After his father chose not to seek reelection in 1993, he ran for commonwealth attorney but was defeated in the Republican primary.

=== State Senator (1997–present) ===
In 1996, Kentucky's 25th Senate district seat was left open by the redistricting of incumbent John David Preston into the 29th Senate district. Stivers was unopposed in the Republican primary, and won the 1996 Kentucky Senate election for the seat with 14,027 votes (52.7%) against Democratic nominee Charles Derrickson.

During his tenure, Stivers has described himself as a "center-right" figure with a particular focus on economic development. A "Hal Rogers Republican," he has pushed for increased tax incentives to encourage businesses to move to Kentucky and the deregulation of industries already in the state.

==== Majority leader ====
In October 2009, Republican Majority Leader Dan Kelly resigned from the senate due to his appointment as circuit judge of Kentucky's 11th Judicial district by Governor Steve Beshear. Stivers was selected to succeed Kelly as majority leader that same month, beating future majority leader Damon Thayer in a caucus election It was during this period that, according to Senate President David L. Williams, Stivers attempted to oust him from his position due to Williams' poor relationship with Beshear. Stivers denied this ever took place, but clarified that he believed Williams was, "...to a point that he was just really bitter and tired of the place." When Williams resigned in November 2012 to accept an appointment as a circuit judge of Kentucky's 40th Judicial district, Stivers was selected by the Republican caucus to replace him as president.

==== Senate president ====
In contrast to Williams, Stivers described his relationship with Beshear as, "very good, very honorable and honest." However, the same could not be said for Stivers' relationships with the subsequent two administrations.

Stivers was an early opponent of Matt Bevin, denouncing his 2014 primary challenge of Mitch McConnell. After his 2015 election as governor, Bevin and Stivers continued to clash over issues such as Bevin's veto of the 2018 biannual state budget and veto of a public pension reform bill in 2019. Stivers strongly condemned and called for a federal investigation to be made regarding the hundreds of pardons Bevin issued during his final days in office.

The administration of Andy Beshear has seen similar clashes, despite Stivers early desire to have a strong working relationship with the governor much like what he had with his father. Stivers believed the turning point was Beshear's request for the general assembly to adjourn sine die early due to the onset of the COVID-19 pandemic in March 2020. Stivers and House Speaker David W. Osborne said they would agree to this request if Beshear would agree to call the legislature back into a special session that year; Beshear denied this request. Since then, while Stivers and Beshear have had interests aligned over economic and workforce projects, the Republican supermajorities in both chambers have stripped the executive branch of many of its powers and overridden nearly all of Beshear's vetos.

With the retirement of long-time senator Mitch McConnell in 2026, Stivers has been mentioned by some to be the possible next de facto head of the Kentucky Republican Party.

== Personal life ==
Stivers resides in Manchester alongside his wife, Regina, where he owns a private law practice. Regina served as deputy and interim secretary of the Kentucky Tourism, Arts, and Heritage Cabinet during the Bevin administration.

Kentucky Senate
Preceded by Dan Kelly	Majority Leader of the Kentucky Senate; 2009–2013	Succeeded by Damon Thayer
Political offices
Preceded by David Williams	President of the Kentucky Senate; 2013–present	Incumbent
