= David LeMaster =

American politician

Member of the Kentucky Senate from the 25th district
- In office January 1, 1984 – January 28, 1994
- Preceded by: Lowell Hughes
- Succeeded by: John David Preston

Personal details
- Born: May 1, 1949
- Died: May 16, 2022 (aged 73)
- Party: Democratic

Arthur David LeMaster (May 1, 1949 – May 16, 2022) was an American politician from Kentucky who was a member of the Kentucky Senate from 1984 to 1994. LeMaster was first elected in 1983 after incumbent senator Lowell Hughes resigned. He resigned from the senate in January 1994 after being convicted for lying to the FBI.

He died in May 2022 at age 73.
