= Irv Maze =

American lawyer (born 1958)

Irvin Maze

Judge of the Kentucky Court of Appeals
- In office April 27, 2012 – January 2, 2023
- Preceded by: Tom Wine
- Succeeded by: Audra Jean Eckerle

Judge of the 30th Kentucky Circuit Court
- In office August 14, 2008 – April 27, 2012
- Preceded by: Kathleen Voor Montano
- Succeeded by: Angela McCormick Bisig

Jefferson County Attorney
- In office January 4, 1999 – August 14, 2008
- Preceded by: Mike Conliffe
- Succeeded by: Mike O'Connell

Member of the Jefferson County Commission from District B
- In office January 8, 1985 – January 4, 1999
- Preceded by: Jim Malone
- Succeeded by: Joe Corradino

Personal details
- Born: 1958 (age 67–68) Louisville, Kentucky, U.S.
- Party: Democratic
- Spouse: Peggy Maze
- Children: 5
- Education: Indiana University Bloomington (BA); University of Louisville (JD)

Irvin G. "Irv" Maze is an American lawyer who served as a judge of the Kentucky Court of Appeals from 2012 to 2023. He is a former circuit court judge in Jefferson County, Kentucky (Louisville) and previously elected to three terms as county attorney for Jefferson County.

Maze graduated from Indiana University Bloomington in 1972, and University of Louisville Brandeis School of Law in 1975. He and his wife Peggy have 5 children.

Prior to being elected Jefferson County Attorney, Maze was elected to multiple terms to the Jefferson County Fiscal Court before Louisville and Jefferson County were merged in 2002.

In winning his first term as Jefferson County Attorney, Maze defeated Republican nominee Steve Pence, who later served as Lieutenant Governor of Kentucky (2003–07).

In 2007, Maze ran for Lieutenant Governor of Kentucky as the running mate of Jonathan Miller; however, they dropped out of the race prior to the primary election, and endorsed eventual general election winner Steve Beshear.

Maze won re-election to a third term as Jefferson County Attorney in 2006. In 2008 he was appointed to a vacant judgeship on the Jefferson County Circuit Court. In 2012, Maze was appointed to the Kentucky Court of Appeals.

== See also ==
- Kentucky gubernatorial election, 2007
