= Lowell Hughes =

American politician

Member of the Kentucky Senate from the 25th district
- In office January 1, 1976 – February 1, 1983
- Preceded by: Roy R. Ross
- Succeeded by: David LeMaster

Personal details
- Born: 1938
- Died: September 8, 2019 (aged 81)
- Party: Democratic

Lowell T. Hughes (1938 – September 8, 2019) was an American politician from Kentucky who was a member of the Kentucky Senate from 1976 to 1983. Hughes was first elected in 1975, defeating incumbent Democratic senator Roy R. Ross for renomination. He resigned from the senate in February 1983 before moving to Florida.

He died in September 2019 at age 81.
