= John Calvin Aker =

American judge (1939–2000)

Justice of the Kentucky Supreme Court
- In office January 1, 1979 – March 1986
- Preceded by: Pleas Jones
- Succeeded by: John D. White

Personal details
- Born: June 3, 1939
- Died: March 2, 2000 (aged 60)
- Profession: Lawyer, judge

John Calvin Aker (June 3, 1939 – March 2, 2000) was a justice of the Kentucky Supreme Court from 1979 to 1986.

== Career ==
Aker was an attorney in Somerset, Kentucky who served as Assistant Commonwealth's Attorney, a District Judge of the 28th Judicial District covering Pulaski and Rockcastle counties, and a justice of the Kentucky Supreme Court. Aker was appointed to the Kentucky Ethics Panel by Governor Martha Layne Collins.

Political offices
Preceded by Pleas Jones	Justice of the Kentucky Supreme Court; 1979–1986	Succeeded by John D. White
