= Courts of Kentucky =

Courts of Kentucky include:

Kentucky Court of Justice

Under an amendment to the Kentucky Constitution passed by the state's voters in 1975, judicial power in Kentucky is "vested exclusively in one Court of Justice", divided into the following:

- Kentucky Supreme Court
  - Kentucky Court of Appeals
    - Kentucky Circuit Courts (57 circuits)
      - Kentucky District Courts (59 judicial districts)

Federal courts located in this state

- United States District Court for the Eastern District of Kentucky
- United States District Court for the Western District of Kentucky

Former federal courts of Kentucky

- United States District Court for the District of Kentucky (extinct, subdivided)
