= Joseph Lambert (judge) =

American judge (born 1948)

Chief Justice of the Kentucky Supreme Court
- In office October 5, 1998 – June 27, 2008
- Preceded by: Robert F. Stephens
- Succeeded by: John D. Minton Jr.

Justice of the Kentucky Supreme Court
- In office January 5, 1987 – June 27, 2008
- Preceded by: John D. White
- Succeeded by: Daniel J. Venters

Personal details
- Born: May 23, 1948 (age 78) Berea, Kentucky, U.S.
- Spouse: Debra H. Lambert (divorced)
- Education: Georgetown College; University of Louisville School of Law

Joseph Earl Lambert (born May 23, 1948) is an American attorney and jurist who served as a member of the Kentucky Supreme Court from 1987 to 2008. He served as chief justice of the court from 1998 to 2008.

== Biography ==
Born in Berea, Kentucky, Lambert received a Bachelor of Science degree from Georgetown College in 1970, where he was a member of the Lambda Chi Alpha fraternity. From 1970 to 1971, he was a staffer to Senator John Sherman Cooper. He received a Juris Doctor from the University of Louisville School of Law in 1974, and thereafter served as a law clerk for Rhodes Bratcher of the United States District Court for the Eastern District of Kentucky in Louisville. Lambert entered private practice in Mount Vernon, Kentucky in 1975.

Lambert was first elected to the Kentucky Supreme Court in November 1986, representing Kentucky's 3rd Supreme Court district, and was sworn into office on January 5, 1987. On October 5, 1998, he became chief justice. He served on the court until 2008.

His ex-wife, Debra H. Lambert, has served as a member of the Kentucky Supreme Court since 2019, and as chief justice since 2025.
