= Constitution of Kentucky =

American state constitution

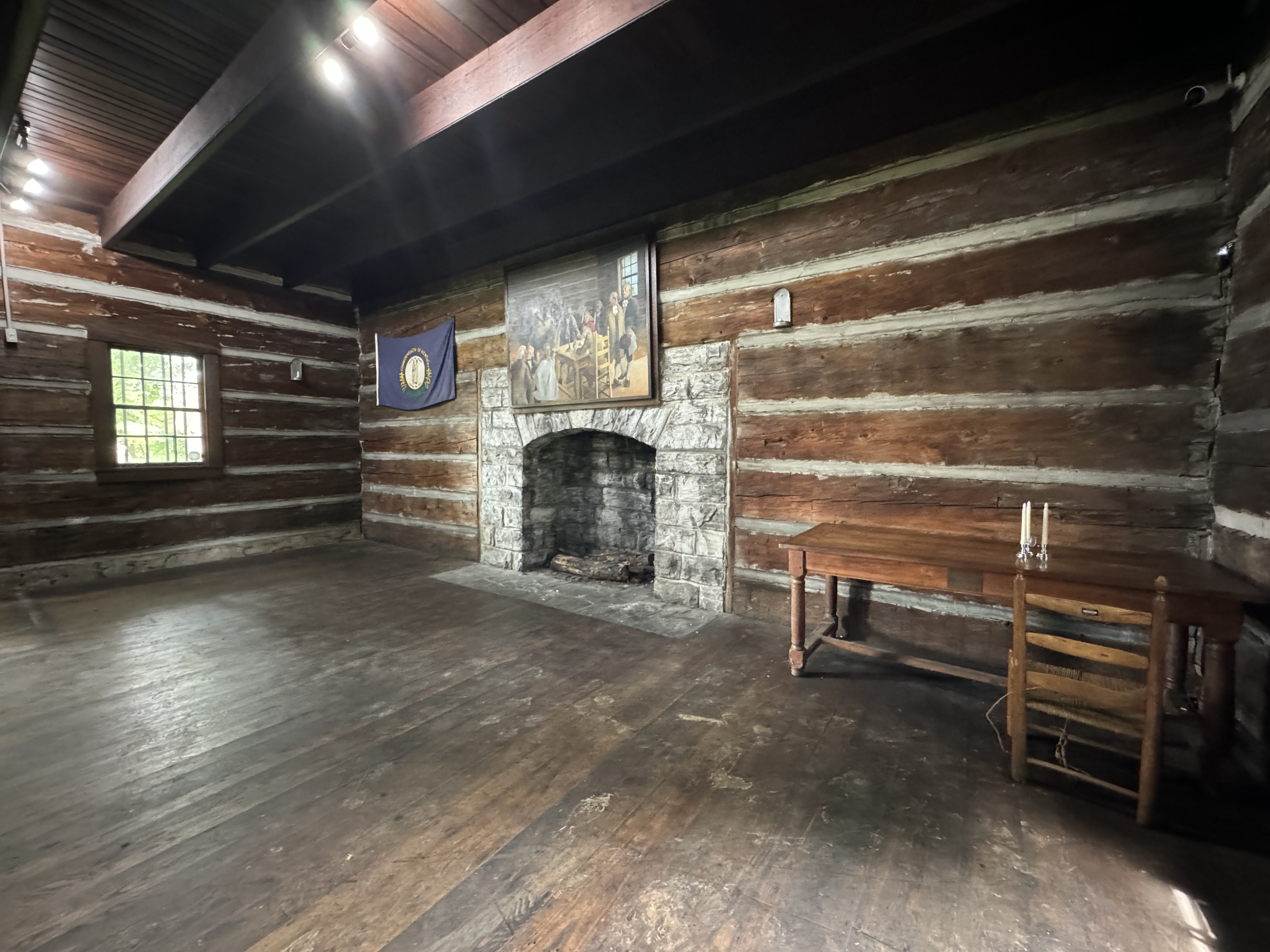
A replica of the courthouse where the first Constitutional Convention was held in Danville, Kentucky in 1784.

The Constitution of the Commonwealth of Kentucky is the document that governs the Commonwealth of Kentucky. It was first adopted in 1792 and has since been rewritten three times and amended many more. The later versions were adopted in 1799, 1850, and 1891.

== The 1792 Constitution ==
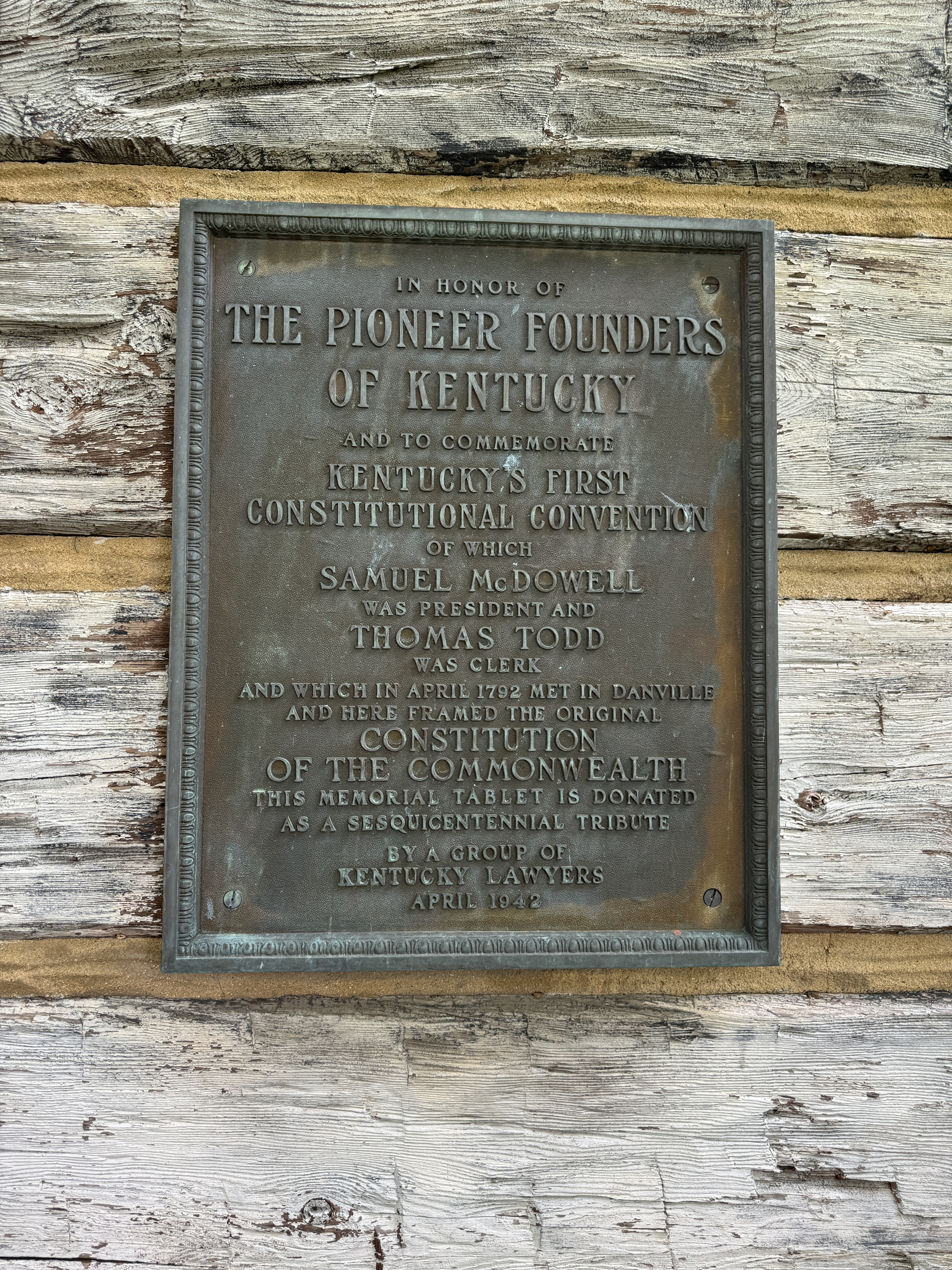
A plaque commemorating the first Constitutional Convention in Danville, Kentucky in 1784.

The first constitutional convention of Kentucky was called by Colonel Benjamin Logan on December 27, 1784, in Danville, the seat of Lincoln County, Virginia. Over the next eight years, ten constitutional conventions were called, each making some progress toward a viable constitution. The state's first constitution was accepted by the United States Congress on June 1, 1792, making Kentucky the fifteenth state.

The 1792 Constitution had several similarities to the United States Constitution in that it provided for three branches of government – legislative, executive, and judicial – and a bicameral legislature called the General Assembly. The document contained a bill of rights, and called for an electoral college to elect senators and the state's governor. (Representatives were chosen by popular election.)

Some relatively new ideas were included in the 1792 Constitution. One was the stipulation that the General Assembly vote by ballot instead of voice. There was also a requirement that representation to the General Assembly be based on population, not geography.

The 1792 Constitution was seen as an experiment, and it called for a re-evaluation of the document at the end of the century.

== The 1799 Constitution ==
A second constitutional convention was called for by the voters of Kentucky in 1799. The 1799 Constitution abolished the electoral college, allowing senators, representatives, the governor, and the newly created office of lieutenant governor to be directly elected. In addition to appointing judges, the governor was given the power to appoint a number of local offices including sheriffs, coroners, and justices of the peace. While expanding the governor's power, the 1799 Constitution also placed term limits on the governor, stipulating that a governor could not succeed himself in office for a period of seven years. Membership in both houses of the General Assembly was also limited.

In some ways, the 1799 Constitution was a regression. The progressive idea of voting by ballot in the General Assembly was removed. Neither of the first two Kentucky constitutions provided a method of amendment, and the 1799 Constitution made it even more difficult to call a constitutional convention.

The 1799 Constitution went beyond the pro-slavery provisions of the original constitution by disenfranchising free black citizens, mixed-race persons, and Indians.

== The 1850 Constitution ==
By 1828, some in the General Assembly began calling for a new constitutional convention. However, because the 1799 Constitution made the calling of a convention such an arduous task, it took more than twenty years to call the convention, which finally convened in Frankfort on October 1, 1849.

One major item of dissatisfaction with the 1799 Constitution was the appointment of so many officials by the governor. This was addressed in the 1850 Constitution by making all state officials, even judges, popularly elected and imposing term limits on these offices.

While the Kentucky Constitution had always provided for protection of slave property, pro-slavery forces sought and received even greater protections in the 1850 Constitution. Among the new provisions were a requirement that slaves and their offspring remain in the state, and that ministers of religion – thought to be largely anti-slavery – were prohibited from holding the office of governor or seats in the General Assembly.

The bulk of the reforms in the 1850 Constitution, however, were reserved for the General Assembly, whose spending had exceeded incoming revenue. Membership in the Senate was fixed at 38; in the House the number was fixed at 100. Sessions of the General Assembly were limited to sixty days biennially, requiring a two-thirds majority to extend them.

The 1850 Constitution also created a sinking fund for the liquidation of the state's debt, which had climbed to $4.5 million. To prevent the debt from climbing too high in the future, the 1850 Constitution mandated a maximum of $500,000 of indebtedness for the state. At the time, this represented about a year's worth of revenue for the state, but this provision remains in the current Kentucky Constitution, even though receipts in the 2001-02 fiscal year were approximately $6.5 billion.

Another dated provision of the 1850 Constitution that survives in the present Constitution is the ineligibility for public office of anyone who had participated in a duel since the ratification of the 1850 Constitution. While the relevance of this prohibition may be disputed now, it could potentially have derailed Governor William Goebel's eligibility for public office in the 1890s.

== The 1891 Constitution ==
Ratification of the Thirteenth, Fourteenth, and Fifteenth Amendments to the U.S. Constitution following the Civil War provided the impetus for another constitutional convention, since much of the existing constitution provided protection for slave property and was now at odds with the Federal Constitution. However, this required a majority of the voters in the previous two elections to vote in favor of a convention, a measure that failed every two years from 1873 to 1885, finally receiving the necessary majority in 1888 and 1889 after the General Assembly called for a registration of all eligible voters in 1887. The convention began September 8, 1890.

For the first time, ratification of the constitution required a referendum of the citizens. At the same time, the 1891 Constitution did little to ameliorate the difficult process of calling a constitutional convention. This resulted in failed calls for subsequent constitutional conventions in 1931, 1947, 1960, and 1977. The 1891 Convention did, for the first time, provide a means of amending itself that has been used by the General Assembly to keep a century-old document somewhat current.

Judicial decisions have also helped to adapt the current constitution to modern times. For example, the 1891 Constitution limited state officials' salaries to $5,000. A 1949 Amendment raised this number to $12,000, but difficulty of keeping the number up-to-date quickly became apparent. The 1962 Kentucky Supreme Court case Matthews v. Allen addressed this problem by opining that the only way to keep circuit judge's salaries adequate, as required by Section 133 of the constitution, was to allow the General Assembly to adjust the $12,000 figure in Section 246 to account for the value of a dollar in 1949.

Despite some provisions that some claim are antiquated, the 1891 Constitution (as amended) remains the constitution that governs the Commonwealth today.

== Notable amendments ==
=== 1992 ===
Several amendments to the Kentucky Constitution were enacted in 1992. One important amendment lifted the restriction that the Governor could not succeed himself or herself in office. Per the 1992 amendment, the incumbent can seek one additional term before becoming ineligible for four years. The amendment was drafted so that it did not apply to the then-current holder of the office (Brereton Jones), which meant that the first Governor to which the amendment applied was elected in 1995 (Paul Patton).

The 1992 amendments to Kentucky's Constitution significantly changed the office of Lieutenant Governor. Previously, the Lieutenant Governor became acting Governor whenever the Governor was out of state. Since the amendments took effect, the Lieutenant Governor only takes over gubernatorial powers when the Governor is incapacitated.

The amendments also removed the Lieutenant Governor's duties in the Senate — previously, the Lieutenant Governor had cast the tie breaking vote in the Senate.

Finally, the amendments allow candidates for Governor and Lieutenant Governor to run on a single ticket. Prior to the amendments, the two offices were sometimes inhabited by members of different parties.

See also Lieutenant Governor of Kentucky

=== 1996 ===
In 1996, Sections 180 and 187 of Kentucky's Constitution were amended to remove language that allowed local governments to levy a poll tax on each person residing within the county or the city, and to remove language requiring that separate schools for "white" and "colored" children be maintained.

=== 2004 ===
In 2004, Kentucky became the fourth state to send a constitutional amendment banning same-sex unions to the state's voters. On Election Day of that year, Kentucky joined 10 other states in passing such an amendment, with voters passing it by a 3-to-1 margin. The text of the amendment reads:

Only a marriage between one man and one woman shall be valid or recognized as a marriage in Kentucky. A legal status identical or substantially similar to that of marriage for unmarried individuals shall not be valid or recognized.

This provision became void in 2015 when the U.S. Supreme Court ruled in Obergefell v. Hodges that the fundamental right to marry is guaranteed to same-sex couples by both the Due Process Clause and the Equal Protection Clause of the Fourteenth Amendment to the United States Constitution.
