= Kentucky District Courts =

The Kentucky District Courts are the state courts of limited jurisdiction in the U.S. state of Kentucky.

== Jurisdiction and bench ==
The District Courts are trial courts of limited jurisdiction that hear misdemeanor criminal cases, traffic violations, violations of county and municipal ordinances and small claims. They also have concurrent jurisdiction with the family court division of the Circuit Court over proceedings involving domestic violence and abuse, the Uniform Parentage Act and Uniform Interstate Family Support Act, dependency, child abuse and neglect, and juvenile status offenses.

Appeals from decisions of the District Courts are made to the corresponding Circuit Court for that particular district. Further appeals can be made on a discretionary basis to the Kentucky Court of Appeals as well as the Kentucky Supreme Court.

== Districts ==
Current districts of the district courts.

Number of judges in each district. 1 2 3 5 17

1. First District – Ballard, Carlisle, Fulton, and Hickman counties
2. Second District – McCracken county
3. Third District – Christian county
4. Fourth District – Hopkins county
5. Fifth District – Crittenden, Webster, and Union counties
6. Sixth District – Daviess county
7. Seventh District – Logan and Todd counties
8. Eighth District – Warren county
9. Ninth District – Hardin county
10. Tenth District – Hart and LaRue counties
11. Eleventh District – Green, Marion, Taylor, and Washington counties
12. Twelfth District – Henry, Oldham, and Trimble counties
13. Thirteenth District - Garrard, Jessamine, and Lincoln counties
14. Fourteenth District - Bourbon, Scott, and Woodford counties
15. Fifteenth District - Carroll, Grant, and Owen counties
16. Sixteenth District - Kenton county
17. Seventeenth District - Campbell county
18. Eighteenth District - Harrison, Nicholas, Pendleton, and Robertson counties
19. Nineteenth District - Bracken, Fleming, and Mason counties
20. Twentieth District - Greenup and Lewis counties
21. Twenty-first District - Bath, Menifee, Montgomery, and Rowan counties
22. Twenty-second District - Fayette county
23. Twenty-third District - Estill, Lee, and Owsley counties
24. Twenty-fourth District - Johnson, Lawrence, and Martin counties
25. Twenty-fifth District - Clark and Madison counties
26. Twenty-sixth District - Harlan county
27. Twenty-seventh District - Knox and Laurel counties
28. Twenty-eighth District - Pulaski and Rockcastle counties
29. Twenty-ninth District - Adair and Casey counties
30. Thirtieth District - Jefferson county
31. Thirty-first District - Floyd county
32. Thirty-second District - Boyd county
33. Thirty-third District - Perry county
34. Thirty-fourth District - McCreary and Whitley counties
35. Thirty-fifth District - Pike county
36. Thirty-sixth District - Knott and Magoffin counties
37. Thirty-seventh District - Carter, Elliott, and Morgan counties
38. Thirty-eighth District - Butler, Edmonson, Hancock, and Ohio counties
39. Thirty-ninth District - Breathitt, Powell, and Wolfe counties
40. Fortieth District - Clinton, Russell, and Wayne counties
41. Forty-first District - Clay, Jackson, and Leslie counties
42. Forty-second District - Calloway county
43. Forty-third District - Barren and Metcalfe counties
44. Forty-fourth District - Bell county
45. Forty-fifth District - McLean and Muhlenberg counties
46. Forty-sixth District - Breckinridge, Grayson, and Meade counties
47. Forty-seventh District - Letcher county
48. Forty-eighth District - Franklin county
49. Forty-ninth District - Allen and Simpson counties
50. Fiftieth District - Boyle and Mercer counties
51. Fifty-first District - Henderson county
52. Fifty-second District - Graves county
53. Fifty-third District - Anderson, Shelby, and Spencer counties
54. Fifty-fourth District - Boone and Gallatin counties
55. Fifty-fifth District - Bullitt county
56. Fifty-sixth District - Caldwell, Livingston, Lyon, and Trigg counties
57. Fifty-seventh District - Nelson county
58. Fifty-eighth District - Marshall county
59. Fifty-ninth District - Cumberland and Monroe counties
