= Kentucky Court of Appeals =

Intermediate appellate court of Kentucky

- Established: 1792
- Jurisdiction: Kentucky, United States
- Location: Frankfort, Kentucky
- Composition method: Non-partisan election
- Authorized by: Kentucky Constitution
- Appeals to: Kentucky Supreme Court
- Number of positions: 14
- Website: Official Website

Chief Judge
- Currently: Larry E. Thompson
- Since: December 6, 2023

The Kentucky Court of Appeals is the intermediate court of Kentucky's two appellate courts, under the Kentucky Supreme Court. Prior to a 1975 amendment to the Kentucky Constitution, the Kentucky Court of Appeals was the court of last resort and only appellate court in Kentucky.

== History ==
Similar to the federal constitution, Kentucky's first constitution directly established the state's highest court while delegating the authority to establish lower courts to the legislature.

The Kentucky Court of Appeals remained the highest court in the state until 1975 when a constitutional amendment was passed by ballot referendum to reorganize reorganize Kentucky's judicial system. The Kentucky Supreme Court was formed and made the new highest court of the state while the Court of Appeals became the state's intermediate court on January 1, 1976.

In addition, the amendment made all judicial election's nonpartisan and abolished the office of Clerk of the Court of Appeals as a statewide elected constitutional office. The clerkship was the first elected office held by future governor Martha Layne Collins, who defeated future Kentucky Chief Justice Joseph Lambert in 1975. Collins was the last individual to be elected clerk, and subsequently the first to serve as clerk of the Kentucky Supreme Court.

== Function ==
The Kentucky Court of Appeals has a headquarters building and courtroom in Frankfort. Unlike the Kentucky Supreme Court however, the three-judge panels of the Kentucky Court of Appeals frequently hear cases in courthouses all over Kentucky.

The chief judge assigns judges and cases to panels. Membership of the panels rotate so that all judges sit on at least one panel with each of their colleagues in any given year. Usually one judge is chosen to author the majority opinion for each panel in a particular case.

The Kentucky Court of Appeals hears appeals from the Kentucky Circuit Courts, with the exception of criminal cases involving sentences of death, life imprisonment, or imprisonment of twenty years or more, in which appeals are taken directly to the Kentucky Supreme Court. In addition, original actions may be filed with the Kentucky Court of Appeals in certain situations.

== Judges ==
The Kentucky Court of Appeals is composed of 14 judges who serve eight year terms. Two judges are elected from each of the state's seven appellant districts which mirror the seven districts of the Kentucky Supreme Court. The current chief judge is Larry E. Thompson.

=== List of judges ===
Current districts of the Court of Appeals.

As of August 1, 2025:

District	Division	Name	Start
7th	2nd	Larry Thompson, Chief Judge	2019
1st	1st	Christopher McNeill, Deputy Chief Judge	2020
1st	2nd	Lisa Jones	2024
2nd	1st	Jeff Taylor	2003
2nd	2nd	Kelly Mark Easton	2023
3rd	1st	Jacqueline Caldwell	2019
3rd	2nd	James Lambert	2006
4th	1st	Audra Eckerle	2023
4th	2nd	Annette Karem	2023
5th	1st	Will Moynahan	2025
5th	2nd	Glenn Acree	2006
6th	1st	Allison Jones	2013
6th	2nd	Susanne Cetrulo	2021
7th	1st	Sara Walter Combs	1994

== See also ==
- Old Court-New Court controversy
- Courts of Kentucky
