= Kentucky Supreme Court =

Highest court in the U.S. state of Kentucky

- Interactive map of Kentucky Supreme Court
- Established: 1976
- Jurisdiction: Kentucky, United States
- Location: Frankfort, Kentucky
- Composition method: Non-partisan election
- Authorized by: Kentucky Constitution
- Appeals to: Supreme Court of the United States
- Number of positions: 7
- Website: Official Website

Chief Justice
- Currently: Debra H. Lambert
- Since: January 6, 2025

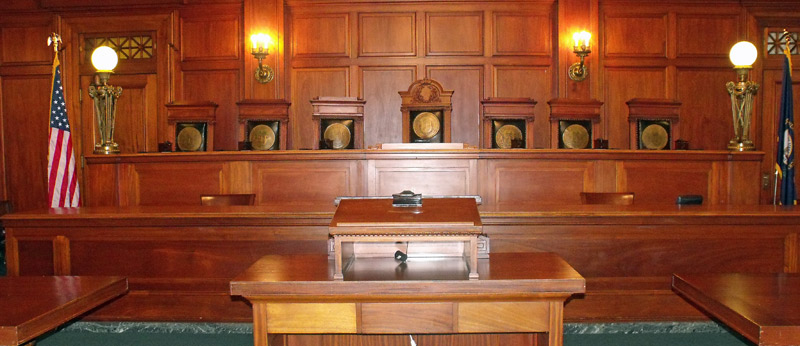
The chamber of the Kentucky Supreme Court in 2012.

The Kentucky Supreme Court is the state supreme court of the U.S. state of Kentucky. Prior to its creation by constitutional amendment in 1975, the Kentucky Court of Appeals was the only appellate court in Kentucky. The Kentucky Court of Appeals is now Kentucky's intermediate appellate court.

Criminal appeals involving a sentence of death, life imprisonment, or imprisonment of twenty years or more are heard directly by the Kentucky Supreme Court, bypassing the Kentucky Court of Appeals. All other cases are heard on a discretionary basis on appeal from the Kentucky Court of Appeals.

The Kentucky Supreme Court promulgates the Rules of Court and Rules of Evidence. Through two of its subagencies, the Kentucky Office of Bar Admissions (KYOBA) and Kentucky Bar Association (KBA), it is the final arbiter for bar admissions (KYOBA) and discipline (KBA).

In the event that two or more justices of the Kentucky Supreme Court recuse themselves from a case, the Governor of Kentucky appoints Special Justices to sit for that particular case.

The court meets in a courtroom located on the second floor of the Kentucky State Capitol in Frankfort. The second floor of the capitol building is also home to offices for the justices and Supreme Court personnel.

The Administrative Office of the Courts (AOC), under the aegis of the Kentucky Supreme Court, serves as the administrative support agency for Kentucky courts and Circuit Court Clerks. The role of the AOC is similar to that of the Legislative Research Commission (LRC) for the Kentucky General Assembly.

== Notable cases ==
In its short history, the Kentucky Supreme Court has not produced much jurisprudence of note. A study published in 2007 by the Supreme Court of California found that of all state supreme courts in the United States, the decisions of the Kentucky Supreme Court were the least followed by other states' appellate courts.

Notable decisions of the Kentucky Supreme Court include Kentucky v. Wasson, 842 S.W.2d 487 (Ky. 1992), in which the court invalidated the criminalization of same-sex sodomy as a state equal protection violation. This Kentucky decision, based on the Kentucky constitution, was made at a time when the applicable federal equal protection precedent was Bowers v. Hardwick, 478 U.S. 186 (1986), which held that federal constitutional protection of the right of privacy was not implicated in laws penalizing homosexual sodomy. In 2003, the United States Supreme Court reversed itself and overturned Bowers, issuing a decision in Lawrence v. Texas, 539 U.S. 558 (2003) that mirrored Kentucky's Wasson ruling.

In Cameron v EMW Women's Surgical Center et al. (2023), the court upheld Kentucky's total abortion ban by holding that abortion providers lack standing to challenge the statutes on behalf of their patients. The court did not rule on the constitutionality of the ban.

== Current justices ==
Current districts of the Supreme Court

Justices are elected in nonpartisan elections to eight-year terms. In case of a vacancy the governor makes an appointment from a list of three names provided by the Kentucky Judicial Nominating Commission.

District	Name	Born	Start	Term ends	Elected	Law school
3rd	Debra H. Lambert, Chief Justice	1961 or 1962 (age 64–65)	January 7, 2019	2034	2018; 2026	Kentucky
7th	Robert B. Conley, Deputy Chief Justice	July 19, 1958 (age 68)	January 4, 2021	2028	2020	Northern Kentucky
6th	Michelle M. Keller	1960 (age 65–66)	April 3, 2013	2030	2014 (Note: Keller was first appointed to the court in 2013 by governor Steve Beshear before winning a full term in 2014.); 2022	Northern Kentucky
1st	Christopher Shea Nickell	1958 or 1959 (age 66–67)	December 11, 2019	2030	2019 (special); 2022	Kentucky
2nd	Kelly Thompson	1947 or 1948 (age 77–78)	January 2, 2023	2030	2022	Kentucky
4th	Angela McCormick Bisig	1964 or 1965 (age 60–61)	January 2, 2023	2030	2022	Louisville
5th	Pamela R. Goodwine	1959 or 1960 (age 66–67)	January 6, 2025	2032	2024	Kentucky

== See also ==
- Courts of Kentucky
