= Kentucky Circuit Courts =

The Kentucky Circuit Courts are the state courts of general jurisdiction in the U.S. state of Kentucky.

== Jurisdiction and bench ==
The Circuit Courts are trial courts with original jurisdiction in cases involving capital offenses and other felonies; land disputes; contested probates of wills; and civil lawsuits in disputes with an amount in controversy over $5,000. Circuit courts also have the power to issue injunctions, writs of prohibition, writs of mandamus, and appeals from the decisions of administrative agencies.

Circuit Courts also hear appeals from the District Courts, which in Kentucky are courts of limited jurisdiction that hear misdemeanor criminal cases, traffic violations, violations of county and municipal ordinances and small claims.

The family court division of Circuit Court has original jurisdiction in cases involving dissolution of marriage (divorce), child custody, visitation, maintenance and support (alimony and child support), equitable distribution of property in dissolution cases; adoption, and termination of parental rights. The family court division has concurrent jurisdiction with the District Court over proceedings involving domestic violence and abuse, the Uniform Parentage Act and Uniform Interstate Family Support Act, dependency, child abuse and neglect, and juvenile status offenses.

In 2019, the Kentucky Supreme Court created a Business Court Docket Pilot project in the Jefferson County Circuit Court, effective January 1, 2020.

Circuit judges serve in eight-year terms. There are 57 circuits, which may have one or more judges, depending on the population and docket size. Circuits may include one or more counties; some have up to four. The Jefferson County Circuit Court is the largest single unified trial court in Kentucky.

Appeals from decisions of the Circuit Courts are made to the Kentucky Court of Appeals, the state intermediate appellate court, which may be further appealed to the Kentucky Supreme Court. (Criminal cases in which a defendant has been sentenced to death, life imprisonment, or imprisonment of 20 years or more are taken directly to the Kentucky Supreme Court.)

== Circuits ==
Current circuits of the circuit courts.

Number of judges in each circuit. 1 2 3 4 5 6 or more (Note: Kenton County has 6 judges, Fayette County has 9 judges, and Jefferson County has 23 judges.)

1. First Circuit – Ballard, Carlisle, Fulton, Hickman
2. Second Circuit – McCracken
3. Third Circuit – Christian
4. Fourth Circuit – Hopkins
5. Fifth Circuit – Crittenden, Webster, Union
6. Sixth Circuit – Daviess
7. Seventh Circuit – Logan, Todd
8. Eighth Circuit – Edmonson, Warren
9. Ninth Circuit – Hardin
10. Tenth Circuit – Hart, LaRue, Nelson
11. Eleventh Circuit – Green, Marion, Taylor, Washington
12. Twelfth Circuit – Henry, Oldham, Trimble
13. Thirteenth Circuit – Garrard, Jessamine
14. Fourteenth Circuit – Bourbon, Scott, Woodford
15. Fifteenth Circuit – Carroll, Grant, Owen
16. Sixteenth Circuit – Kenton
17. Seventeenth Circuit – Campbell
18. Eighteenth Circuit – Harrison, Nicholas, Pendleton, Robertson
19. Nineteenth Circuit – Bracken, Fleming, Mason
20. Twentieth Circuit – Greenup, Lewis
21. Twenty-first Circuit – Bath, Menifee, Montgomery, Rowan
22. Twenty-second Circuit – Fayette
23. Twenty-third Circuit – Estill, Lee, Owsley
24. Twenty-fourth Circuit – Johnson, Lawrence, Martin
25. Twenty-fifth Circuit – Clark, Madison
26. Twenty-sixth Circuit – Harlan
27. Twenty-seventh Circuit – Knox, Laurel
28. Twenty-eighth Circuit – Lincoln, Pulaski, Rockcastle
29. Twenty-ninth Circuit – Adair, Casey
30. Thirtieth Circuit – Jefferson - Jefferson County Circuit Court
31. Thirty-first Circuit – Floyd
32. Thirty-second Circuit – Boyd
33. Thirty-third Circuit – Perry
34. Thirty-fourth Circuit – McCreary, Whitley
35. Thirty-fifth Circuit – Pike
36. Thirty-sixth Circuit – Knott, Magoffin
37. Thirty-seventh Circuit – Carter, Elliott, Morgan
38. Thirty-eighth Circuit – Butler, Hancock, Ohio
39. Thirty-ninth Circuit – Breathitt, Powell, Wolfe
40. Fortieth Circuit – Clinton, Cumberland, Monroe
41. Forty-first Circuit – Clay, Jackson, Leslie
42. Forty-second Circuit – Calloway, Marshall
43. Forty-third Circuit – Barren, Metcalfe
44. Forty-fourth Circuit – Bell
45. Forty-fifth Circuit – McLean, Muhlenberg
46. Forty-sixth Circuit – Breckinridge, Grayson, Meade
47. Forty-seventh Circuit – Letcher
48. Forty-eighth Circuit – Franklin
49. Forty-ninth Circuit – Allen, Simpson
50. Fiftieth Circuit – Boyle, Mercer
51. Fifty-first Circuit – Henderson
52. Fifty-second Circuit – Graves
53. Fifty-third Circuit – Anderson, Shelby, Spencer
54. Fifty-fourth Circuit – Boone, Gallatin
55. Fifty-fifth Circuit – Bullitt
56. Fifty-sixth Circuit – Caldwell, Livingston, Lyon, Trigg
57. Fifty-seventh Circuit – Russell, Wayne
