= 1975 United States gubernatorial elections =

- November 1 and 4, 1975

4 governorships 3 states; 1 territory
| | Majority party | Minority party |
|---|---|---|
| Party | Democratic | Republican |
| Seats before | 36 | 13 |
| Seats after | 36 | 13 |
| Seat change | Steady | Steady |
| Seats up | 3 | 0 |
| Seats won | 3 | 0 |
- Democratic hold

United States gubernatorial elections were held in three states and one territory, on November 1, 1975, in Louisiana, and three days later in Kentucky and Mississippi. No governorships changed hands in these elections, as all three southern states remained under Democratic control.

== Election results ==
| State | Incumbent | Party | First elected | Result | Candidates |
|---|---|---|---|---|---|
| Kentucky | Julian Carroll | Democratic | 1974 (Note: Carroll took office after his predecessor (Wendell Ford) resigned.) | Incumbent elected to full term. | ✓ Julian Carroll (Democratic) 62.84%; Bob Gable (Republican) 37.16% |
| Louisiana | Edwin Edwards | Democratic | 1972 | Incumbent re-elected. | ✓ Edwin Edwards (Democratic) 62.35%; Robert G. Jones (Democratic) 24.29%; Wade O. Martin Jr. (Democratic) 12.17%; Ken Lewis (Democratic) 0.44% |
| Mississippi | Bill Waller | Democratic | 1971 | Incumbent term-limited. New governor elected. Democratic hold. | ✓ Cliff Finch (Democratic) 52.19%; Gil Carmichael (Republican) 45.14%; Henry Kirksey (Independent) 2.67% |

== Close states ==
States where the margin of victory was under 10%:

1. Mississippi, 7.05%

== Kentucky ==
1975 Kentucky gubernatorial election
- November 4, 1975
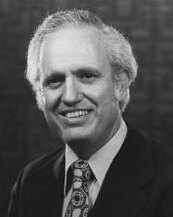

| Nominee | Julian Carroll | Bob Gable |
| Party | Democratic | Republican |
| Popular vote | 470,159 | 277,998 |
| Percentage | 62.84% | 37.16% |
- Carroll: 50–60% 60–70% 70–80% 80–90% >90% Gable: 50–60% 60–70% 70–80%
Governor before election
Julian Carroll
Democratic
Elected Governor
Julian Carroll
Democratic

The 1975 Kentucky gubernatorial election was held on November 4, 1975. Incumbent Democrat Julian Carroll defeated Republican nominee Robert E. Gable with 62.84% of the vote.

== Louisiana ==
1975 Louisiana gubernatorial election
- November 1, 1975
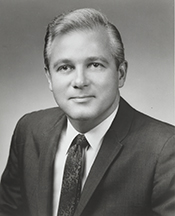

| Candidate | Edwin Edwards | Robert G. Jones | Wade O. Martin Jr. |
| Party | Democratic | Democratic | Democratic |
| Popular vote | 750,107 | 292,220 | 146,368 |
| Percentage | 62.35% | 24.29% | 12.17% |
- Parish results Edwards: 30–40% 40–50% 50–60% 60–70% 70–80% 80–90% Jones: 30–40% 40–50%
Governor before election
Edwin Edwards
Democratic
Elected Governor
Edwin Edwards
Democratic

The 1975 Louisiana gubernatorial election resulted in the re-election of Edwin Edwards to his second term as governor of Louisiana. This was the last time that a Democrat was re-elected to a second consecutive term as governor of Louisiana until 2019, 44 years later, when John Bel Edwards (no relation) won re-election.

This was the last gubernatorial election held before the adoption of the Louisiana primary in 1978.

== Mississippi ==
1975 Mississippi gubernatorial election
- November 5, 1975
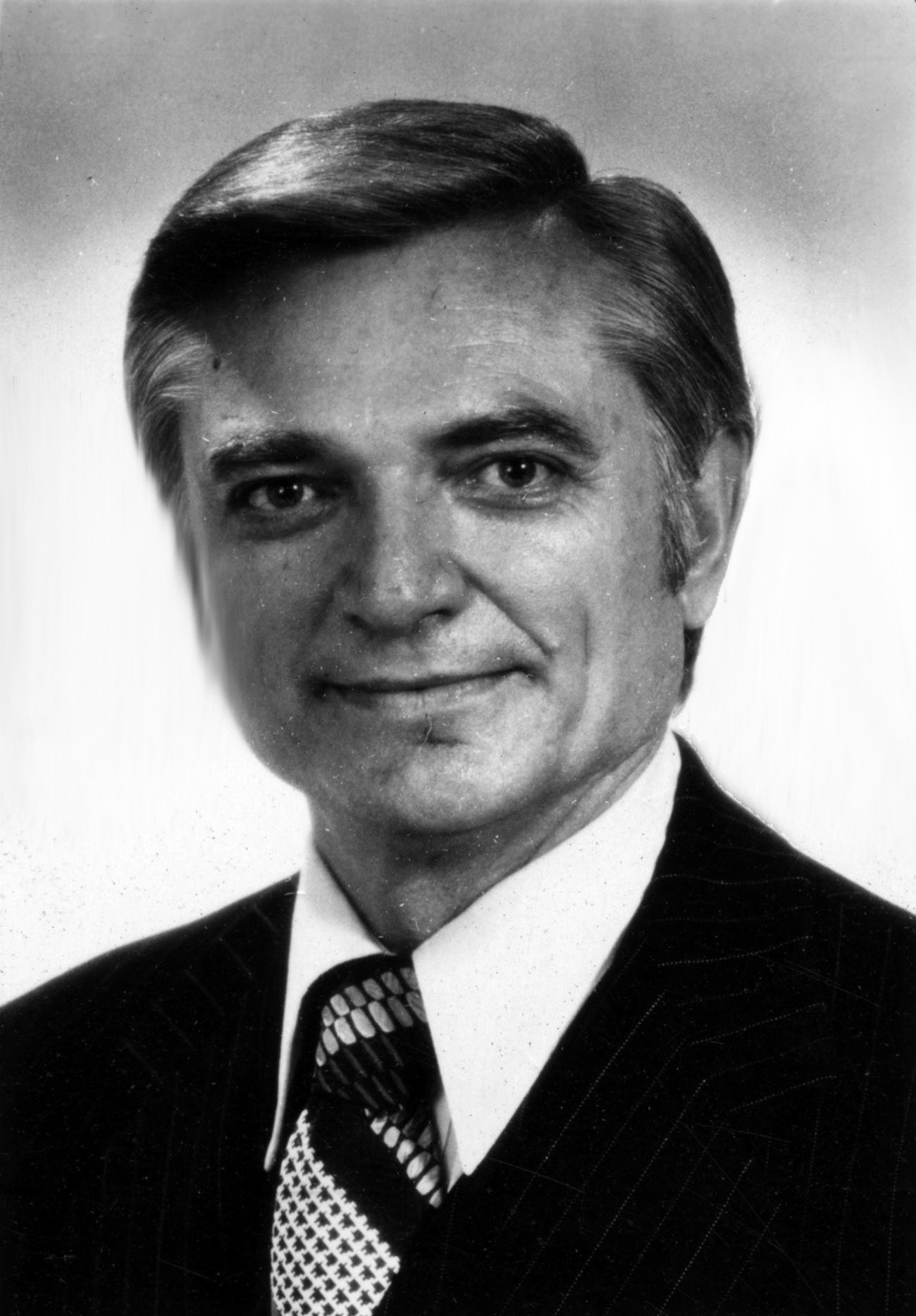

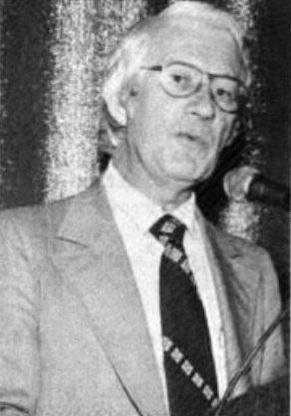
| Nominee | Cliff Finch | Gil Carmichael |
| Party | Democratic | Republican |
| Popular vote | 369,568 | 319,632 |
| Percentage | 52.19% | 45.14% |
- County results Finch: 40-50% 50-60% 60-70% 70-80% 80-90% Carmichael: 40-50% 50-60% 60-70%
Governor before election
Bill Waller
Democratic
Elected Governor
Cliff Finch
Democratic

The 1975 Mississippi gubernatorial election took place on November 5, 1975, in order to elect the Governor of Mississippi. Incumbent Democrat Bill Waller was term-limited, and could not run for reelection to a second term.
