= 1995 Kentucky gubernatorial election =

- November 7, 1995
- Turnout: 44.5% (▼1.7%)
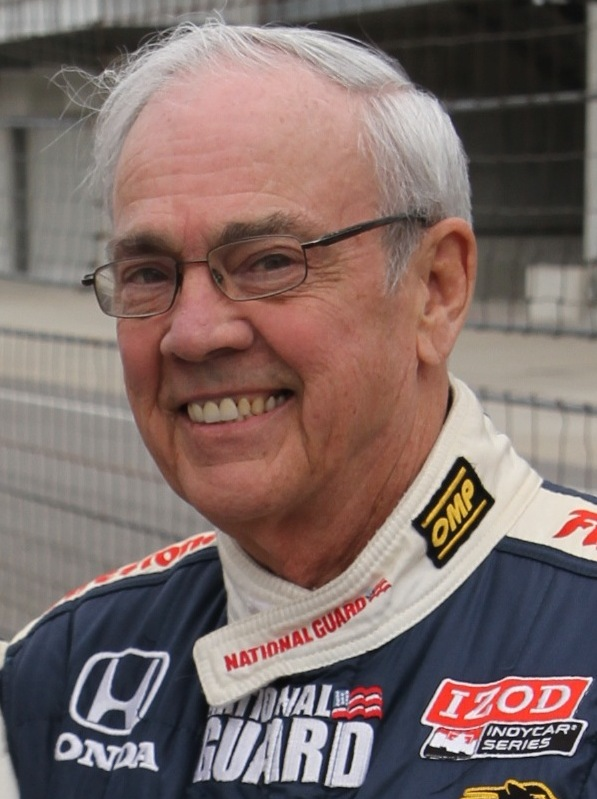

| Nominee | Paul E. Patton | Larry Forgy |
| Party | Democratic | Republican |
| Running mate | Steve Henry | Tom Handy |
| Popular vote | 500,605 | 479,227 |
| Percentage | 50.88% | 48.71% |
- Patton: 50–60% 60–70% 70–80% 80–90% Forgy: 40–50% 50–60% 60–70% 70–80%
Governor before election
Brereton C. Jones
Democratic
Elected Governor
Paul E. Patton
Democratic

The 1995 Kentucky gubernatorial election was held on November 7, 1995, to elect the governor and lieutenant governor of Kentucky. Democratic lieutenant governor Paul E. Patton narrowly defeated Republican attorney Larry Forgy to win his first term in office. Patton succeeded Democratic incumbent Brereton C. Jones, who was term limited.

Primary elections were held on May 23. Patton finished first in a field of four Democratic candidates with 45 percent of the vote, avoiding a primary runoff which would have been held had no one won at least 40 percent of the vote. Forgy, who narrowly lost the Republican nomination for governor in 1991, easily defeated former state party chairman Bob Gable with 82 percent of the vote. Patton's running mate was Jefferson County commissioner Steve Henry. Forgy's running mate was commonwealth's attorney Tom Handy.

This was the first gubernatorial election following the approval of 1992 Kentucky Amendment 2, which made two changes to the electoral process. The first was that the governor and lieutenant governor were to be elected on a joint ticket. The second was that the term limit for governor was changed to two consecutive terms; this was an increase from the prior limit of one consecutive term, leaving Virginia as the only state to prohibit its governor from serving immediate successive terms. However, this was only effective beginning with the winner of the 1995 election, making incumbent governor Brereton Jones ineligible to seek an immediate second term.

In a sign of the party's growing strength in suburban and exurban counties, this was the first gubernatorial election in which the Republican candidate won the counties of Bracken, Calloway, Scott, Shelby, and Spencer.

== Democratic primary ==
=== Candidates ===
==== Nominee ====
- Paul E. Patton, lieutenant governor of Kentucky (1991–1995) and Judge/Executive of Pike County (1982–1991)
  - Running mate: Steve Henry, surgeon and Jefferson County Commissioner (1992–1995)

==== Eliminated in primary ====
- Bob Babbage, Secretary of State of Kentucky (1992–1996) and Kentucky Auditor of Public Accounts (1988–1992)
  - Running mate: Tommy Thompson, builder
- Gatewood Galbraith, perennial candidate
  - Running mate: Jerry W. Hammond
- Steven Maynard
  - Running mate: Bonnie Lou Maynard
- John A. Rose, president of the Kentucky Senate (1993–1997) from the 28th district (1978–1999)
  - Running mate: Denise Harper Angel, Jefferson County Property Valuation Administrator (1990–2004)

=== Results ===
Results by county: Patton: 30–40%; 40–50%; 50–60%; 60–70%; 70–80%; 80–90%; Babbage: 30–40%; 40–50%; 50–60%; Rose: 40–50%; 50–60%

Democratic primary results
| Party | Candidate | Votes | % |
|---|---|---|---|
| Democratic | Paul E. Patton; Stephen L. Henry | 152,203 | 44.95 |
| Democratic | Bob Babbage; Tommy Thompson | 81,352 | 24.02 |
| Democratic | John A. "Eck" Rose; Denise Harper Angel | 71,740 | 21.18 |
| Democratic | Gatewood Galbraith; Jerry W. Hammond | 29,039 | 8.58 |
| Democratic | Steven "Butch" Maynard; Bonnie Lou Maynard | 4,305 | 1.27 |
| Total votes | | 338,639 | 100.0 |

== Republican primary ==
=== Candidates ===
==== Nominee ====
- Larry Forgy, attorney and candidate for governor in 1991
  - Running mate: Tom Handy, commonwealth's attorney of the 27th Circuit Court (1977–2003) and Republican nominee for attorney general in 1991

==== Eliminated in primary ====
- Bob Gable, chairman of the Republican Party of Kentucky (1986–1994) and Republican nominee for governor in 1975
  - Running mate: Shirley W. Palmer-Ball
- Tommy Klein, perennial candidate
  - Running mate: Tommy Klein III

=== Endorsements ===
Larry Forgy

U.S. representatives

- Ron Lewis, KY-02 (1994–2009)
Bob Gable

U.S. executive branch officials

- Joe Whittle, U.S. Attorney for the Western District of Kentucky (1986–1993)

U.S. representatives

- Larry J. Hopkins, KY-06 (1979–1993)
- Gene Snyder, KY-03 (1963–1965) and KY-04 (1967–1987)

Statewide officials

- Louie Nunn, governor of Kentucky (1967–1971)

State legislators

- Susan Stokes, HD-48 (1989–1993)

=== Results ===
Results by county: Forgy: 60–70%; 70–80%; 80–90%; >90%

Republican primary results
| Party | Candidate | Votes | % |
|---|---|---|---|
| Republican | Larry Forgy; Tom Handy | 97,099 | 82.44 |
| Republican | Robert E. "Bob" Gable; S. W. Palmer-Ball | 17,054 | 14.48 |
| Republican | Tommy Klein; Tommy Klein | 3,627 | 3.08 |
| Total votes | | 117,780 | 100.0 |

== General election ==
=== Results ===
1995 Kentucky gubernatorial election
| Party | Candidate | Votes | % | ±% |
|---|---|---|---|---|
| Democratic | Paul E. Patton; Stephen L. Henry | 500,605 | 50.88 | −13.85 |
| Republican | Larry Forgy; Tom Handy | 479,227 | 48.71 | +13.44 |
| Write-in | Gatewood Galbraith; Jerry W. Hammond | 3,965 | 0.40 | N/A |
| Total votes | | 983,797 | 100.0 | N/A |
| Turnout | | 1,000,206 | 44.50 | −1.69 |
| Registered electors | | 2,247,781 | | |
| Democratic hold | | | | |
