= 1988 Kentucky elections =

A general election was held in the U.S. state of Kentucky on November 8, 1988. The primary election for all offices was held on May 24, 1988.

== Federal offices ==
=== United States President ===
In 1988, Kentucky had 9 electoral votes in the Electoral College. Republican candidate George H. W. Bush won with 56 percent of the vote.

=== United States House of Representatives ===
In 1988, Kentucky had seven congressional districts, electing four Democrats and two Republicans.

== State offices ==
=== Kentucky Senate ===
The Kentucky Senate consists of 38 members. In 1988, half of the chamber (all odd-numbered districts) was up for election. Democrats maintained their majority, gaining one seat.

=== Kentucky House of Representatives ===
Results by district

All 100 seats in the Kentucky House of Representatives were up for election in 1988. Democrats maintained their majority, gaining one seat.

=== Kentucky Supreme Court ===
1988 Kentucky Supreme Court 7th district election
- November 8, 1988
- District 7
Candidate	Dan Jack Combs	James B. Stephenson
Popular vote	63,861	47,494
Percentage	57.35%	42.65%
- County results Combs: 50–60% 60–70% 70–80% Stephenson: 50–60%
Justice before election
James B. Stephenson
Elected Justice
Dan Jack Combs

The Kentucky Supreme Court consists of seven justices elected in non-partisan elections to staggered eight-year terms. District 7 was up for election in 1988.

==== District 7 ====
===== Primary election =====
Primary results
Candidate	Votes	%
James B. Stephenson (incumbent)	18,277	43.56
Dan Jack Combs	16,508	39.34
Charles S. Sinnette	7,178	17.11
Total votes	41,963	100.0

===== General election =====
1988 Kentucky Supreme Court 7th district election
Candidate	Votes	%
Dan Jack Combs	63,861	57.35
James B. Stephenson (incumbent)	47,494	42.65
Total votes	111,355	100.0

== Local offices ==
=== School boards ===
Local school board members are elected to staggered four-year terms, with half up for election in 1988.

== Ballot measures ==
=== Amendment 1 ===
==== Text ====
Shall Section 226 of the constitution be amended to provide that the General Assembly may establish a Kentucky State lottery; may establish a state lottery to be conducted in cooperation with other states; and that any lottery so established shall be operated by or on behalf of the Commonwealth of Kentucky?

==== Results ====
Results by county: Yes: 50–60%; 60–70%; 70–80%; No: 50–60%; 60–70%

Amendment 1
Choice	Votes	%
For	694,577	60.85
Against	446,937	39.15
Total	1,141,514	100.00

=== Amendment 2 ===
==== Text ====
Shall Section 19 of the constitution be amended to provide that in any instrument heretofore or hereafter executed purporting to sever the surface and mineral estates or to grant a mineral estate or a right to extract minerals, which fails to state in specific terms the method of coal extraction to be employed, or where said instrument contains language subordinating the surface estate to the mineral estate, it shall be held, in the absence of clear evidence to the contrary, that the intention of the parties to the instrument was that the coal be extracted only by the methods of commercial coal extraction commonly known to be in use in the area affected at the time the instrument was executed, and that the mineral estate be dominant to the surface estate for the purposes of coal extraction by only the methods of commercial coal extraction commonly known to be in use in the area affected at the time the instrument was executed?

==== Results ====
Results by county: Yes: 50–60%; 60–70%; 70–80%; 80–90%; >90%

Amendment 2
Choice	Votes	%
For	882,960	82.51
Against	187,119	17.49
Total	1,070,079	100.00

== See also ==
- Elections in Kentucky
- Politics of Kentucky
- Political party strength in Kentucky
