= Jim Host =

American businessman (born 1937)

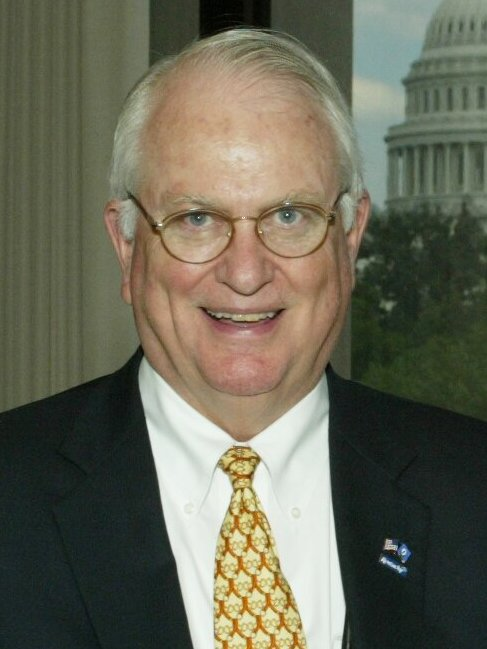
Host in 2005

Wilford James Host (born November 23, 1937, in Kane, Pennsylvania) is an American businessman best known for founding Host Communications, a pioneering college sports-marketing and production services company that was acquired by IMG in 2007. Host is on the National Advisory Board of the College of Communication and Information at the University of Kentucky. Host also led the organizations responsible for the development of two college basketball arenas in Kentucky, Rupp Arena in Lexington and KFC Yum! Center in Louisville.

== Early life ==
Host was born in Kane, Pennsylvania to Wilford and Beatrice Host. His father worked in tanneries, and they traveled from Pennsylvania to New York, Virginia, and West Virginia looking for work. The family settled in Ashland, Kentucky when Jim was an eighth grader.

Host was one of the first two recipients of a baseball scholarship offered by the University of Kentucky. He earned a bachelor's degree in radio arts from the university in 1961. During his time at UK, Host started recording a lot of play-by-play radio broadcasts for college and high school sports. He worked with the UK Student Station, WBKY, from 1957 to 1959 covering UK games and in 1959 he created the Kentucky Central UK Network, one of five UK broadcast organizations until 1961.

Following his career as a Wildcat, Host was a pitcher in the Chicago White Sox farm system in 1959 until he suffered a career-ending arm injury.

== Professional and business career ==
=== Politics ===
In 1967, at age 29, he became the youngest member of Kentucky Gov. Louie B. Nunn's cabinet as commissioner of the department of public information. He later became commissioner of the department of parks and, as founding chairman, helped to start the Kentucky Horse Park. In 2010, the Kentucky Horse Park hosted the World Equestrian Games (WEG) and from 2006 to 2009 Host served as the Chairman of the WEG.

In 1971, Host unsuccessfully ran for Lieutenant Governor of Kentucky on the ticket of Republican Tom Emberton, who had also served in the administration of Nunn, who hurt the party's chances by winning an increase in the sales tax to 5 percent from 3 percent in 1968.

From 2003 to 2005, Host served as Kentucky's secretary of commerce under governor Ernie Fletcher.

=== Host Communications ===
In 1972, Host started Jim Host & Associates, which later became Host Communications, Inc. Within a week of starting his company, he was contacted by Fayette County officials to do promotional work for the Lexington Tourist and Convention Bureau. They became Host's first client and their relationship eventually led to the formation of the Lexington Center Corp., which oversaw construction of the Lexington Civic Center (now known as Central Bank Center) and Rupp Arena. Host served as the executive director of both groups.

His company continued its rise to prominence when it bought the radio broadcast rights to University of Kentucky football and basketball games in 1974. Host paid $51,887 for the rights and financed the deal with the help of a letter of credit from his Lexington banker. More growth came when Host acquired the NCAA radio rights in 1975. That deal spurred a very fruitful business relationship between Host and the NCAA that would span decades.

Host is credited with implementing the first collegiate corporate marketing program with the NCAA in 1985.

At the time, college coaches handled their own endorsement deals separately from the universities they coached for, which often led to conflicts of interests between sponsors. When Jerry Claiborne became the Kentucky football head coach he signed a deal with Pepsi that included sideline rights in the stadium. Host attended a game that season with the largest Coca-Cola distributor in the state of Kentucky who noticed the Pepsi cups on the team's bench and grew confused. Host acknowledged this inconsistency and proposed a new agreement to the university that packaged all of the team's media and marketing rights together.

In 1983, Host Communications introduced what became known as the NCAA's Corporate Partner Program, and in 1985 the first collegiate corporate marketing program was implemented.

Through the years, Host Communications expanded its marketing and promotional services to other universities and athletic conferences. At its peak, the company had more than 800 employees, 24 offices across the country and $140 million in annual revenue.

In 2003, Host retired as CEO of Host Communications. In 2008, International Management Group (IMG) bought Host Communications for $74.3 million. Joining forces with Collegiate Licensing Co., the two formed IMG College, which represented the multimedia rights for over 90 universities, conferences, collegiate associations and venues. Additionally, IMG College held licensing rights to more than 150 colleges and universities. IMG College merged with Learfield in 2018.

=== Louisville Arena Authority ===
In 2005, Kentucky Governor Ernie Fletcher created the Louisville Arena Authority, Inc., and named Host as chairman. The group was tasked with overseeing the construction of a new arena for the city of Louisville, which resulted in the construction of the KFC Yum! Center. Host did not accept pay in his role as chairman, and stepped down from his position in 2011 at the age of 74. When the arena opened in October 2010, the 14,000 square foot lobby was dedicated to him and named Host Hall in his honor.

The arena, whose naming rights Yum! Brands acquired, is also supported by tax increment financing (TIF); the area covered by the TIF district was expanded to shore up the arena's finances, and its debt was refinanced in December 2017. It also negotiated higher fees from the University of Louisville, which had abandoned plans to build an on-campus arena to replace Freedom Hall, a state facility, as its home court, clearing the way for the downtown arena.

== Personal life ==
Host and his wife have two children and eight grandchildren. He also has two stepchildren.

== Honors ==
Host is a member of 14 different business and sports halls of fame. In 1995, he was inducted into the Travel Industry of America's Hall of Leaders alongside big-time names like the Hyatt Hotels Corporation and the Walt Disney Company. In 1998, he was inducted into the National Tourism Hall of Fame.

In 2000, Host was named to the University of Kentucky Distinguished Alumni Hall of Fame and in 2001 he was named the Kentuckian of the Year by the Chandler Foundation. In 2003, Host was given a University of Kentucky Public Relations Lifetime Achievement Award. He has also earned a Lifetime Achievement Award from the university's School of Journalism and Telecommunications and is a member of the University of Kentucky Sports Hall of Fame.

In 2010, Host was inducted into the Kentucky Entrepreneur Hall of Fame. He also received the Kentucky Chamber of Commerce Commonwealth Legacy Award that year. Also in 2010, Host was included in the inaugural class of the Sports Business Journal's "Champions of Sports Business."

In 2014, Host was recipient of National Football Foundation and College Hall of Fame's award for Outstanding Contribution to Amateur Football.

Host has received a Naismith Memorial Basketball Hall of Fame Chairman's Cup Award and is a Naismith Memorial Basketball Hall of Fame Life Trustee.

Party political offices
Preceded by Thomas B. Ratliff	Republican nominee for Lieutenant Governor of Kentucky; 1971	Succeeded by Shirley W. Palmer-Ball
