= 1980 Kentucky elections =

A general election was held in the U.S. state of Kentucky on November 4, 1980. The primary election for all offices was held on May 27, 1980.

== Federal offices ==
=== United States President ===
In 1980, Kentucky had 9 electoral votes in the Electoral College. Republican candidate Ronald Reagan won with 49 percent of the vote.

=== United States Senate ===
Incumbent Democratic senator Wendell Ford won reelection, defeating Republican challenger Mary Louise Foust.

=== United States House of Representatives ===
In 1980, Kentucky had seven congressional districts, electing four Democrats and three Republicans.

== State offices ==
=== Kentucky Supreme Court ===
1980 Kentucky Supreme Court elections
- November 4, 1980

2 of the 7 districts of the Kentucky Supreme Court

The Kentucky Supreme Court consists of seven justices elected in non-partisan elections to staggered eight-year terms. District 7 was up for election in 1980. A special elections was held in district 5.

==== District 5 ====
1980 Kentucky Supreme Court 5th district special election
- District 5
Candidate	Robert F. Stephens	N. Mitchell Meade
Popular vote	65,709	47,207
Percentage	58.19%	41.81%
- County results Stephens: 50–60% 60–70% 70–80% Meade: 50–60%
Justice before election
Robert F. Stephens
Elected Justice
Robert F. Stephens

1980 Kentucky Supreme Court 5th district special election
Candidate	Votes	%
Robert F. Stephens (incumbent)	65,709	58.19
N. Mitchell Meade	47,207	41.81
Total votes	112,916	100.0

==== District 7 ====
1980 Kentucky Supreme Court 7th district election
- District 7
Candidate	James B. Stephenson	Cordell H. Martin
Popular vote	51,387	34,389
Percentage	59.91%	40.09%
- County results Stephenson: 50–60% 60–70% 70–80% 80–90% Martin: 50–60% 60–70% Tie: 50%
Justice before election
James B. Stephenson
Elected Justice
James B. Stephenson

===== Primary election =====
Primary results
Candidate	Votes	%
James B. Stephenson (incumbent)	10,100	42.78
Cordell H. Martin	8,158	34.55
Robert J. Greene	5,352	22.67
Total votes	23,610	100.0

===== General election =====
1980 Kentucky Supreme Court 7th district election
Candidate	Votes	%
James B. Stephenson (incumbent)	51,387	59.91
Cordell H. Martin	34,389	40.09
Total votes	85,776	100.0

== Local offices ==
=== School boards ===
Local school board members are elected to staggered four-year terms, with half up for election in 1980.

== See also ==
- Elections in Kentucky
- Politics of Kentucky
- Political party strength in Kentucky
