= 2000 Kentucky elections =

A general election was held in the U.S. state of Kentucky on November 7, 2000. The primary election for all offices was held on May 23, 2000.

== Federal offices ==
=== United States President ===
Kentucky had 8 electoral votes in the Electoral College. Republican candidate George W. Bush won with 56 percent of the vote.

=== United States House of Representatives ===
Kentucky has six congressional districts, electing five Republicans and one Democrat.

== State offices ==
=== Kentucky Senate ===
Results by district

The Kentucky Senate consists of 38 members. In 2000, half of the chamber (all odd-numbered districts) was up for election. Republicans maintained their majority, without gaining or losing any seats.

=== Kentucky House of Representatives ===
Results by district

All 100 seats in the Kentucky House of Representatives were up for election in 2000. Democrats maintained their majority, gaining one seat.

=== Kentucky Supreme Court ===
2000 Kentucky Supreme Court 5th district election
- November 7, 2000
- District 5
Candidate	James E. Keller	Larry Forgy
Popular vote	114,829	82,282
Percentage	58.26%	41.74%
- County results Keller: 50–60% 60–70% Forgy: 50–60%
Justice before election
James E. Keller
Elected Justice
James E. Keller

The Kentucky Supreme Court consists of seven justices elected in non-partisan elections to staggered eight-year terms. District 5 was up for election in 2000.

==== District 5 ====
2000 Kentucky Supreme Court 5th district election
Candidate	Votes	%
James E. Keller (incumbent)	114,829	58.26
Larry Forgy	82,282	41.74
Total votes	197,111	100.0

=== Commonwealth’s Attorneys ===
Commonwealth's Attorneys, who serve as the prosecutors for felonies in the state, are elected to six-year terms. One attorney is elected for each of the 57 circuits of the Kentucky Circuit Courts.

=== Circuit Clerks ===
Each county elected a Circuit Court Clerk to a six-year term.

== Local offices ==
=== Mayors ===
Mayors in Kentucky are elected to four-year terms, with cities holding their elections in either presidential or midterm years.

=== City councils ===
Each incorporated city elected its council members to a two-year term.

=== School boards ===
Local school board members are elected to staggered four-year terms, with half up for election in 2000.

== Ballot measures ==
=== Amendment 1 ===
==== Text ====
Are you in favor of amending the Constitution to establish annual sessions of the legislature, in addition to the current 60 legislative day regular session in even numbered years, by requiring the Kentucky General Assembly to meet in odd-numbered years for up to 30 legislative days during which the General Assembly may consider any issue except that the General Assembly shall be prohibited from passing any bill raising revenue or appropriating funds unless agreed to by three-fifths of all members elected to each house?

==== Results ====
Results by county: Yes: 50–60%; 60–70%; No: 50–60%; 60–70%; 70–80%

Amendment 1
Choice	Votes	%
For	576,081	52.33
Against	524,877	47.67
Total	1,100,958	100.00

=== Amendment 2 ===
==== Text ====
Are you in favor of amending the Constitution to abolish the Railroad Commission, and transfer its duties to another State agency?

==== Results ====
Results by county: Yes: 50–60%; 60–70%; 70–80%; No: 50–60%; 60–70%

Amendment 2
Choice	Votes	%
For	547,020	50.55
Against	535,025	49.45
Total	1,082,045	100.00

== See also ==
- Elections in Kentucky
- Politics of Kentucky
- Political party strength in Kentucky
