= Shirley W. Palmer-Ball =

- Born: May 10, 1930; Louisville, Kentucky, U.S.
- Died: August 17, 2012 (aged 82); Louisville, Kentucky, U.S.
- Occupation: Businessman
- Political party: Republican nominee for lieutenant governor, 1975

Shirley Webster Palmer-Ball (May 10, 1930 – August 17, 2012) was a politically active Kentucky Republican who was his party's nominee for lieutenant governor in 1975.

He was born to Lawrence Bernard Palmer-Ball (1886–1961) and the former Virginia Allemong Vogt (1895–1990) and attended Centre College, later serving in the United States Army in Germany from 1951 to 1953. He served in the administration of Kentucky Governor Louie B. Nunn from 1967 to 1971, serving Commissioner of Alcoholic Beverage Control, and later as Commissioner of the Department of Parks.

Palmer-Ball was the Republican nominee for Lieutenant Governor of Kentucky in 1975, running on the same ticket as Bob Gable of McCreary County. Palmer-Ball defeated Bob Bersky in the Republican primary, winning 30,317 votes (59.5%) to Bersky's 20,608 (40.5%). He lost the election to Democrat Thelma Stovall, while Gable lost the governor's race to Democrat Julian Carroll. Stovall was the first woman to win either of the state's highest two offices and the first woman nominated for lieutenant governor or governor of Kentucky by either major party. Palmer-Ball received 357,744 votes (45.4%) compared to Stovall's 430,011 votes (54.6%), and Gable received 277,998 votes (37.2%) compared to Carroll's 470,159 votes (62.8%), putting him about 90,000 votes ahead of his ticketmate Gable.

In 1995, he again sought the office of Lieutenant Governor, running again as Gable's running mate in the primary. They finished second, with 17,054 votes, to Larry Forgy and his running-mate, Tom Handy, who won the primary with 97,099 votes. In 2003, Palmer-Ball served on the transition team for the new incoming Republican governor Ernie Fletcher.

The Palmer-Ball family owns and manages the Palmer Products Corporation, a manufacturing business located in Louisville, Kentucky. He served as president of the Palmer Products Corporation, Lemon and Son Jewelers and Kentucky Bubbling Springs.

Shirley W. Palmer-Ball died on August 17, 2012, aged 82, of undisclosed causes.

Party political offices
Preceded by Jim Host	Republican nominee for Lieutenant Governor of Kentucky; 1975	Succeeded by Hal Rogers
