= 1984 Kentucky elections =

A general election was held in the U.S. state of Kentucky on November 6, 1984. The primary election for all offices was held on May 29, 1984.

== Federal offices ==
=== United States President ===
In 1984, Kentucky had 9 electoral votes in the Electoral College. Republican candidate Ronald Reagan won with 60 percent of the vote.

=== United States Senate ===
Incumbent Democratic senator Walter Dee Huddleston was defeated for reelection by Republican challenger Mitch McConnell.

=== United States House of Representatives ===
In 1984, Kentucky had seven congressional districts, electing four Democrats and three Republicans.

== State offices ==
=== Kentucky House of Representatives ===
Results by district

All 100 seats in the Kentucky House of Representatives were up for election in 1984. Democrats maintained their majority, losing three seats.

=== Kentucky Supreme Court ===
1984 Kentucky Supreme Court 5th district election
- November 6, 1984
- District 5
Candidate	Robert F. Stephens	Julian Gabbard
Popular vote	66,629	14,242
Percentage	82.39%	17.61%
- County results Stephens: 70–80% 80–90%
Justice before election
Robert F. Stephens
Elected Justice
Robert F. Stephens

The Kentucky Supreme Court consists of seven justices elected in non-partisan elections to staggered eight-year terms. District 5 was up for election in 1984.

==== District 5 ====
1984 Kentucky Supreme Court 5th district election
Candidate	Votes	%
Robert F. Stephens (incumbent)	66,629	82.39
Julian Gabbard	14,242	17.61
Total votes	80,871	100.0

== Local offices ==
=== School boards ===
Local school board members are elected to staggered four-year terms, with half up for election in 1984.

== Ballot measures ==
=== Amendment 1 ===
==== Text ====
Shall Section 99 of the Constitution be amended so as to permit sheriffs to be re-elected or act as deputies for succeeding terms?

==== Results ====
Results by county: Yes: 50–60%; 60–70%; 70–80%; 80–90%; No: 50–60%; 60–70%

Amendment 1
Choice	Votes	%
For	512,741	62.78
Against	303,987	37.22
Total	816,728	100.00

== See also ==
- Elections in Kentucky
- Politics of Kentucky
- Political party strength in Kentucky
