= 1992 Kentucky elections =

A general election was held in the U.S. state of Kentucky on November 3, 1992. The primary election for all offices was held on May 26, 1992. As of 2026, this is the most recent election in which there were more than two ballot measures.

== Federal offices ==
=== United States President ===
Kentucky had 8 electoral votes in the Electoral College. Democratic candidate Bill Clinton won with 45 percent of the vote.

=== United States Senate ===
Incumbent senator Wendell Ford won reelection, defeating Republican challenger David L. Williams.

=== United States House of Representatives ===
Kentucky has six congressional districts, electing four Democrats and two Republicans.

== State offices ==
=== Kentucky Senate ===
Results by district

The Kentucky Senate has 38 members. In 1992, half of the chamber (all odd-numbered districts) was up for election. Democrats maintained their majority, losing two seats.

=== Kentucky House of Representatives ===
Results by district

All 100 seats in the Kentucky House of Representatives were up for election in 1992. Democrats maintained their majority, gaining four seats.

=== Kentucky Supreme Court ===
1992 Kentucky Supreme Court 5th district election
- November 3, 1992
- District 5
Candidate	Robert F. Stephens
Popular vote	72,727
Percentage	100.0%
Justice before election
Robert F. Stephens
Elected Justice
Robert F. Stephens

The Kentucky Supreme Court consists of seven justices elected in non-partisan elections to staggered eight-year terms. District 5 was up for election in 1992.

==== District 5 ====
1992 Kentucky Supreme Court 5th district election
Candidate	Votes	%
Robert F. Stephens (incumbent)	Unopposed	
Total votes	72,727	100.0

== Local offices ==
=== School boards ===
Local school board members are elected to staggered four-year terms, with half up for election in 1992.

== Ballot measures ==
=== Amendment 1 ===
==== Text ====
Are you in favor of allowing the General Assembly to permit the conduct of charitable lotteries and charitable gift enterprises by charitable organizations provided the General Assembly passes statutes to assure the proper functioning, honesty, and integrity of charitable lotteries and the organizations which conduct them?

==== Results ====
Results by county: Yes: 50–60%; 60–70%; 70–80%; 80–90%; No: 50–60%; 60–70%

Amendment 1
Choice	Votes	%
For	777,373	70.53
Against	324,824	29.47
Total	1,102,197	100.00

=== Amendment 2 ===
==== Text ====
Are you in favor of (1) permitting the Governor and other state officers elected in 1995 and after to serve two consecutive terms; (2) electing the Governor and Lieutenant Governor by casting one vote for both offices; (3) giving the Lieutenant Governor duties assigned by the Governor and the General Assembly, with the Senate selecting a senator to act as President of the Senate; (4) allowing the Governor to retain power while absent from the state, and transferring power to the Lieutenant Governor only if the Governor cannot discharge the duties of the office; (5) removing the provision requiring an election to fill a vacancy in the Governor's office that occurs in the first two years of the term; (6) if the Governor and Lieutenant Governor cannot act, transferring power to the Attorney General and then to the Auditor; (7) eliminating the offices of Register of Land Office and Superintendent of Public Instruction as elective offices; (8) permitting the General Assembly to require the Senate's consent to the selection of inferior state officer and members of boards and commissions; and (9) moving all elections (except elections for state constitutional officers) to even-numbered years by adding one year to the terms of all officials regularly elected in 1993, adding one year to the terms of local officials elected in 1995, and subtracting one year from the terms of circuit judges and judges of the court of appeals elected in 1999?

==== Results ====
Results by county: Yes: 50–60%; No: 50–60%; 60–70%; 70–80%

Amendment 2
Choice	Votes	%
For	540,156	51.13
Against	516,233	48.87
Total	1,056,389	100.00

=== Amendment 3 ===
==== Text ====
Are you in favor of (1) beginning in 1995, having the Commissioner of Agriculture, State Treasurer, and Secretary of State appointed by the Governor instead of elected, and allowing them to be appointed for successive terms; (2) permitting the General Assembly to require the Senate's consent to the selection of inferior state officers and members of boards and commissions; and (3) beginning in 1995, eliminating the Railroad Commission and the offices of Register of Land Office and Superintendent of Public Instruction as elective offices?

==== Results ====
Results by county: No: 50–60%; 60–70%; 70–80%

Amendment 3
Choice	Votes	%
For	408,234	38.81
Against	643,708	61.19
Total	1,051,942	100.00

== See also ==
- Elections in Kentucky
- Politics of Kentucky
- Political party strength in Kentucky
