= Bob Gable =

American businessman from Frankfort (1934–2024)

- Born: February 20, 1934; New York, New York, U.S.
- Died: November 29, 2024 (aged 90); Lexington, Kentucky, U.S.
- Education: Stanford University
- Political party: Republican
- Spouse: Emily T. Gable (m. 1958; died 2017)
- Children: 3

Robert Elledy Gable (February 20, 1934 – November 29, 2024) was an American businessman from Frankfort, who was the Kentucky Republican gubernatorial nominee in 1975. Gable lost to the incumbent Democratic governor Julian Carroll. Carroll received 470,159 votes (62.8 percent) to Gable's 277,998 (37.2 percent).

In 1995, Gable again sought the governor's office but lost by a large margin in the Republican primary. With Shirley W. Palmer-Ball, his 1975 running mate reprising that role, Gable lost the primary with 17,054 votes (14.5 percent) to Larry Forgy and Tom Handy's 97,099 votes (82.4 percent). Forgy, as the Republican nominee, was then defeated in the general election by Democrat Paul E. Patton.

Gable formerly resided in Stearns in McCreary County in south Kentucky. Gable is the great-grandson of Justus S. Stearns, founder and owner of Stearns Coal and Lumber Company. He, along with his wife, Emily T. Gable, and family, moved in 1968 to serve as Parks Commissioner in the administration of Governor Louie Nunn. He was a chairman of the Kentucky Republican Party for seven years.

In 2008, Gable was an at-large elector for the McCain/Palin ticket, which won a majority in Kentucky.

Gable was married to Emily Thompson from 1958 until her death in 2017. He died November 29, 2024, at the age of 90, in Lexington, Kentucky.

Party political offices
Preceded by Tom Emberton	Republican nominee for Governor of Kentucky; 1975	Succeeded by Louie B. Nunn
