= 1971 Kentucky gubernatorial election =

- November 2, 1971
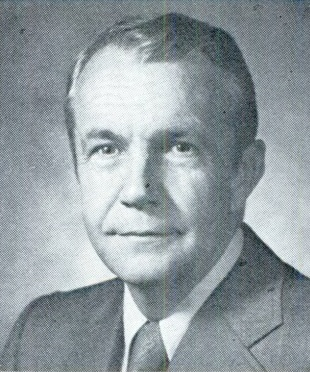

Nominee	Wendell Ford	Thomas Emberton
Party	Democratic	Republican
Popular vote	470,720	412,653
Percentage	50.57%	44.33%
- Ford: 30–40% 40–50% 50–60% 60–70% 70–80% Emberton: 40–50% 50–60% 60–70% 70–80%
Governor before election
Louie Nunn
Republican
Elected Governor
Wendell Ford
Democratic

The 1971 Kentucky gubernatorial election was held on November 2, 1971. Incumbent Republican Louie Nunn, was ineligible for a second term due to term limits, a rule that was later repealed in 1992.

In the Democratic primary, Lieutenant Governor Wendell Ford ran against former Governor Bert Combs and 6 other opponents. Ford would win in an easy victory that wasn't expected. In the Republican primary, Thomas Emberton easily won his primary and was endorsed by Governor Nunn.

In the general election, Ford and Emberton were joined by former Governor A. B. "Happy" Chandler, running as an Independent, as well as American Party candidate William Smith. The Republicans had hoped that Chandler would help Emberton's chances, but Ford ultimately won the general election. As of 2022, this is the last time that the Republican candidate has won Jefferson County.

== Republican primary ==
Kentucky Republican Party Primary, May 25, 1971
Party	Candidate	Votes	%
Republican	Thomas Emberton	84,863	84.07
Republican	Reid Martin	6,379	6.32
Republican	Thurman Jerome Hamlin	5,469	5.42
Republican	Samuel Prather	4,234	4.19

== Democratic primary ==
Kentucky Democratic Party primary, May 25, 1971
Party	Candidate	Votes	%
Democratic	Wendell H. Ford	237,815	53.01
Democratic	Bert T. Combs	195,678	43.61
Democratic	William Shires	3,934	0.88
Democratic	John E. Knipper	3,128	0.70
Democratic	Earl R. McIntosh	2,496	0.56
Democratic	Robert McCreary Johnson	2,049	0.46
Democratic	Jesse N. R. Cecil	1,838	0.41
Democratic	Wilton Benge Cupp	1,729	0.39

== Results ==
1971 Kentucky gubernatorial election
Party	Candidate	Votes	%	±%
Democratic	Wendell H. Ford	470,720	50.57	+2.58
Republican	Tom Emberton	412,653	44.33	−6.87
Independent	Albert B. Chandler	39,493	4.24	N/A
American Independent	William E. Smith	7,924	0.85	N/A
Total votes		930,790	100.0	N/A
Democratic gain from Republican				
