= Larry Forgy =

American politician (1939–2022)

Personal details
- Born: Lawrence Eugene Forgy; August 4, 1939 Lewisburg, Kentucky, U.S.
- Died: January 13, 2022 (aged 82) Lexington, Kentucky, U.S.
- Party: Republican
- Relatives: Alice Forgy Kerr (sister)
- Education: University of Kentucky; George Washington University (BA, JD)

Lawrence Eugene Forgy (August 4, 1939 – January 13, 2022) was an American Republican politician and gubernatorial candidate from Lexington, Kentucky.

== Life and career ==
A native of Lewisburg, Kentucky, Forgy attended the University of Kentucky at Lexington, where he was a member of Delta Tau Delta social fraternity. He transferred to George Washington University in Washington, D.C. from which he received both bachelor's and Juris Doctor degrees. While in law school at GWU, he became friends with Harry Reid of Nevada, who would eventually become a Democratic United States senator and the Senate Majority Leader.

Forgy became a practicing attorney and the president of the non-profit organization Health Kentucky. Over the years, he served as a Republican national committeeman, the Kentucky chairman of Ronald Reagan's successful presidential election bids, vice chairman of the Kentucky Council of Higher Education, chairman of the Finance Committee of the University of Kentucky Board of Trustees, and general counsel and budget director in the administration of Governor Louie B. Nunn (1967-71).

He announced that he would seek the Republican gubernatorial nomination in 1987 but soon withdrew from the race, citing fundraising difficulties. Forgy did run for the Republican gubernatorial nomination in 1991, but lost in the primary to then- U.S. Representative Larry J. Hopkins, also of Lexington. Forgy again ran for governor in 1995, this time receiving the Republican nomination, but he was defeated in the general election by Democrat Paul E. Patton.

In 2000, Forgy ran for the Kentucky Supreme Court but lost the election to James E. Keller. He was reportedly considering running in the 2008 United States Senate election in Kentucky, but ended up not filing for the office, held by Senate Minority Leader Mitch McConnell of Jefferson County. Forgy had been an early McConnell backer when the then-Jefferson County judge (an administrative office in Kentucky) was first elected to the Senate in 1984.

In 2004, Forgy co-chaired Bryan Coffman's unsuccessful race for Kentucky's 6th congressional district. Coffman lost to Democrat Ben Chandler, grandson of former governor and U.S. senator Happy Chandler.

In 2011, Forgy stated that the only reason Kentucky Governor Steven Beshear picked Jerry Abramson to be his running mate was "to attract New York and Hollywood Jewish money" for the campaign.

In 2012, Forgy was self-employed as an attorney in Frankfort, Kentucky.

== Health and death ==
Forgy suffered a heart attack in 2017. He died in Lexington on January 13, 2022, at the age of 82.

Party political offices
Preceded by Larry Hopkins	Republican nominee for Governor of Kentucky; 1995	Succeeded by Peppy Martin
