= Robert F. Stephens =

American judge (1927–2002)

Kentucky Secretary of Justice
- In office May 4, 1999 – April 13, 2002
- Governor: Paul E. Patton
- Preceded by: Dan Cherry
- Succeeded by: Ishmon F. Burks Jr

Chief Justice of the Kentucky Supreme Court
- In office October 2, 1982 – October 5, 1998
- Preceded by: John Palmore
- Succeeded by: Joseph Lambert

Justice of the Kentucky Supreme Court
- In office December 5, 1979 – May 4, 1999
- Preceded by: Scott Elgin Reed
- Succeeded by: James E. Keller

42nd Attorney General of Kentucky
- In office January 5, 1976 – December 5, 1979
- Governor: Julian Carroll
- Preceded by: Ed W. Hancock
- Succeeded by: Steve Beshear

County Judge of Fayette County
- In office January 5, 1970 – January 5, 1976
- Preceded by: Joe E. Johnson III
- Succeeded by: Paul D. Gudgel

Personal details
- Born: Robert Francis Stephens, Jr. August 16, 1927 Covington, Kentucky
- Died: April 13, 2002 (aged 74) Lexington, Kentucky
- Resting place: Lexington Cemetery
- Party: Democratic Party
- Spouse(s): Lola June Sandusky (m. 1953; div. 1983) Pattie White McLellan (m. 1985; div. 1993)
- Children: 4
- Education: Indiana University; University of Kentucky College of Law
- Profession: Lawyer
- Known for: Longest-serving chief justice of the Kentucky Supreme Court

Military service
- Branch/service: United States Navy
- Years of service: 1945
- Battles/wars: World War II

Robert Francis Stephens Jr. (August 16, 1927 – April 13, 2002) was an American politician, lawyer, and judge.

== Early life ==
Robert Francis Stephens Jr. was born August 26, 1928, in Covington, Kentucky, to Robert Francis and his first wife, Helen Macke. He was the only child of this marriage, which ended in divorce, but his father would marry twice more, and each marriage brought Stephens a step-sibling. At age 7, Stephens moved with his mother to Miami, Florida, where her new husband, Joseph Dressman, was the city editor for the Miami Herald. When the paper was sold, Stephens' step-father lost his job, and the family moved back to Northern Kentucky, where Dressman got a job with The Cincinnati Times-Star.

Stephens graduated as valedictorian of his class at Beechwood High School in Fort Thomas, Kentucky, in 1945. He joined the United States Navy for a year and served in World War II before completing a pre-law curriculum at Indiana University in 1948 and receiving his law degree from the University of Kentucky College of Law in 1951. After graduation, he worked as a law clerk for future Kentucky Governor Bert T. Combs, then a justice of the Kentucky Court of Appeals. In 1952, he began work as an attorney for the state Department of Insurance. From 1953 to 1958, he served as counsel for Savage Lumber and Manufacturing Company, a Lexington company owned by his father-in-law. For the next three years, he was a partner in a Lexington law firm with Harry B. Miller Jr., but left the firm and pursued a solo legal practice and political career.

In 1985, Stephens served as a vestry member at Lexington's Christ Church Cathedral.

== Family ==
On June 27, 1953, Stephens married Lola June Sandusky; the couple had four children – three sons and a daughter. They separated in 1983 and later divorced.

Stephens married his second wife, Pattie White McLellan, on November 26, 1985. The couple separated on September 1, 1990, and Stephens filed for divorce on June 1, 1992. When the case was assigned to one of Stephens' former political opponents, his lawyer, State Senator Michael Maloney, withdrew the divorce petition and re-filed it the next day. When the second petition was assigned to a different judge, Stephens' wife's lawyer accused Stephens of judge shopping, alleging the second judge had political connections to both Stephens and Maloney. On appeal, the Fayette County Domestic Relations Commissioner reinstated the original petition, saying Maloney should have asked the judge to recuse himself rather than withdrawing and re-filing the petition. Ultimately, both judges recused themselves from hearing the case, and it was randomly assigned to a third judge, who finalized the divorce on September 28, 1993.

== Political career ==
In 1964, Stephens become the county attorney for Fayette County. Running as a Democrat in 1969, he defeated incumbent county judge Joe E. Johnson III. In this position, he acquired several acres of park land for the city, including the 105 acres (0.42 km^{2}) Shillito Park. He also oversaw the planning of the Lexington Civic Center and created the Bluegrass Area Development District, serving as its first chair in 1971. After being re-elected in 1973, Stephens was a leader in the movement to consolidate the governments of Lexington and Fayette County, forming the Lexington-Fayette Urban County Government in 1974. The position of county judge lost much of its power in the merger. Stephens considered running for mayor of Lexington, but Governor Julian Carroll advised him against it, and he decided not to enter the race.

In 1975, Stephens defeated David van Horn in the Democratic primary for Attorney General of Kentucky. He won the general election over Republican Joe Whittle. As attorney general, he strengthened consumer protection measures and unified the state's Commonwealth's attorneys offices under the office of the attorney general to provide them with more support in their duties.

=== Kentucky Supreme Court ===
In November 1979, a month before his term as attorney general expired, Stephens was appointed by Governor Carroll to fill a vacancy on the Kentucky Supreme Court caused by the resignation of Scott Elgin Reed. The following year, he was chosen in a special election to fill the remainder of Reed's unexpired term, defeating N. Mitchell Meade. In October 1982, following the resignation of chief justice John Palmore, Stephens was chosen by his peers as the court's new chief justice over James B. Stephenson, who also desired the job.

Lexington lawyer Julian Reid Gabbard challenged Stephens for his seat representing the 5th Appellate District in the 1984 election. While Stephens had worked to increase the number of judgeships in the state to mitigate judges' workloads, Gabbard maintained that, "I've never seen a judge overworked. I've only seen them overpaid." Gabbard also said the increasing costs of filing a suit were impeding citizens' access to the court system. Further, Gabbard complained that Stephens' acceptance of campaign contributions from lawyers could compromise his impartiality when those lawyers later argued cases before him.

Late in the contest, Gabbard asked to have the seat declared vacant until 1986 because the 1984 General Assembly had changed the district's make-up, moving Powell, Lee, Estill and Garrard counties to other districts while adding Anderson, Spencer and Washington counties to the 5th District. Although both Stephens and Gabbard lived in Fayette County, which was not moved, Gabbard argued that no candidate could meet the two-year residency requirement for the district because the district, as reconstituted, had not existed that long. Gabbard complained that the change was made after the candidates had filed for office and further accused Stephens of having lobbied for the change in order to remove Powell County from his district because residents of that county had petitioned for his removal from the court after he overturned a death sentence for a county resident convicted of murder.

Stephens raised about $93,000 in the race, which he used in a multimedia ad campaign. Gabbard, who refused contributions from lawyers, raised almost $6,000 and did relatively little campaigning. Stephens won the election for a full, eight-year term on the court by a vote of 65,917 to 14,087.

Stephens implemented a plan to educate the public about the role of the Supreme Court by holding court in locations other than the state capital. In 1986, the court sat in Louisville, and in May 1987, it sat in both Owensboro and Paducah in the western part of the state. In 1988, however, Court of Appeals justice Dan Jack Combs objected to the court's plan to sit in Ashland, Pikeville, and Hazard, claiming the move was designed to help 7th District Justice James B. Stephenson retain his seat on the court. Combs was Stephenson's challenger in the election, and Ashland, Pikeville, and Hazard were the three most populous cities in the district. Stephens claimed the timing of the court's tour through the eastern part of the state was coincidental. Combs ultimately won a convincing victory in the election.

The court's most notable decision during Stephens' tenure was the 1989 case of Rose v. Council for Better Education, which found Kentucky's entire public education system unconstitutional because of the inherent inequity between funding for poorer districts and more affluent ones. He also presided over decisions that ended legal immunity for Kentucky cities and found legal the economic incentives offered by the state to Toyota to entice the construction of the Toyota Motor Manufacturing Kentucky assembly plant. As chief justice, Stephens instituted advances such as videotaping the court's proceedings and keeping electronic court records. He also advocated reforms by the Kentucky Bar Association to increase transparency in cases of discipline against lawyers.

Stephens' peers on the court elected to him to an unprecedented third, four-year term as chief justice in 1990. Later that year, he announced he would reconsider his longstanding decision to retire at the end of his term in 1992, but said his re-election as chief justice was not a factor in the decision. He was unopposed in the 1992 election. In July 1997, Stephens was in the minority in a 5–2 decision against Harold McQueen Jr., who sought a stay of execution in the electric chair on grounds that it constituted cruel and unusual punishment.

Stephens continued as chief justice until October 1998, making him the longest-serving chief justice in the court's history. He resigned from the court in May 1999 to accept an appointment as Secretary of Justice in the administration of Governor Paul E. Patton. He was instrumental in securing Ishmon F. Burks Jr.'s appointment as the first African-American commissioner of the Kentucky State Police in August 2000.

In June 2001, Stephens was diagnosed with lung cancer, which spread to his liver later that year. He continued in his position as Secretary of Justice until his death, which occurred at his home on April 13, 2002. After lying in state in the Capitol Rotunda, Stephens was buried in Lexington Cemetery.

== Awards and honors ==
In 1984, Stephens received the American Judicature Society's Herbert Harley Award, in part for his work in making continuing legal education mandatory for judges in Kentucky. The Kentucky Bar Association named him its Outstanding Judge of the Year in 1986.

Just before the expiration of her term in December 1987, Governor Martha Layne Collins appointed Stephens to a seat on the University of Kentucky Board of Trustees. Before assuming the position, Stephens requested a non-binding opinion from the Ethics Committee of the Kentucky Judiciary on the legality of his simultaneously serving as a Supreme Court Justice and a university trustee. The panel advised Stephens not to provide legal counsel to the board, not to raise funds for the university, not to vote as a trustee on any matter likely to result in a lawsuit, and to recuse himself as a justice from any case involving the university. Stephens agreed to these restrictions and began his term as trustee in January 1988. His term expired in 1992, and then-Governor Brereton Jones refused to re-appoint him, along with two other state court judges who sat on other university boards, because he felt there was too much potential for conflicts of interest.

In 1991, Stephens received a Justice Award from the Kentucky Women's Advocates "for creating the Gender Bias Task Force to investigate the fairness of the judicial system for women and for making records regarding domestic violence public." The organization gave Stephens a second Justice Award in 1995 for "his support of the adoption of gender fairness into state judicial language and his continued support of equal justice for women".

Stephens was elected president of the Conference of Chief Justices in 1992. In 1993, staff members for the Kentucky Supreme Court compiled and published 500 copies of a 55-page book of Stephens' accomplishments entitled "A Decade of Progress for Kentucky Courts". The book was mailed to every state's chief justice and to every judge in Kentucky. Critics complained that the book contained no criticism of Stephens, was researched during employees' regular work hours, and was mailed at state taxpayers' expense. Administrative Office of the Courts Director Don Cetrulo ultimately reimbursed the state for the postage and donated three weeks of vacation time to cover the time spent researching the book.

Stephens was inducted into the University of Kentucky Law Alumni Association Hall of Fame in 1996. The Robert F. Stephens Justice Center, which opened in 2001, houses the district and circuit courts for Fayette County.

Party political offices
Preceded by Ed W. Hancock	Democratic nominee for Attorney General of Kentucky; 1975	Succeeded by Steve Beshear
