= Tom Emberton =

American lawyer (1932–2022)

Judge of the Kentucky Court of Appeals
- In office 1987–2004

Personal details
- Born: July 14, 1932 Tompkinsville, Kentucky, U.S.
- Died: October 20, 2022 (aged 90) Edmonton, Kentucky, U.S.
- Party: Republican
- Spouse: Julia C. Emberton
- Children: 2
- Education: Western Kentucky University (BA); University of Louisville (JD)
- Profession: Lawyer, judge

Thomas Dale Emberton Sr. (July 14, 1932 — October 20, 2022) was an American politician and judge in the state of Kentucky. He was the Republican nominee for his state's governorship in the 1971 election. His campaign was aided by Mitch McConnell.

== Biography ==
Emberton was born in Tompkinsville, Kentucky, in 1932. After attending Western Kentucky University, he earned a Juris Doctor degree from the University of Louisville School of Law in 1962 and was admitted to the bar in that same year. He served as County Attorney for Metcalfe County from 1966 to 1967. Backed by term-limited Governor Louie B. Nunn and Senator John Sherman Cooper, He lost to the Democratic Lieutenant Governor Wendell H. Ford, later a U.S. senator, 470,720 votes (50.6 percent) to 412,653 (44.3 percent). Former Democratic U.S. Senator and Governor Happy Chandler of Versailles received the remaining 39,493 votes (5.1 percent), running as an Independent.

Prior to his gubernatorial candidacy, Emberton served as a member of the Public Service Commission in the Nunn administration. In 1980, he ran in Kentucky's 5th congressional district but lost the primary to the eventual winner, Hal Rogers of Somerset in Pulaski County, who still holds the seat. In 1987, Democratic Governor Wallace Wilkinson appointed him to fill a vacancy on the Kentucky Court of Appeals. He held that position until his retirement in 2004.

Emberton resided in Edmonton, the seat of Metcalfe County in southern Kentucky. On October 20, 2022, his home caught fire. He escaped, then died upon reentering in an attempt to save it. The Metcalfe County Courthouse was named for Emberton and a bronze statue of him, by Amanda Matthews of Lexington, was unveiled in front of the courthouse on Nov, 2, 2025.

Party political offices
| Preceded by Louie B. Nunn | Republican nominee for Governor of Kentucky; 1971 | Succeeded by Bob Gable |
