= Dan Jack Combs =

American judge (1924–2002)

Justice of the Kentucky Supreme Court
- In office January 2, 1989 – June 30, 1993
- Preceded by: James B. Stephenson
- Succeeded by: Sara Walter Combs

Judge of the Kentucky Court of Appeals
- In office 1983–1989
- Preceded by: Elijah M. Hogge
- Succeeded by: Richard L. Elswick

Personal details
- Born: Dan Jack Combs; August 22, 1924 Floyd County, Kentucky
- Died: May 25, 2002 (aged 77) Stanville, Kentucky
- Resting place: Combs family cemetery
- Education: Cumberland University; Cumberland School of Law
- Profession: Lawyer; judge

Military service
- Allegiance: United States
- Branch/service: United States Navy
- Battles/wars: World War II

Dan Jack Combs (August 22, 1924 – May 25, 2002) was a judge of the Kentucky Court of Appeals from 1983 to 1989 and justice of the Kentucky Supreme Court from 1989 to 1993.

Combs rose to national prominence by successfully defending Appalachian Volunteers Margaret and Alan McSurely against charges of sedition in a case that took 15 years to fully adjudicate. After a long legal career, Combs unseated incumbent Elijah M. Hogge for a seat on the Kentucky Court of Appeals. In 1989, he challenged incumbent James B. Stephenson for his seat on the Kentucky Supreme Court. During the campaign, he attacked some of Stephenson's previous opinions in violation of a state judicial code that forbade judicial candidates from stating opinions related to cases they might later be asked to rule on. After the election, which Combs won, he was suspended for three months for violating the code, but the suspension was not carried out because Combs appealed the constitutionality of the code and eventually succeeded in overturning it.

Throughout his tenure on the court, Combs was known as being sympathetic to unpopular litigants and causes. He retired from the court in 1993, citing ill health stemming from a motorcycle accident and two strokes. In retirement, he was twice arrested on marijuana-related charges. He admitted using the drug medicinally to help with insomnia and became an advocate for its legalization. He died at home on May 25, 2002.

== Early life and family ==
Combs was born August 22, 1924, in Floyd County, Kentucky, to Albert Ghent and Hettie Gilliam Combs. His father worked in the coal mines and was killed in a rockfall, leaving his mother to raise him and his four siblings.

Combs served in the United States Naval Air Corps during World War II and was discharged in 1947. After helping combat flooding near the town on Betsy Layne, Combs and some friends purchased a bottle of whisky before returning home. Although Combs said he had only taken one drink, he was arrested for public intoxication; he said he believed his muddied appearance led the arresting constable to assume he was drunk. In jail, he decided to forego re-enlistment in the Navy and enter the legal profession to correct what he saw as injustices in the legal system. After completing a law curriculum at Cumberland University in Lebanon, Tennessee, he was admitted to the bar in 1951 and began practice in his native Eastern Kentucky. He received his juris doctor degree from Samford University's Cumberland School of Law in 1969.

Combs was married three times. He married his first wife, Mary Jane, in 1953. They divorced in May 1973. His second wife's name was Betty, and his third wife's name was Teresa.

== McSurely case ==
Combs rose to national prominence by representing Margaret and Alan McSurely, two civil rights advocates. The McSurelys were part of an organization known as the Southern Conference Educational Fund, which advocated that the area's poor citizens band together to oust the incumbent political leaders and elect a "people's government." On August 11, 1967, Commonwealth's Attorney Thomas Ratliff and sheriff's deputies raided the couple's home in Pike County and arrested them on charges of sedition. The papers and other property seized in the raid was used by Arkansas Senator John Little McClellan in his investigations of civil disturbances in the wake of the Civil Rights Movement.

Combs held that the state's sedition law was unconstitutional and petitioned the federal judiciary to overturn it. Combs said he had reached an agreement with Ratliff not to seek indictments for the McSurelys until the constitutionality of the sedition law was settled; however, Judge James B. Stephenson instructed the grand jury that the federal government could not stop them from investigating and returning an indictment. The trial dragged on for years, with Combs appearing as a witness on the couple's behalf in 1982. The sedition law was eventually found unconstitutional, and on January 7, 1983, a federal jury awarded the McSurelys $2 million for violation of the Fourth Amendment rights against illegal search and seizure.

== Judicial career ==
After 32 years in private practice, Combs was elected to the Kentucky Court of Appeals in 1983, defeating incumbent Elijah M. Hogge by almost 4,000 votes. He served until 1988, when he was elected to the Kentucky Supreme Court over incumbent James B. Stephenson.

Just before the non-partisan primary campaign, Combs complained that Supreme Court Chief Justice Robert F. Stephens' plan to convene the court in Ashland, Pikeville and Hazard – the three most populous cities in the 7th District, which Combs, Stephenson, and a third candidate were vying to represent on the court – amounted to a political ploy meant to convey Stephens' endorsement of the incumbent. Stephens denied any political motive, saying the trip was part of a public education campaign that began in 1986 with trips to Louisville, Owensboro, and Paducah. In an election that saw a record-low 15% turnout, Stephenson finished about 2,000 votes ahead of Combs in the primary, and both men finished well ahead of the third candidate in the race, who was eliminated from the general election ballot with the loss.

On the night of the primary election, Combs publicly challenged Stephenson to a debate, to be televised on Kentucky Educational Television. Stephenson declined, citing a state judicial code forbidding candidates for judicial offices to discuss positions on issues that might come before them if elected. Combs maintained that this code violated the state constitution and the federal Constitution and refused to abide by it. He charged that Stephenson had too often sided with wealthy litigants over poorer ones including denying compensation to injured workers and upholding prohibitions on felons owning firearms, which Combs said violated the Second Amendment. Following an investigation, the Kentucky Judicial Retirement and Removal Commission ordered him suspended from the bench for three months without pay for violating the code in February 1990. Combs appealed on grounds that the code abridged his First Amendment right to free speech. The suspension was not carried out pending the outcome of Combs' appeal, and it was overturned in a case that ultimately was affirmed by the U.S. Supreme Court.

Combs won the general election over Stephenson by over 7,500 votes. During his tenure, he was known as "the conscience" of the court. Combs was called "a defender of civil liberties and frequently unpopular people" by The Kentucky Post.

On August 10, 1989, Combs was thrown from his motorcycle after being struck by a drunk driver. He was treated for multiple injuries at Pikeville Methodist Hospital, but released the same night. Afterward, he suffered from memory lapses and depression, including thoughts of suicide. He participated in psychiatric therapy, including shock therapy, to treat his condition, but his psychiatrist opined that the depression was a permanent condition.

Combs retired from the court on June 30, 1993, because of failing health. He said he had experienced a stroke 10 months previous, and tests showed that he had since experienced a second. The strokes worsened his memory condition. Combs recommended his law clerk, Richard Hunt, as his replacement, but Governor Brereton Jones appointed Sara Walter Combs, no relation to Dan Jack, making her the first female justice in the court's history.

== Legal issues and marijuana advocacy ==
On December 29, 1994, Combs filed for Chapter 13 bankruptcy protection. He reported $132,346 in debts, including $20,000 in credit-card debt and $10,000 in delinquent mortgage payments on his $150,000 house.

Combs and his son, Ghent, were arrested in 1995 after a police raid on his house produced a cannabis plant as well as 4 ounces (110 g) of processed marijuana. Combs accused police of planting evidence to support their charge and initially denied that he had ever used marijuana. He later admitted to using the drug to help with insomnia, but maintained he had only been using it since retiring from the Supreme Court in 1993. Reporters later uncovered testimony from Combs' psychiatrist in a 1992 civil case that Combs had told him after a 1989 motorcycle accident that he used marijuana for insomnia. Combs later blamed his inconsistency on his Alzheimer's-like memory disorder that made it difficult for him to remember details like when he began smoking marijuana. Charges against Combs were dismissed on the condition that he have no further legal issues with drugs for two years.

In a subsequent interview, Combs admitted to using marijuana since his arrest. The case made him a celebrity among advocates for the legalization of cannabis, and he was interviewed by High Times magazine. Combs said he refused to seek a prescription for a sleep aid for his insomnia because such drugs are addictive. He said he opposed the federal ban on medicinal marijuana: "Are we constitutionally bound to be in a state of depression, or may we alleviate that by resorting to natural foods, nature's foods—God's foods?"

In December 1996, Combs was again arrested for an unlawful transaction with a minor after allowing his then-14-year-old son, Dan Jack Combs Jr., to smoke marijuana in the family's home. Police noticed the drug's odor when coming to the home to serve an arrest warrant against Combs' older son on a drunk driving charge. District Judge James Allen confined Combs' younger son to the Floyd County Juvenile Detention Center on grounds that he was a danger to himself and others. The elder Combs had his son placed on suicide watch and maintained that the incidents, including Allen's decision to detain his son, were part of a political vendetta against him and his family.

Combs' arrest resulted in the 1995 charges against him being reinstituted. A Floyd County judge entered a plea of "innocent" on Combs' behalf after he failed to appear at his arraignment, which his attorney said was due to his memory disorder. A 1997 Associated Press story described Combs as a recovering alcoholic. All charges against Combs were dismissed in August 1997 because his memory disorder made it impossible to prove his intent to break the law. Drug possession charges against Combs' son were also dropped.

In January 1997, Combs was arrested for writing a $500 cold check to a coal company, allegedly as reimbursement for damage caused by his son Dan Jack Jr. The charge was dropped in February 1997 on the condition that Combs forfeit the $500 he posted as bond.

== Death ==
Combs died at his home in Stanville, Kentucky, on May 25, 2002. He was buried in a family cemetery.
