= James B. Stephenson =

American judge (c. 1916–2005)

Justice of the Kentucky Supreme Court
- In office January 1, 1976 – January 2, 1989
- Preceded by: Court established
- Succeeded by: Dan Jack Combs

Justice of the Kentucky Court of Appeals
- In office January 1, 1973 – December 31, 1975
- Preceded by: Edward P. Hill
- Succeeded by: Court became Supreme Court

Circuit Court judge
- In office 1958–1972

Personal details
- Born: January 26, 1916 Greenup County, Kentucky
- Died: June 21, 2005 (aged 89)
- Party: Democratic
- Spouse: Betty Campbell Paddison Stephenson
- Children: 2
- Education: University of Kentucky; University of Kentucky College of Law
- Profession: Lawyer

Military service
- Branch/service: United States Army Air Corps
- Rank: Captain

James Bennett Stephenson (January 26, 1916 – June 21, 2005) was a justice of the Kentucky Supreme Court from 1976 to 1988.

== Biography ==
=== Early life, education, and military service ===
Stephenson was born January 26, 1916, in Greenup County, Kentucky, to judge and Democratic state senator E. D. Stephenson and Emabel Bennett Stephenson. He attended the University of Kentucky where he obtained a bachelor's in 1938, and then a law degree from the University of Kentucky College of Law in 1940. His grandfather Joseph B. Bennett had been a Republican congressman and his great-grandfather B. F. Bennett was a delegate at the 1890 Kentucky constitutional convention.

He was admitted to the bar in Kentucky in 1939 and practiced law in Pike County, Kentucky. Stephenson served during World War II as a captain in the United States Army Air Corps also serving as a court martial trial judge and intelligence officer. He returned to Pike County after the war and continued to practice law. He first ran to be a judge in 1953, but was unsuccessful.

=== Judicial service ===
In May 1957 Stephenson defeated Francis M. Burke for the Democratic nomination to the Pike County Circuit Court with no Republican nomination. The Republicans then decided to nominate Burke as their candidate, but Stephenson successfully challenged the legality of this move in the circuit and appellate courts, and remained the only candidate for the seat. Stephenson was thus selected unopposed and served on the Pike County Circuit Court judge from 1958 to 1972, serving three six year terms.

Stephenson stood for a seat on the Kentucky Court of Appeals in 1972 as a Democratic candidate. He ran against Republican Don A. Ward a circuit judge from Perry County, Kentucky. He won and was duly elected to the Kentucky Court of Appeals in November 1972.

He was elevated from the court of appeals to the newly established Kentucky Supreme Court on New Year's Day 1976, and then served until 1988. He had run for the position of chief justice in 1982 but lost to Robert F. Stephens. He sought a fourth term in 1988 but lost his seat to Dan Jack Combs.

=== Personal life and death ===
Stephenson died June 21, 2005, of heart failure at the age of 89. He had outlived his wife Betty Campbell Paddison Stephenson who had died in 1997, together they had two daughters.

Political offices
Preceded by Newly established court	Justice of the Kentucky Supreme Court; 1976–1989	Succeeded by Dan Jack Combs
