= 1975 Kentucky gubernatorial election =

- November 4, 1975
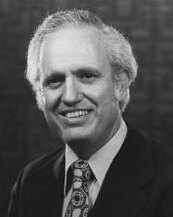

| Nominee | Julian Carroll | Bob Gable |
| Party | Democratic | Republican |
| Popular vote | 470,159 | 277,998 |
| Percentage | 62.84% | 37.16% |
- Carroll: 50–60% 60–70% 70–80% 80–90% >90% Gable: 50–60% 60–70% 70–80%
Governor before election
Julian Carroll
Democratic
Elected Governor
Julian Carroll
Democratic

The 1975 Kentucky gubernatorial election was held on November 4, 1975. Incumbent Democrat Julian Carroll defeated Republican nominee Robert E. Gable with 62.84% of the vote.

== Primary elections ==
Primary elections were held on May 27, 1975.

=== Democratic primary ===
==== Candidates ====
- Julian Carroll, incumbent Governor
- Todd Hollenbach, Jefferson County Judge/Executive
- Mary Louise Foust, former Kentucky State Auditor
- Robert McCreary Johnson

==== Results ====
Primary results Carroll: 50–60% 60–70% 70–80% 80–90% >90% Hollenbach: 50–60%

Democratic primary results
| Party | Candidate | Votes | % |
|---|---|---|---|
| Democratic | Julian Carroll (incumbent) | 264,136 | 66.29 |
| Democratic | Todd Hollenbach | 113,590 | 28.51 |
| Democratic | Mary Louise Foust | 14,901 | 3.74 |
| Democratic | Robert McCreary Johnson | 5,838 | 1.47 |
| Total votes | | 398,465 | 100.00 |

=== Republican primary ===
==== Candidates ====
- Robert E. Gable, businessman
- Elmer Begley Jr.
- Tommy Klein
- Granville Thomas

==== Results ====
Republican primary results
| Party | Candidate | Votes | % |
|---|---|---|---|
| Republican | Robert E. Gable | 38,113 | 51.34 |
| Republican | Elmer Begley Jr. | 16,855 | 22.70 |
| Republican | Tommy Klein | 10,844 | 14.61 |
| Republican | Granville Thomas | 8,426 | 11.35 |
| Total votes | | 74,238 | 100.00 |

== General election ==
=== Candidates ===
- Julian Carroll, Democratic
- Robert E. Gable, Republican

=== Results ===
1975 Kentucky gubernatorial election
| Party | Candidate | Votes | % | ±% |
|---|---|---|---|---|
| Democratic | Julian M. Carroll (incumbent) | 470,159 | 62.84 | +12.27 |
| Republican | Robert E. "Bob" Gable | 277,998 | 37.16 | −7.18 |
| Total votes | | 748,157 | 100.0 | N/A |
| Democratic hold | | | | |
