= James E. Keller =

American judge

Justice of the Kentucky Supreme Court
- In office May 7, 1999 – May 31, 2005
- Preceded by: Robert F. Stephens
- Succeeded by: John C. Roach

Personal details
- Born: August 13, 1942 Harlan, Kentucky
- Died: June 2, 2014 (aged 71) Lexington, Kentucky
- Education: University of Kentucky College of Law

James E. Keller (August 13, 1942 – June 2, 2014) was an American judge born in Harlan, Kentucky, whose judicial career was centered in Lexington, Kentucky. He received his undergraduate degree from Eastern Kentucky University. In 1966, he graduated from the University of Kentucky College of Law before entering into private practice from 1969 until 1976.

He was elected to serve as a circuit court judge in Fayette County, where he served as chief judge for more than twenty years. In 1999, Keller was appointed to the Kentucky Supreme Court. He retained the seat in a subsequent election.

Keller was inducted into the University of Kentucky College of Law Hall of Fame in 2005. He retired from the Court in 2005.

In 2006, he again ran for elected office as a Democrat against State Senator Alice Forgy Kerr. Justice Keller garnered 43.4% of the vote against the incumbent. He died of cancer in 2014.
