= 1993 East Carter High School shooting =

1993 school shooting in Grayson, Kentucky

Coordinates: 38.3246°N 82.9335°W

- Location: Grayson, Kentucky, U.S.
- Date: January 18, 1993; 33 years ago c. 2:45 – 3:01 pm
- Attack type: Double-murder, school shooting, hostage taking
- Weapon: .38-caliber revolver
- Deaths: 2
- Injuries: 0
- Perpetrator: Gary Scott Pennington

The East Carter High School shooting occurred on January 18, 1993, in Grayson, Kentucky, United States. The incident occurred when 17-year-old Gary Scott Pennington walked into an English classroom and fatally shot his teacher Deanna McDavid and head custodian Marvin Hicks, and held classmates hostage for 15 minutes before surrendering to police.

== Shooting ==
On January 18, 1993, Pennington took a .38-caliber revolver that was owned by his father, and brought the weapon to school by concealing it in a duffel bag-type backpack.

At approximately 2:45 pm he entered his seventh-period English class and shot at his teacher Deanna McDavid. His first shot missed, with McDavid screaming, "What are you doing, Scott?", to which Pennington replied, "Shut up, bitch". The second shot hit her in the forehead, and was fatal. Students inside McDavid's class believed this was a skit that she had arranged for her drama club. The school custodian, Marvin Hicks, and social studies teacher Jack Calhoun entered the classroom to investigate the sounds. Pennington fatally shot Hicks in the abdomen, and aimed his pistol at Calhoun without shooting him. Witnesses reported that Hicks pushed a female student away from himself before he was shot. Mandy Morse, a student inside the classroom, wrote a farewell letter to her family due to the fear she would be killed. Some students recalled Pennington threatening to kill other students, while others told the class he would commit suicide.

He then held his classmates hostage before he allowed two students to leave the classroom shortly after. He then allowed students to leave the room in groups of two every minute, and allowed the last five hostages to leave the classroom at 3:01 pm Pennington himself walked outside of the classroom, where he surrendered to two police officers waiting with their guns drawn in the hallway adjacent to the classroom.

== Victims ==
- Deanna McDavid née Mullins was born on January 19, 1944, in Olive Hill, Kentucky, and graduated at Olive Hill High School in 1962. She enrolled at Morehead State University as an English major, and earned a Bachelor of Arts degree in 1966. She worked as a high school teacher in Akron, Ohio for 14 years, before returning to Carter County in 1981. McDavid became a senior English teacher at East Carter High School, and was also director of the school drama club. She lived in Grayson, Kentucky with her husband Daniel, and their three children – son Brent, daughters Lisa and Angela.
- Marvin Hicks was born in 1941 in Olive Hill, Kentucky, and had been employed as head custodian at East Carter High School for nine years. He resided in Olive Hill with his wife Margie.

== Perpetrator and motives ==
The identity of the shooter was originally protected at the time of his arrest, but was soon revealed to be 17-year-old Gary Scott Pennington. He had lived with his family in Elliott County, Kentucky his entire childhood, before moving to Carter County in August 1992. It was reported that Pennington had expressed frustration with moving to Carter County. His family was living in poverty in the years and months prior to the shooting, as the family could not afford plumbing and lacked sufficient electricity. His father, Gary Pennington, was an unemployed former laborer and coal miner who received monthly disability pensions, due to a coal mining accident. His mother Esta was a homemaker.

Pennington had excelled academically since elementary school, participating in the academic team since the fifth grade and winning the Eastern Kentucky regional science competition in the seventh grade. He attended Elliott County High School for grades nine to eleven, and taught himself calculus during his freshman year. After moving to Carter County, he joined the academic team at East Carter High School. He also developed a grudge against his English teacher Mrs. McDavid after she gave him a "C" as his midterm grade. The midterm grade was for an essay Pennington had written about the Stephen King novel Rage; the content of the essay concerned McDavid, given that some of his other writing likewise focused on "violence, death, and dying". McDavid even apparently brought her concerns before her colleagues.

Afterward, he said he did not dislike Mrs. McDavid, but that his intention was to kill any two people in order to become eligible for the death penalty. Because of his affiliation with the story written by Stephen King and portraying actions like the character Charlie Decker, all books that had been written by the author were taken out of the high school.

== Imprisonment ==
A Carter County grand jury indicted Pennington on two counts of second-degree murder and 22 counts of kidnapping on June 15, 1993. Due to the difficulty of seating an impartial jury, the trial venue was moved twice, first to Morgan County and then to Johnson County.

Opening arguments in his trial began on February 9, 1995. Pennington entered a plea of guilty but mentally ill, was subsequently convicted and sentenced to life in prison without the possibility of parole for 25 years on February 28, 1995. He is currently imprisoned at the Eastern Kentucky Correctional Complex in West Liberty, Kentucky.

=== Prison assault ===
At approximately 1:45 pm on April 12, 2014, a contract food service employee at the Kentucky State Penitentiary in Eddyville was seriously assaulted by Pennington. The employee, JoAnne Smith, was hospitalized in stable condition. At the time of the assault, Pennington was placed in segregation at the prison pending an investigation by the Kentucky Department of Corrections and the Kentucky State Police. As a result of that investigation, Pennington was indicted by a Lyon County grand jury with first degree assault, which is a Class B felony in Kentucky. In July 2015, Pennington was convicted of first degree assault on JoAnne Smith in Lyon County and was sentenced to an additional 20 years in prison. In addition to the criminal conviction, Pennington was transferred to the Kentucky State Reformatory in LaGrange shortly after the assault and faced internal Department of Corrections charges.

== See also ==
- List of school shootings in the United States by death toll
- List of school shootings in the United States (before 2000)
- List of school-related attacks
