= Kentucky Correctional Institution for Women =

Women's prison in Kentucky

Coordinates: 38°17′09″N 85°27′26″W

- Interactive map of Kentucky Correctional Institution for Women
- Location: 3000 Ash Avenue Pewee Valley, Kentucky
- Status: open
- Security class: mixed
- Capacity: 721
- Opened: 1938
- Managed by: Kentucky Department of Corrections
- Website: corrections.ky.gov/Facilities/AI/KCIW/

Kentucky Correctional Institution for Women (KCIW) is a prison located in unincorporated Shelby County, Kentucky, near Pewee Valley (in neighboring Oldham County, Kentucky), operated by the Kentucky Department of Corrections. Male and female inmates prior to 1937 had been housed at the Kentucky State Penitentiary in Frankfort; in 1912, the name was changed to Kentucky State Reformatory in Frankfort.

== Pine Bluff Prison Farm ==
A home for girls had been established in Shelby County, Kentucky in 1919 in Pine Bluff, Kentucky and maintained by the State. After World War I, lack of funding caused the project to be abandoned. This facility had been established by the Kentucky Federation of Women's Clubs. The State named this facility the Pine Bluff Prison Farm and the dedication was held November 4, 1938. November 1937 saw work starting on Kentucky's first prison for women at Pine Bluff on the 280-acre tract that had been deeded to the State by the Federation of Women's Clubs of Kentucky. The buildings also included an infirmary and administration building.

After the 1937 Ohio River flood, there were approximately 100 women convicts quartered in an old school building in Frankfort. The new prison would provide instruction in arts, crafts, needlework and domestic science. At the end of November 1937, work was started on a new Kentucky State women's prison set to cost $130,000.

== Superintendents & Wardens ==
Pine Bluff and Kentucky Correctional Institution of Women
| Superintendents & Wardens | In Office | Title | Additional information |
|---|---|---|---|
| Fanniebelle Sutherland | 1938 | Superintendent | A former police judge, appointed by Gov. A.B. "Happy" Chandler |
| Mrs. Ethel Penn Hannin | | Superintendent | |
| Lonnie Rowena Watson (1902–1989) | | Superintendent | |
| Gail S. Huecker | 1963 | Superintendent | |
| Betty Greenwell | 1968 | Superintendent | At age 26, Betty Greenwell may have been the youngest women prison warden in the US. |
| Doris Deuth | 1999-2006 | Warden | |
| Cookie Crews | 2006 | Warden | Commissioner of the Kentucky Department of Corrections since 2020. |
| Janet Conover | | Warden | |
| Vanessa Kennedy | | Warden | |

1964

== Legislation to change name ==
H.B. 367 – E. G. Brown. Amending K.R.S. 197.010 to define "penitentiaries" to include the State penal institutions for males at Eddyville and LaGrange, the institution for women located in Shelby County, together with the branches thereof and any other similar institutions hereafter established: changing the name of the institution for women to "The Kentucky Correctional Institution for Women"; requiring a female superintendent be appointed and listing required qualifications.

The name of Kentucky's female prison officially changed June 18, 1964. Prior to that date it had been a branch of the Kentucky State Reformatory in LaGrange.

== Accreditation ==
1983: The third Kentucky prison to receive accreditation by the American Correctional Association standards.

August 16, 2005: Otter Creek Correctional Complex in Wheelwright, Kentucky a private prison was leased by the state to help with the overcrowding conditions of the Kentucky Correctional Institution of Kentucky in Peewee Valley, Kentucky. Until the 2010 conversion of the Western Kentucky Correctional Complex into a women's prison, KCIW was the only state owned and operated women's prison in Kentucky. The prison continues to house all levels of inmates including all female death row inmates. It opened in 1938 and had a prison population of 721 as of 2007.

== Sexual misconduct ==
There have been reports and convictions of correctional officers in the prison sexually abusing and assaulting inmates. The institute has more male employees than females.

Female correctional officers have reported harassment by male coworkers. Corrections employees make up about 15% of all Kentucky state employees, but they make nearly 50% of all state sexual harassment complaints.

== Notable inmates ==
- Virginia Caudill – Caudill was convicted of the 1998 death of a 73-year-old female and sentenced to death. She is currently the only woman in Kentucky awaiting execution.
- LaFonda Faye Foster – Convicted (with Tina Hickey Powell) of five counts of intentional murder in Lexington on a spree one night. Sentenced to death but later resentenced to life without parole.
- Shayna Hubers – Convicted in 2018 of murdering her boyfriend Ryan Poston; given a life sentence with eligibility for parole after serving 20 years. She is eligible to apply for parole in 2032.
- Tina Hickey Powell – Convicted (with LaFonda Faye Foster) of five counts of intentional murder in Lexington; sentenced to life without the possibility of parole for 25 years.
