= Kentucky State Reformatory =

Medium-security prison

- Location in Kentucky
- Location: 3001 W Hwy 146, LaGrange, Kentucky; 38°24′13″N 85°24′57″W
- Status: open
- Security class: medium
- Capacity: 1,051
- Opened: 1939-1940
- Managed by: Kentucky Department of Corrections
- Warden: Anna Valentine
- Website: corrections.ky.gov/Facilities/AI/ksr/

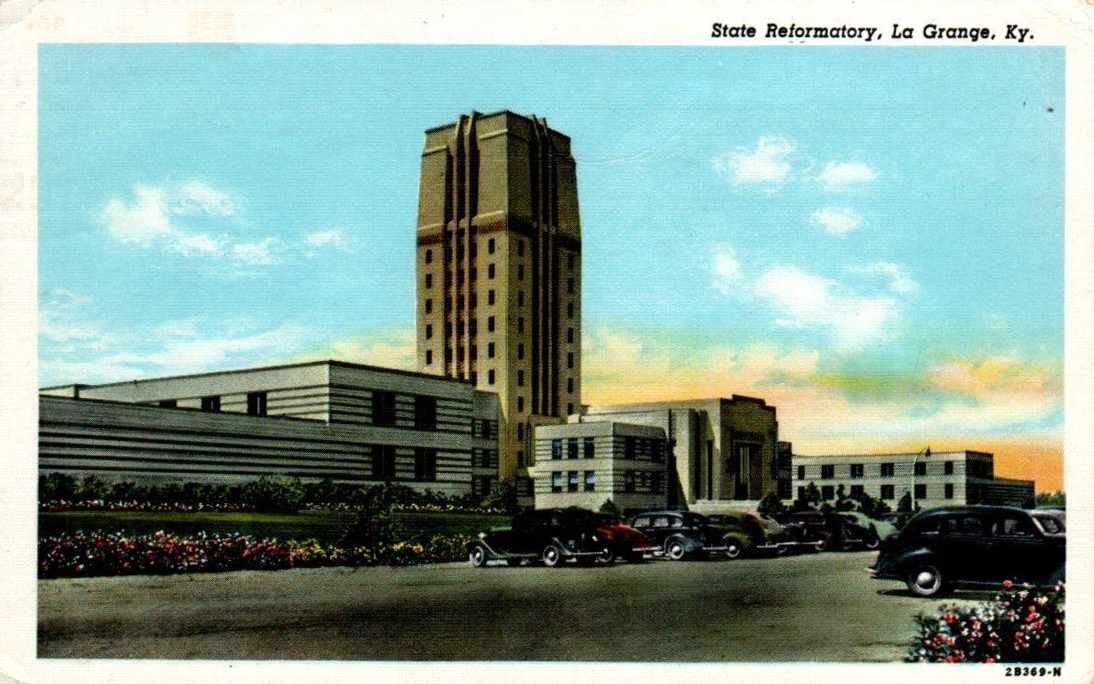
Kentucky State Reformatory La Grange, Ky. Postcard view, c. 1940

Kentucky State Reformatory (KSR) is a medium-security prison for adult males. The prison is located in unincorporated Oldham County, Kentucky, near La Grange, and about 30 miles (48 km) northeast of Louisville, in the United States. It opened in 1940 to replace the Kentucky State Penitentiary in Frankfort (later known as Kentucky State Reformatory) after a flood damaged the original property. As of 2024, the capacity of KSR is 1,051 inmates.

== History ==
Funds for the first prison in Kentucky were allocated in 1798. The small prison, housing 30 convicts, opened in 1800. The site chosen was Frankfort, Kentucky, the capital city. Through its 137 years of history, the population grew and more buildings added. Funds for a second prison had been allocated in 1879 to be called the "Branch Penitentiary" and to be located in Eddyville, Kentucky.

The names of these two prisons were referred to in this way until the Prison Reform Bill of 1910, passed by the General Assembly, changed the mode of management of the two prisons; making one "reform" and the other "penal." This reform bill included the changing of capital punishment from the gallows to the electric chair. Frankfort did not want the chair because of lack of room and curiosity seekers. Therefore, the Frankfort Penitentiary became known as Kentucky State Reformatory and the "Branch" was deleted from the name in Eddyville's prison and officially named Kentucky State Penitentiary.

By the time of the 1937 flood, that made this facility totally uninhabitable, there were 2,900 inmates, both male and female. The Kentucky Legislature of 1936 appropriated funds for erection of a new State "Medium Security" Institution to replace the Kentucky State Penitentiary in Frankfort /Reformatory. The cost had not yet been determined but was to be met from a Public Works Administration (P.W.A.) grant.

Governor A. B. Chandler ordered the Frankfort Reformatory abandoned because the flood had hastened its end. However, the pending program for building and rehabilitating State institutions included a new prison to replace it. The prisons were under the Welfare Department, with Commissioner of Welfare being Frederick A. Wallis.

== Site and Construction ==
March 1937: 2,884 acres in Oldham County was purchased by the State of Kentucky at a price of $141,033, or $48.53 per acre, for use as prison farm; construction of buildings, etc., and will cost approximately $1,500,000. Advertisement for Bids was advertised in local papers with a list of specifications. That same month, 200 prisoners arrived in Oldham County to work at the site of the new state prison.
A. L. Coupe Construction Company, Louisville, Kentucky, was awarded the contract by the State to construct six dormitory buildings at the new State prison farm near LaGrange.

Construction began in 1937 of the Kentucky State Reformatory in La Grange, as designed by William Strudwick Arrasmith. Other architects associated in the construction were Herman Wischmeyer, Oscar Joseph, Fred Elswick, Alfred Joseph, J. J. Curtis, Hugh Meriwether, J. T. Gillig, L. K. Frankel, H. A. Churchill, John Wilson of Lexington and McDermott, who directed the program. The State Reformatory was a model of social reform. The new prison has open-winged dormitories instead of the traditional individual cells. It was surrounded by 900 acres (3.6 km^{2}) [6] of the new state-owned farmland that the inmates manage. In addition to running the farm, the inmates also worked in the rock quarry nearby. The spacious new dormitories and farmland were designed to encourage prisoners to reform.
The Krause-Weilage Company of Louisville had the contract for air-conditioning the operating rooms in the hospital, in the Administration Building, and refrigeration equipment in the mess hall.

== From Temporary Barracks 1937 to Move in Day 1940 ==
When 200 of the prisoners from the Frankfort Reformatory arrived at the new site they were housed in tents much like they had lived after the flood in Frankfort. By June, they were building temporary barracks; i.e., mess hall, housing, administration, etc. Moving day from the temporary barracks, located about 800 yards away from the newly constructed structure occurred in March 1940. The buildings were on a 2,900-acre tract of land. At a cost of $2,500,000, sixteen buildings were reported to be of the best in modern prisons.

== Wardens Kentucky State Reformatory ==
James W. Hammond —1936-1944--
A. S. Nunn —1944 – 1945--
Francis S. Kiernen —Jun 1945 – Dec 1948--
Renald L. Whaley —Dec. 1948- Nov 1951--
Porter B. Lady —Mar 1952 -Mach 1956—He had been deputy warden one year prior.
Dan Gray —Mar 1956 Jan 1960—KSR was first prison to have a nine-hole golf course. Golf course built 1957.
David S. Davis —Jan 1960 – July 1965--
Harold E. Black —July 1965 – Jan 1966—Acting Warden after Davis resigned.
Martin J. Wiman —Jan 1966 June 1967--
James E. Howard —Mar 1967 Nov 1970—1967: No longer called wardens – now known as superintendents
Harold E. Black —Nov 1970 – Aug 1977--
Dewey Sowders —Aug 1977- Jan 1979 --
Stephen T. Smith —Jan 1979-1980 --
John D. Rees —1980 – 1986 -- -Later John Rees became Commissioner of the Kentucky Department of Corrections 2004–2008.
Betty Kassulke —Jul 1986 – Oct 1986—Interim warden 1986
Al Parke —1986 – 1992--
Walter Chapleau —1992 – 1995--
William "Bill" Seabold —1996 – 2003--
Larry Chandler —2003-2008 —Had previously been warden of Luther Luckett Correctional Complex. July 2020 Larry Chandler Named Warden of the new prison Southern State Correctional Complex (SSCC), Wheelwright, Kentucky
J. David Donahue —2008 – 2009--
Cookie Crews —2009 – 2012–2012 Cookie Crew was promoted to health services administrator. 2020 Cookie Crews named Kentucky Department of Corrections Commissioner.
Clark J. Taylor —2012 – 2014—Retires as warden at KSR in 2014
Aaron B. Smith —2014 – 2018--
Anna L. Valentine —2018 – current

== Forensic Psychiatric Unit ==
October 1, 1975 an announcement was made that a forensic psychiatric care unit would be built and operated at LaGrange State Reformatory by Gov. Julian Carroll. The unit was authorized by the 1972 General Assembly. It had been planned for Central State Hospital but that facility was later leased to a private organization. The new facility to be jointly operated by Departments of Justice and Human Resources to provide psychiatric examination for persons needing that service prior to a court appearance.

== Consent decree ==
=== Consent decree ===
On August 25, 1976 Jerald L. Kendrick, serving time at the Kentucky State Penitentiary, prepared a 40-page lawsuit and filed it in U.S. District Court at Paducah. Kendrick et al. vs. David H. Bland, et al. and James M. Thompson, et al. vs. David H. Bland, became a precedent for the handling of state prisoners. A settlement was reached on April 4, 1980 by U.S. District Judge Edward Johnstone of Princeton. Three prisons would have to come into compliance; Reformatory, Penitentiary and Kentucky Correctional Institution for Women.

The decree set out in the agreement that the state spend nearly $50 million over a four or five year time to satisfy just some of the complaints that Kendrick raised in his suit. That figure did not include $22 million that had already been spent on a new medium-security prison scheduled to open Fall of 1980 near the Reformatory.

John D. Rees, was hired as warden by Department of Corrections Commissioner, George Wilson, to bring Kentucky State Reformatory into compliance under the Federal Consent Decree issued by U.S. District Judge Edward Johnstone.

Among other changes at the Kentucky State Reformatory, the consent decree:

1. Capped the population at 1,200, thus requiring a reduction in the number of inmates by 600.
2. Banned double bunks in the dormitories.
3. Called for a three-step living skills program that educated inmates on how to make healthy decisions in prison and how to transition from confinement into life outside prison.
4. Called for additional educational and vocational programs.
5. Required the Reformatory to open a law library containing public federal documents including current Supreme Court rulings and federal statutes as well as current Kentucky State legal documents.
6. Ordered the improvement of medical and mental health services and implemented more staff training.
7. Called for a new visitation building.
8. Mandated specialized training programs for staff as well as a 20% pay raise for corrections officers.

In March 1992, Judge Edward Johnstone ruled that the Kentucky State Reformatory had complied with the requirements of the consent decree.

=== Accreditation ===
Warden John Rees led the Kentucky State Reformatory to its initial ACA accreditation in 1982, the first facility to be accredited in Kentucky and its successful reaccreditation in 1985.

== KSR programs ==
The Kentucky State Reformatory uses a unit management system. Inmates and staff are separated into smaller groups or units. The staff members of each unit include a unit manager, an assistant unit manager, correctional officers, engineering staff, and classification and treatment officers. According to the Kentucky Department of Corrections, the purpose of the unit team is to help inmates with issues such as institutional programming, parole board preparation, classification reviews, and developing release plans. The Kentucky State Reformatory also offers academic programs. The academic courses include adult basic education, GED preparation and college courses.

== Chicken Hill - Prison Cemetery ==
The prison grounds contain a paupers' cemetery for unclaimed or indigent inmate remains.

== Notable inmates ==
Inmate Name	Register Number	Status	Details
Gregory Allen Bush	277512 / 315757	Serving a life sentence without parole.	Perpetrator of the 2018 Jeffersontown shooting in which he murdered Maurice E. Stallard and Vickie Lee Jones at a Kroger store.
Michael Adam Carneal	246005 / 151127	Sentenced to life with possible parole after 25 years, which was not granted in 2022.	Culprit of the 1997 Heath High School shooting in which he murdered 3 and injured another 5.
Gary Scott Pennington	234096 / 119687	Currently listed as serving 420 years.	Perpetrator of the 1993 East Carter High School shooting in which he murdered two teachers.

- Harry Edward Greenwell – posthumously identified as the "I-65 Killer." Released in 1983 after serving time for burglary and escape.
- Steve Nunn – former member of the Kentucky House of Representatives and son of former Kentucky governor Louie B. Nunn. Serving life sentence for murdering his former fiancée. Currently incarcerated at the Little Sandy Correctional Complex in Sandy Hook.
- Dustin McPhetridge - appeared on To Catch a Predator. Incarcerated from 2007 to 2009.

== Sources ==
- Colvin, Mark. Penitentiaries, Reformatories, and Chain Gangs, New York: St. Martin's Press, 1997.
- Hayes, Fred E. American Prison System, New York: McGraw-Hill Book Company, 1939.
- Garett, Paul and Austin MacCormick The Handbook of American Prisons, NY: National Society of Penal information, Inc., 1928
- McKelvey, Blake. American Prisons, Chicago: The University of Chicago Press, 1936.
- 1981 Supreme Court Case Consent Decree of Kentucky State Penitentiary
- 2008 Overview of Kentucky State Reformatory, Kentucky Department of Corrections
- "Assessing Correctional Education Programs: The Student's Perspective", The Journal of Correctional Education
