= Kentucky State Penitentiary in Frankfort =

First prison in Kentucky (1800–1937)

Kentucky State Penitentiary Frankfort
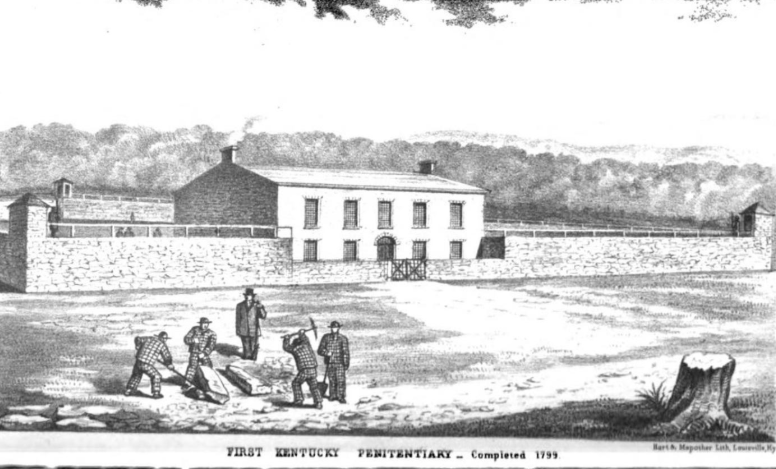
- The prison in 1860
- Interactive map of the Kentucky State Penitentiary Frankfort area

General information
- Location: Frankfort, Kentucky
- Coordinates: 38.1998°N 84.8719°W
- Groundbreaking: 1798
- Opened: 1800
- Closed: 1937
- Demolished: 1950

The Kentucky State Penitentiary in Frankfort was an American prison. It was the first prison built west of the Allegheny Mountains and completed on June 22, 1800, when Kentucky was still virtually a wilderness. The Kentucky Legislature of 1798 had appointed Harry Innes, Alexander S. Bullitt, Caleb Wallace, Isaac Shelby and John Coburn as commissioners to choose a location for a “penitentiary house.” The house was described "to be built of brick, or stone, containing cells, workshops, with an outside wall high enough and strong enough to keep the prisoners from getting away." The site chosen was Frankfort, Kentucky. Henry Innis, one of the commission, gave one acre of land and the legislature appropriated $500 towards its building with more funds to be allocated later.

This prison was known as the Kentucky Penitentiary until the 1910 Prison Reform bill passed March 1, 1910: This bill included that one institution be penal and the other reform; the changing of its mode of Capital Punishment from the gallows to the use of an electric chair, and included that the electric chair be kept in a "penitentiary," and that a "Death House" to be built. The electric chair was installed at the Branch Penitentiary September 1910. All convicts under 30 years of age with minor crimes should be kept in a reformatory and those over 30 years of age should be kept in a penitentiary.

The prison's history ended in January 1937 when a flood ravaged towns and cities all along the Ohio River and the trans-Mississippi River Valley wreaking havoc in its wake. The old Frankfort prison was among its victims. The flood made the prison uninhabitable. The State had appropriated funds the previous year (1936) for the building of a new prison to ease the overcrowding. No one predicted a flood would hasten the process.

== Contractor ==
Colonel Richard Taylor was the contractor hired for building the new prison.

== Keepers of the penitentiary 1800 – 1860 ==
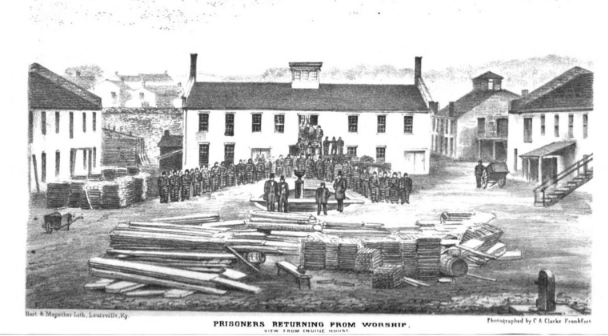
Kentucky State Penitentiary in Frankfort bet 1846–1860

John Stuart Hunter −1800-1806 – Reported to six inspectors. 1800–1806 – Governor appointed the Keeper and the Keeper's pay was an annual salary.

Samuel Taylor – 1806 -1810 Six inspectors were disposed.

John Glover- 1810–1815 In 1813, the State advanced $5,000 to buy nail-iron. There was no other prison of the kind west of the Alleghenies, none nearer than Virginia and Philadelphia. The problems of industrial management in prisons were new, and without clear precedents.

Anderson Miller −1815-1816-

William Starling- 1816-1819-

William Hardin −1819-1825—When William Hardin left in 1825, the State was in debt to him in the amount of $2,307.61. The 1825 act of Legislature authorized the Governor to appoint the keeper on a partnership principle and this constituted a basis of a contract between the state and the keeper.

Joel Scott −1825-1834—Scott became known as the institution reformer of his day. When he took charge, the inmates were in a deplorable condition, filthy and diseased. There were 84 convicts in the state penitentiary in 1825.

1825–1856 – In 1825 the principle changes and the state enters into a partnership contract. The General Assembly of 1825 loaned the Keeper $6000 to run the institution. The Keeper was to pay back this amount plus 6% interest at the end of his term. The Keeper was to receive ½ of the net profit of sales from inmate made goods plus guarantees the state $1,000 profit.

Thomas S. Theobald −1834-1844

Newton Craig and Col. William Henry −1844-1855-
1848 – Both houses of legislature voted to elect a keeper of the penitentiary for the next six years: The law made him a partner of the State in the profits of the institution. The keeper to have one-third the profits, and the State two-thirds; but the keeper had to guarantee that the annual profits of the State not be less than $5000. The State to furnish the penitentiary, work-shops, machinery, clerk, capital, and convicts, and therefore receives the stipulated sum annually...There were two or three candidates for the office.

Zebulon Ward −1854-1859 – Calvin Fairbank described Zeb Ward as one of the strangest men he ever knew; physically handsome, sonically magnetic, and utterly devoid of heart or conscient. He was a gambler, libertine and murderer, all under the cover of the law. Ward leased the prison at $6,000 a year and made $100,000 out of the lease in four years. Fairbank stated: "To do this he literally killed 250 out of 375 prisoners."

Jeremiah South −1859-1862

Harry Todd --1862-1871–30 Females and 500 males in the Kentucky Penitentiary 1856–1880 – The prison was under the Sinking Fund in the 1870s

Jeremiah South −1871-1880 Feb 1878 the Kentucky General Assembly discussed the bill to abolish the lease system in favor of the warden system.

1880 – Lesseeship terminates and the State takes back control of the prisons.

== Wardens 1880–1937 ==
W. S. Stone --1880-1882--

Harry Todd --1882-1884--

J. Proctor Knott—1884-1884--

W. T. Barry South --1884-1885--

E. H. Taylor --1885-1890--

M. P. Bolan --1890-1892--

Sam A. Norman --1892-1893--
Resigned as warden to take over the State's Chari Factory in the Penitentiary

Henry George --1893-1895—Senator from Graves County succeeded Norman

Dr. E. M. Nell --1895-1896—He had been a State Senator from Adair County. Died in office.

Maj. R. A. Hancock --1896-1898--

Ephraim T. Lillard --1898-1906—Resigned

W.S. Hawkins --1906-1907—Temporary Warden

George P. Chinn --1907-1908--

E. E. Mudd --1908-1913--

A.J.G. Wells --1913-1916–1914 – 460 acres belonging to Mrs. Mastin, Frankfort, Kentucky was leased by the State for a prison farm at $3,000 year.

J. Mack Phythian --1916-1920—Resigned due to ill health

L.R. Davis—1920 – --

W. H. Moyer --1920-1921–1921: Convicts go on salary, increase more work, per Superintendent Moyer. Increase in volume and quality of work improved.

H.V. Bastin --1921-1925–1922: Open air dormitory to be constructed at the Reformatory. By using the ward system instead of cells would accommodate 500 prisoners.

Herbert M. Beard --August 5, 1925 – 1929—Died of pneumonia 20 Nov 1929; appointed Warden of the reformatory by the State Board of Charities and Corrections under Gov. William J. Fields.

W. M. Roach—1930 --- Acting Warden after Beard's death.

James Hammond --1937 – --

Major Joseph M. Kelly – Warden Tent City--

Female Matrons in charge of women at Kentucky State Penitentiary in Frankfort
Name	Title	Tenure	Notes
Mrs. Hanley	1906	Matron	From Mason County
Mrs. E. E. Mudd	1913	Matron	Widow of the late warden, appointed by the Prison Commission
Mrs. Elizabeth Ruff	1920	Matron	Mrs. Ruff was housekeeper for Capital Hotel for a number of years.
Mrs. Bowen Henry	1932	Matron	

== 1838 Prison Towers ==
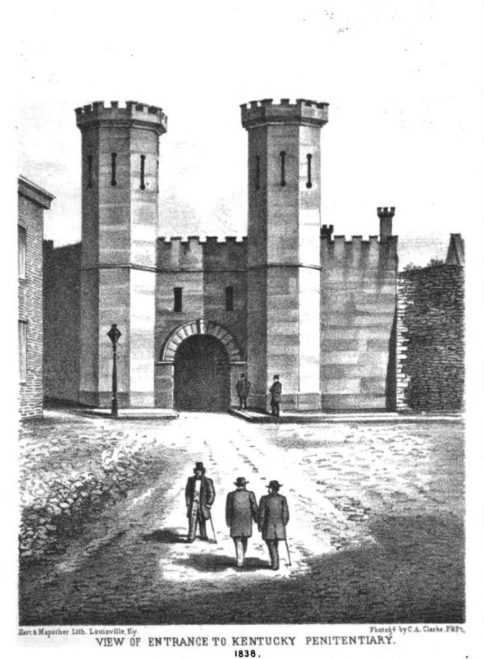
Kentucky Penitentiary Entrance Towers 1838

The towers at the entrance of the Frankfort Penitentiary were built between 1835–1837 and were torn down November 1950. Referred to as Norman towers, said to have been copies of Caesar's Tower and Guy's Tower of Warwick Castle, England. Ironically, the Frankfort Penitentiary would hold 30 British prisoners during the War of 1812. The Gothic style entrance was at the intersection of High and Mero Streets, adjacent to Holmes Street.

== 1844 Prison Fire ==
On August 30, 1844, a prison fire started in the penitentiary. All the wood buildings within the walls were consumed; no convicts escaped during the fire. The wagons, and a few manufactures were saved but the shops, machinery, tools, unfinished manufactures, were consumed. The prisoners were unharmed.

== 1865 Act ==
1865 General Assembly Chapter 1868 – An Act for the benefit (erection of buildings) of the Kentucky Penitentiary

Capt. H. I. Todd, Keeper of the Penitentiary was the only bid for the erection of a work-shop, chapel, dining room, smoke house, steam heating for workshop, and steam engine boilers &c. to be built on the penitentiary grounds per the passage of Chapter 1868 Act of the General Assembly in which $98,917.26 had been appropriated. Capt. Todd chose H. B. Bradshaw & Brother, architects.

== Branch Penitentiary ==
In 1876 a Branch Penitentiary was called for but did not pass in the General Assembly.

== 1910 Prison Reform ==
- Striped uniforms exchanged for light blue clothing
- Electric chair voted to be the means of capital punishment The electric chair was installed at Eddyville penitentiary September 1910. The Frankfort Penitentiary would soon be called Reformatory.
- Change in the Parole law.
- Frankfort Penitentiary to be known as the Kentucky State Reformatory
- Eddyville "Branch Penitentiary" to be known as Kentucky State Penitentiary
- Men under 30 years of age to be in the Kentucky State Reformatory
- Men over 30 years of age to be placed at Kentucky State Penitentiary, Eddyville, Kentucky.

The Frankfort Penitentiary did not want the interference of curiosity seekers who would want to see the "chair." Frankfort penitentiary had 10 visitors to one visitor at the branch prison

== First prisoner ==
Three months after the penitentiary opened, in September 1800, John Turner from Madison County, Kentucky, was arrested for horse stealing.
The first female may have been Rachel Miller, a convict from Lexington received at the penitentiary March 1804. If so, she would have been the first woman confined at the prison. Records show she had been received at the penitentiary.

== Youngest prisoners ==
Sam Dodd – Age 8, was the youngest prisoner sent to the Frankfort Penitentiary. Sentenced in 1893 for one year grand larceny.

Linville Combs – From Breathitt County, Kentucky; age 11, received a life sentence for killing his 3-year-old sister, Nannie Belle Combs in 1888.

== Notable prisoners ==
Grace Browder – First Woman Bank Robber to ever be sent to the state reformatory started a 20-year prison sentence March 7, 1929; convicted from Daviess County. She was a member of a gang that attempted to hold up the West Louisville bank using a machine gun.

Calvin Fairbank – Abolitionist

Delia Webster – Abolitionist

Elijah Anderson – Free black Abolitionist

== Permanent closure after flood of 1937 ==
In January 1937, the Ohio and Kentucky Rivers flooded, cresting at over 48 feet and submerging half of Frankfort including the grounds of the prison.

There was high drama when the water lapped around the Penitentiary and the convicts were transferred to second-story cells. Frightened convicts reacted in different ways; some rioting took place between blacks and whites; some convicts attempted to escape by jumping into the icy waters that swirled around the prison. With nearly three thousand prisoners in the antiquated facility, area residents became understandably uneasy. The situation eased as the governor pardoned several hundred lower offenders and sent many of the remainder to the grounds of the Feeble-Minded Institute, to jails in Lexington, and elsewhere. The flood accomplished what reformers were unable to do as the prison was closed.

National Guardsmen and state police oversaw the ferrying of prisoners by boat to dry land, and bused to their destinations. A prison camp was hastily built of barbed wire and tents on a high hill about a mile away, taking about a week and constructed with lighting, heating and sanitary facilities. Until the camp was ready, many of the men were sent to jails in Lexington, Winchester, Mount Sterling, Georgetown, Owenton, Lawrenceburg, Lebanon, Harrodsburg, Danville, Williamstown, Richmond, and about 800 men were housed in the Frankfort Armory. The ill were sent to the Federal Narcotics Farm at Lexington, and women prisoners were transferred to the old prison school building (until a new facility was constructed the following year in neighboring Shelby County, Kentucky Correctional Institute for Women). When the camp was completed, the men were transported back.

Governor A. B. Chandler ordered the Frankfort prison permanently closed.

In 1936, the General Assembly had approved the construction of a new prison in La Grange, Kentucky, not knowing that the construction would have to be hastened by the 1937 flood. The Frankfort prison camp was closed when the prisoners were transferred to a similar camp in La Grange, awaiting the construction of that facility, the new Kentucky State Reformatory.
