= WKCC =

WKCC may refer to:

- WKCC (FM), a radio station (107.5 FM) licensed to serve Chatham, Massachusetts, United States
- WLGA (FM), a radio station (90.5 FM) licensed to serve Columbus, Georgia, which held the call sign WKCC from 2019 to 2026
- WBEK (FM), a radio station (91.1 FM) licensed to serve Kankakee, Illinois, which held the call sign WKCC from 2003 to 2016
- Western Kentucky Correctional Complex, a prison in Kentucky
