= KCIW =

KCIW may refer to:

- KCIW-LP, a low-power radio station (100.7 FM) licensed to serve Brookings, Oregon, United States
- Kentucky Correctional Institute for Women
