= Murder of Ryan Poston =

Murder of an American attorney

- Victim Ryan Poston
- Location: Highland Heights, Kentucky, U.S.
- Date: October 12, 2012; 14 years ago
- Attack type: Murder by shooting
- Victims: Ryan Carter Poston, aged 29
- Perpetrator: Shayna Michelle Hubers
- Motive: Jealousy, obsession
- Verdict: Guilty (both trials)
- Convictions: Murder
- Sentence: Life imprisonment with the possibility of parole after 20 years (previously 40 years in prison)

On October 12, 2012, Ryan Carter Poston, an American attorney from Fort Mitchell, Kentucky, was shot to death by his on-again, off-again girlfriend Shayna Michelle Hubers. After a trial in the Campbell County circuit court, Hubers was convicted of murder on April 23, 2015. She was sentenced to 40 years in the Kentucky Department of Corrections on August 14, 2015, with parole eligibility after 20 years. On August 25, 2016, Hubers' conviction was overturned on appeal when one of the jurors in her murder trial was revealed to be a convicted felon. Hubers was convicted of murder during her second trial on August 28, 2018. On October 18, 2018, she was sentenced to life imprisonment with parole eligibility after 20 years.

== Background ==
Ryan Carter Poston was born on December 30, 1982, in Fort Mitchell, Kentucky, to Lisa Carter and Jay Poston. He had three younger sisters: Alison, Katherine, and Elizabeth Carter. Poston attended Blessed Sacrament School (Fort Mitchell), the International School Manila (Philippines), and the International School of Geneva (Switzerland) during high school. He graduated from Indiana University in 2005, where he triple-majored in history, geography, and political science, then went to law school at Northern Kentucky University in Highland Heights. After completing his Juris Doctor degree, Poston began working as an attorney in Cincinnati, Ohio.

In 2011, Poston, who was 28 years old at the time, met 20-year-old Shayna Hubers on Facebook. Hubers was friends with Poston's step-cousin, Carissa Carlisle. Poston and Hubers began dating soon after. At the time they began dating, Hubers was a psychology student at the University of Kentucky in Lexington, approximately 80 miles from Highland Heights. She graduated cum laude and was pursuing a master's degree in school counseling. The couple reportedly had a volatile relationship, and broke up several times over an 18-month period. On the night of his murder, Poston had a date with Audrey Bolte, winner of Miss Ohio USA 2012.

== Murder ==
On October 12, 2012, Hubers called 9-1-1 to report that she killed Poston in his Highland Heights condominium. Hubers shot Poston six times, but she continually maintained that the killing was in self-defense. That night, during her interrogation, she alleged that her relationship with Poston had been abusive. Although she was read her Miranda rights, Hubers voluntarily spoke to police. When explaining the details of their relationship, she described Poston as "very vain" and implied that by shooting him in the face she "gave him the nose job he always wanted." She also made other statements, such as, "I don't know if anyone will ever want to marry me if they know that I killed a boyfriend in self-defense." After being left alone in the interrogation room for several hours, Hubers began pacing, dancing around the room, and singing "Amazing Grace". She also said aloud, "I did it. Yes, I did it. I can't believe I did that" and, "I'm so good at acting." Hubers was arrested for murder and was held on a $3,000,000 bond.

A Mass of Christian Burial for Poston was held at Blessed Sacrament Church in Fort Mitchell, Kentucky. He was buried in St. John's Cemetery in Fort Mitchell.

== First trial ==
Shayna Hubers
- Born: Shayna Michelle Hubers; April 8, 1991 (age 35); Lexington, Kentucky, U.S.
- Status: Incarcerated at Kentucky Correctional Institution for Women, eligible for parole on September 16, 2032
- Criminal charge: Murder
- Penalty: Life imprisonment with the possibility of parole

Hubers was indicted for Poston's murder on December 20, 2012. On January 16, 2013, she entered a plea of not guilty to the murder charges. Two-and-a-half years after the incident, Hubers' murder trial began on April 13, 2015. She had remained in the Campbell County jail since her arrest, unable to meet her 3 million dollar bail.

Prosecutors argued that the motive for the murder was that Poston wanted to permanently end the couple's relationship. Defense attorneys continued with their contention that the shooting was in self-defense and that Hubers was a victim of domestic abuse. As part of their case, the prosecution, led by Michelle Snodgrass, put on text message evidence that showed Hubers' obsession with Poston. Several witnesses, including Poston's family members, Audrey Bolte, and Hubers' former cellmate, testified for the prosecution.

Carissa Carlisle, through whom Poston met Hubers, testified that her cousin was trying to avoid conflict with Hubers, and she read a series of text messages she had exchanged with Poston prior to his death. Poston's stepfather Peter Carter testified that, the day before his son's death, Poston confided in Carter about an upcoming date with Bolte, and was afraid to tell Hubers about it. The date was for the following night, on which Poston was killed. Bolte stated that, on the night of the murder, she and Poston planned to meet at a Milford, Ohio, bar for drinks at 9:30 and that she had been looking forward to it, but that Poston had failed to show up. Hubers' former cellmate, Cecily Miller, also testified, where she said that Hubers bragged about killing her boyfriend, saying that she laughed "about shooting [Poston] in the face and giving him the nose job he always wanted." Miller also said that Hubers discussed legal strategy with her, saying she "was going to plead insanity, but she was too smart because she has the IQ of Einstein. So she was going to plead battered wife syndrome."

Hubers did not take the stand in her own defense, but relied on her police interrogation tape in which she maintained the killing was in self-defense.

== Verdict ==
On April 23, 2015, after five hours of jury deliberation, Hubers was found guilty of Poston's murder. Following the verdict, the jury recommended a 40-year prison sentence. Hubers' attorneys argued for a new trial, stating that they were not allowed to present evidence and witnesses that would have shown Hubers killed Poston in self-defense. Her attorneys also asked the judge to recognize Hubers as a victim of domestic violence, which would reduce the amount of time she would be required to serve before becoming eligible for parole. Under state law, Hubers would be required to serve 75 percent, or 34 years, of her term before becoming eligible for parole, but her attorneys' motion would require her to only serve 20 percent of her sentence before she could be released.

Four months after being convicted, Hubers was sentenced to 40 years in prison with parole eligibility after 20 years as per the jury's recommendation. The presiding judge also declared that he did not believe that Hubers was a victim of domestic violence and that he had considered a sentence greater than 40 years.

== Appeal ==
External videos
- New trial for Shayna Hubers delayed until 2018; WCPO.com | ABC9

Following her sentencing, Hubers moved for a new trial. It was granted on August 27, 2016, overturning her conviction on the basis that one of her jurors concealed a felony conviction; Kentucky law prohibits convicted felons from serving on juries. Hubers' new trial was set to begin on September 18, 2017, but was delayed for four months to January 16, 2018. Hubers' new out-of-state attorney asked for, and was granted, a six-month delay to allow him time to prepare for the re-trial. Hubers' second trial began on August 8, 2018.

== Second trial ==
In Hubers' second trial, she took the stand and gave lurid details of her sexual relationship with Poston. The defense built its case around the assertion that Poston was an abusive boyfriend. After five hours of deliberation, a jury again found Hubers guilty of murder. She was sentenced to life imprisonment with the possibility of parole. Hubers will have to serve 17 years before she can be considered for parole in 2032; she is incarcerated at Kentucky Correctional Institute for Women in Pewee Valley, Kentucky.

Hubers married a transgender woman fellow inmate, Unique Taylor, in a two-minute jailhouse ceremony on June 7, 2018. In March 2019, it was reported that a judge had granted Hubers a divorce.

== In the media ==
Poston's murder has been featured on several television programs, including ABC's 20/20, CBS's 48 Hours, Oxygen's Snapped and It Takes a Killer. The case was also covered by the podcast Small Town Murder in an episode titled “Never Sing Your Confession.”

The podcast Women & Crime covered the case in a July 27, 2021 episode.

The case was featured in Bailey Sarian's "Murder, Mystery and Makeup" YouTube series on October 13, 2025.

On April 3, 2026, the Women & Crime podcast revisited the case with recent updates since their original 2021 episode.
