= 2018 Jeffersontown shooting =

White supremacist terror attack against African Americans

- Location: Jeffersontown, Kentucky, U.S.
- Date: October 24, 2018; 8 years ago 2:30 pm (EDT; UTC−04:00)
- Attack type: Shooting, shootout
- Weapon: Smith & Wesson Model 411 .40 caliber semi-automatic pistol
- Deaths: 2
- Perpetrator: Gregory A. Bush
- Motive: Anti-black racism

On October 24, 2018, a man and woman were shot and killed by a gunman at a Kroger grocery store in Jeffersontown, Kentucky, a suburb of Louisville.

The perpetrator, Gregory A. Bush, age 51, born in 1967, also exchanged gunfire with a bystander outside the store. After his arrest, Bush was initially charged in state court with two counts of murder and ten counts of wanton endangerment, and held on $5 million bail.

On November 15, 2018, a federal grand jury in the Western District of Kentucky indicted Bush on six counts: three hate crime charges and three firearms offenses. He was revealed to have made many online postings that were racially discriminatory. At a court hearing in July 2019, Bush was found mentally competent to stand trial following a psychiatric evaluation. On December 15, 2020, Bush was sentenced to life in prison without parole.

== Incident ==
According to Jeffersontown police, Bush had earlier on October 24 tried to enter a service of the First Baptist Church of Jeffersontown, a predominately black church. He was stopped by its locked doors. Police and church leaders said a surveillance video had recorded Bush's attempt.

Between ten and fifteen minutes later in mid-afternoon, police say Bush entered the Kroger store, where he fatally shot Maurice E. Stallard, aged 69. He went outside and fatally shot Vickie Lee Jones, aged 67, who was in the parking lot. Both victims were African American. Bush also exchanged gunfire with a bystander, who had seen him shoot Jones. Another man said Bush told him, "Don't shoot me. I won't shoot you. Whites don't shoot whites" before the gunman fled. He was caught and arrested by police, who arrived four minutes after being called.

== Perpetrator ==
Gregory Alan Bush was arrested by Jeffersontown police as the suspect. Bush was living in Jeffersontown at the time of the attack. He got married in 1997, they had a child in 1998, but then they separated in 1999 and divorced in 2000. According to the local police chief, Bush had a history of mental illness and domestic violence; in a 2001 incident his ex-wife (who is black) gained an emergency protective order against him; during an altercation he twice used a racial epithet against her. By this order he was barred for three years from having or buying guns. In January 2009, as a result of domestic violence against his parents, with whom Bush was living, the judge ordered him to "surrender his guns and undergo mental health treatment." Bush had attacked his father and threatened to kill his parents.

In relation to the Kroger shooting, the Louisville police chief described it as a hate crime motivated by Bush's racism.

The New York Times published a quote from a Facebook page appearing to belong to Bush: "My paranoid-schizophrenia finally stopped me from working and now am on mental disability. I'm lucky I made it this far with all the trouble I've caused myself when I get off my medicine."

Tommy Juanso, an attorney and former friend of Bush, had said that his friend's rhetoric had become increasingly vitriolic during the heated 2016 presidential campaign and the political polarization it created. Juanso is biracial and said that Bush mocked him, calling him "The Big O" (referring to President Barack Obama). In Bush's social media accounts, such as Twitter, he had posted frequently about black-on-black crime and made racial insults.

== Legal proceedings ==
Shortly after his arrest, Bush was charged by Kentucky state prosecutors with two counts of murder and ten counts of first-degree wanton endangerment. On October 31, a Jefferson County grand jury indicted Bush on two counts of murder, one count of criminal attempted murder [the gunfight with the bystander who attempted to subdue him] and two counts of wanton endangerment.

U.S. Attorney Russell Coleman released a statement on October 31, that the US Attorney's Office and the FBI were "collecting the evidence necessary" to potentially charge Bush with possible violations of federal law, "which includes potential civil rights violations such as hate crimes." On November 15, 2018, a grand jury in the Western District of Kentucky indicted Bush for three federal hate crime charges—two counts of shooting or killing a victim based on race or color, and one count of attempting to shoot or kill a victim based on race or color—and three firearms offenses.

At a July 2019 preliminary hearing, prosecutors said that a Kentucky Correctional Psychiatric Center report found Bush competent to stand trial on charges stemming from the shooting. Bush has pleaded not guilty to charges of murder, attempted murder, and wanton endangerment. In November 2019, Bush returned to court and both the prosecutor and defense agreed for him to be sent back to Kentucky Correctional Psychiatric Center for more mental health treatment.

On December 15, 2020, Bush was sentenced to life in prison without parole after pleading guilty to the shooting. He is currently being held at the Luther Luckett Correctional Complex in La Grange, Kentucky.

== Aftermath ==
Shortly after the incident, Kentucky State Representatives Jason Nemes and Jerry Miller pre-filed a bill to supplement the state's hate-crime law. The bill calls for a person to be charged with a hate crime, in addition to the homicide charge, if the crime was found to be motivated by "race, color, religion, sexual orientation or national origin." They added criminal homicide and fetal homicide as crimes to be covered as hate crimes.

Many politicians cautioned that law enforcement investigations needed to be completed before the shootings could be classified as a hate crime. The Kroger shooting was followed by a mass shooting at a synagogue in Squirrel Hill, a neighborhood of Pittsburgh, Pennsylvania. Referring to both crimes, Senate Minority Leader Mitch McConnell released a statement saying, "If these aren't definitions of hate crimes, I don't know what a hate crime is." He called for Bush to receive the death penalty if convicted of the charges.

Many activist groups, such as Kentucky Alliance Against Racist and Political Repression and Showing Up for Racial Justice, met with local politicians to urge that Bush be charged with a hate crime. They expressed concern that he might escape justice by using mental illness as a defense. As one member told officials, "Mental illness does not prompt you to wake up wanting to kill black people. Mental illness does not discriminate as this man did." According to CNN, the event was one of three hate-motivated events that took place in the United States the same week, along with a shooting at a synagogue in Pittsburgh and a series of mail bombing attempts.

An interfaith moment of silence for memorial and unity was declared by mayor Greg Fischer of Louisville on October 31 in remembrance of those persons killed at the Kroger grocery and the eleven victims at the Pittsburgh synagogue.

== See also ==
- Hate crime laws in the United States
- Pittsburgh synagogue shooting
- Charleston church shooting
- 2018 Tallahassee shooting
