= Calvin Fairbank =

19th-century American abolitionist and Methodist minister

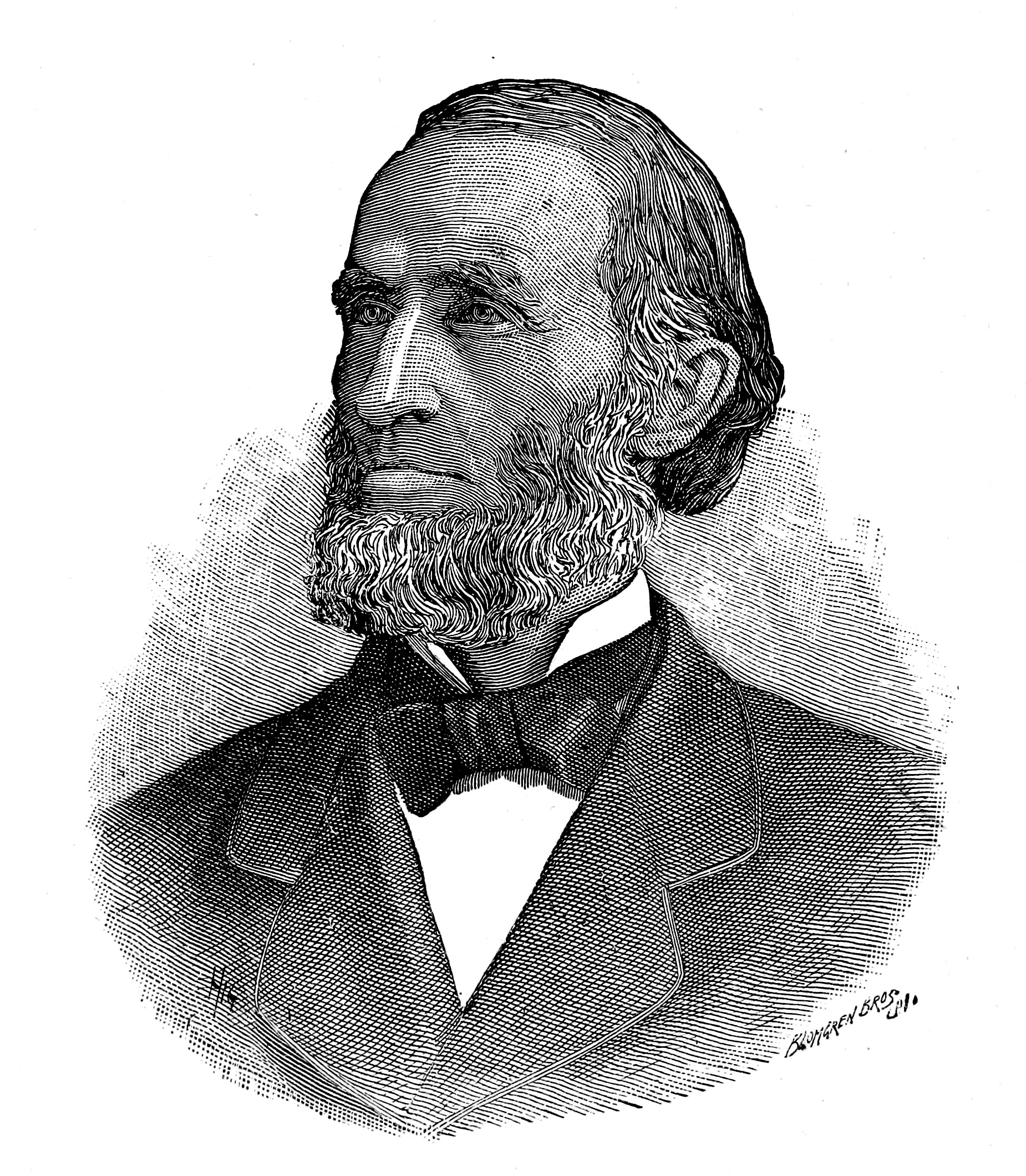
- Rev. Calvin Fairbank
- Born: November 3, 1816; Pike, New York, U.S.
- Died: October 12, 1898 (aged 81); Angelica, New York, U.S.
- Resting place: Until The Day Dawn Cemetery
- Education: Oberlin College
- Occupations: Methodist minister, abolitionist
- Notable work: Rev. Calvin Fairbank During Slavery Times
- Spouses: Mandana Tileston; Adeline Winegar

Calvin Fairbank (November 3, 1816 – October 12, 1898) was an American abolitionist and Methodist minister from New York state who was twice convicted in Kentucky of aiding the escape of slaves, and served a total of 19 years in the Kentucky State Penitentiary in Frankfort. Fairbank is believed to have aided the escape of 47 slaves.

Pardoned in 1849 after four years of his first sentence, Fairbank returned to his Underground Railroad work. He was arrested in 1851 with the aid of the governor of Indiana, who was enforcing the Fugitive Slave Law of 1850. Fairbank was convicted again in Kentucky and served the full sentence of 15 years.

== Early life ==
Calvin Fairbank was born in 1816 in Pike, in what is now Wyoming County, New York, to Chester Fairbank and his wife; he grew up in an intensely religious family environment. It was also the period of the Second Great Awakening, and western New York was a center of evangelical activity. Listening to the stories told by two escaped slaves whom he met at a Methodist quarterly meeting, the young Fairbank became strongly anti-slavery.

He began his career freeing slaves in 1837 when, piloting a lumber raft down the Ohio River, he ferried a slave across the river to free territory. Soon he was delivering escaped slaves to the Quaker abolitionist Levi Coffin for transportation on the Underground Railroad to northern US cities or to Canada.

== Aliases ==
Calvin Fairbank used aliases: Samuel P. King, Samuel S. King, John Doe, Richard Roe/Rowe and John Rowe.

== Methodist Episcopal Church ==
The Methodist Episcopal Church licensed Fairbank to preach in 1840 and ordained him as a minister in 1842. Hoping to improve his education, he enrolled in 1844 in the "preparatory division" of Oberlin Collegiate Institute in Ohio, now Oberlin College. It was interracial and a center of anti-slavery sentiment. At Oberlin, Fairbank met future AME bishop, John M. Brown and the pair worked together in underground railroad activities.

== Abolitionist ==
=== Gilson Berry ===
Responding to an appeal to rescue the wife and children of an escaped slave named Gilson Berry, Fairbank went to Lexington, Kentucky, where he made contact with Delia Webster, a teacher from Vermont who was working there and had become active as an abolitionist. She was to help with the rescue, but Berry's wife failed to meet Fairbank as planned.

By chance, he met Lewis Hayden and his family, who were planning an escape. He asked Hayden, "Why do you want your freedom?" Hayden responded, "Because I am a man."

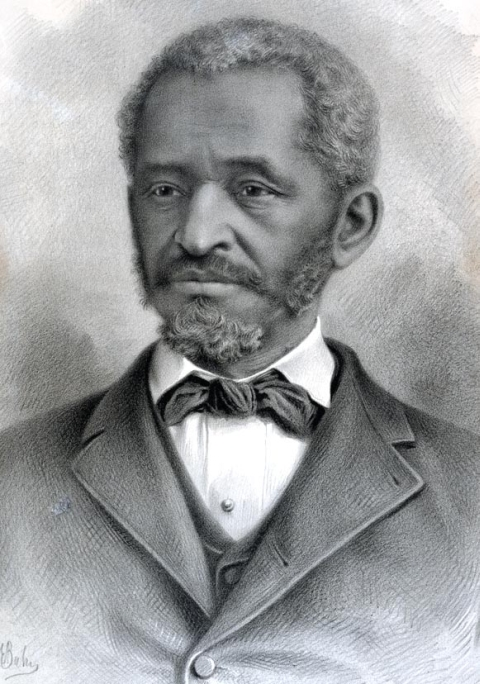
Lewis Hayden, ex-slave, abolitionist, businessman, and Republican representative from Boston to the Massachusetts state legislature in 1873; 19th-century portrait

=== The Haydens ===
Fairbank and Webster transported Hayden, his wife Harriet and Harriet's son Joseph by carriage to freedom in Ripley, Ohio. (See John Rankin (abolitionist).) The fugitive couple put flour on their faces to appear white and, in times of danger, would hide their son under the wagon seat. As Fairbank and Webster returned to Kentucky, they were identified and arrested for assisting the runaway slaves.

Webster was tried in December 1844 and sentenced to two years in the Kentucky state penitentiary, but she was pardoned by the governor after serving less than two months of her sentence. Fairbank was tried in 1845 and sentenced to a 15-year term, five years for each of the slaves he helped free.

He was pardoned in 1849 in an effort begun by his father. Effectively Lewis Hayden ransomed Fairbank, as he raised the $650 demanded by his former master to approve the pardon. Hayden had quickly collected the money within a few weeks from 160 people in Boston, where he and his family had settled.

=== Tamar ===
In 1851, Fairbank helped a slave named Tamar escape from Kentucky to Indiana. On November 9 of that year, with the connivance of the sheriff of Clark County, Indiana and Indiana Governor Joseph A. Wright, marshals from Kentucky abducted Fairbank and took him back to their state for trial. In 1852, he was sentenced to 15 years in the state penitentiary. While imprisoned, he was singled out for exceptionally harsh treatment; he was frequently flogged and overworked.

=== Imprisonment effects ===
Over his combined imprisonment of more than 17 years, Fairbank was reported to have received 35,000 lashes in prison floggings. In an April 5, 1850 article, The Liberator summarized a letter from Fairbank to William Lloyd Garrison: "He expresses gratitude to the people of Boston, indicates an intention to write a book about his experiences, and indicates that letters to him can be sent in care of Lewis Hayden."

Finally, in 1864, three years into the American Civil War, Fairbank was pardoned by Acting Governor Richard T. Jacob, who had long advocated the activist's release. When Thomas Bramlette returned to office, he had Jacob arrested and expelled from the state for his attacks on Lincoln during the presidential campaign and support for George B. McClellan.

== Marriage and family ==
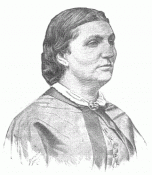
Mandana Tileston Fairbank

Once free, Fairbank married Mandana Tileston, to whom he had been engaged for thirteen years, since his brief period of freedom in 1851. Known as "Dana," she moved from Williamsburg, Massachusetts, to Oxford, Ohio, in order to visit Fairbank in prison as often as possible and to press the case for his pardon with the Governor of Kentucky. Their only child, Calvin Cornelius Fairbank, was born in 1868.

The conditions of Fairbank's life in prison broke his health. Although he held jobs with missionary and benevolent societies, he was not able to support his family. At one point, he and his wife tried to earn a living operating a bakery in the utopian community of Florence, Massachusetts. After Mandana Fairbank died of tuberculosis in 1876, Calvin gave their son to the care of her sister and brother-in-law. Fairbank remarried in 1879, but little is known of his second wife, Adeline Winegar, except that she was the daughter of Henry and Jane Winegar and like Calvin, a native of Pike. In the 1870 census she had been listed as a domestic servant. She died of cancer on February 12, 1901, in Angelica, and was buried next to Calvin in the local cemetery.

== Memoirs ==
Fairbank wrote his memoir, publishing it in 1890 under the title, Rev. Calvin Fairbank During Slavery Times: How He "Fought the Good Fight" to Prepare "the Way." This effort earned him little money. He died in near-poverty in Angelica, New York. He was buried there in the Until the Day Dawn Cemetery. He is credited with helping free 47 slaves.

== Legacy ==
In the 21st century, James Pritchard, a retired state archivist for Kentucky who published articles about the Underground Railroad, and several other persons worked to petition Kentucky Governor Steve Beshear to pardon Fairbank and others convicted of helping slaves escape. From 1844 to 1870, Kentucky imprisoned 44 persons for activities to free slaves in the state, not releasing the last man until five years after the end of the American Civil War. Eight of these persons died in prison.

On October 22, 2022, Rev. Calvin Fairbank was inducted into the National Abolitionist Hall of Fame and Museum in Peterboro, New York.

== See also ==
- Laura Smith Haviland
- Harriet Tubman
- Sojourner Truth
- List of African-American abolitionists
- Slavery in Canada
- National Underground Railroad Freedom Center

== Bibliography ==
- Coleman, J. Winston (July 1943). "Delia Webster and Calvin Fairbank, Underground Railroad Agents". Filson Club History Quarterly. 17 (3). Archived from the original on 2012-05-02.
- Rev. Calvin Fairbank during slavery times : how he "fought the good fight" to prepare "the way" Edited from his manuscript. Chicago: R.R. McCabe (1890). Reprint: New York: Negro Universities Press (1969) ISBN 0-8371-2690-8; Reprint: St. Paul, MN: Reprint Services Corp. ISBN 0-7812-8126-1
- Allen Johnson and Dumas Malone (eds), Dictionary of American Biography, Vol. 3, Part 2, New York: Charles Scribner's Sons, 1959, p. 247.
- Frances K. Eisan, Saint or Demon? The Legendary Delia Webster Opposing Slavery, New York: Pace University Press, 1996. ISBN 0-944473-41-5
- James Pritchard, Into the Fiery Furnace, Part I: Anti-Slavery Prisoners in the Kentucky State Penitentiary 1844–1870, 2006, Kentucky's Underground Railroad, KET-TV
- Randolph Paul Runyon, Delia Webster and the Underground Railroad, Lexington: University of Kentucky Press, 1998. ISBN 0-8131-1966-9
- Joel Strangis, Lewis Hayden and the War Against Slavery, North Haven, CN: Linnet Books, 1999. ISBN 0-208-02430-1
