= Murder of Lonetta White =

1998 robbery-murder of an elderly woman in Kentucky

Lonetta White
- Born: Lonetta Penman; November 20, 1924; Danville, Kentucky, U.S.
- Died: March 15, 1998 (aged 73); Lexington, Kentucky, U.S.
- Cause of death: Fatal assault
- Known for: Victim of a robbery-murder case

On March 15, 1998, 73-year-old Lonetta Penman White (November 20, 1924 – March 15, 1998) was attacked and murdered by two intruders while a robbery took place inside her house in Lexington, Kentucky. The perpetrators, Johnathan Wayne Goforth (November 21, 1960 – June 14, 2025) and Virginia Susan Caudill (born September 10, 1960), the latter who was the ex-fiancée of White's son, stuffed the body of White inside the trunk of her car and set fire to the car, after abandoning the vehicle at a rural spot in Lexington. The couple were both charged with murder and robbery, and sentenced to death on March 24, 2000. Goforth died on death row on June 14, 2025, while Caudill, who exhausted her appeals in 2019, continues to await her execution. Caudill is also the only woman on Kentucky's death row. The two remain the only white death row inmates in Kentucky to be condemned for killing a black victim in the modern era.

== Murder ==
=== Robbery and death ===
On March 15, 1998, a 73-year-old woman was attacked and murdered by two intruders who were robbing her house in Lexington, Kentucky.

On that day itself, the victim, Lonetta Penman White, was alone at her house, where she lived with her son. Two people, 37-year-old Johnathan Wayne Goforth and 37-year-old Virginia Susan Caudill, entered the house to rob White, and together, they beat her to death with a hammer. Out of the two killers, Caudill personally knew the victim, as she was the former fiancée of White's son. Caudill recently moved out of the White family's house due to an argument with White's son over her drug addiction (which also led to White's son breaking off their engagement), and she subsequently went back to the house with Goforth, her old acquaintance, and therefore robbed and killed White.

After murdering White, both Caudill and Goforth ransacked the house and stole several valuables, including the jewelry, two guns, and a mink coat. Afterwards, the pair stuffed the body of White inside the trunk of her automobile, which they drove to a rural part of Lexington, where they subsequently started a fire and burned the car.

Subsequently, White's corpse was found inside her burning car sometime after both Caudill and Goforth fled the scene. By the end of March 1998, the police were able to establish White's identity.

=== Background of victim and perpetrators ===
Born on November 20, 1924, Lonetta White (née Penman) was one of 14 children in her family and grew up in Danville, Kentucky, and was reportedly successful in her adult life as an employee of GTE Financial. Her husband, George White, was a businessman from Chicago, Illinois, and George died sometime around 1990. White relocated back from Illinois to Lexington in Kentucky in 1993 after the death of her husband and her retirement. Together, the couple had one son, Steven, who was struggling with drug addiction at one point in his life.

Virginia Susan Caudill

Born on September 10, 1960, Virginia Susan Caudill was Steven White's ex-fiancée. Caudill was born as the middle child in a family of three children. Her mother was loving towards her children, but her father was an alcoholic and often abusive. During her schooling years, Caudill was often shunned by fellow schoolmates because she was wore eyeglasses, her slowness and obesity. Caudill herself eventually turned to alcoholism and drugs, and even became a prostitute to make a living for herself. Caudill was married twice with one daughter and one adopted son; her first biological grandchild was born while Caudill was in prison for killing Lonetta White.

Johnathan Wayne Goforth

Born on November 21, 1960, Johnathan Wayne Goforth was the youngest of three children in his family, who resided at rural Jessamine County, Kentucky, where he was born and raised. Goforth, nicknamed Heavy due to his obesity, was said to have a normal childhood and grew up to be an accomplished carpenter and plumber. However, Goforth had a criminal record for robbery and drug offences prior to the murder of White.

== Arrest and investigations ==
Following the discovery of Lonetta White's body, the police conducted a murder investigation and later managed to identify Caudill as a prime suspect. They retrieved DNA evidence that linked Caudill to the killing, and also blood and hair (both human hair and hairs of a mink coat) from the vehicle. The stolen guns were also recovered from a river in Kentucky.

However, both Caudill and Goforth had fled Kentucky to other states, and as such warrants of arrests were issued for the pair, who both entered the wanted list as one of the top sought-after fugitives. On October 31, 1998, true crime documentary series America's Most Wanted covered the murder of Lonetta White and also sent out a public appeal for information pertaining to the whereabouts of both Caudill and Goforth.

On November 12, 1998, it was reported that 37-year-old Virginia Caudill was arrested while she was detained at a detention center in New Orleans, Louisiana, for unrelated charges of theft under the alias "Kelly Lyons", after a fellow female prisoner recognised Caudill as the alleged killer mentioned in the show and thus alerted the authorities. The police continued to trace the whereabouts of Goforth after the capture of Caudill, who was extradited back to Kentucky to face charges for the murder of White.

On December 8, 1998, 37-year-old Johnathan Goforth was arrested in Mississippi after police received a tip-off about his whereabouts.

== Trials of Virginia Caudill and Johnathan Goforth ==
=== Prosecution's case ===
On February 7, 2000, both Virginia Caudill and Johnathan Goforth stood trial before a Fayette County jury for the murder of Lonetta White, with jury selection happening on that day itself. During the trial itself, the medical examiner, Dr. Greg Davis, stated that based on his autopsy findings, White suffered from at least 13 blows to her head as caused by a hammer and these injuries would have caused a lot of pain and bleeding.

Dr. Michel DeGuglielmo, who oversaw the forensic DNA testing of the crime scene and exhibits, found traces of the victim's blood on the jeans of one of the defendants, and more was found inside the truck of the other. Caudill's bootlace also bore a mix of her own blood along with that of White, which further corroborated that both Goforth and Caudill were involved in the murder of White.

Cynthia Ellis, a jailhouse informant, testified that Caudill told her she went to White's house to ask for money to buy drugs. When White declined, Caudill struck her with a clock. Another informant, Julia Davis, testified that Caudill admitted to breaking into White's home with the intention of stealing money for drugs. When White discovered her, Caudill said she killed her, took her guns and jewelry, and set her car on fire. Davis also mentioned that White asked in her dying breath, "Why are you doing this to me?"

=== Defense's case ===
When the pair entered their defense, both of them admitted to the robbery but denied killing White, and pinned the blame on one another. Caudill testified that she and Goforth were high on drugs, and after taking them, they went to White's house in hope of borrowing some money to buy more drugs. According to Caudill, White agreed to give her some money, but afterward, Goforth attacked White and also tied up Caudill, forcing her to stay in another room before he went out to kill White. Afterward, Goforth ransacked and stole some valuables from the house, and ordered Caudill to bring the body into White's automobile, which they later abandoned at another area in Lexington and then burned the car.

On the other hand, Goforth claimed innocence and stated it was Caudill who murdered White. Goforth testified that Caudill went to the house with him, creating an excuse to enter White's house under the pretext of borrowing her telephone after their car broke down. After gaining entry, Goforth claimed that Caudill asked White for some money, which White refused, and in retaliation, Caudill suddenly wielded a roofer's hammer she removed from Goforth's truck and killed White, before they ransacked the house and put the stolen property into Goforth's truck. They then stuffed White's body into her car and burned it at another location.

=== Verdict ===
On February 17, 2000, the jury found both Caudill and Goforth guilty of murder, first degree robbery, first degree burglary, second degree arson, and tampering with physical evidence.

On that same day, the jury returned with their verdict on sentence, unanimously recommending the death penalty for both Caudill and Goforth on the charges of murder, in addition to 65 years in prison for each of the two accused on the lesser charges, with the trial judge officially passing sentence on a later date. Reportedly, Caudill broke down in court and she had to be led away from the courtroom, while Goforth simply smiled. Two sisters of White were also present in the courtroom to hear the jury's sentencing decision, and White's youngest sister, Mayme Penman, pointed out that both the killers should face the consequences for the murder of her older sister. Caudill was the first woman in Kentucky to be sent to death row after LaFonda Fay Foster had her death sentence commuted to life without parole for killing five people in 1987.

According to reports, the jury's unanimous recommendation for capital punishment was highly unusual since it was extremely rare for White people to be sentenced to death by the jury for the murder of an African-American person.

On March 24, 2000, Fayette County Circuit Judge John Adams aligned with the jury's recommendation and formally sentenced both 39-year-old Johnathan Goforth and 39-year-old Virginia Caudill to death for the murder of Lonetta White.

Before the duo's sentencing, White's family spoke about the impact of her tragic death, describing her as a vibrant person who never harmed anyone. Caudill's daughter asked for life imprisonment, while Goforth's sister maintained his innocence. Caudill personally addressed the judge, asking for mercy and vowing to spread the word of God as a redeemed individual. Despite these pleas, Judge Adams refused to accept the pleas for leniency and opted to sentence Caudill (and Goforth) to death.

== Appeal process ==
After they were sentenced to death, both Johnathan Goforth and Virginia Caudill appealed to the Kentucky Supreme Court against their death sentences and murder convictions. On June 12, 2003, the Kentucky Supreme Court dismissed the joint appeals of both Goforth and Caudill.

On April 24, 2009, the Kentucky Supreme Court dismissed the second appeal from both Caudill and Goforth.

On October 29, 2009, the Kentucky Supreme Court rejected Caudill's third appeal.

On May 14, 2012, U.S. Magistrate Judge Edward B. Atkins of a federal district court rejected Caudill's appeal.

On January 31, 2014, U.S. District Judge Danny C. Reeves of a federal district court rejected Caudill's appeal.

On February 2, 2018, the 6th U.S. Circuit Court of Appeals rejected Caudill's appeal.

On January 7, 2019, the U.S. Supreme Court rejected Caudill's final appeal, thus confirming her death sentence for the murder of Lonetta White.

On March 23, 2023, Caudill, Goforth and a third condemned inmate named Leif Halvorsen lost their joint appeals to vacate their convictions; Halvorsen and his accomplice Mitchell Willoughby were both sentenced to death for a 1983 triple murder in Lexington.

On March 27, 2023, U.S. District Judge Karen K. Caldwell denied Goforth's federal appeal.

== Aftermath ==
In October 2019, the case of Virginia Caudill and Johnathan Goforth was featured in a crime documentary series, titled Deadly Women.

While capital punishment is still legal in Kentucky, a moratorium has been in place since 2010 due to a court order that prohibits any future executions until a lawsuit regarding the state's lethal injection protocols is resolved. Kentucky's most recent execution occurred in 2008, when Marco Allen Chapman was put to death for a double murder. As of 2025, both Caudill and Goforth have not been assigned execution dates, as long as the court order remains in effect. A 2024 report showed that a total of 25 inmates, including Caudill and Goforth, still remain on state death row in Kentucky.

The verdict of death marked a rare occasion, as well as the first in Kentucky, where one or more White defendants were sentenced to death for the murder of an African-American person, with Lonetta White being African-American while both Caudill and Goforth were White themselves. Furthermore, Caudill was one of only two White women (the other was Kimberly Cargill) in the United States to be sentenced to death for killing victims of African-American descent as of 2014. If executed, both Caudill and Goforth will become the first two White people (with Caudill being the first White woman) executed for killing an African-American victim in modern-era Kentucky.

Furthermore, Caudill was the only woman on death row in Kentucky over the past two decades or more. If her death sentence is carried out, Caudill will become the first female offender to be executed by the Commonwealth of Kentucky since 1868, when a 13-year-old girl named Susan Eliza was publicly hanged for murder.

As of 2025, Caudill remains incarcerated on death row at the Kentucky Correctional Institution for Women, while Goforth was incarcerated at the Kentucky State Penitentiary (the state's designated facility for male death row prisoners). On June 14, 2025, Goforth died while receiving care for an illness at a private hospital in Louisville, Kentucky.

== See also ==
- Capital punishment in Kentucky
- List of death row inmates in the United States § Kentucky
- List of women on death row in the United States § Kentucky
- Race and capital punishment in the United States
