= Delia Webster =

American abolitionist and teacher (1817–1904)

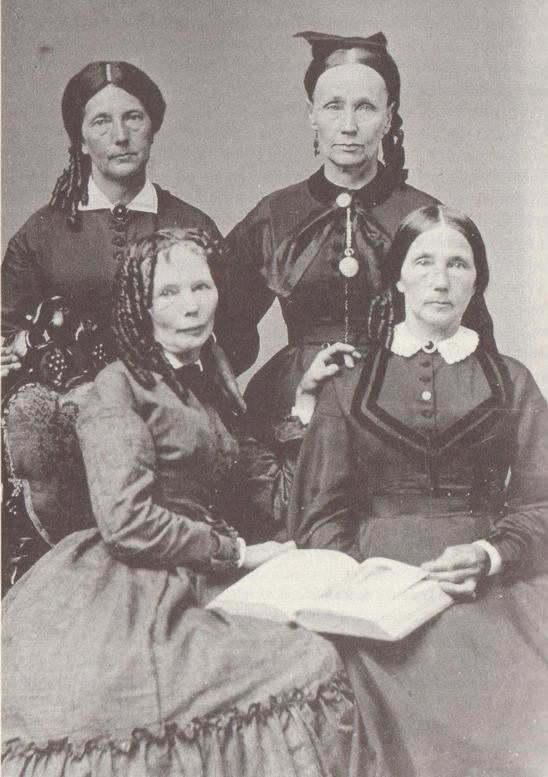
Delia Webster, abolitionist. Delia (front left) with her sisters: Mary Jane (front right), Martha (back left), and Betsey (back right).

Delia Ann Webster (December 17, 1817 – January 18, 1904) was an American teacher, author, businesswoman and abolitionist in Kentucky who, with Calvin Fairbank, aided many slaves, including Lewis Hayden, his wife Harriet, and their son Joseph to escape to Ohio (and then to Canada). She was convicted and sentenced to two years in the Kentucky State Penitentiary in Frankfort for aiding the Haydens' escape, but pardoned after two months.

In 1854, Webster bought a farm along the Ohio River in Trimble County, Kentucky with the financial help of Boston abolitionists, and operated it as a station on the Underground Railroad. She was arrested a second time for her efforts to aid fugitive slaves, but the trial was discharged. Soon after, her home and farm were vandalized and subject to arson. Unable to pay for its expenses and her loan, she lost it to creditors. She then moved to Indiana.

In 1996, she was honored as one of the Kentucky Women Remembered. A watercolor hangs in her honor in the Kentucky Capitol Building in their exhibit.

== Early life ==
Delia Webster was born December 17, 1817, to Benajah Webster (Note: Delia's father's name is spelled as Benejah and Benajah. The History and genealogy of the Gov. John Webster of Connecticut spells his name as Benajah.) and his wife, Esther, in Vergennes, Vermont; she was one of ten children. Webster attended the Vergennes Classical School. She began teaching school at 12 years of age. Webster was raised near the farm Rokeby, which was used to shelter travelers on the Underground Railroad. The farm has been designated a National Historic Landmark.

In the spring of 1835, she obtained a teaching position. Webster went to Ohio to take classes at Oberlin College, the first integrated college in the United States. The town of Oberlin was a "hotbed of abolitionism" and supporters ran stations on the Underground Railroad, assisting escaped slaves to freedom.

== Lexington, Kentucky ==
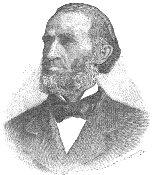
Reverend Calvin Fairbank, abolitionist

Webster traveled to Lexington, Kentucky in 1843. She decided to stay there to teach art and was a co-founder of the Lexington Female Academy.

Webster's abolitionist efforts in Lexington were described in a 1921 article in Indiana Magazine of History:

She came to be hated by the slave masters as well as feared by them. While nothing could be established against her, she was constantly under suspicion and was subjected to threats intermingled with much persecution. With all this opposition, she continued her work just the same, traveling from one locality to another, always coming in contact with slaves and teaching them the avenues of escape and very frequently aiding them directly in the work herself.

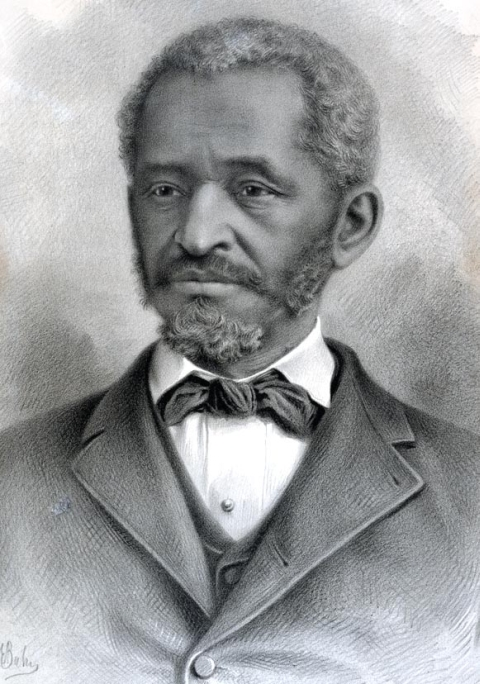
Lewis Hayden, 19th-century portrait, ex-slave, abolitionist, businessman, Republican Party representative from Boston to the Massachusetts state legislature in 1873.

She often worked with Methodist minister, Calvin Fairbank. It was said that "Northern Kentucky suffered greatly for her effective work."

In 1844, Webster and Rev. Calvin Fairbank assisted three slaves, the Haydens, in their escape to Ohio, where they transported them by wagon. Their role was discovered, and she and Fairbank were arrested. They were tried separately. She was tried and sentenced in 1845, to "2 years hard labor in the Kentucky Penitentiary for aiding and abducting slaves." On February 24, 1845, Webster was pardoned by Governor William Owsley, at the urging of the penitentiary warden, Newton B. Craig. To earn her freedom, she declared that she was not an abolitionist.

According to a 1911 account:

Miss Delia Webster is the lady who was sentenced to the State penitentiary for abducting our silly old servants into Ohio. But the jury of Kentucky noblemen who returned the verdict -- being married men, and long used to forgiving a woman anything -- petitioned the governor to pardon Miss Delia on the ground that she belongs to the sect that can do no wrong -- and be punished for it. Whereupon the governor, seasoned to the like large experience, pardoned the lady.

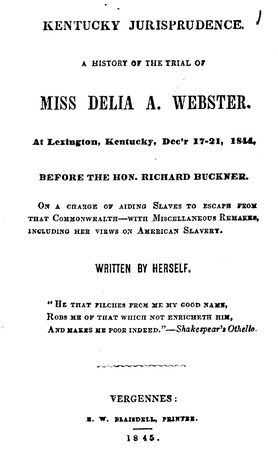
Delia Ann Webster (1845). A History of the Trial of Miss Delia A. Webster

Webster went to live with her parents after her release in February 1845. She wrote about the events in Kentucky Jurisprudence: A History of the Trial of Miss Delia A. Webster (1845).

== Vermont, New York, and Indiana ==
She taught school during the three years that she lived with her parents in Vermont, but found the harsh winters harmful to her health. She then went to New York, where she taught school, was involved in the Woman's suffrage movement, and sought the salt-water air to heal her bronchitis. Due to her health and at the urgings for her to return, she returned to the south, moving to Madison, Indiana in 1849. Kentucky was just across the Ohio River from her new city. She was a governess to Newton Craig's family for years, traveled with them, and took Craig's son Dillard on a visit to Vermont, where she tutored him.

After she left the employment of the Craigs, Webster went east and socialized with fellow abolitionists. Webster returned to Madison, purchased a house, and lived there for a year before moving to Trimble County. She began working on the Underground Railroad in 1853.

== Trimble County, Kentucky ==
In 1854, Webster bought a 600-acre farm along the Ohio River in Trimble County, Kentucky. The purchase was partly funded from northern abolitionists. Her farm, which she called Mt. Orison, became an Underground Railroad station. She hired freed blacks as farm workers. Accusing her of aiding their slaves' escapes, Kentucky slaveowners threatened Webster that she, her crops or her farm might come to harm if she remained in the area. There were raids on her farm and threats against her life. Upset about her activities, Craig sought to have her arrested. He was reported to have been annoyed and desired to exact revenge "for being tricked".

In 1854, a warrant was issued for her arrest in connection with missing slaves in the area. She was arrested and jailed, but was able to escape. Webster traveled to Madison, Indiana where she was hidden in many city and country locations. She was captured and jailed in Indiana, pending a trial under the 1850 Fugitive Slave Act. It was conducted in Madison in late July. Newton Craig was a witness for the prosecution. Judge Walker discharged Webster on May 21, 1854. Craig was shot from behind by a man named Mr. Randall, who was believed to be a laborer on Webster's farm. Craig's wounds were not fatal and he did not pursue prosecution of the gunman. Webster's farm had been looted of about $9,000 in household, farm and personal belongings. When she was unable to make her loan payments, a "Webster Farm Association" was founded by people in the anti-slavery movement from Boston, Massachusetts. With their assistance, she was able to keep the farm. (Note: Asher said that there was an $8,000 loss; It was reported to be a $9,000 loss in the Indiana Magazine of History.)

She continued to operate as part of the Underground Railroad and served as a nurse to wounded soldiers along with Harriet Beecher Stowe during the Civil War.

Webster had obtained building materials to build a school on her property. But, in November 1866 her home and the building materials were destroyed in a fire by arsonists. "Over time arsonists destroyed seventeen buildings, four barns, and finally Webster's residence." Without sufficient financial resources, in October 1869 she lost possession of her property.

== Indiana and Iowa ==
Webster moved to Madison, Indiana and returned to teaching. After the war, African American children were not allowed to attend public schools, so she taught children in a school that was established in an African American Baptist Church on 5th Street. She wrote and lectured for a time.

Webster died on January 18, 1904, in Iowa, where she lived with her niece, Dr. Alice Goodrich. (Note: Other records incorrectly state that she died in Jeffersonville in 1876.)

== Legacy and honors ==
A Kentucky Highway Marker was established to honor Webster, the "Petticoat Abolitionist," in Trimble County at the junction of US 421 and KY 1255.

'Underground railroad' station, a mile west, run by Delia Webster on land bought with funds provided by Northern abolitionists, 1854. Slaveholders filed charges against her. After refusing to leave Ky., she was imprisoned. Following her release she was indicted again by escaped into Indiana. For similar activities in Lexington she had served term in penitentiary, 1844.

There is also a highway marker at the Trimble county jail at Courthouse Square in Bedford, Kentucky that states she was its most notable resident.

In 1996, she was honored as one of the Kentucky Women Remembered. Her portrait hangs in the West Wing of the Kentucky State Capitol, along with other noted women of Kentucky.
