= Harry Edward Greenwell =

American serial killer (1944–2013)

- An undated mugshot of Greenwell
- Born: Harry Edward Greenwell; December 9, 1944; Louisville, Kentucky, U.S.
- Died: January 31, 2013 (aged 68); Lansing, Iowa, U.S.
- Other names: "I-65 Killer" "Days Inn Killer"

Details
- Victims: 3+
- Span of crimes: 1987–1991
- Country: United States
- States: Kentucky, Indiana
- Date apprehended: N/A (died before being identified as a serial killer)

Harry Edward Greenwell (December 9, 1944 – January 31, 2013), known as The I-65 Killer and The Days Inn Killer, was an American serial killer and rapist who committed at least three murders along Interstate 65 in Indiana and Kentucky between 1987 and 1989. The killings were linked to Greenwell via DNA in 2022, but he had died of cancer in 2013.

== Early life ==
Harry Edward Greenwell was born in Louisville, Kentucky to Paul and Dorothy Greenwell. On January 17, 1963, Greenwell was arrested for an armed robbery in Louisville, and was sentenced on April 12, 1963, to two years in the reformatory along with five years of probation. On February 23, 1965, Greenwell was arrested in Jefferson County, Kentucky on a sodomy charge. In 1969, he was paroled from the Kentucky State Penitentiary.

On April 28, 1978, Greenwell's wife died in a house fire in Vernon County, Wisconsin. Shortly thereafter, Greenwell met a 39-year-old single mother who had previously been in an abusive relationship. After some time, the couple married, with Greenwell—who had adopted a daughter from a previous marriage—fathering a son of his own. In 1982, Greenwell was once again arrested and sentenced to prison for a burglary in Iowa. During his arrest, Greenwell escaped from custody and was recaptured twice. He served in the Anamosa State Penitentiary and Kentucky State Reformatory until his release in 1983. At some point, Greenwell found employment as a railroad worker, and worked on tracks across the Midwest.

== Murders ==
On February 21, 1987, Greenwell sexually assaulted and shot 41-year-old Vicki Lucille Heath, at the Super 8 Motel in Elizabethtown, Kentucky. The motel lobby showed signs of a fight, with a telephone being uprooted from the wall. Her body was later found by the police behind a trash dumpster in the parking lot of the motel.

On March 3, 1989, Greenwell killed two hotel clerks along the I-65 corridor. 24-year-old Margaret Mary "Peggy" Gill, a night auditor at the Days Inn in Merrillville, Indiana, was sexually assaulted and shot twice in the head, and her body was dumped in a back hallway. $179 was taken from the motel. Four hours later, Greenwell sexually assaulted and shot 34-year-old Jeanne Gilbert, a part-time auditor at the Days Inn in Remington, Indiana. Her body was found near the roadway, in the early morning by a passing motorist. $247 was taken from the motel. Greenwell shot both women with the same .22 caliber handgun.

On January 2, 1990, Greenwell attacked a 21-year-old hotel clerk at the Days Inn in Columbus, Indiana. The victim, who survived the attack, was working the night shift when Greenwell sexually assaulted, stabbed, and robbed her. She was able to describe her attacker and a composite drawing of the suspected was produced. DNA evidence linked the attack to the 1989 murders.

In 1991, Greenwell sexually assaulted and stabbed another woman in Rochester, Minnesota. She survived and gave a similar description of the assailant, noting his flannel shirt and jeans, as well as bearing a lazy eye. This case was officially linked to the others via DNA analysis in 2013. It is the only known attack that occurred along Interstate 90.

=== Investigation ===
The murders were considered a cold case until 2008, when DNA from evidence was submitted. In 2010, the Kentucky State Police announced that DNA evidence linked the three murders and they were officially dealing with a serial killer. DNA also linked him to at least four cases in several states where female motel clerks working along I-65 were sexually assaulted and robbed. The attacks, occurring between January and March, led police to believe that the killer was a seasonal worker. Elizabethtown police suspected the killer to be a truck driver or traveling salesman between the age of 55 and 65.

Greenwell was identified as the killer through a DNA match with his close family member. Testing done by the Indiana State Police testing lab returned a match of 99.999% probability. The Indiana State Police announced the identification on April 5, 2022, and stated that they are investigating the "distinct possibility" of Greenwell being involved in other violent crimes in the Midwest.

== Personal life ==
While Greenwell was not identified as the perpetrator of the assaults and murders until 2022, he was arrested in 1989 for a traffic violation and a domestic incident in La Crosse, Wisconsin. A month later, he was arrested for violating a restraining order and was sentenced to fifteen months' probation on April 18, 1989. In October 1998, Greenwell was arrested for felony possession in Allamakee County, Iowa.

Greenwell retired from his position in the Canadian Pacific Railway in February 2010. During this time, he lived in a small town where he was reportedly said to have been a kind and charismatic man, noted for his generosity. He also indulged in a variety of hobbies, ranging from organic gardening, frequenting the farmers' market where he sold his produce, traveling, reading, wordsmithing, and held great interest in college sports and horse racing. In 2013, Greenwell died from cancer in Lansing, Iowa.

== See also ==
- List of serial killers in the United States
