= Roederer Correctional Complex =

Prison in Kentucky, United States

Coordinates: 38°23′56″N 85°26′37″W

- Interactive map of Roederer Correctional Complex
- Location: 4000 Morgan Rd PO Box 69 La Grange, Kentucky
- Status: open
- Security class: mixed
- Capacity: 997
- Opened: 1978
- Managed by: Kentucky Department of Corrections

Roederer Correctional Complex is a minimum and medium-security state prison located in unincorporated Oldham County, unincorporated Oldham County, near La Grange and near the Buckner census-designated place. It is about 30 miles (48 km) northeast of Louisville. The Kentucky Department of Corrections Assessment and Classification Center is located at Roederer. All new male inmates, with the exception of those sentenced to death, are initially assigned to Roederer until they can be classified and transferred to other prison within the Commonwealth. The prison opened in 1978 and had a prison population of 997 as of 2007.
