= Green River Correctional Complex =

State prison located in Central City, Kentucky

Coordinates: 37°18′51″N 87°06′48″W

- Interactive map of Green River Correctional Complex
- Location: 1200 River Road Central City, Kentucky
- Status: open
- Security class: minimum/medium
- Capacity: 982
- Opened: 1994
- Managed by: Kentucky Department of Corrections
- Director: Tim Lane

Green River Correctional Complex (GRCC) is a state prison located in Central City, Kentucky. It opened in 1994 and had a prison population of 982 as of 2007.

It is a minimum to medium security adult male correctional facility and it is operated by the Kentucky Justice and Public Safety Cabinet, Department of Corrections with accreditation by the American Correctional Association. The prison is on 250 acres (1.0 km^{2}) they have a staff of 254, the annual cost to house the inmates is $19,518.99 with a daily cost of $53.48 per inmate and an annual operating budget of $23.9 Million. Of the inmates, 66% are identified as white and 33% are identified as black with the remaining 1% being made of other races.

== Facility ==
The complex has three medium security general population housing units that have 444 double bunk cells, one maximum security segregation unit that has 44 single bunked cells and a fifty-bed open dorm style minimum security unit.

== Staff ==
Timothy Lane is the current Warden. The facility has two Deputy Wardens, Byron Masden and Angela Hernandez.

== Programs ==
The Green River Correctional Complex has several programs that the inmates are able to participate in; they are also given educational opportunities.

- Alcohol and Narcotics Anonymous: A program for both men and women who suffer from alcohol and drug abuse.
- Anger Management: This is a twelve-week class that is based on the book "Houses of Healing: A Prisoner's Guide to Inner Power and Freedom."
- Substance Abuse Program/Therapeutic Community: A roughly six-month program dedicated to achieving and maintaining sobriety and a drug-free lifestyle.
