= Ohio River flood of 1937 =

1937 flood

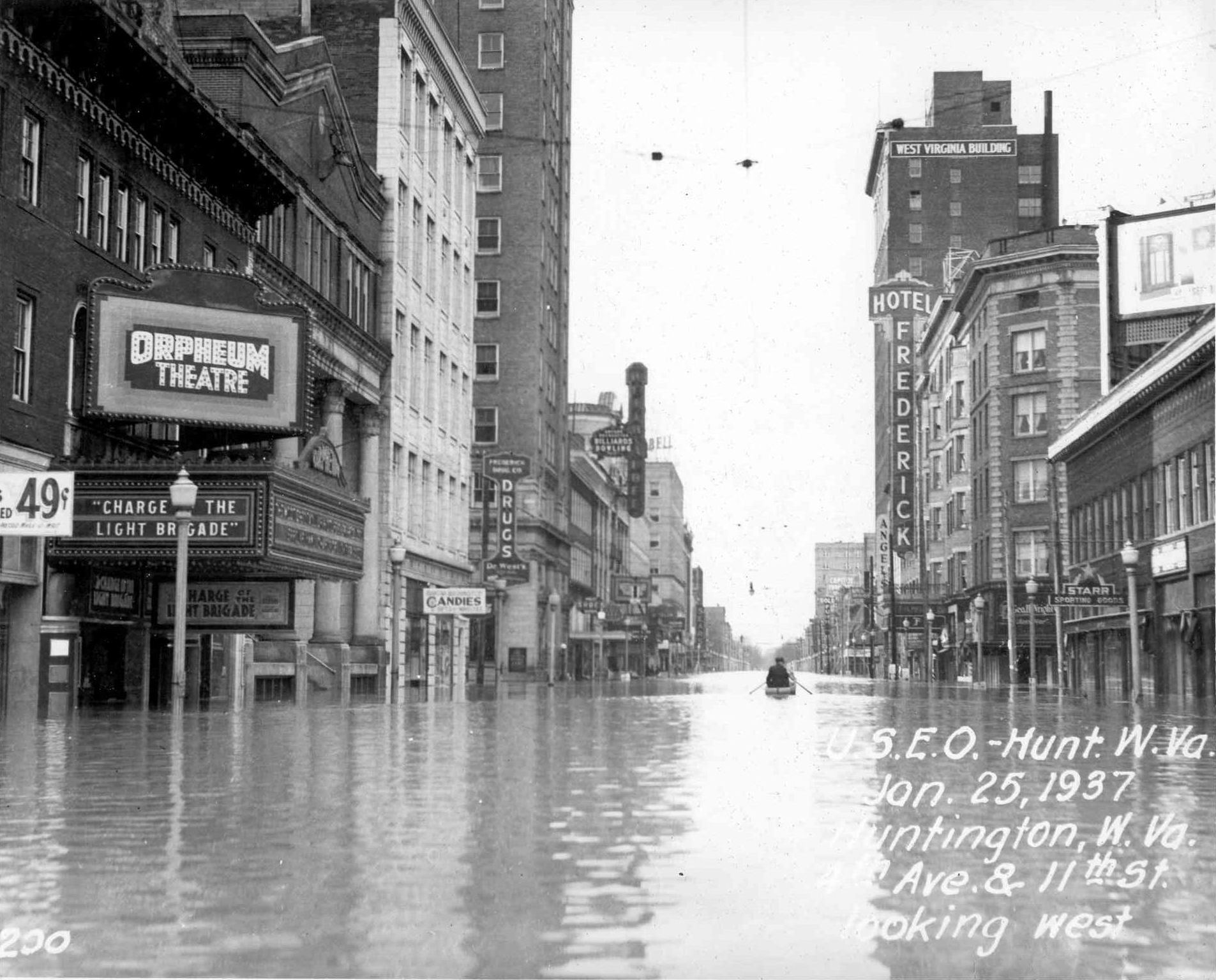
Downtown Huntington, West Virginia, during the Great Flood of 1937

The Ohio River flood of 1937 took place in late January and February 1937. With damage stretching from Pittsburgh, Pennsylvania, to Cairo, Illinois, 385 people died, one million people were left homeless and property losses reached $500 million ($11.1 billion when adjusted for inflation as of April 2025). Federal and state resources were strained to aid recovery because the disaster occurred during the depths of the Great Depression and a few years after the beginning of the Dust Bowl.

== Event timeline ==
- January 5: Water levels began to rise.
- January 10–18: Numerous flood warnings were issued across much of the region.
- January 13–24: Near record rainfalls were recorded.
- January 18: Numerous homes were flooded as the Ohio River started to overflow its banks due to the heavy rains.
- January 23–24: Martial law was declared in Evansville, Indiana, where the water level was at 54 feet (16 m).
- January 26: River gauge levels reached 80 feet (24 m) in Cincinnati, the highest level in the city's history.
- January 27: River gauge reached 57 feet (17 m) in the Louisville area, setting a new record. Seventy percent of the city was under water at that time.
- February 2: River gauge surpassed 60 feet (18 m) in Paducah, Kentucky.
- February 5: Water levels fell below the flood stage for the first time in nearly three weeks in several regions.

== Aftermath and reconstruction ==
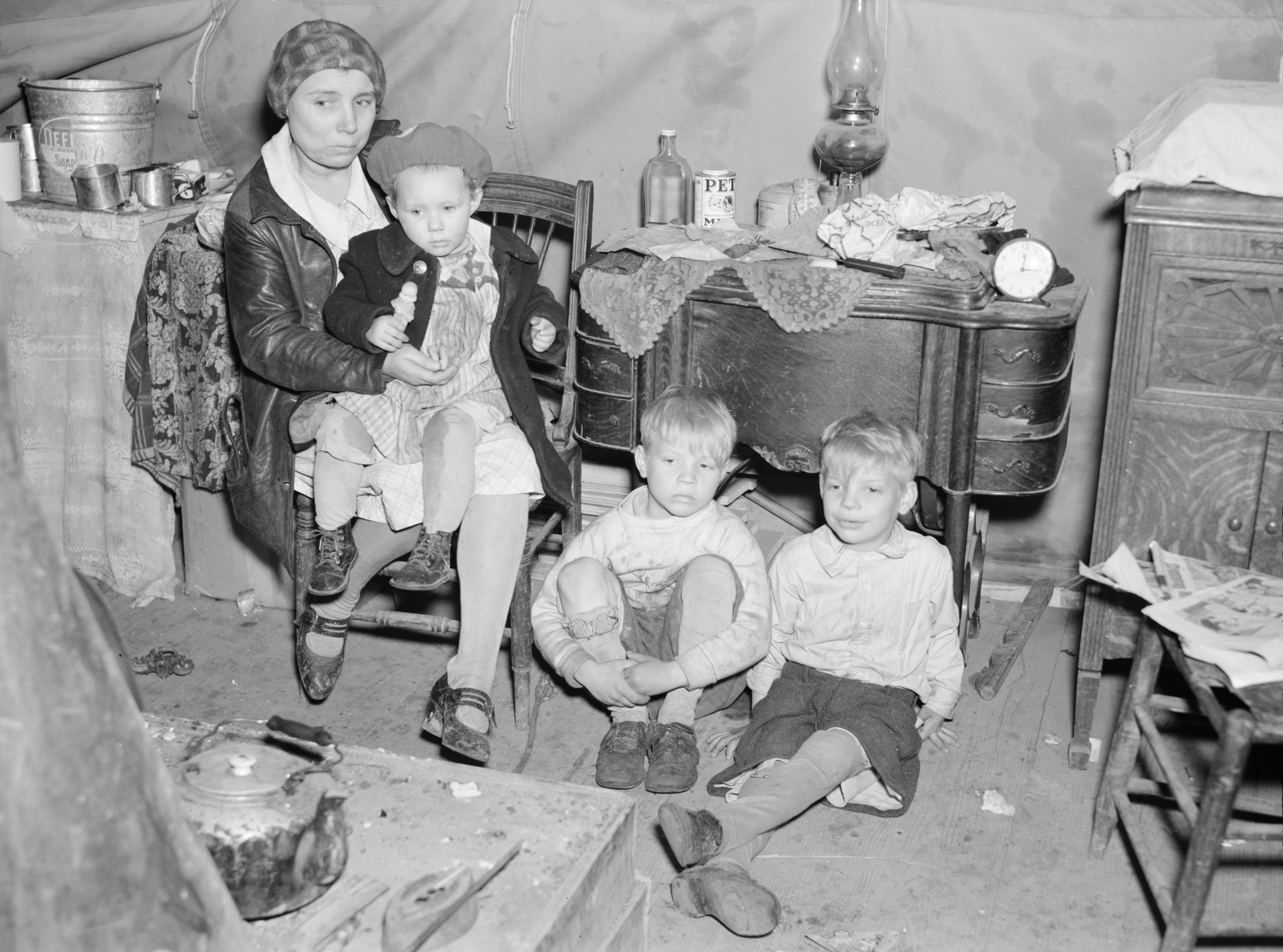
Members of a refugee family left homeless by the flood in Shawneetown, Illinois

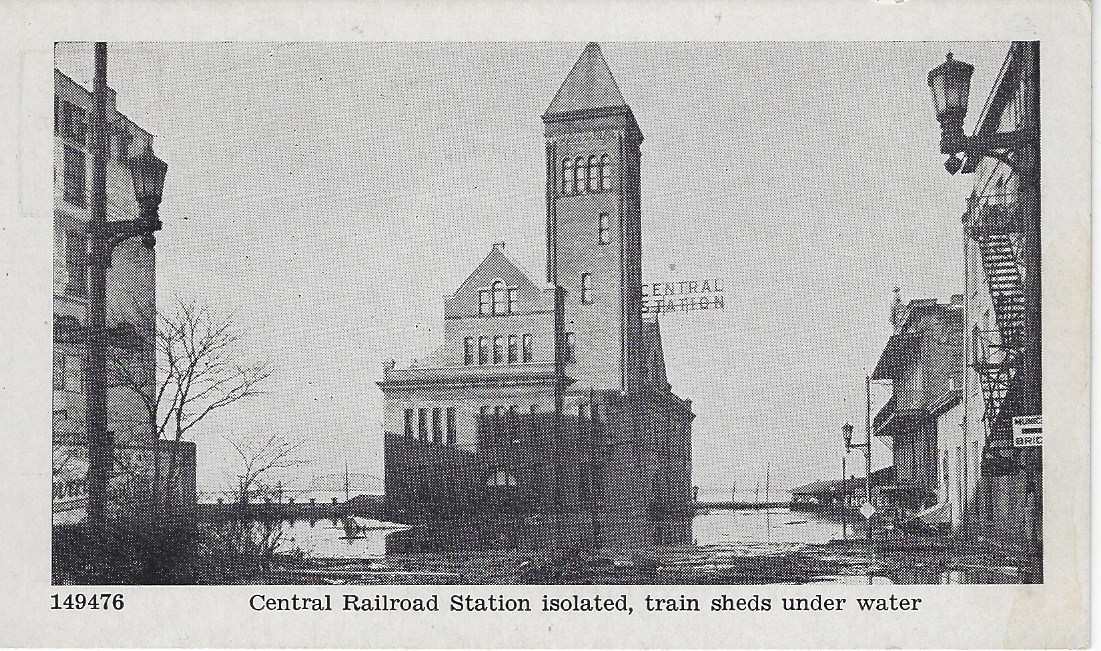
Louisville's Central Station, flooded

=== Media response ===
A handful of powerhouse radio stations, including WLW Cincinnati and WHAS Louisville, quickly switched to non-stop news coverage, transmitting commercial-free for weeks. These broadcasts consisted mostly of messages being relayed to rescue crews, as many civil agencies had no other means of communication. The Regionalist painter Thomas Hart Benton was commissioned by The Kansas City Star and St. Louis Post-Dispatch newspapers to provide sketches depicting the miserable conditions of the flooded areas in the Missouri Bootheel region.

When it became obvious that the river would cut the electric power to radio station WHAS – thus cutting the last radio voice in Louisville – the rival clear channel station in Nashville, WSM, picked up WHAS's broadcast via telephone and broadcast emergency flood reports for three days for the lower Ohio River. Other stations across the country did much the same.

Around January 18, Huntington, West Virginia radio station WSAZ (1190 AM) began hourly broadcasts of flood related news. On January 22, the station received permission from the Federal Communications Committee to broadcast around the clock. The studios and offices in the downtown Keith-Albee Theatre Building became a regional communications center. They established direct telephone communication with the city's relief headquarters in City Hall with Red Cross, the Naval Reserve, the American Legion, the police and fire departments, and the Coast Guard. Messages of inquiry concerning the safety of friends and relatives, warnings of rising gasoline-covered waters, appeals for help from marooned victims, as well as orders to relief agencies and workers poured into the cramped studios and were quickly broadcast. Staff and local volunteers stayed on the air and provided information and support for nine days until January 31, when the station's regular schedule was resumed.

=== Government response ===
In January 1937, the U.S. Army Corps of Engineers, District Engineer, MAJ Bernard Smith dispatched an entire fleet down the Cumberland River for rescue and relief work in response to the severe flooding. The bridges were too low to allow the vessels to pass under, so the vessels were forced to steam across farmland and bridge approaches, dodging telephone and power lines.

The federal government under President Franklin D. Roosevelt sent thousands of WPA workers to the affected cities to aid in rescue and recovery. It also sent supplies for food and temporary housing, and millions of dollars in aid after the floodwaters receded.

The scale of the 1937 flood was so unprecedented that civic and industrial groups lobbied national authorities to create a comprehensive plan for flood control. The plan involved creating more than seventy storage reservoirs to reduce Ohio River flood heights. Not fully completed by the Army Corps of Engineers until the early 1940s, the new facilities have drastically reduced flood damages since.

In the 1930s, the Tennessee Valley Authority sought to create a continuous minimum 9-foot (2.7 m) channel along the entirety of the Tennessee River from Paducah to Knoxville. The Authority also sought to help control flooding on the lower Mississippi River, especially in the aftermath of the Ohio River flood of 1937, as research had shown that 4% of the water in the lower Mississippi River originates in the Tennessee River watershed. TVA surveyed the lower part of the river and considered the Aurora Landing site, but eventually settled on the present site at river mile 22.4. The Kentucky Dam project was authorized on May 23, 1938, and construction began July 1, 1938.

The work of the Tennessee Valley Authority in the Tennessee River basin was strongly supported by the majority of the citizens in western Kentucky and their representatives in the United States Congress. U.S. Sen. Alben W. Barkley of Paducah and U.S. Rep. William Gregory from Mayfield and his brother U.S. Rep. Noble Gregory from Mayfield who succeeded him in office supported the funding of TVA and its role in addressing flood control, soil conservation, family relocation, recreation, production of electricity, and economic development.

== States seriously affected ==
=== Ohio ===
Crosley Field flooded in January 1937

Six to 12 inches (300 mm) of rain fell in Ohio during January 13–25, 1937, totals never equaled over such a large area of Ohio. January 1937 remains as the wettest month ever recorded in Cincinnati.

One hundred thousand people in Cincinnati were left homeless, as the flood affected the city from January 18 to February 5. The river reached its peak on January 26, at 79.9 feet (24.4 m), more than 25 feet (7.6 m) higher than flood stage. Ohio River levels on January 26–27 were the highest known from Gallipolis downstream past Cincinnati. Crests were 20 to 28 feet (8.5 m) above flood stage and 4 to 9 feet (2.7 m) above the previous record of 1884. 12 square miles (31 km^{2}) of the city's area was flooded, the water supply was cut, and streetcar service was curtailed. Among the flooded structures was Crosley Field, home field of the Cincinnati Reds baseball team. Additionally, the amusement park Coney Island was submerged, causing pieces of carousel horses to float away, which were recovered as far downriver as Paducah.

According to local historians, the town of Gallipolis was completely submerged as high as the Mound Hill Cemetery overlook, and many rumors regarding the curse of Lafayette's Gold Treasure buried by slaves on Gallipolis Island began to surface around the town.

In Portsmouth, the rising river threatened to top the flood wall, erected 10 feet (3.0 m) above flood stage. City officials deliberately opened the flood gates and allowed river water to flood the business district 8 to 10 feet (3.0 m) deep, thus preventing a catastrophic breaching of the flood wall. The Ohio River eventually crested 14 feet (4.3 m) above the top of the flood wall. Ten people died, many fewer than the 467 killed in the floods of March 1913.

=== Indiana ===
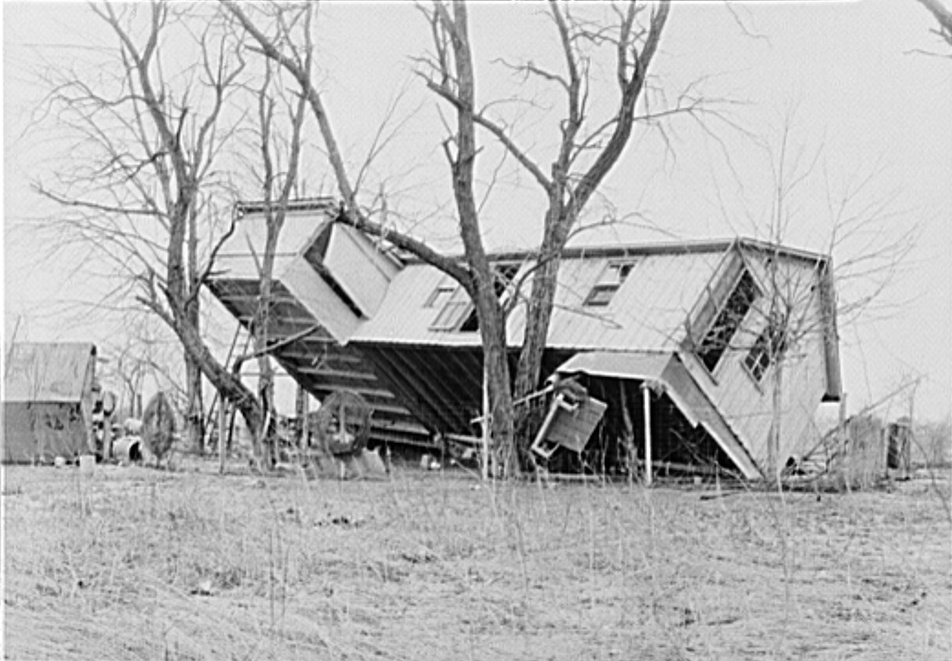
An upturned farmhouse in Posey County, Indiana

The river rose to a record 53.74 feet (16.38 m), which was 19 feet (5.8 m) above flood stage, and sent water over the six-month-old riverfront plaza in Evansville. After January 19, the conditions in New Albany, Indiana, were deteriorating at a rapid pace. By January 21, all roads leading to Jeffersonville were completely covered in water making it near impossible to travel. On January 23, a levee located on the intersection of two main streets failed. This caused for water to start rushing into the city; by midday, the water had risen to a total of 9 feet. The city and state declared martial law on January 24 and the federal government sent 4,000 WPA workers to the city to assist rescue operations. Residents were rapidly evacuated from river town by train and bus in the early stages of the flood, making Indiana the only state to avoid drowning fatalities. According to some residents of the area, the sound of the rushing water was equivalent to that of the Niagara Falls. More than 100,000 persons were left homeless by the disaster.

The WPA workers led the cleanup of the city. The Evansville Merchants Retail Bureau took out newspaper ads to praise their work:

Before and during the flood these men of WPA were active in salvaging property and saving lives, and immediately afterward they handled the cleanup job with such efficiency that many visitors were amazed that there was practically no evidence of the flood left throughout our entire city. All honor and gratitude is due to the rank and file of the WPA for their often almost super-human efforts, always giving their best in the interest of humanity.

The Red Cross and federal government spent the equivalent of $11 million in today's money in aid to the city. The Indiana State Flood Commission was created in response, and it established the Evansville-Vanderburgh Levee Authority District, which built a system of earth levees, concrete walls, and pumping stations to protect the city.

Jeffersonville welcomed the 1,000 WPA workers who came to rescue that city's residents. The federal government spent $500,000 in aid there, and $70,000 in New Albany. The Pennsylvania Railroad evacuated many area residents by train from its depot in Jeffersonville. Several small riverside towns, such as Mauckport and New Amsterdam, were so devastated that they never recovered.

=== Illinois ===
Harrisburg suffered flooding from the Ohio River in 1883–1884 and again in 1913. Much of the city, except "Crusoes' Island", a downtown orbit that encircled the town square, was underwater. High water had reached 30 miles (48 km) from the river, and the city was flooded in its position among tributary lowlands of the Saline River. Floodwaters reached nearly 30 miles (50 km) inland and Harrisburg was nearly destroyed. 4,000 within Harrisburg were left homeless and 80% of the city was inundated. Many flooded mines were deemed condemned which left the local economy crippled. In 1938, the state of Illinois had completed one of the largest operations of its kind ever attempted in the United States, the removal of more than two and a half billion gallons of flood water from Sahara mine No. 3 near downtown Harrisburg. By the time the flood waters had receded, 4000 were left homeless. Between Gallatin County and Harrisburg, about 25 miles (40 km) of Illinois Route 13 was covered by 8.0 to 14.0 feet (2.4 to 4.3 m) of water; motorboats navigated the entire distance to rescue marooned families. National guard boats were the means of transportation in the city, and several thousand people were transported daily from temporary island to island. According to the Sanborn Map Company, Harrisburg in October 1925 had a population of 15,000, and in a revised version by January 1937 the population had fallen to 13,000. Afterwards, the Army Corps of Engineers erected a levee north and east of the city to protect it from future floods. The levee has become the official northern and eastern border of the town.

Rural Pulaski County was functionally left an island by the rising portions of the Cache River, which near its mouth flowed in reverse as the Ohio floodwaters forced their way along the Cache to the Mississippi River above Cairo. The majority of county residents were driven from their homes, while the riverside county seat, Mound City, was entirely flooded, with the shallowest locations still lying under 12 feet (3.7 m) of water. Cairo itself was saved only by low water levels on the Mississippi River, which rose only to the highest spots on the levees without surmounting them. The historic city of Shawneetown was completely inundated and the residents were forced to move to a tent city on the outskirts. Property damages in the southern Illinois region amounted to more than $75 million ($1.2 billion in 2015). Over three hundred bridges were smashed, six schools were ruined, and twelve hundred submerged homes. Flood waters were recorded at 65.4 feet (19.9 m). Damage in Shawneetown was so cataclysmic the town relocated three miles inland to higher ground.

=== Kentucky ===
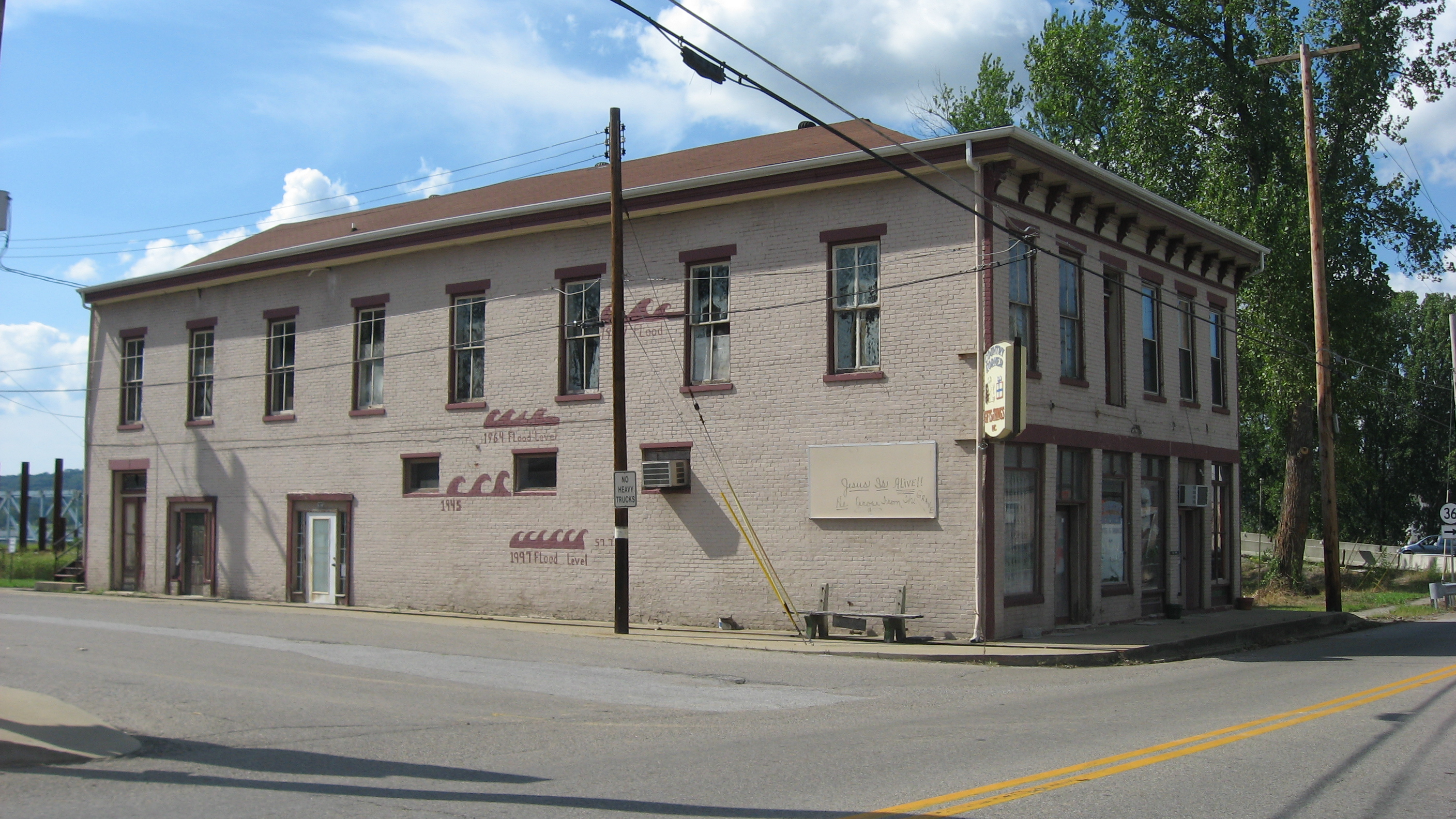
A building in Milton, Kentucky, with high water mark of 1937 on the second story

In Louisville, the water reached a height of 40 feet, which resulted in almost 70 percent of the entire city being underwater. 175,000 people were forced to leave their homes and relocate due to the flood. The reported damage of the flood in the state resulted in about $250 million worth of damage. This flood outdoes the second highest water level in the city of Louisville by an astonishing 10 feet, showing how large the flood really was. Several businesses in the Louisville area were devastated, especially the famed Rose Island amusement park (on the Indiana side of the river near Charlestown), which never rebuilt. As a result of the flood, newer development in Louisville was directed to the east out of the flood plain. The east end has since benefited by a long-term concentration of wealth among residents and businesses which located away from the older central and western areas of the city.

At Paducah, in January 1937, there was a two-week period of rain followed by a sleet storm. Initially, there were only a few individuals that were skeptical of the risen water level. At the time, most residents were accustomed to it and thought absolutely nothing of it. By January 19, it became clear that the water was reaching a very high level. The Ohio River rose above its 50-foot (15 m) flood stage on January 21, cresting at 60.8 feet (18.5 m) on February 2 and receding again to 50 feet (15 m) on February 15. For nearly three weeks, 27,000 residents were forced to flee to stay with friends and relatives in higher ground in McCracken County or in other counties. Some shelters were provided by the American Red Cross and local churches. Buildings in downtown Paducah bear historic plaques that note the high-water marks, and at least one historic marker indicates the farthest inland extent of flood waters in the city.

With 18 inches (460 mm) of rainfall in 16 days, along with sheets of swiftly moving ice, the '37 flood was the worst natural disaster in Paducah's history. Because Paducah's earthen levee was ineffective against this flood, the United States Army Corps of Engineers was commissioned to build the flood wall that now protects the city.

Flooding in Frankfort submerged half the city and caused an emergency when panicked prisoners in the old Kentucky State Penitentiary started rioting with the rising waters. With the assistance of the National Guard and state police, some prisoners were transferred to other Kentucky facilities, and the remainder of the original 2,800 prisoners were transferred to in a hastily constructed outdoor barbed wire stockade on high ground. They were eventually moved to a temporary prison camp in La Grange where a new Kentucky State Reformatory was then built.

In Frankfort where the uncontrollable waters of the Kentucky River had attained an all-time crest of 48.45 feet, nearly one-half of the city was submerged. This included the one hundred and forty year old State Penitentiary from which about 3,000 convicts, guards and officials were evacuated under military supervision directed personally by Governor A. B. Chandler.

=== West Virginia ===
Huntington, West Virginia, a city in the tri-state area that was built as a link between steamboat and railway commerce, experienced some of the worst flooding, with a crest of 69.45 ft (19 feet above flood stage). First responders, volunteers, and the Army Corps of Engineers navigated the city via rowboats and helped citizens to reach the relief shelters set up in undamaged churches and schools. Like other communities in the Ohio River Valley, Huntington was regularly visited by damaging floods, and business owners and community members were typically self-reliant in the aftermath. After the unprecedented damage of the 1937 flood, however, community and business leaders decided that more substantive preventative measures were necessary. Immediately following the flood, the Chamber of Commerce pushed for the construction of a floodwall that would protect Huntington and the surrounding areas.

After a prolonged fight and a legal battle that made it to the West Virginia Supreme Court, the flood wall was approved, and the project was taken on by the United States Army Corps of Engineers. Since its completion in 1943, the Huntington floodwall has prevented an estimated $238.8 million in flood damage.

Other areas of West Virginia were devastated by the flood as well. The Wheeling island had to be evacuated, as it was completely submerged when the flood crested at 47 feet. In Parkersburg, the river reached a crest of 55 feet.
