= Kentucky Department of Corrections =

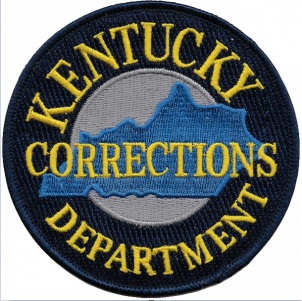
- Kentucky DOC shoulder patch

Jurisdictional structure
- Operations jurisdiction: Kentucky, USA
- Kentucky Prisons (Hover mouse over pog to popup clickable link)
- Map of Kentucky Department of Corrections's jurisdiction
- Governing body: Kentucky Justice and Public Safety Cabinet
- General nature: Local civilian police

Operational structure
- Headquarters: Frankfort, Kentucky
- Agency executive: Cookie Crews, Commissioner

Website
- KDOC Website

The Kentucky Department of Corrections is a state agency of the Kentucky Justice & Public Safety Cabinet that operates state-owned adult correctional facilities and provides oversight for and sets standards for county jails. They also provide training, community based services, and oversees the state's Probation & Parole Division. The agency is headquartered in the Health Services Building in Frankfort.

== Facilities ==
=== State-owned or operated ===
Following is a list of Kentucky state prisons:

Name	Location	Security level	Year opened	Population (2015)	Notes
Bell County Forestry Camp	unincorporated Bell County, Pineville address	Minimum	1962	300	
Blackburn Correctional Complex	Lexington	Minimum	1972	320	
Eastern Kentucky Correctional Complex	West Liberty	Medium	1990	1,689	
Green River Correctional Complex	Central City	Minimum/Medium	1994	982	
Kentucky Correctional Institute for Women	unincorporated Shelby County, Pewee Valley postal address	All	1938	683	Women's facility housing all security levels, including death row.
Kentucky State Penitentiary	Eddyville	Maximum/Supermax	1886	856	Location of male death row and the state execution chamber.
Kentucky State Reformatory	unincorporated Oldham County, La Grange address	Medium	1936	2005	
Little Sandy Correctional Complex	unincorporated Elliott County, Sandy Hook address	Medium/Maximum	2005	1012	
Luther Luckett Correctional Complex	unincorporated Oldham County, La Grange address	Medium/Maximum	1981	987	Kentucky Correctional Psychiatric Center located within the same compound
Northpoint Training Center	unincorporated Boyle County, Burgin address	Medium	1983	1230	
Roederer Correctional Complex	unincorporated Oldham County, La Grange address	Medium/Minimum	1976	1002	Male Intake Facility
Ross-Cash Center	Unincorporated Lyon County, Fredonia address	Minimum	2015	200	Women's minimum security facility adjacent to and operated by the Western Kentucky Correctional Complex.
Southeast State Correctional Complex	Wheelwright	Medium	2020	665	Owned by CoreCivic and previously operated as the private Otter Creek Correctional Center. Leased to and operated by the Kentucky Department of Corrections since September 2020.
Western Kentucky Correctional Complex	Unincorporated Lyon County, Fredonia address	Medium/Minimum	1977	693	Formerly a women's facility. Converted to men's facility in 2015.

=== Private prisons ===
In June 2013, Kentucky temporarily ended its decades-long relationship with Corrections Corporation of America (CCA) (now CoreCivic), closing Marion Adjustment Center in St. Mary, the last private prison at the time that housed Kentucky inmates. This decision was widely applauded across the state, as the tax dollar savings totaled in the millions.

Otter Creek Correctional Center in Wheelright was closed in 2012 amid continued allegations of medical neglect, shoddy security, and sexual abuse of inmates from staff. It is still owned by CoreCivic. On October 18, 2019, Kentucky Governor Matt Bevin announced that the Commonwealth of Kentucky would enter into a ten-year agreement with CoreCivic to lease and reopen the facility. The prison, which was renamed the Southeast State Correctional Complex, is now operated and staffed by the Kentucky Department of Corrections and is managed under the same rules and procedures as state-owned prisons. The prison reopened under state management in September 2020.

Lee Adjustment Center in Beattyville, also operated by CoreCivic, housed out-of-state inmates from Vermont until 2010. In November 2017, due to facility overcrowding, the Kentucky Department of Corrections signed a contract allowing CoreCivic to reactivate the vacant prison to house up to 800 male inmates. These inmates would be transferred from the Kentucky State Reformatory. The facility reopened and began accepting inmates in March 2018.

== Death row ==
The Kentucky State Penitentiary (KSP) houses the male death row. The Kentucky Correctional Institute for Women houses the female death row. Executions occur at KSP.

=== History ===
Between 1967 and 2011, 67% of Kentucky's executions were abolished. For this reason, in 2011 the American Bar Association (ABA) recommended suspending capital punishment in the state. In 2015, Kentucky Senator Robin Webb introduced a death penalty reform bill. The text of the bill called for changes in training for law enforcement and court officials. The bill also focused on the collection and retention of DNA evidence. On March 25, 2022, the Kentucky Senate approved a bill banning the death penalty for people with serious mental illnesses.

== Staffing ==
Since the beginning of the 2015 fiscal year, the department has seen a staffing shortage to low salaries, constant overtime (currently nearing $10 million), and the lure of higher paying jobs in the private sector. In response to this staffing crisis and continued pressure from correctional employees, the Kentucky Legislature held a special session and approved an immediate 13.1% salary increase for current security staff, moved non-security staff to 40 hour work weeks, and increased the starting salary for Correctional Officers from $23,346 to $30,000 annually. Shortly after taking office, former governor Matt Bevin included $4.5 million in his biennial budget proposal to provide retention raises for correctional staff.

== Health care ==
In July 2021, the department won a court ruling allowing it to deny health care to prisoners in order to save money. The ruling pertains to a treatment for Hepatitis C, which cost from $13,000 to $32,000.

== See also ==
- List of law enforcement agencies in Kentucky
- List of United States state correction agencies
- List of U.S. state prisons
- Prison
