= Little Sandy Correctional Complex =

Prison in Elliott County, Kentucky, United States

- Interactive map of Little Sandy Correctional Complex
- Location: 505 Prison Connector Sandy Hook, Kentucky address
- Status: open
- Security class: mixed
- Capacity: 1014
- Opened: 2005
- Managed by: Kentucky Department of Corrections
- Director: Shawn McKenzie

Little Sandy Correctional Complex is a prison located in unincorporated Elliott County, Kentucky, near Sandy Hook. The facility is operated by the Kentucky Department of Corrections. The prison is the most recently constructed state prison in Kentucky, having opened in 2005. The facility had a prison population of 1014 as of 2013.

== History ==
Funds for a new prison was allocated in 1998 under Governor Paul E. Patton to expand jobs and relieve the overcrowding of Kentucky's prisons. December 2, 2001 Gov. Patton, and other public officials broke ground for an 895-bed medium security in Elliott County, Kentucky, on Kentucky 7 about five miles from Sandy Hook.

== Notable inmates ==
- Steve Nunn - Former member of the Kentucky House of Representatives and son of the late Kentucky Governor Louie B. Nunn. Convicted of aggravated murder in the death of his ex-fiancée. Sentenced to life imprisonment without the possibility of parole.
- Michael Carneal - Perpetrator of the 1997 Heath High School shooting.
