= Eastern Kentucky Correctional Complex =

Prison in Kentucky, United States

- Location in Kentucky
- Location: West Liberty, Kentucky; 37°54′17″N 83°16′11″W
- Security class: Maximum
- Population: 2,100 (2019)
- Opened: February 1990
- Warden: James D. Green
- Website: link

Eastern Kentucky Correctional Complex (EKCC) is a minimum and medium-security prison located in West Liberty, Kentucky. It opened in February 1990 and had a prison population of 2,100 as of 2019.
