= Western Kentucky Correctional Complex =

American medium-security prison

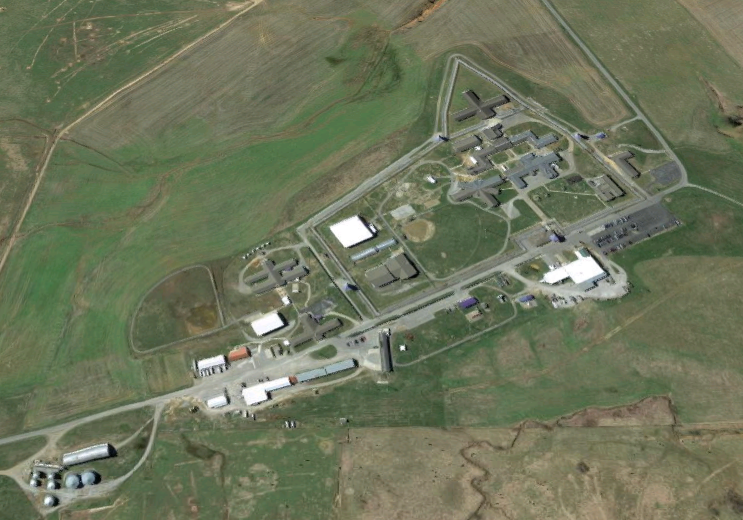
- Overhead view of the WKCC
- Interactive map of Western Kentucky Correctional Complex
- Location: Lyon County, Kentucky, US
- Status: Operational
- Security class: Medium
- Population: 693 (October 2019)
- Opened: 1968
- Former name: Western KY Farm Center
- Website: Official website

Western Kentucky Correctional Complex (WKCC) is a segregated, dual-sex, medium-security prison in Lyon County, Kentucky, near the city of Fredonia. As of October 2019, the facility had 693 prisoners (493 men and 200 women).

== History ==
The facility was built in 1968 to support the Kentucky State Penitentiary (KSP). In 1977, it became its own separate institution, the Western Kentucky Farm Center (WKFC), a minimum-security prison. When WKFC became Western Kentucky Correctional Complex in 1989, medium-security infrastructure was added. The facility was converted from a men's prison to a women's prison in 2010. Five years later, it was divided into two separate facilities: the current men's prison (WKCC) and a separate women's prison—the 200-bed Ross-Cash Center—due to fewer female prisoners; this change was projected to save US$700,000 (equivalent to about $951,000 in 2025) per year and only require 90 days of work to accomplish. Ross-Cash was named for two Kentucky Department of Corrections staff members killed in the 1980s, Patricia Ross (died 1984 at KSP) and Fred Cash (died 1986 at WKFC).

WKCC and Ross-Cash reunited under the WKCC name in 2016, and as of October 2019, was the "only state-level co-ed facility in Kentucky." Sixty-four percent of prisoners were white while the other thirty-six percent were black. Annual imprisonment cost $23,425.70 (equivalent to $29,499 in 2025) per person, while WKCC had an operating budget of $10.7 million (equivalent to approximately $13.5M in 2025).
