= Luther Luckett Correctional Complex =

State correctional institution in Oldham County, Kentucky, United States

Coordinates: 38°24′45″N 85°25′32″W

- Interactive map of Luther Luckett Correctional Complex
- Location: 1612 Dawkins Road La Grange, Kentucky
- Status: open
- Security class: Medium/Maximum
- Capacity: 1,204
- Opened: 1981
- Managed by: Kentucky Department of Corrections

The Luther Luckett Correctional Complex is a Medium/Maximum-security state prison located in unincorporated Oldham County, Kentucky, near La Grange, about 30 miles (48 km) northeast of Louisville. It opened in 1981 and had a prison population 1,204 as of 2018. The Kentucky Correctional Psychiatric Center, which is operated by the Kentucky Health and Family Services Cabinet and is officially a separate facility, is located within the Luther Luckett Correctional Complex and shares several facilities with its host prison.

Due to extreme staffing shortages over the 2015–16 fiscal year, the facility now operates on two 12-hour shifts, five days a week. This has been embraced by some as substantial extra income, and heavily criticized by others due to being away from their families so often, as well as being a major source of mental and physical stress.

The current administration consists of Warden Amy Robey, and Deputy Warden of Programs Laura Plappart. Patricia Gunter is Major of Security.

The documentary Shakespeare Behind Bars, depicting a production of William Shakespeare's The Tempest by prison inmates, was filmed at Luther Luckett.
