= La Grange, Kentucky =

- City
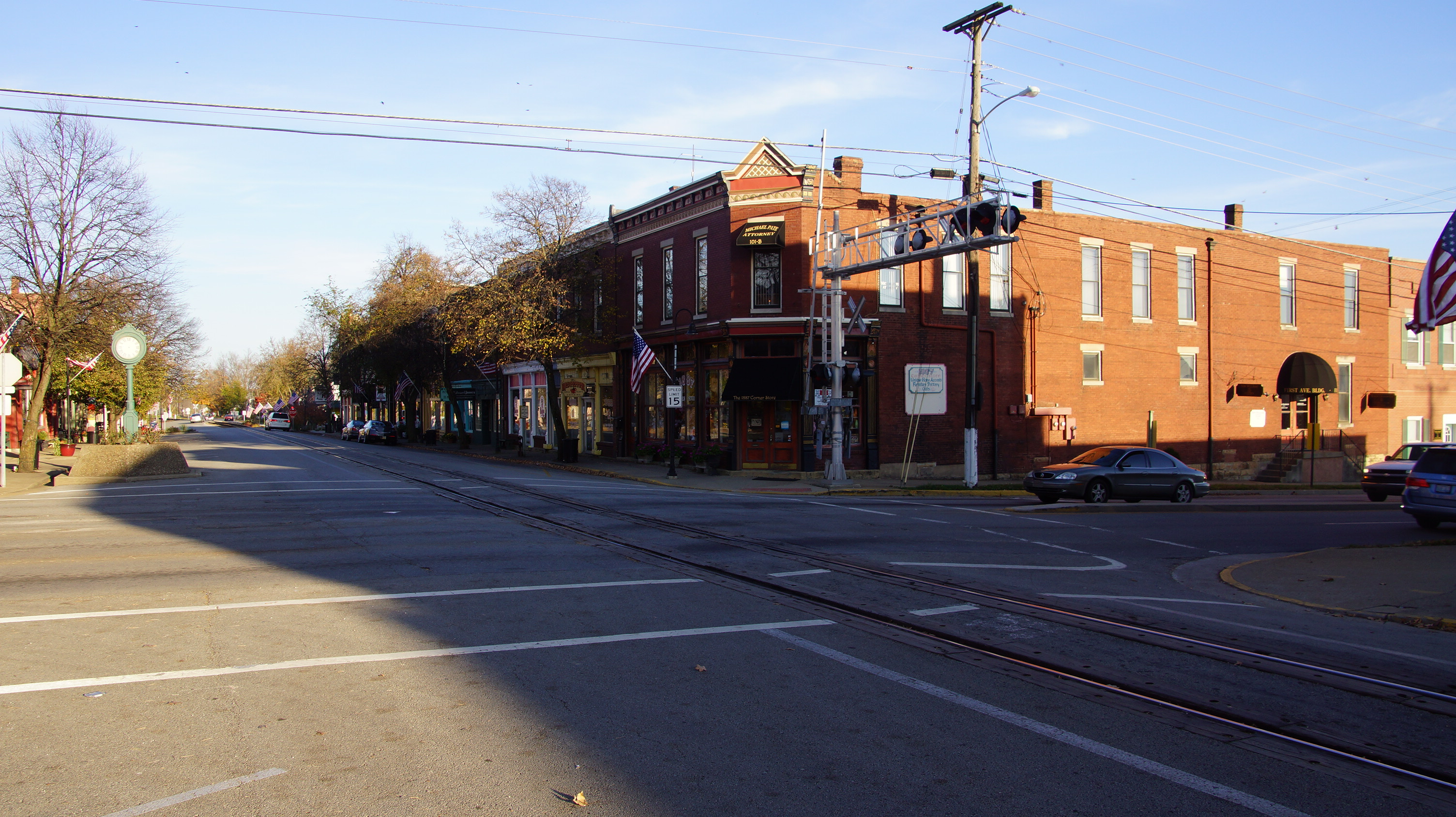
- Downtown La Grange with railroad track running down Main Street

- Location of La Grange in Oldham County, Kentucky.
- Coordinates: 38°23′55″N 85°22′30″W
- Country: United States
- State: Kentucky
- County: Oldham
- Incorporated: January 23, 1840
- Named for: Lafayette's French estate

Government
  - Type: Mayor-Council
  - Mayor: Joe Davenport

Area
  - Total: 7.30 sq mi (18.91 km^{2})
  - Land: 7.22 sq mi (18.69 km^{2})
  - Water: 0.085 sq mi (0.22 km^{2})
- Elevation: 751 ft (229 m)

Population (2020)
  - Total: 10,067
  - Estimate (2022): 10,295
  - Density: 1,394.9/sq mi (538.58/km^{2})
- Time zone: UTC-5 (Eastern (EST))
  - Summer (DST): UTC-4 (EDT)
- ZIP codes: 40031–40032
- Area code: 502
- FIPS code: 21-43480
- GNIS feature ID: 2404848
- Website: www.lagrangeky.gov

La Grange is a home rule-class city in Oldham County, Kentucky, in the United States. The population was 10,067 at the 2020 U.S. census. It is the seat of its county. A unique feature of the city is the CSX Transportation street-running mainline track on Main Street that sees multiple trains in both directions.

== History ==
La Grange was founded in 1827 when the Oldham County seat was relocated from Westport at the suggestion of Major William Berry Taylor. The new town was named for Château de la Grange-Bléneau, the French country estate of Gilbert du Motier, the American Revolutionary hero better known as the Marquis de Lafayette, who had visited the area in 1824. For unknown reasons, the county seat returned to Westport from 1828 to 1838 before settling at La Grange. The city was formally incorporated by the state legislature on January 23, 1840.

== City Mayors ==
While records are scarce, the following list of individuals served as Mayor for the City of La Grange:

- 1840-1910: Board of Trustees
- 1910-1910: Don "Carlos" McDowell
- 1910-1910: Robert T Crowe
- 1910-1912: R.O. Duncan

GAP IN RECORDS

- 1958-1962: Lawrence Teal "LT" Doty

GAP IN RECORDS

- 1963-1969: Walt Severance
- 1969-1977: Raymond Wilborn
- 1978-1981: Forrest "Beano" Hoffman
- 1982-1984: Bob Theiss
- 1984-1993: John W Black
- 1994-2002: Nancy Steels
- 2003-2010: Elsie B Carter
- 2011-2014: William "Bill" Lammlein
- 2015-2018: Joe Davenport
- 2019-2026: John W Black
- 2026-Current: Joe Davenport

== Geography ==
According to the United States Census Bureau, the city has an area of 7.14 square miles (18.5 km^{2}), of which 7.06 square miles (18.3 km^{2}) is land and 0.84 square miles (2.2 km^{2}) (1.17%) is covered by water.

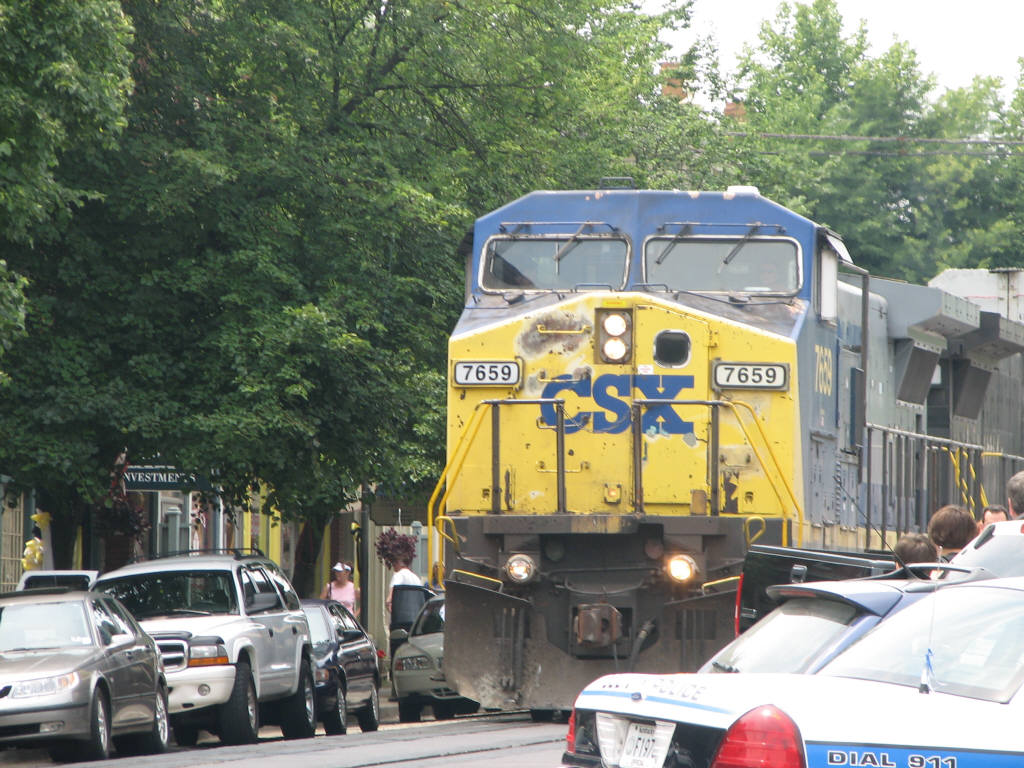
CSX train passing through downtown

=== Climate ===
The climate in this area is characterized by hot, humid summers and generally mild to cool winters. According to the Köppen climate classification system, La Grange has a humid subtropical climate, Cfa on climate maps.

== Demographics ==
Historical population
| Census | Pop. | Note | %± |
|---|---|---|---|
| 1840 | 233 | | — |
| 1870 | 612 | | — |
| 1880 | 490 | | −19.9% |
| 1890 | 670 | | 36.7% |
| 1900 | 646 | | −3.6% |
| 1910 | 1,152 | | 78.3% |
| 1920 | 1,060 | | −8.0% |
| 1930 | 1,121 | | 5.8% |
| 1940 | 1,334 | | 19.0% |
| 1950 | 1,558 | | 16.8% |
| 1960 | 2,168 | | 39.2% |
| 1970 | 1,713 | | −21.0% |
| 1980 | 2,971 | | 73.4% |
| 1990 | 3,853 | | 29.7% |
| 2000 | 5,676 | | 47.3% |
| 2010 | 8,082 | | 42.4% |
| 2020 | 10,067 | | 24.6% |
| 2024 (est.) | 10,541 | | 4.7% |
U.S. Decennial Census

=== 2020 census ===
As of the 2020 census, La Grange had a population of 10,067. The median age was 34.5 years. 30.0% of residents were under the age of 18 and 13.2% of residents were 65 years of age or older. For every 100 females there were 94.5 males, and for every 100 females age 18 and over there were 90.7 males age 18 and over.

91.3% of residents lived in urban areas, while 8.7% lived in rural areas.

There were 3,607 households in La Grange, of which 42.8% had children under the age of 18 living in them. Of all households, 49.7% were married-couple households, 14.2% were households with a male householder and no spouse or partner present, and 29.1% were households with a female householder and no spouse or partner present. About 25.4% of all households were made up of individuals and 12.0% had someone living alone who was 65 years of age or older.

There were 3,775 housing units, of which 4.5% were vacant. The homeowner vacancy rate was 1.5% and the rental vacancy rate was 7.2%.

Racial composition as of the 2020 census
| Race | Number | Percent |
|---|---|---|
| White | 8,099 | 80.5% |
| Black or African American | 461 | 4.6% |
| American Indian and Alaska Native | 77 | 0.8% |
| Asian | 115 | 1.1% |
| Native Hawaiian and Other Pacific Islander | 2 | 0.0% |
| Some other race | 396 | 3.9% |
| Two or more races | 917 | 9.1% |
| Hispanic or Latino (of any race) | 1,032 | 10.3% |

=== 2010 census ===
As of the 2010 census, there were 8,082 people, 2,964 households, and 2,087 families residing in the city. The population density was 1,131.4 inhabitants per square mile (436.8/km^{2}). There were 3,189 housing units at an average density of 446.4 per square mile (172.4/km^{2}). The racial makeup of the city was 87.3% White (83.5% non-Hispanic), 4.7% African American, 0.27% Native American, 0.62% Asian, 0.16% Pacific Islander, 4.6% from other races, and 2.3% from two or more races. Hispanics or Latinos of any race were 8.9% of the population.

There were 2,964 households, out of which 43.1% had children under the age of 18 living with them, 49.9% were married couples living together, 15.5% had a single female householder, 5.1% had a single male householder, and 29.6% were non-families. 25.3% of all households were made up of individuals, and 11.5% had someone living alone who was 65 years of age or older. The average household size was 2.65 and the average family size was 3.17.

The age distribution was 29.8% under 18, 7.2% from 18 to 24, 30.4% from 25 to 44, 20.4% from 45 to 64, and 11.7% who were 65 or older. The median age was 33.8 years. For every 100 females, there were 92.7 males. For every 100 females age 18 and over, there were 86.6 males.

== Correctional facilities ==
The Kentucky Department of Corrections maintains four correctional facilities in La Grange. In 1937, construction began on the Kentucky State Reformatory, the state's largest prison, which opened in 1939. Roederer Correctional Complex, which houses the Assessment and Classification Center where male inmates not sentenced to death enter the state prison system, was built in 1976. The Luther Luckett Correctional Complex and Kentucky Correctional Psychiatric Center, both in the same facility but technically two separate prisons, opened in 1983. About 4,000 inmates of various security levels are housed at these institutions.

== Education ==
La Grange has a lending library, a branch of the Oldham County Public Library.

== Arts and culture ==
The La Grange historic district contains numerous small businesses such as shops, eateries, and art galleries.

CSX Transportation's LCL Subdivision tracks are embedded within Main Street from 4th Avenue to Cedar Avenue creating a unique scenario where the railroad's freight trains join the street's mixed traffic.

The La Grange Railroad Museum runs parallel to the LCL Subdivision tracks. In 2011, the museum obtained the Flying Duchess, a British-built steam locomotive. The museum also has as a dining car and caboose previously owned by the Louisville & Nashville Railroad.

Discover Downtown La Grange is a nonprofit organization dedicated to promoting business, history, and community in the city.

La Grange hosts a Farmers and Artisan Market, a Kentucky Proud Market, where locally made items are sold. The market is open from mid-May through late October.

== Notable people ==
- Tom Blankenship (aka Two Tone Tommy), bassist for My Morning Jacket
- D. W. Griffith, film director known for The Birth of a Nation
- William J. Crowe, former Chairman of the Joint Chiefs of Staff
- Major E. Holmes, dean of the New York State College of Ceramics at Alfred University and founder and head of the Department of Ceramic Engineering at the Missouri School of Mine
- Roland Isaacs, former NASCAR driver
- Robert Mallory, U.S. Representative from Kentucky
- Marvin H. McIntyre, secretary to President Franklin D. Roosevelt
- Buddy Pepper, former songwriter, pianist, composer, arranger, and actor
- Knocked Loose, hardcore punk band founded in 2013.
