= Roma Street, Brisbane =

Street in Brisbane, Queensland

Coordinates: 27.4667°S 153.0196°E

Roma Street
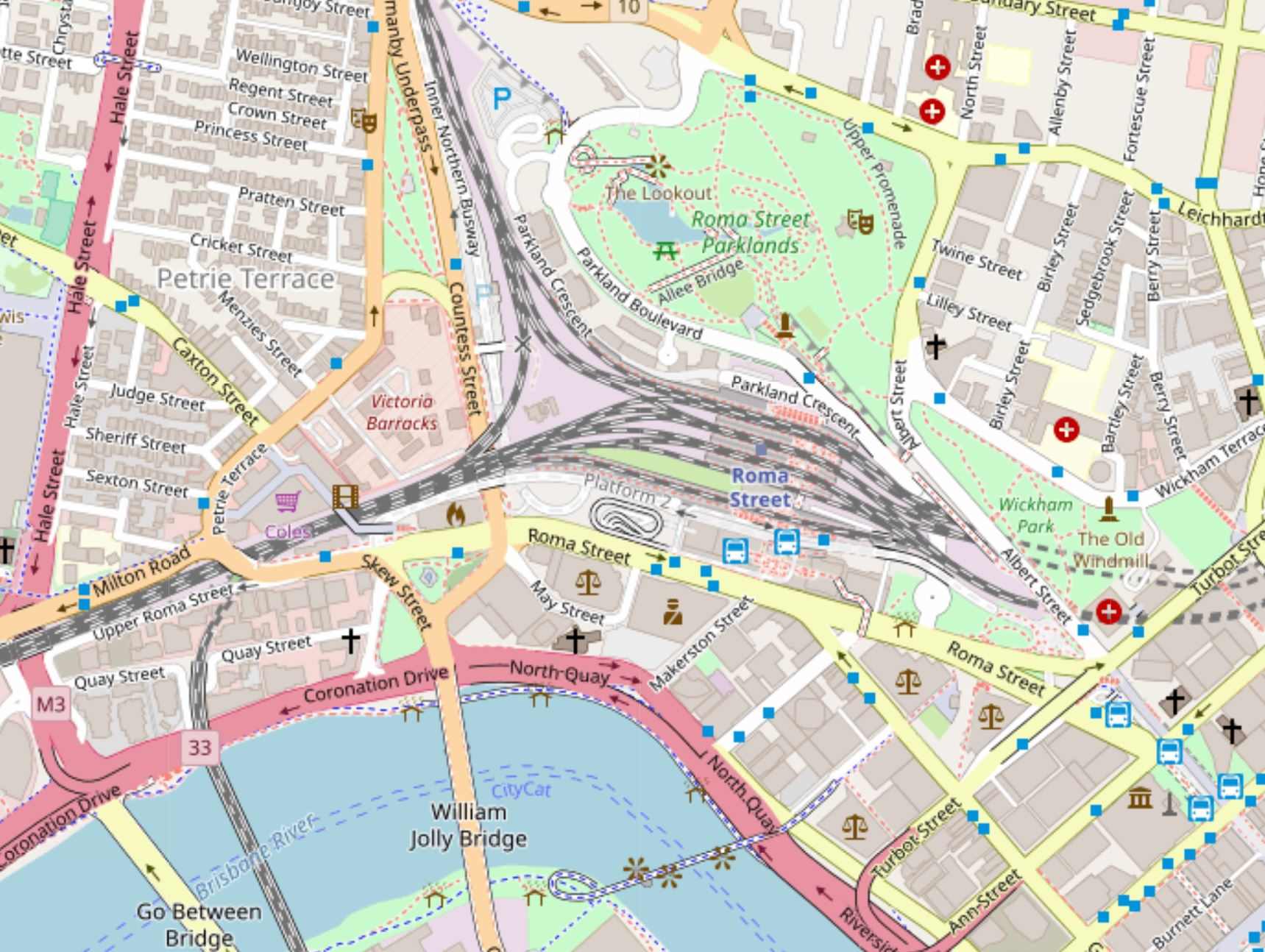
- Roma Street and Upper Roma Street, 2018
- Interactive map of Roma Street
- Location: Brisbane central business district
- North West end: Upper Roma Street (W), Countess Street (N), Saul Street (S)
- Major junctions: George Street, Turbot Street
- South East end: Ann Street

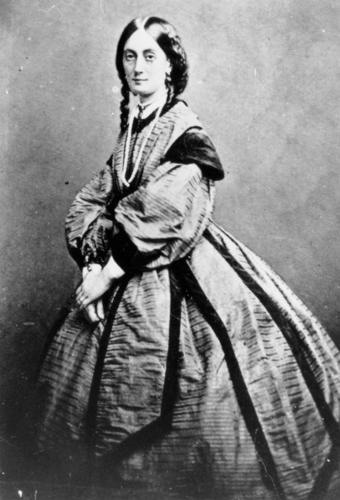
Lady Diamantina Roma Bowen

Roma Street is a major street in Brisbane, the capital of Queensland, Australia. It is named after Diamantina Bowen (née di Roma), the wife of the first Governor of Queensland, George Bowen.

== Geography ==
Roma Street is the main north-west road connecting the Brisbane central business district to the inner north-western suburbs of Milton, Petrie Terrace and beyond. It is approximately 700 metres (2,300 ft) in length from its junction with Ann Street to its junction with Countess and Saul Streets.

Roma Street does not terminate as such at Countess and Saul Streets, but extends further towards the inner north-western suburbs, but becomes named as Upper Roma Street (presumably reflecting the rising terrain), although the street numbering is contiguous with Roma Street, supporting that it is viewed as part of the same street. Upper Roma Street continues for a further 600 metres (2,000 ft).

== History ==
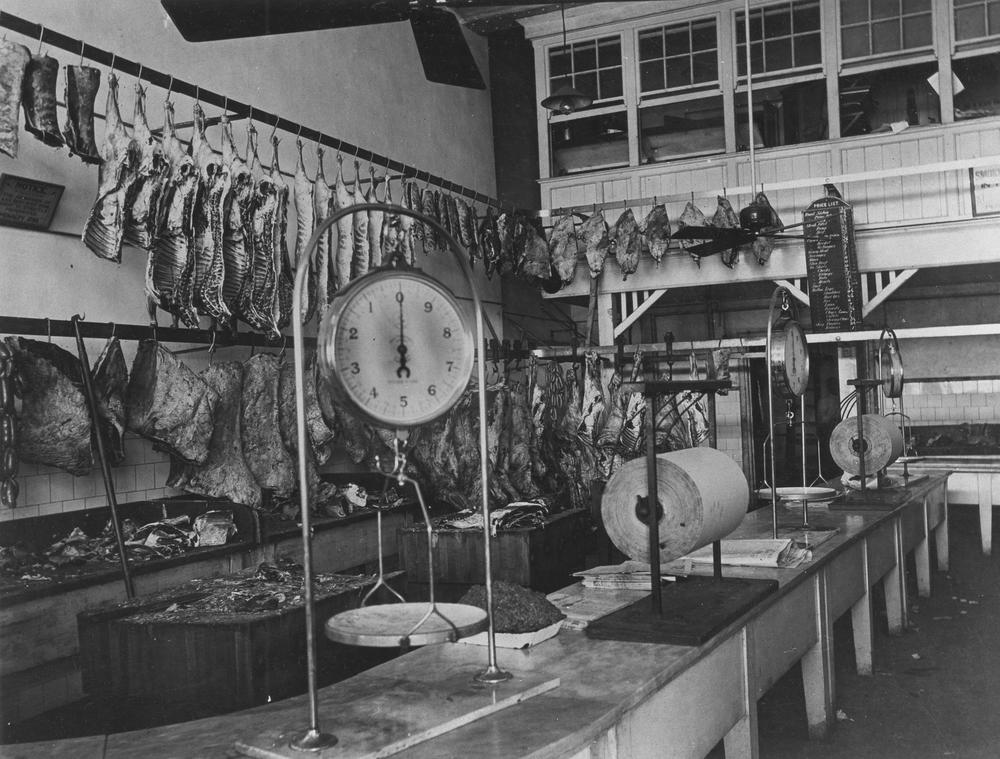
Interior view of the first State butcher shop in Roma Street, Brisbane, ca. 1917

In the 1840s the Roma Street area was used for a major gathering of Aboriginal groups from south-east Queensland, consisting of several hundred people at which the Ipswich group performed a new corrobboree. It is thought to be the last time Aboriginal groups used the area for major gatherings due to the urban growth of Brisbane.

On 12 November 1915 the Queensland Government opened Queensland's first State butcher's shop in Roma Street. In the 1915 Queensland state election, T. J. Ryan's Labor government won office in wartime Queensland on the strength of promises to improve living standards, principally by addressing the problems of high commodity prices, price-fixing and the emergence of monopolies. They believed in public ownership of key economic activities, in competition with private enterprise, but at fair prices. From 1915 to 1929, 90 State butcher's shops operated in Queensland for various periods, but all were eventually closed as being uneconomic to operate.

== Landmarks ==
Many Brisbane landmarks are located on Roma Street (as numbered, starting from the intersection at Ann Street):

- 109: Emma Miller Place, formerly known as Roma Street Forum, is an area of parkland long associated with public protests and soapbox speakers. It was renamed in honour of Emma Miller, a pioneer trade union organiser, suffragist, and key figure in organisations which led to the founding of the Australian Labor Party
- 110: Queen Elizabeth II Courts of Law, Brisbane, a modern courthouse complex occupying an entire triangular city block addressing Roma Street, George Street and Turbot Street
- unnumbered: Transcontinental Hotel, a heritage-listed hotel on the intersection with George Street
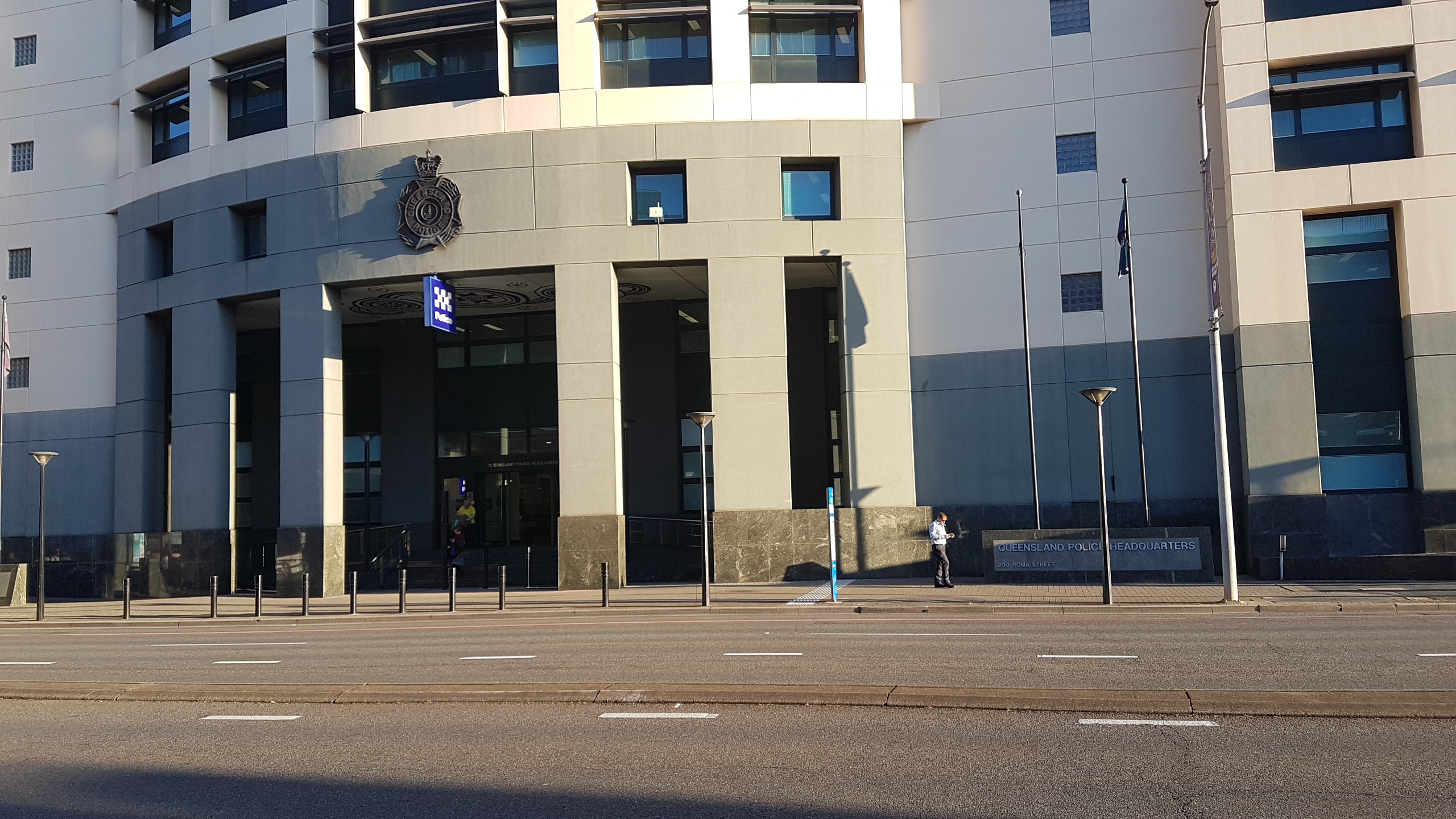
- Entrance to the Queensland Police Headquarters, 2018
  154–158: King George Chambers, built in 1927 as part of a program to modernise the area as a retail precinct (now heritage-listed)
- 151–171: Brisbane Transit Centre, a major railway and bus transport hub for South-East Queensland, sitting beside and partially above Roma Street railway station
- 159: Roma Street railway station, a major railway hub for South-East Queensland rail transport including the heritage-listed 1873 Roma Street railway station building
- (unnumbered): Roma Street Parkland (behind the Roma Street railway station)
- (unnumbered): Roma Street busway station
- 200: Queensland Police Service headquarters, including the Queensland Police Museum

=== Upper Roma Street ===
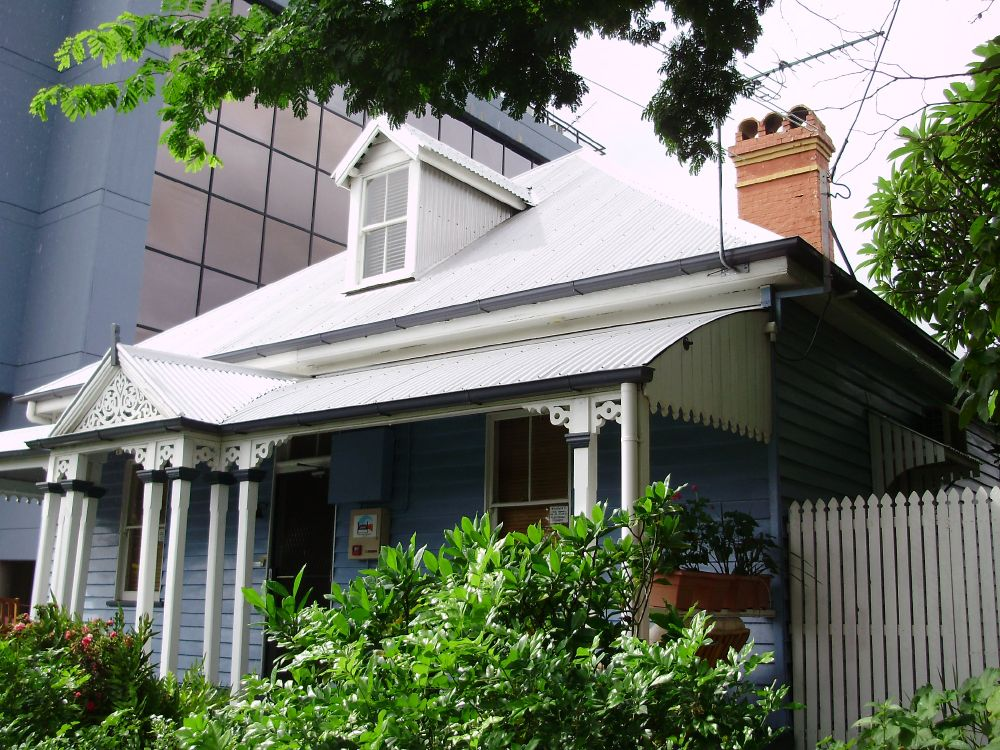
Hellesvere, 2009

Notable landmarks on Upper Roma Street include:

- the site of the First Brisbane Burial Ground (now a park)
- Roma Street fire station
- E.E. McCormick Place, a park named after Edward Escott McCormick who had enabled the Brisbane City Council to acquire the site
- numerous backpacker hostels
- 436: Hellesvere, a heritage-listed house, built in 1873 for Francis Curnow, Commissioner of the Queensland Railways

== See also ==
- Road transport in Brisbane
