= Hellesvere =

Heritage-listed house in Brisbane, Queensland

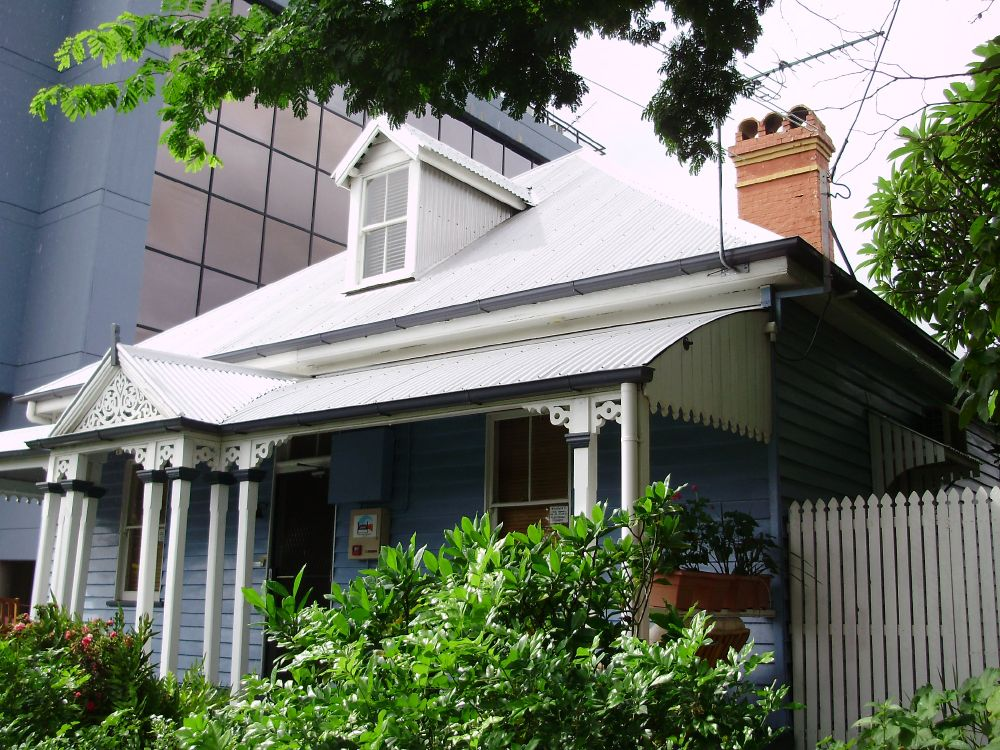
- Hellesvere, 2009

- Location within Queensland Location within Australia
- 27.467°S 153.0119°E
- Location: 436 Upper Roma Street, Brisbane City, City of Brisbane, Queensland, Australia

History
- Design period: 1870s–1890s (late 19th century)
- Built: c. 1877
- Built for: Francis Curnow

Queensland Heritage Register
- Official name: Hellesvere, Eton
- Type: state heritage (built)
- Designated: 21 October 1992
- Reference no.: 600280
- Significant period: 1870s (fabric, historical)
- Significant components: trees/plantings, attic, basement / sub-floor, residential accommodation – main house

Hellesvere is a heritage-listed detached house at 436 Upper Roma Street, Brisbane City, City of Brisbane, Queensland, Australia. It was built c. 1877. It is also known as Eton. It was added to the Queensland Heritage Register on 21 October 1992.

== History ==
Hellesvere, a timber cottage on Upper Roma Street, was constructed in about 1877 for Francis Curnow who became Queensland's third Railway Commissioner.

The site of Hellesvere was part of a larger block acquired by land speculator, James Gibbon, in 1852. In 1875, when some of Gibbon's block was resumed for the construction of the Brisbane Terminal Railway Station (now Roma Street railway station), the remaining land was subdivided for sale.

By 25 August 1877, Francis Curnow, who was an employee of the railway, bought one of the allotments and it was on this land that Hellesvere was soon after built. Curnow arrived in Queensland in March 1860 from Cornwall in Britain and by 1866 settled in Ipswich as a railway storekeeper, a position made necessary by the opening of the Ipswich-Grandchester line. He was promoted in January 1877 to the position of Chief Clerk in the Railway Commissioner's Office, a position second only to that of the Commissioner. The offices for the staff of the Secretary for Railways in Queensland were established on the grounds of the original Brisbane Terminal Station at Roma Street, possibly in the early Brisbane Grammar School, resumed for railway purposes.

In 1877 Curnow built Hellesvere, close to his place of work, on the block of land he bought from Gibbons. Hellesvere was a timber cottage with a steeply pitched corrugated iron roof containing an attic with dormer windows on the northern and southern sides.

In January 1884 Curnow was promoted to be the position of Acting Commissioner for Railways and on 12 March 1885 was again promoted to the position of Commissioner for Railways. Curnow was the third person to hold this position, superseding Arthur Orpen Herbert who became the Under Secretary for Railways.

During the time of Curnow's employment as Commissioner of Railways, the Railways Act (1888) was introduced to create a Board of three Commissioners to oversee decision making in the railways, in a bid to reduce political influence. The appointment of the Board of Commissioners on 29 July 1889 prompted Francis Curnow to retire from the railways with a pension of £500. He was soon after appointed Chairman of the Metropolitan Transit Commission, a position he held until shortly before his death from typhoid fever induced heart failure at Hellesvere, on 24 April 1901. He was buried at Toowong Cemetery.

Early photographs of Hellesvere show that the house has been changed very little externally, simple timber balustrades have been removed from the sides of the northern (front) verandah and a similar balustrade has been removed from the rear. A room enclosed on the western end of the southern (rear) verandah. An early photograph shows a tree in the front yard similar to that extant now in the same place.

Hellesvere appears as the name of Curnow's house from the 1885–1886 edition of the Queensland Post Office Directories. Hellesvere remained in the Curnow family until 1909. It was then sold to George Keal and then changed hands many until it became the property of John Dimitriou Architects. During its history Hellesvere has been used as a boarding house and as flats. In the 1930s, owner Mrs Curtis named it Eton and operated it as a boarding house. John Dimitriou Architects were responsible for the removal of more recent accretions and the reconstruction of some early details.

When describing the house in the 1982 publication, More Historic Homes of Brisbane, Ray Sumner states that the building "stands in a street of intact but mutilated old houses". Now, however, Upper Roma Street retains almost no small residences like Hellesvere, these houses have been replaced with large office and temporary accommodation boarding facilities. Hellesvere is therefore an important and rare remnant of what was an early residential street in inner-city Brisbane, containing such homes as Roma Villa and Highmead, the house of early pioneer Simeon Lord.

In 2015, Hellesvere was operated as Eton Hostels.

== Description ==
Hellesvere is a single storeyed timber residence with attic and partial basement situated on Upper Roma Street, overlooking, to the north, a railway cutting and beyond this Red Hill. The house now subsumes most of the block with a narrow driveway on the eastern side and a small parking lot to the south. Many early plants and trees survive around the building.

The building is generally a timber-framed cottage clad with chamferboards which sits on a brick foundation and basement. Verandahs runs along the southern and northern elevations of the building. The pyramidal corrugated iron roof of Hellesvere is penetrated on the north and south elevations with dormer windows. A brick chimney stack with three flues also projects toward the western edge of the roof.

The principal entrance facade, facing Roma Street to the south, is symmetrically arranged with a central doorway flanked by vertical sash windows. The verandah awning which is supported on pairs of stop-chamfered timber columns with decorative fretwork brackets, features a projecting triangular pediment infilled with fretwork emphasising the entrance.

The windows on the east and west sides of the building are shaded with corrugated iron clad timber framed hoods with vertical battened returns. The lower level of the western face of the building has two entrances' a pair of French doors and a more recent single door.

Internally the building is arranged with rooms off a central hall, towards the rear of which is a timber boarded door leading to a timber stair with cantilevered treads providing access to the attic. The attic which comprises two rooms, separated by a half glazed door, has a raked ceiling following the roof line, projecting through which are the dormer windows.

Generally the interior has beaded timber boards for internal partitions, the external walls and attic ceiling are clad internally with beaded boards with an additional central bead. Toward the south of the house V-J timber boards are used for internal partitions. A door at the end of the hallway provides access to the rear, southern verandah.

The lower floor is accessed via a timber stair with cantilevered treads similar to the internal stair, and this stair is on the rear verandah. At the base of the stairs and running along the line of the first floor verandah is timber decking from which two doors are accessed to the lower floor. Though much internal re-arrangement is obvious on the lower floor an early brick oven recess is evident in what is now the boardroom.

== Heritage listing ==
Pursuant to the transitional provisions of the Queensland Heritage Act 1992, all buildings listed in the Schedule to the Heritage Buildings Protection Act 1990 were taken to be places entered provisionally in the Queensland Heritage Register. Hellesvere was transferred as a provisional entry to the Heritage Register on the basis that it was listed in the schedule to the Heritage Buildings Protection Act 1990. This decision was effective as from 21 August 1992, the date of proclamation of the Queensland Heritage Act 1992.

Further to the transitional provisions of the Queensland Heritage Act 1992, Hellesvere entered permanently in the Queensland Heritage Register on 21 October 1992, having satisfied the following criteria.

The place is important in demonstrating the evolution or pattern of Queensland's history.

Francis Curnow, a distinguished employee of the Railway, built Hellesvere near his workplace at the first Brisbane terminal railway station which had been recently completed. Hellesvere is one of the very few extant nineteenth century buildings on or near Roma Street and provides evidence of the early residential nature of this area.

The place demonstrates rare, uncommon or endangered aspects of Queensland's cultural heritage.

Hellesvere is one of the very few extant nineteenth century buildings on or near Roma Street and provides evidence of the early residential nature of this area.

The building is a good intact example of an 1870s Queensland house in the inner city, with a rare extant basement kitchen. Such houses were once commonly found in the city but are now rare.

The place is important in demonstrating the principal characteristics of a particular class of cultural places.

The building is a good intact example of an 1870s Queensland house in the inner city, with a rare extant basement kitchen. Such houses were once commonly found in the city but are now rare.

The place is important because of its aesthetic significance.

The building has aesthetic value as a well composed timber dwelling which is a landmark on Upper Roma Street as an early building with distinctive steeply pitched pyramidal roof.

The place has a special association with the life or work of a particular person, group or organisation of importance in Queensland's history.

Hellesvere is important as the house of Francis Curnow, the third Railway Commissioner of Queensland, employed in the late nineteenth century when the expansion of the railway was the major force behind the development of the infant colony of Queensland.
