= 1873 Roma Street railway station building =

Heritage-listed building in Brisbane, Queensland

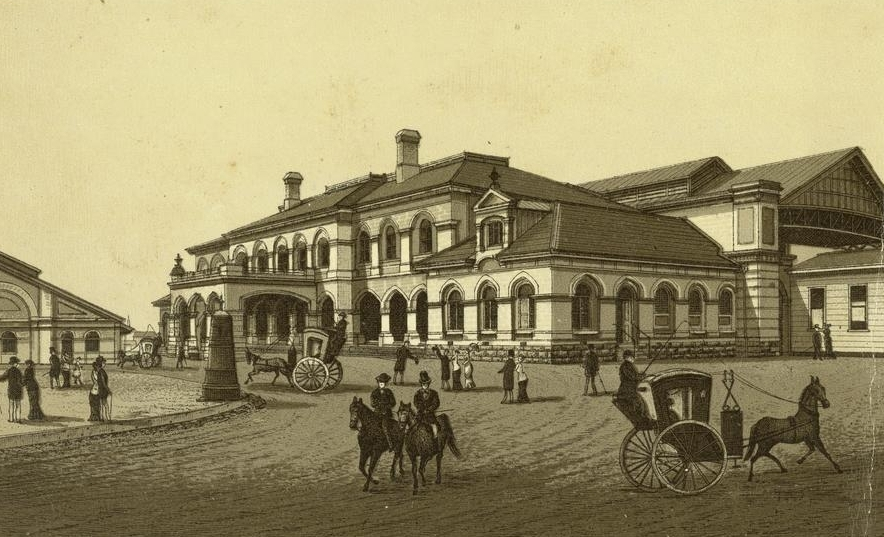
- Roma Street railway station, circa 1883

- Location within Queensland
- 27.4656°S 153.0187°E
- Location: 159 Roma Street, Brisbane CBD, City of Brisbane, Queensland, Australia

History
- Design period: 1870s–1890s (late 19th century)
- Built: 1873–1940s circa

Site notes
- Architect: Francis Drummond Greville Stanley
- Architectural style: Classicism

Queensland Heritage Register
- Official name: Roma Street Railway Station, Brisbane Passenger Station, Brisbane Terminal Station, Brisbane Terminus
- Type: state heritage (built)
- Designated: 24 March 2000
- Reference no.: 601208
- Significant period: 1870s–1910s (historical); 1870s–1910s (fabric); 1870s–ongoing (social)
- Significant components: foyer – entrance, office/s, views to, railway siding, railway station, furniture/fittings, platform, platform canopies/awnings (railway), ticket box/office
- Builders: John Petrie

The 1873 Roma Street railway station building is a heritage-listed railway station building at Roma Street railway station, 159 Roma Street, Brisbane central business district, City of Brisbane, Queensland, Australia. It was designed by Francis Drummond Greville Stanley and built from 1873 to 1875 by John Petrie. It is also known as Brisbane Passenger Station, Brisbane Terminal Station, and Brisbane Terminus. It was added to the Queensland Heritage Register on 24 March 2000.

== History ==
The first Roma Street railway station was constructed in 1873–1875 as the first Brisbane terminus for the Main Line railway and was the Brisbane terminus for the Southern and Western railway lines via Toowoomba. The building was designed by FDG Stanley, the Superintendent of Public Buildings in 1873 and built over the next two years by Brisbane builder, John Petrie.

The Queensland Parliament passed the Railway Act in 1863, enabling the first railways to be constructed. A railway survey had been undertaken by the New South Wales Government in 1856 prior to the separation of Queensland in 1859, but it was the Moreton Bay Tramway Company who, on constructing a wooden-railed horse hauled tramway between Ipswich and Toowoomba in 1861, pioneered rail transportation to Queensland. Queensland's sparse population discouraged rail transportation as non-viable.

The initial Main Line railway which ran between Ipswich and a small town near Ipswich, Bigge's Camp (or Grandchester as it is now known) was opened in 1865. This was the first stage of a four-stage project to provide railway connections into the major towns on the Darling Downs. The second stage was to link Ipswich through to Toowoomba via the Main Line in 1867. The final two stages were the Western railway line linking Toowoomba to Dalby in 1868 and the Southern railway line linking Toowoomba to Warwick in 1871.

Terminating the railway at Ipswich meant that goods were then transferred to ships at Ipswich to reach Brisbane or beyond. The Ipswich community was opposed to the extension of the railway to Brisbane, as goods would then be transferred to ships in Brisbane, diminishing Ipswich's role as a port. Despite Ipswich's opposition, the Queensland Government ordered a preliminary survey of a railway line between Ipswich and Brisbane which was completed in November 1865.

By 1872 a report of the Royal Commission on Railway Construction was presented to Parliament which made a case for the extension of the South-West Railway into Brisbane. The case for the railway line was adopted and plans were immediately made for a survey which estimated the cost of the rail link to be £192,000, or £8,000 per 1 mile (1.6 km) of line. Previously a decision was made to adopt a narrow gauge of 3 ft 6 in, rather than the wider gauge adopted in other states and this reflects the general attitude toward the construction of railway lines and stations in Queensland in these first years, that of providing adequate facilities economically. On 30 January 1873, the first sod was turned on the extension of the line to Brisbane by the Queensland Governor, George Phipps, 2nd Marquess of Normanby.

As part of the planning for the new line, a major station was planned at the Brisbane Terminal at Roma Street. This building was originally to be an imported iron station building from Britain designed by Sir C. Fox and Son. The downturn in the state's economy in the late 1860s, resulted in a smaller station which was built to a design of FDG Stanley in 1873–1875. The order for the iron building was cancelled, not, however, before certain elements were in transit from London; consequently a large iron carriage shed arrived and was dismantled for use on a number of projects.

In October 1873, a tender notice appeared in the Queensland Government Gazette for the construction of the railway station in Brisbane. FDG Stanley who was the Superintendent of Buildings within the Public Works Department at the time, was the designer of the building. The tender of John Petrie was accepted in on 1 December 1873. The building was then built over the next two years.

In the Brisbane Courier, "Summary for Europe", which appeared on 30 October 1873, detailed plans of the new Terminus Passenger Station were provided:

The Station will be erected in the Green Hills, just outside the western fence of the Grammar School and facing Roma Street from which it will be distant 100 yards. The general style of the building will be that known as the Italian Gothic order of architecture. The material used...will be pressed brick with cut stone facings, this being chosen on account of its durability and as also affording the greatest consonant with economy. The station will consist of a main building, two storeys high, flanked at each end by a single storey wing...On the ground floor...will be the booking offices, station master's offices, waiting rooms and other offices connected with ordinary railway travel. The upper floor will be devoted to the offices of the traffic and engineering staff...The plans have been designed by Mr FDG Stanley, Superintendent of Public Buildings.

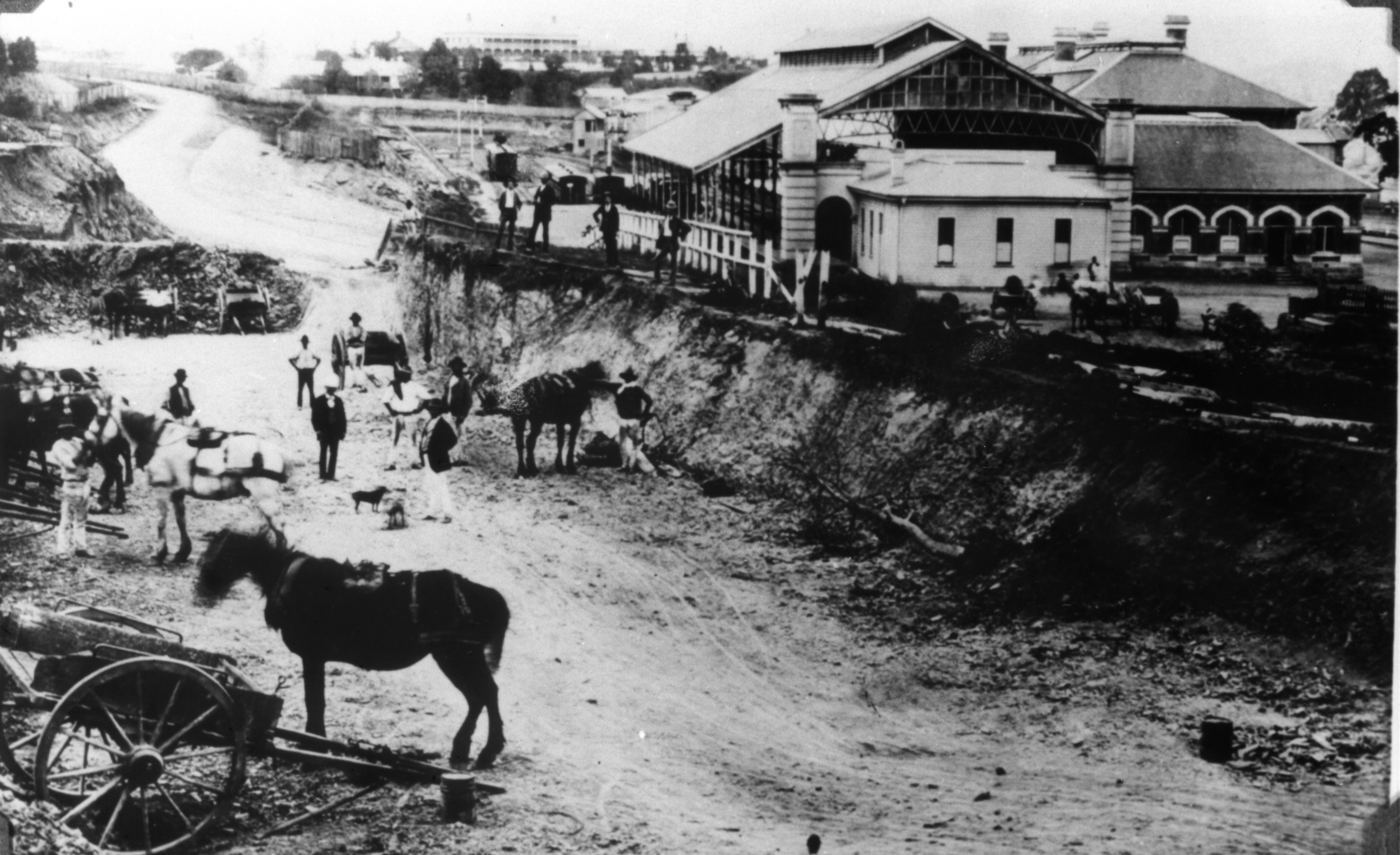
Railway construction at Roma Street, circa 1873

The line was opened as far as Oxley Point railway station (now known as Chelmer railway station) by February 1875, but the bridge across the Brisbane River to Indooroopilly was not constructed until later, and the trains were shunted across the river on punts. Despite its incomplete state, the line from Ipswich to Brisbane was officially opened on 14 June 1875. At the opening, the platform at Brisbane Passenger Station was half-paved and the rooms and corridors incomplete, the roofing over the platform was still in progress and the place lit temporarily .

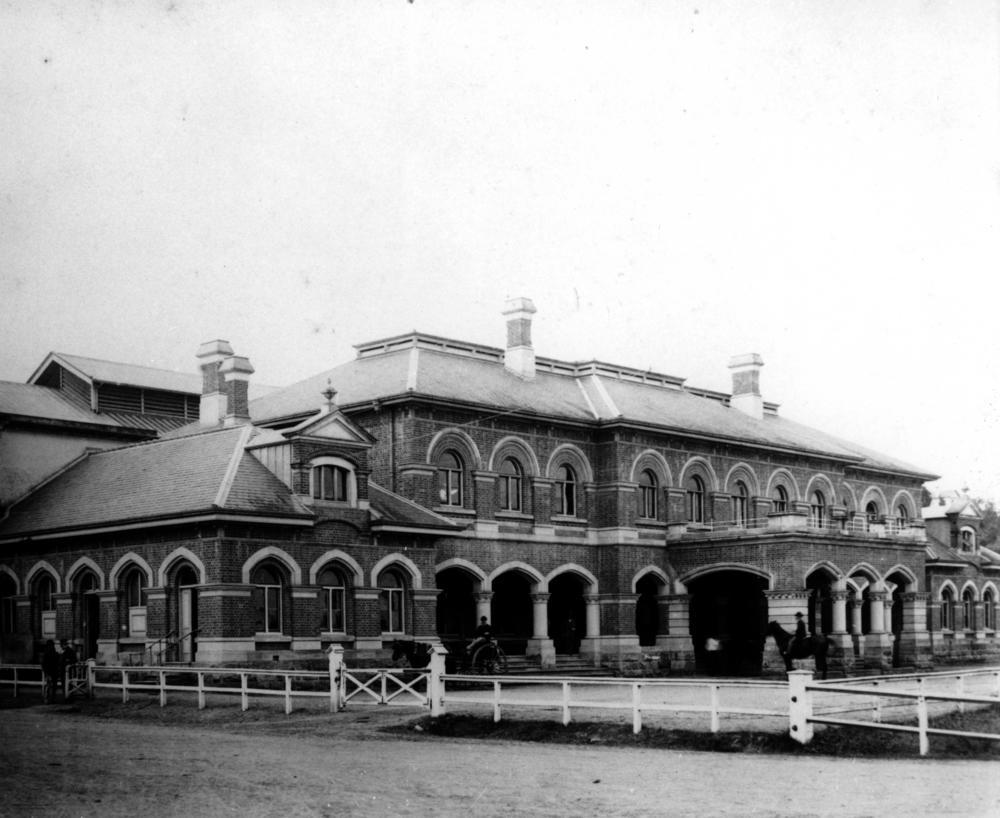
View from Roma Street, circa 1890

The station was designed to house staff and facilities associated with rail traffic, including the station master, booking office and waiting rooms. A large goods shed was erected at Roma Street in 1875–1876 and sidings were introduced to incorporate the new building. The cost of this work was £7446. The next major addition to the station was a rail bridge over Countess Street also planned in 1876 when Parliament voted £19,600 for construction of this and other improvements at the station. The bridge measured 66 feet (20 m) and was an iron-plate girder span on brick abutments and was constructed to avoid disturbing road traffic. Other improvements at this time include construction of a number of cattle yards.

Roma Street railway station and the surrounding railyards has been dramatically altered over the years of its use. In 1911 the railyard was established at Roma Street and the entire site was replanned. The next major change occurred in the early 1940s when the Country Station was constructed between the original Terminal Station and Roma Street. The most recent, and most significant change to the railway station occurred in the 1980s when the transit centre, incorporating the Travelodge Hotel was constructed (now Centra).

A number of sources suggest that the original carriage shed was erected as a temporary measure. By 1882 a new carriage shed was erected and the terminal station platforms extended. Also during this year the Sandgate railway line was opened to Sandgate further increasing traffic through Roma Street station. In 1889, the Brisbane Central railway station was opened and the original Brisbane Terminal Station became known as the Roma Street railway station. Construction of buildings, including a gas works, stores buildings and engine sheds continued as rail traffic increased.

In 1911 a major re-organisation of the Roma Street railway station precinct was planned, involving the removal of locomotive and carriage facilities to the Mayne Rail Yards where a new marshalling yard was built. Roma Street continued to develop during the 1910s and 1920s as the major goods loading point. In 1914 an additional storey was added to the porte cochere of the station building increasing office accommodation on the first floor.

On 30 November 1940 the Country Station was opened at Roma Street. This low-lying face brick building sat directly between the 1873–1875 building and Roma Street. For the first time the early railway station was flanked by platforms and was no longer able to be accessed via Roma Street directly. The new passenger station was designed to relieve congestion at Brisbane Central Station and made Roma Street Station the chief station for long-distance travel. Trains travelling, southward however, still left from South Brisbane railway station prior to the construction of the Merivale Bridge in 1978. The 1940 station was planned amid a large garden setting some of which survives to this day and continued a tradition of substantial and attractive gardens surrounding railway stations in Queensland. When constructed the roof of the 1873–1875 station was clad with slate tiles, during the general refurbishment of the station area following the construction of the 1940 passenger station the roof of the early station was re-clad with corrugated fibrous sheeting.

Platforms and awnings were constantly re-arranged at the Roma Street Station. In 1959 the early iron carriage shed was removed and was replaced with more modest awnings.

During the 1980s the isolation of the original station building was further increased with the construction of the monolithic Brisbane Transit Centre which incorporated new railway facilities along with a hotel, offices and function centre. This development saw the demolition of the 1940 railway station. During the mid-1990s a further re-arrangement and extension of the platforms to the north and south of the early station building occurred.

Several studies through the early 2000s, including by Mark Jones Architects and Bruce Buchanan, investigated the refurbishment of the original station building, which had fallen into serious disrepair. Eventually in 2012, Queensland Rail commissioned the architectural firm, Architectus to complete the design work of a rescue refurbishment of the external fabric. The work included a new slate tile roof to replace the asbestos sheeting. This matched the original roofing. Other work included dismantling of intrusive work of the mid 20th century and stripping on the paint from the brickwork exterior and a replacement pediment at the Western end. The Architectus work (builder Kane Constructions) restored the station building exterior to its former glory. Michael Kennedy was the heritage consultant for the project.

== Description ==
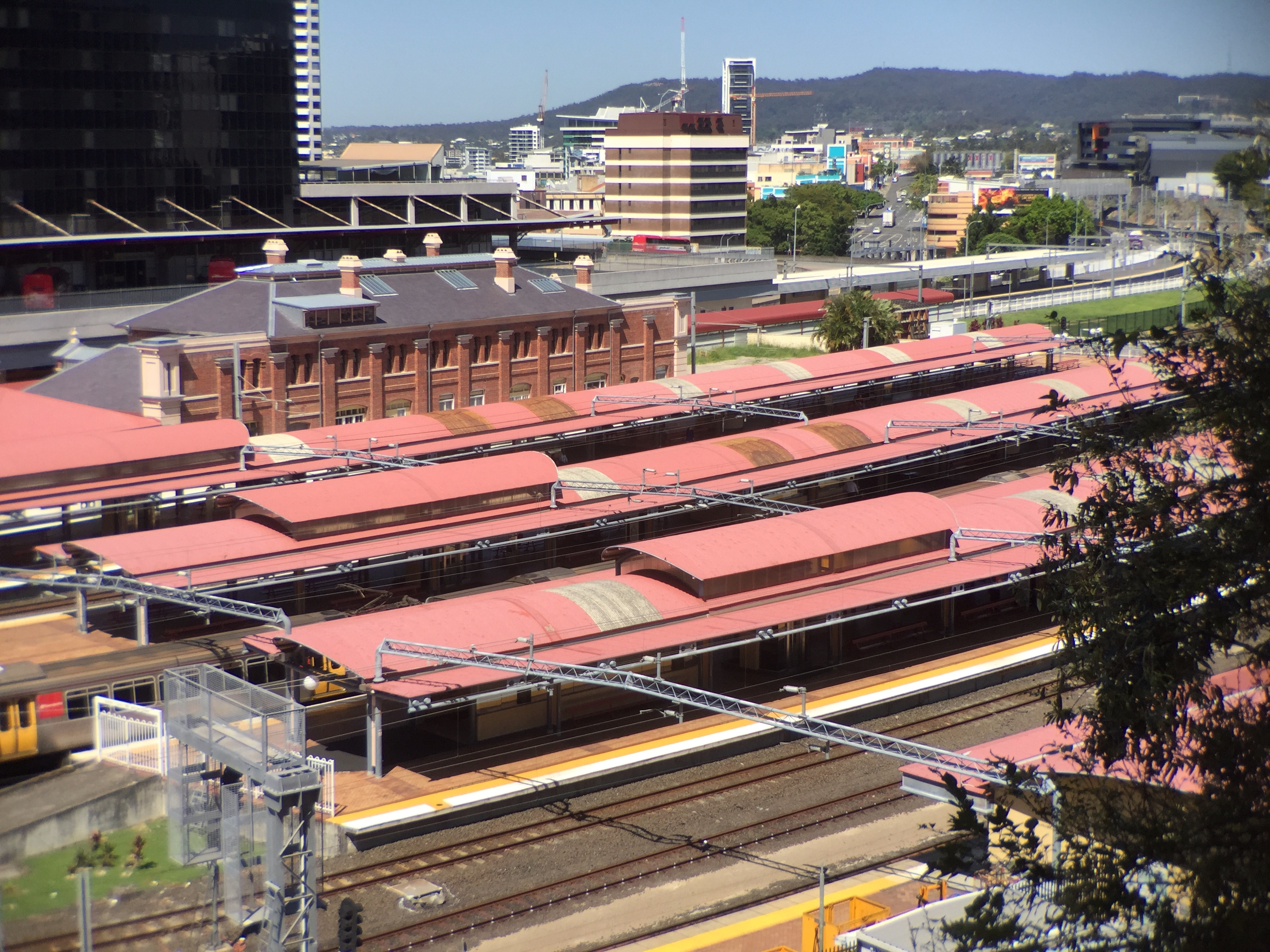
Rear view of the station building, 2015

The 1873 Roma Street railway station is a substantial building constructed of rendered masonry situated between the new Roma Street railway station within the Travelodge (Centra) tower on Roma Street and the platform structures to the rear of this. The building retains some c. 1940s platform awnings and is adjacent to early remnant garden areas.

The 1873–1875 station is a two storeyed building lined to the north and south by platforms. When built the platforms were at the rear, northern edge of the building only. Platforms were introduced to the southern side from the 1940 renovation. At the eastern end of the station building is a large iron roofed and steel framed semi-open space which replaced an earlier similar structure. Several small buildings survive to the west of the station building surrounded by remnant gardens.

The building when constructed was a loadbearing face brick structure with a central two storeyed section flanked by one storeyed wings. The corrugated fibrous cement roof of the station is hipped over the central part and separately hipped over the flanking bays which also feature dormer windows with brick surrounds to the south. The present roof replaced an earlier slate roof. The building has been painted externally.

The building was designed with classical elements including symmetrical massing, southern arcade and porte cochere; round and square arched head windows, castellated parapet detailing, classically inspired mouldings, string course mouldings lining the entire building and pilasters separating openings. A description of the newly completed building described the style as "Italian Gothic", probably reflecting the face brick and stone dressed mouldings of the exterior and the classical elements over the building. The building is a substantial example of a late Victorian Italianate influence.

The central part of the building is divided into three bays, a central bay projects from the southern face of the building and is lined on the ground floor of this face with a porte cochere. The porte cochere comprises rusticated corner columns and round intermediary columns supporting an arcade with castellated parapet. Since original construction a second storey has been added to the porte cochere. The southern face of the upper floor of this central bay is lined with five round arched window openings, with brick surrounds and moulded hoods. The central bay is flanked by side bays each with three round arched windows on the upper floor and a partially enclosed arcade on the ground floor. The windows along the southern side of the building are generally timber-framed double-hung sash windows and along the northern side are aluminium framed sliding windows.

The northern face of the building was originally conceived as an internal wall, inside the original carriage shed. The northern face features a number of irregularly spaced windows and doors along the ground floor, and regularly space squared arched windows on the floor above.

Internally, the building is arranged on the ground floor with a number of rooms openings from the original arcade along the southern side of the building and stair halls at the eastern and western ends of the building providing access to the upper floor. The upper floor is arranged around a substantial central hall articulated by moulded round archways, from which a number of large rooms open.

The ground floor has a concrete floor covering the central bay of the building and timber boarded floors to the eastern and western ends. The arcade on this floor provides access to a large central hall, divided into two by a rendered brick partition and by a curved walled room on the northern side and originally used as a ticket office. The hall was used for waiting rooms and the separation reflects the division between first and second class passengers. Other rooms on the ground are smaller offices, some with timber boarded ceilings. Within these offices are many items of significant furniture which contribute to an understanding of the railway history of the building; including joinery pieces, special cupboards and an early station names board. Large public toilet facilities are found at each end of the ground floor of the building.

The upper floor of the building was designed for use as staff offices and facilities. The two stairways providing access to the upper floor are found at the western and eastern ends of the floor. The eastern stair is a narrow dog-leg timber stairs on a steel frame which dates from about the mid-20th century. The western stair is an earlier timber dog leg stair. The central first floor hallway provides access to a number of large, well lit office spaces. Natural lighting from the windows lining the building is supplemented on both the northern and southern sides with a series of skylights, which though probably not original are certainly an early development of the building and reflect the use of the rooms as offices. The partitioning on the upper floor is constructed with lath and plaster walls and the ceilings are also lath and plaster. The upper floor has more decorative finishes than the lower floor with moulded archways along the hall, and cornices and skirting boards of various sizes in the halls and rooms. Early paint schemes are evident in many places of the upper floor.

== Heritage listing ==
The 1873 Roma Street railway station building was listed on the Queensland Heritage Register on 24 March 2000 having satisfied the following criteria.

The place is important in demonstrating the evolution or pattern of Queensland's history.

The Roma Street railway station was erected in 1873–1875 as the first Brisbane Terminal Station and demonstrates the development of the railway in Queensland, as the earliest Brisbane city station and as the head office of railway administration in the 1870s and 1880s who oversaw the construction of rail lines in Queensland. The building demonstrates the development of Queensland in the 1870s with the construction of major public buildings and the provision of essential public services.

The place is important in demonstrating the principal characteristics of a particular class of cultural places.

The Roma Street railway station demonstrates the principal characteristics of major railway stations in Queensland. The building in its form and layout provides evidence of its former use, with evidence of waiting halls, ticket offices, public facilities and offices. The building has architectural value as a substantial example of the public work of prominent Queensland architect, FDG Stanley.

The place is important because of its aesthetic significance.

The building has architectural value as a substantial example of the public work of prominent Queensland architect, FDG Stanley.

The place has a strong or special association with a particular community or cultural group for social, cultural or spiritual reasons.

The 1873–1875 Roma Street railway station is of social value as an important remnant of an inner city railway station in public use for over 120 years. Because the context of the building has been gradually changed and the building is no longer appreciated as a discrete structure, the surviving railway station contributes to an understanding of the development of the site.
