= Roma Street Parkland =

Public park in Brisbane, Queensland

Coordinates: 27.463°S 153.019°E

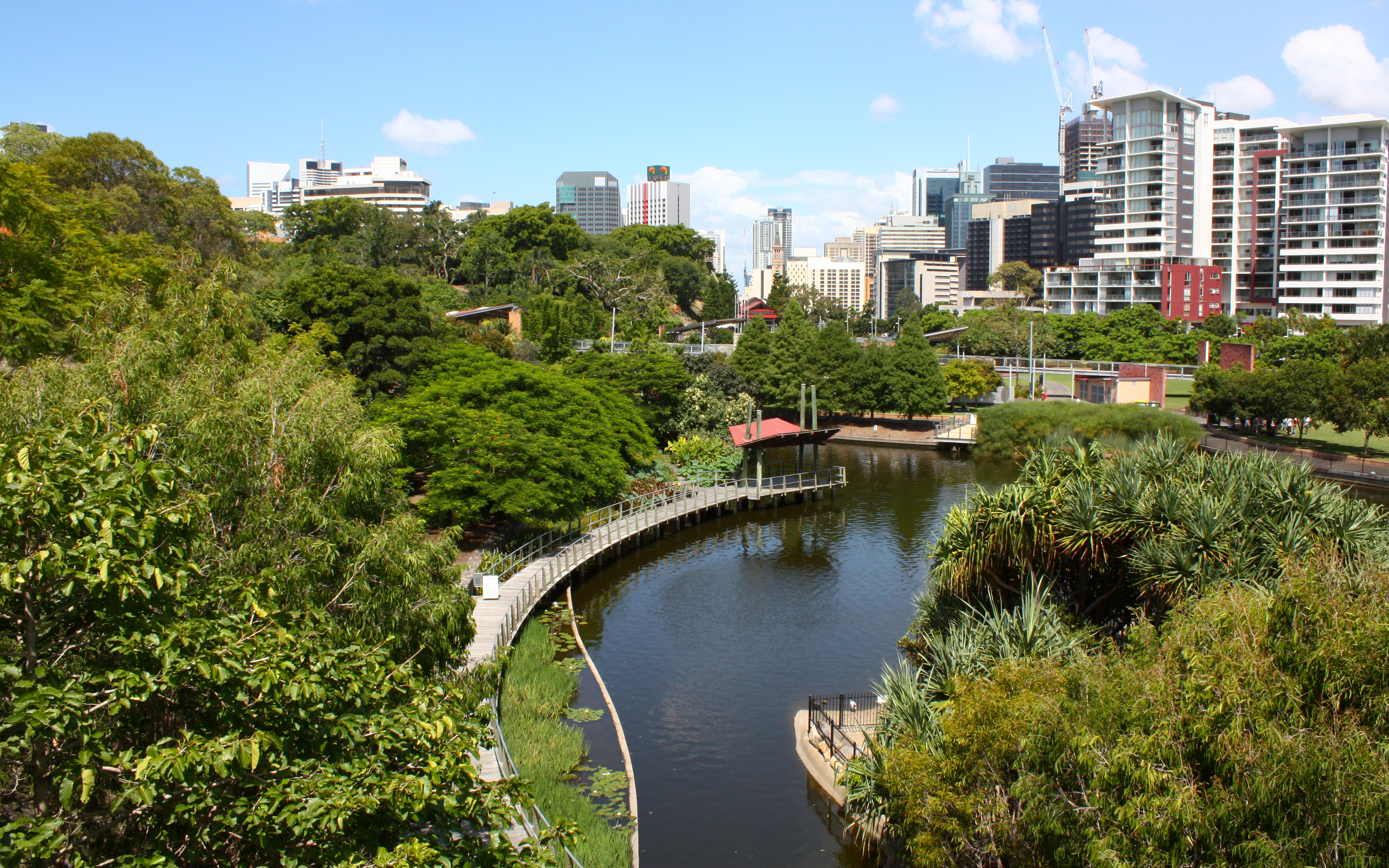
- Roma Street Parklands looking towards the Brisbane CBD
- Interactive map of Roma Street Parkland
- Location: Brisbane, Australia
- Area: 11 hectares (27 acres)
- Created: 6 April 2001
- Operator: City Parklands Transition Services Pty Ltd through Brisbane City Council,

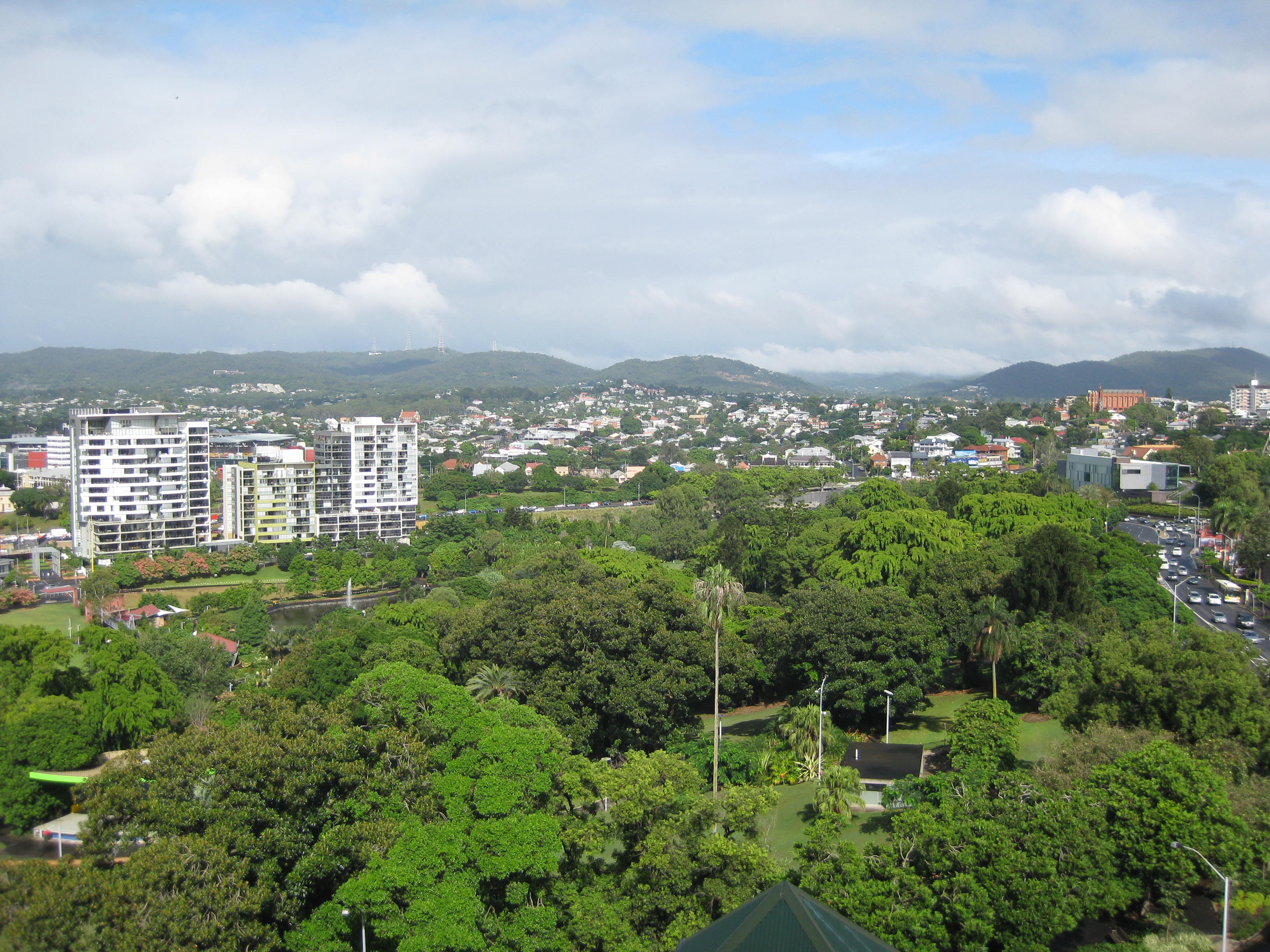
The Roma Street Parkland viewed from the nearby Hotel Grand Chancellor

Roma Street Parkland covers 11 hectares in the centre of the City of Brisbane, Queensland, Australia. The Roma Street Parkland is adjacent to the former Brisbane Transit Centre and the Roma Street railway station from which it takes its name (the park does not directly face onto Roma Street). There is pedestrian access to the Roma Street Parkland from the Roma Street railway station, as well as from Albert Street, and from the section of the Parkland which was formerly called Albert Park on Wickham Terrace. Roma Street Parkland is open to visitors 24 hours a day, except for the Spectacle Garden and Rainforest Walk, which are open daily from dawn until dusk.

There is also a car park area, with road access from the intersection between Wickham Terrace, College Road and Gregory Terrace. Roma Street Parkland is the world's largest subtropical garden in a city centre. The parkland features a variety of themed gardens and recreational areas, with an extensive web of pathways and boardwalks traversing cascading waterways and rocky outcrops, and also in situ artworks by 16 local artists.

== History of the site ==
Local Indigenous people used the area for thousands of years conducting meetings and ceremonies.

In 1825 the Roma Street Parkland area was part of the original Brisbane settlement. In 1875 a railway terminal station on Roma Street was constructed as part of the Main Line railway linking Brisbane to Ipswich and Toowoomba.

The terminal grew to become a major goods yard for Brisbane and, between 1911 and 1934, the area was extensively redeveloped to support its increase in services. In 1920 extensive excavation, removing 554,300 cubic metres of earth, permanently altered the steep terrain creating the current day artificial escarpment and the boundary of the former Albert Park. During World War II, the terminal was vital for transporting war materials and military personnel north.

Continuing to grow, the Roma Street railway station was redeveloped to service a metropolitan and long-distance train network. Because of limitations of the site revealed through the increasing mechanisation of freight handling and the use of containers, the facility was eventually relocated to Acacia Ridge in 1991.

== Roma Street Parkland redevelopment ==
In February 1995, Premier Wayne Goss announced the railway goods yard would be redeveloped as parkland. Construction began in 2000 with the parkland opened to the public in 2001. The design of the new park was created by a landscape architecture and urban design consortium called 'PARC' led by Mark Fuller (Gillespies), Lawrie Smith (Landplan), Malcolm Middleton (DEM Design) and Joe Hruda (Civitas).

The project won its first award before it had opened: a commendation in the Cement and Concrete Association of Australia Streetsmart awards for the innovative concrete finishes created by the use of coloured concrete and an apparently random pattern of rough cast concrete generated by the formworkers which makes the finish appear to change through the day depending on the angle of the sun and the length of shadows cast by the detailing on the walls. The technique was created through a design and construction collaboration between project designers PARC, managing contractor Abigroup and the Queensland Department of Public Works.

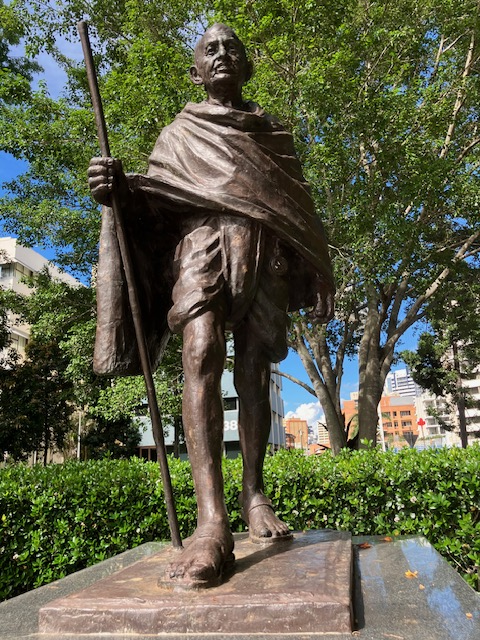
Statue of M. K. Gandhi, 2024

Brisbane's Indian community commissioned a statue of Gandhi, created by Ram V. Sutar and Anil Sutar. It was unveiled by Narendra Modi, then Prime Minister of India in 2014, during the G20.

== Amphitheatre ==
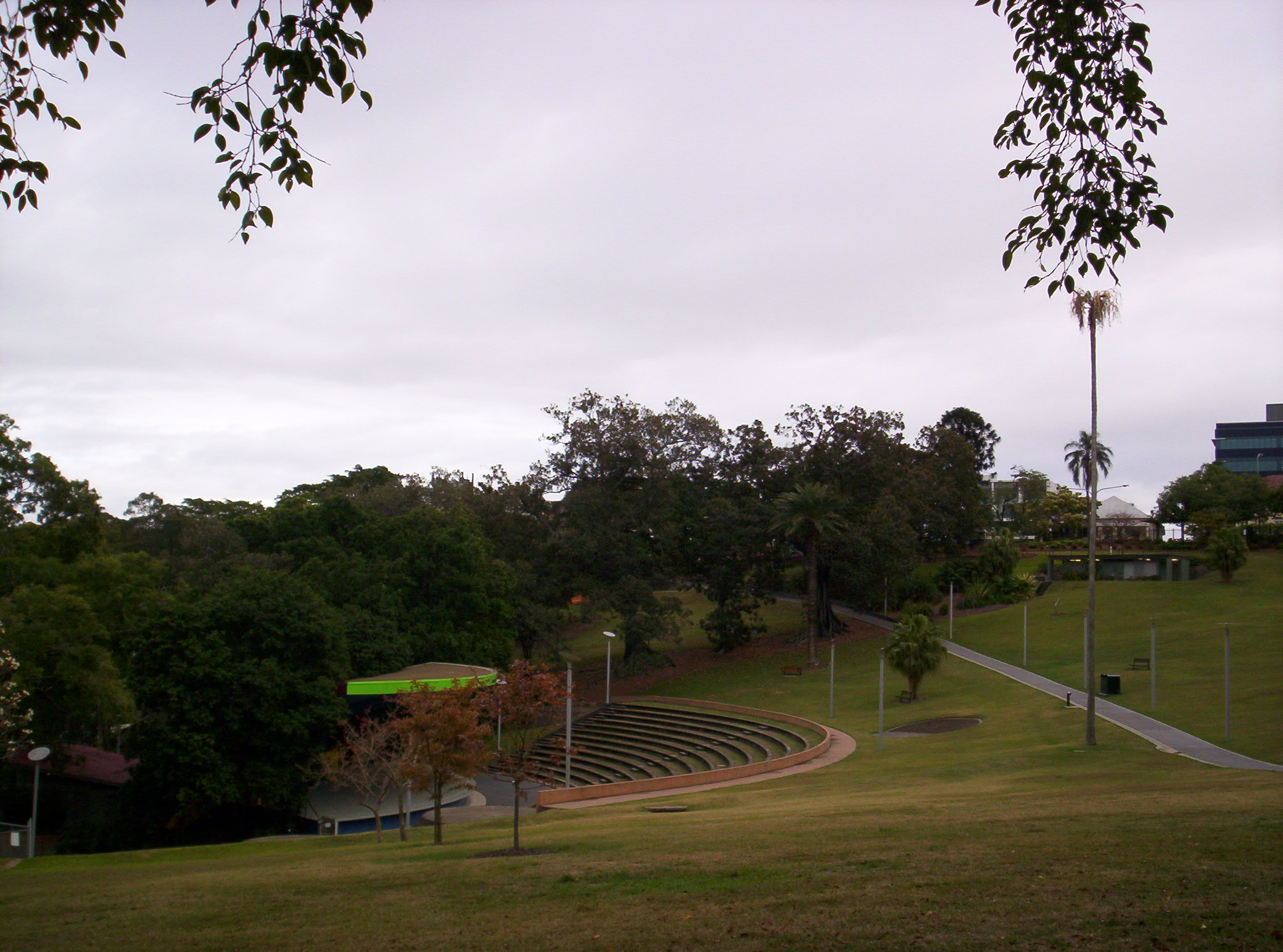
Roma Street Parkland and Amphitheatre

Roma Street Parkland has an open-air amphitheatre, previously known as the Albert Park Amphitheatre, which had been a feature of Albert Park for a number of decades before the Roma Street Parkland was established.

Outdoor film exhibitor Moonlight Cinema holds a licence to operate an outdoor cinema experience within the park, offering hot food, beverages, film festivals, and many other activities during summer months annually.

From lively music festivals and cultural celebrations to family-friendly markets and educational workshops, there is always something happening to engage and entertain visitors of all ages.Plays are performed at the Amphitheatre by the Queensland Theatre Company, and the Queensland Shakespeare Ensemble, as well as by other theatre groups, with many plays by William Shakespeare having been performed at the amphitheatre. The convenient access to the Amphitheatre is through Wickham Terrace near M.K. Gandhi statue.

Other theatre productions, including orchestral concerts, have also been performed there. One such concert, in which the music was by Johann Strauss, was called "Strauss Beneath the Stars", which was presented in October 1983.

The Lord Mayor's Christmas Carols and Brisbane's Carols by Candlelight concerts were held at the Albert Park Amphitheatre before Riverstage was built in the City Botanic Gardens.

== Awards ==
Roma Street Parkland is one of five locations in Australia to hold the 2022/2023 Green Flag Award, an international accreditation given to the world's best green spaces.

== Gallery ==
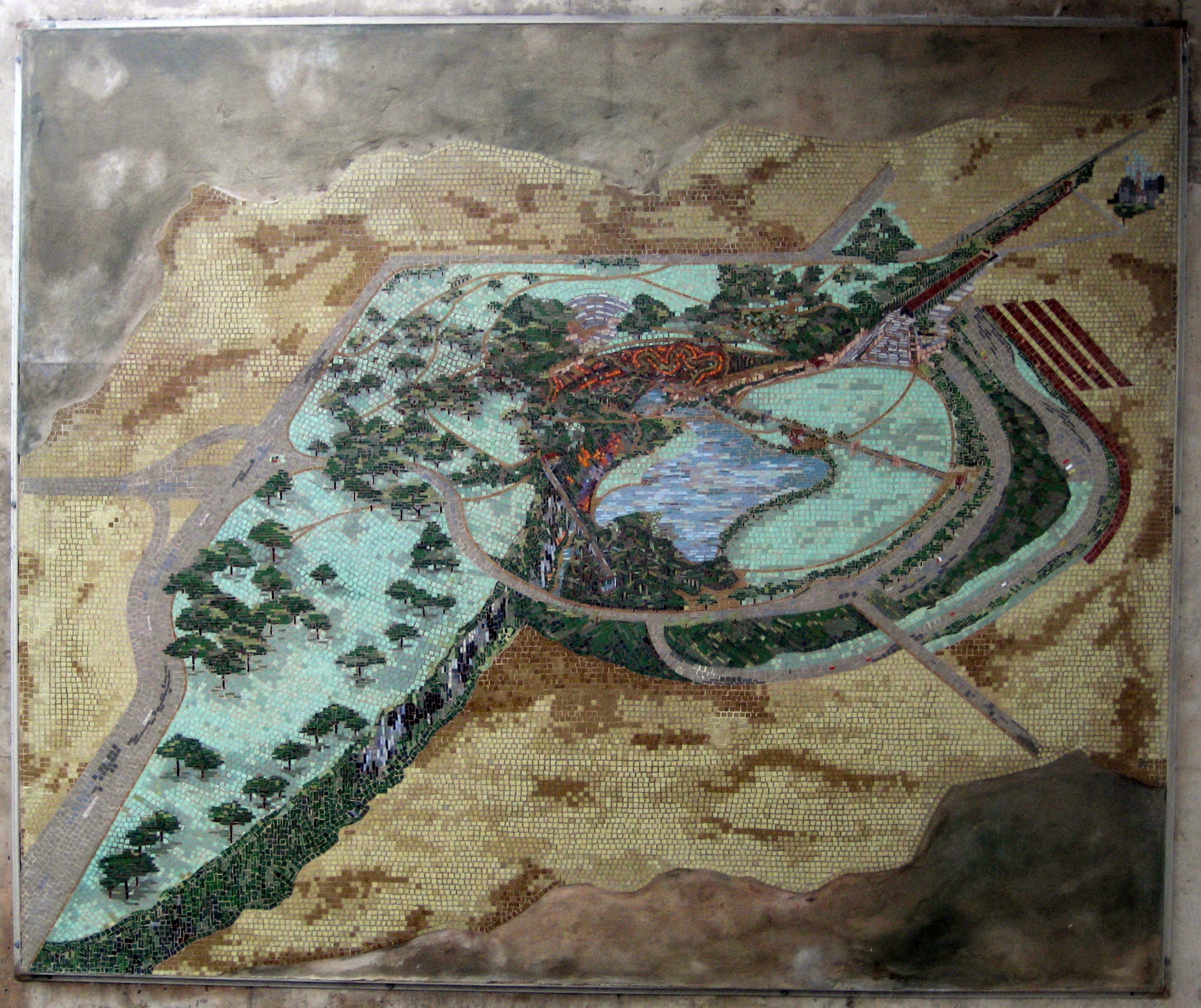
Mosaic map of the park

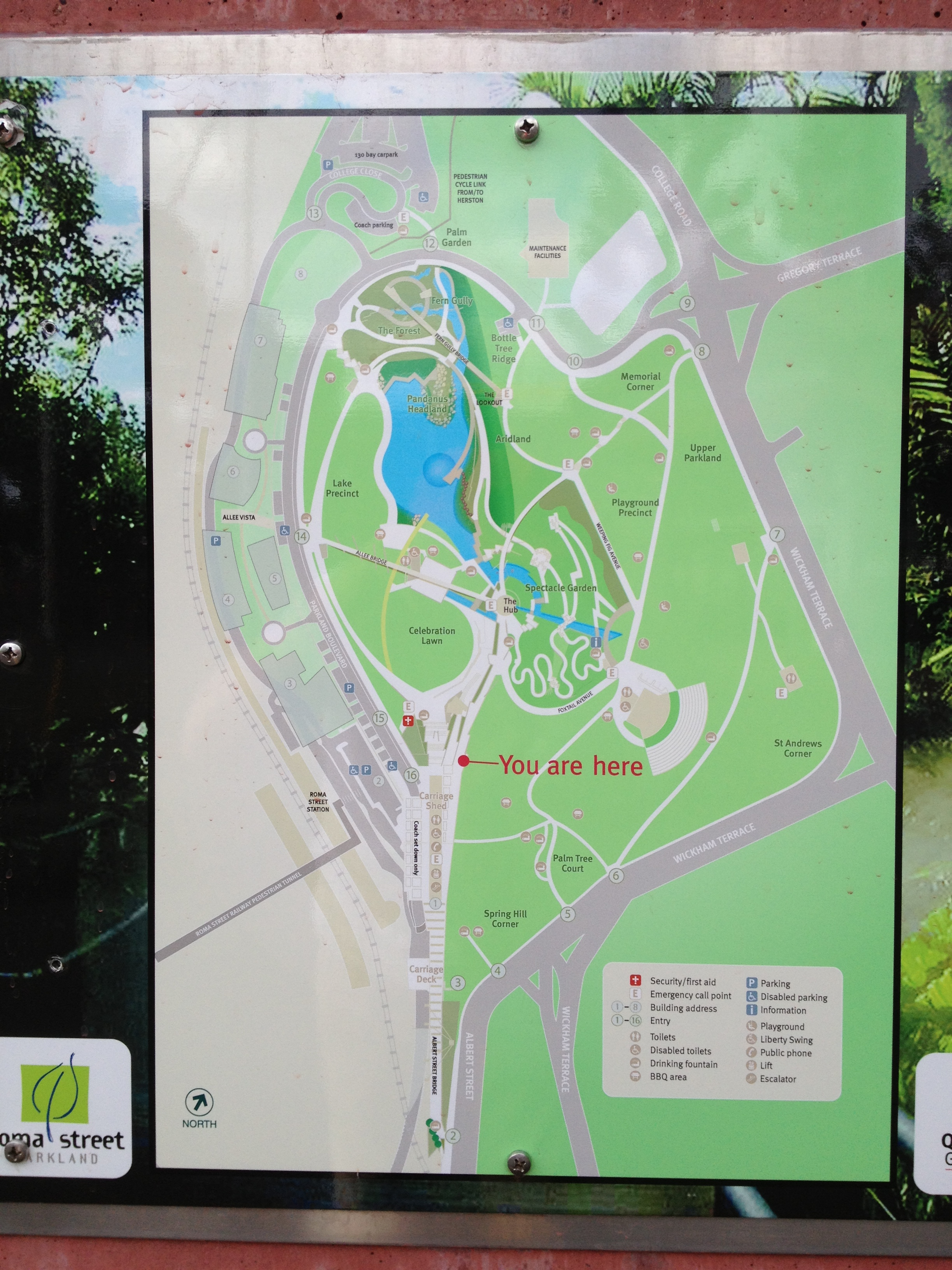
Map of the park

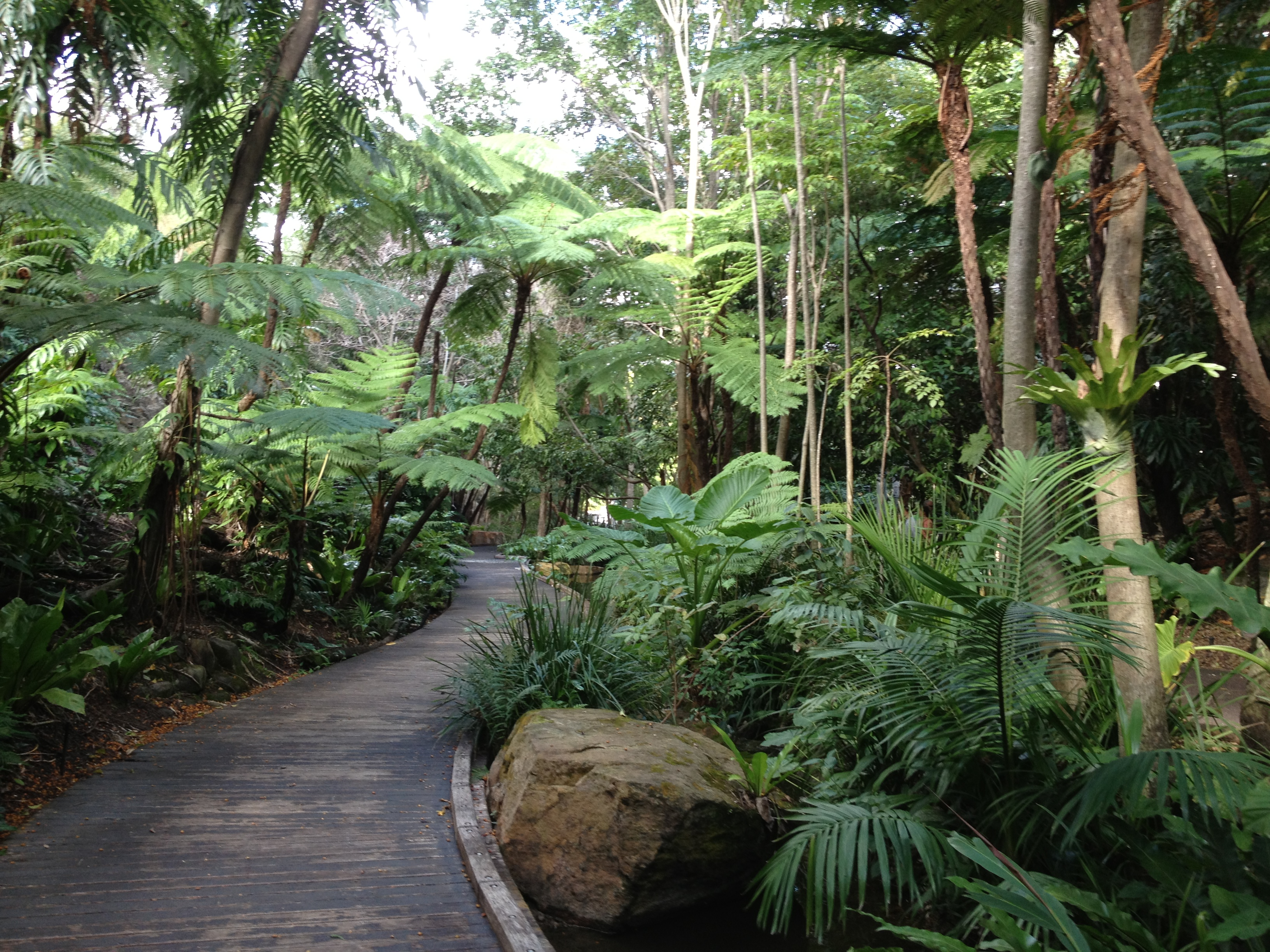
Fern Gully

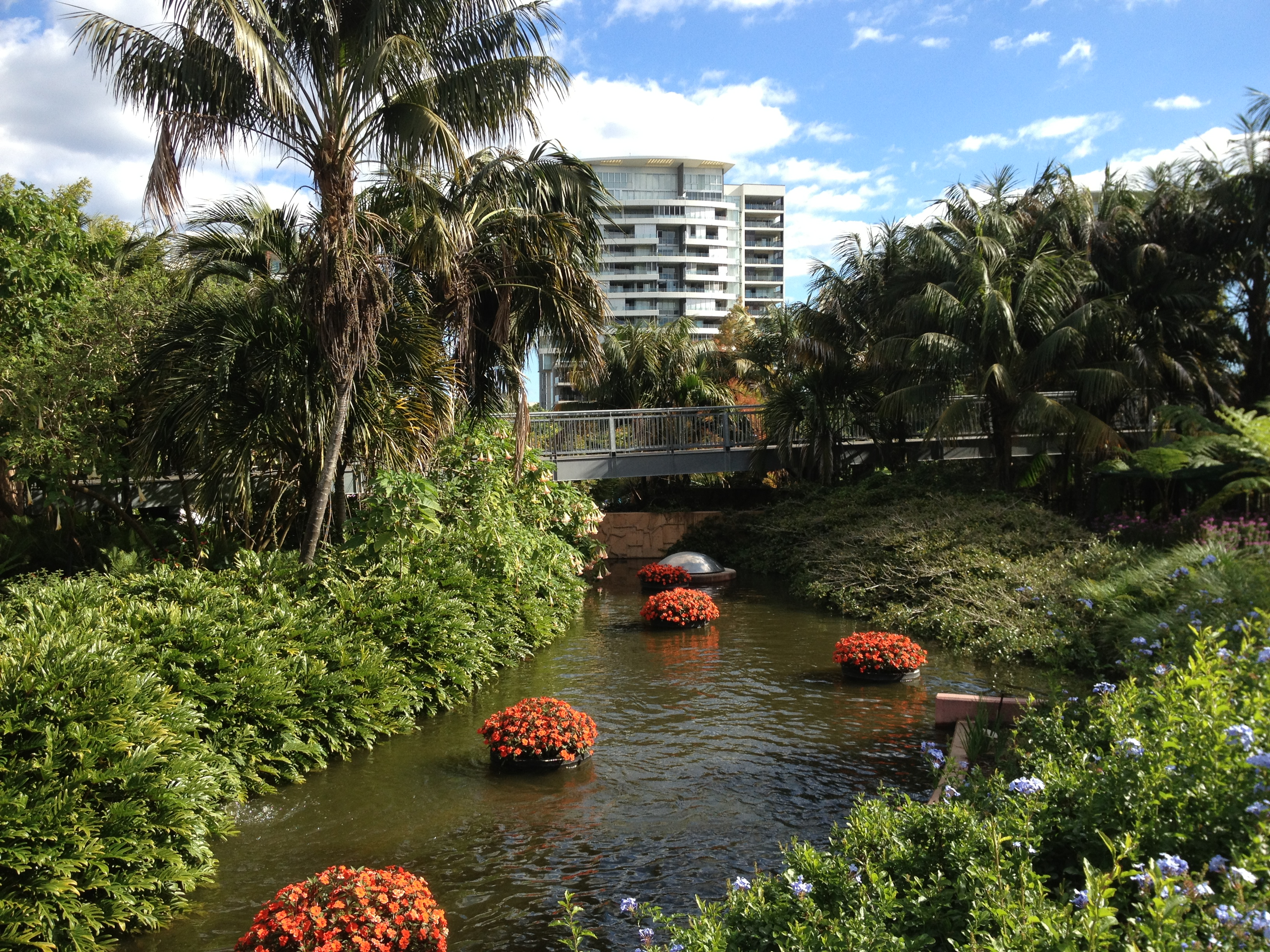
Water feature

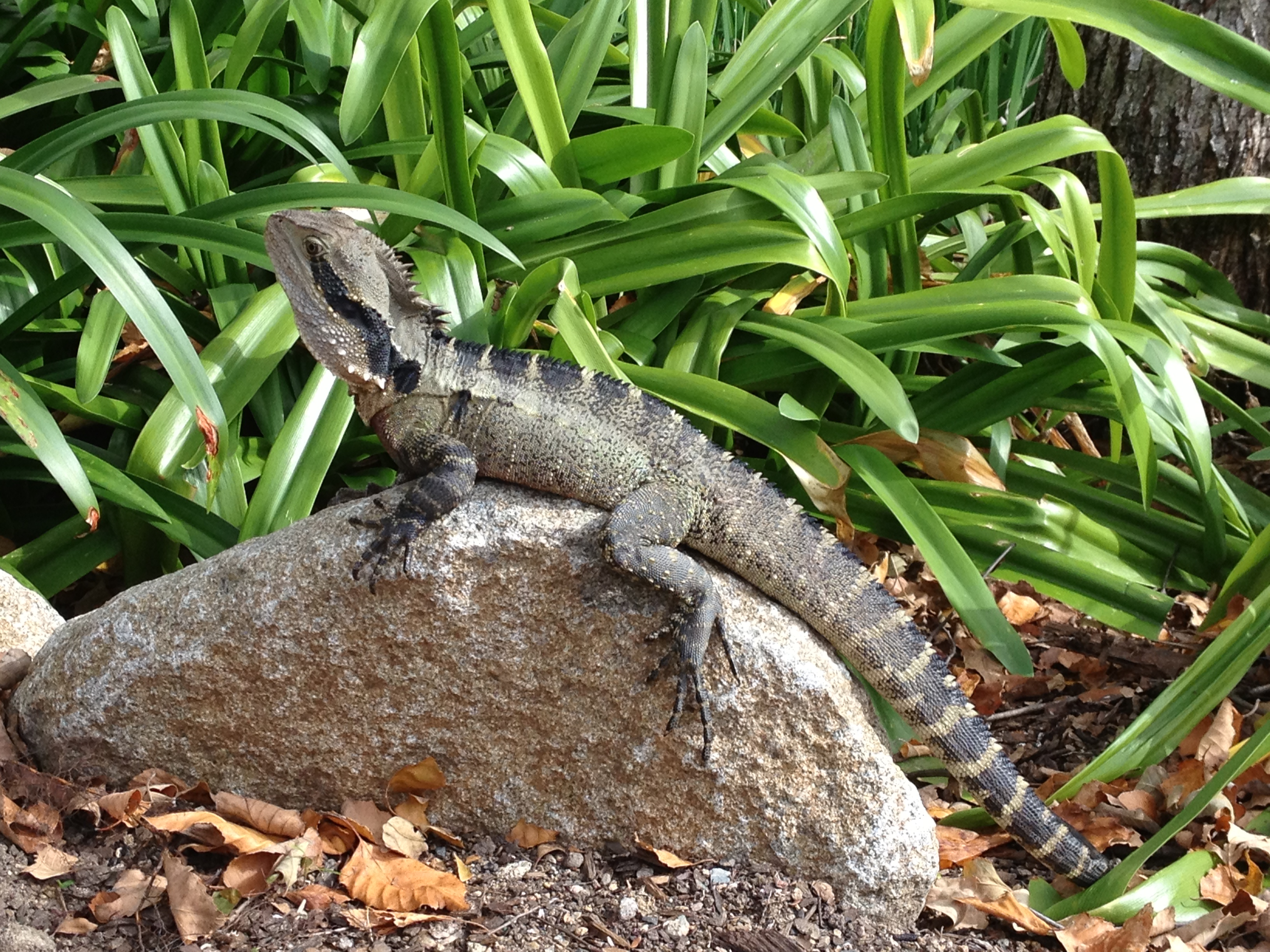
Eastern water dragon in the park.

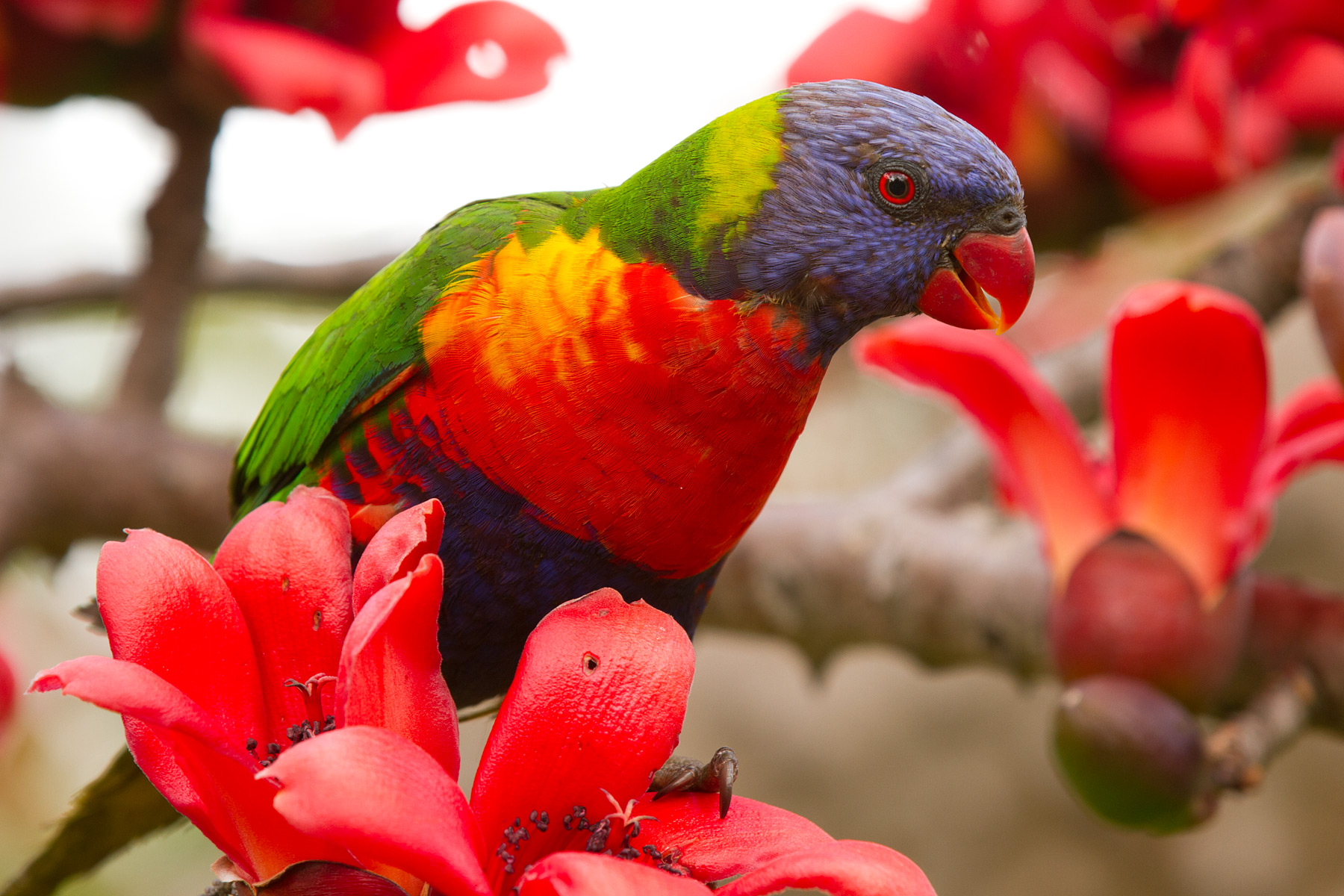
Rainbow lorikeet (Trichoglossus haematodus) in the parklands.

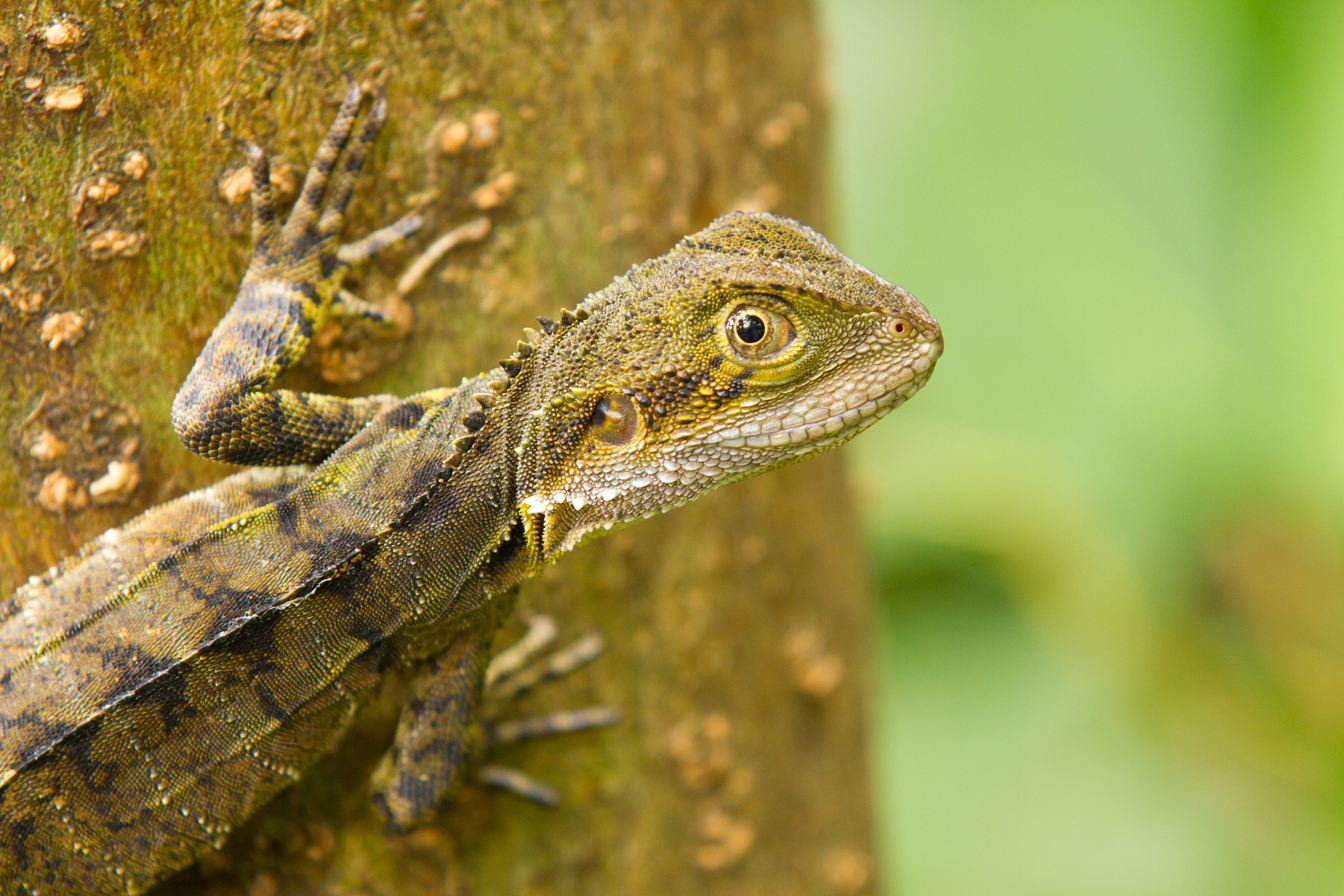
Juvenile Eastern water dragon in the park.

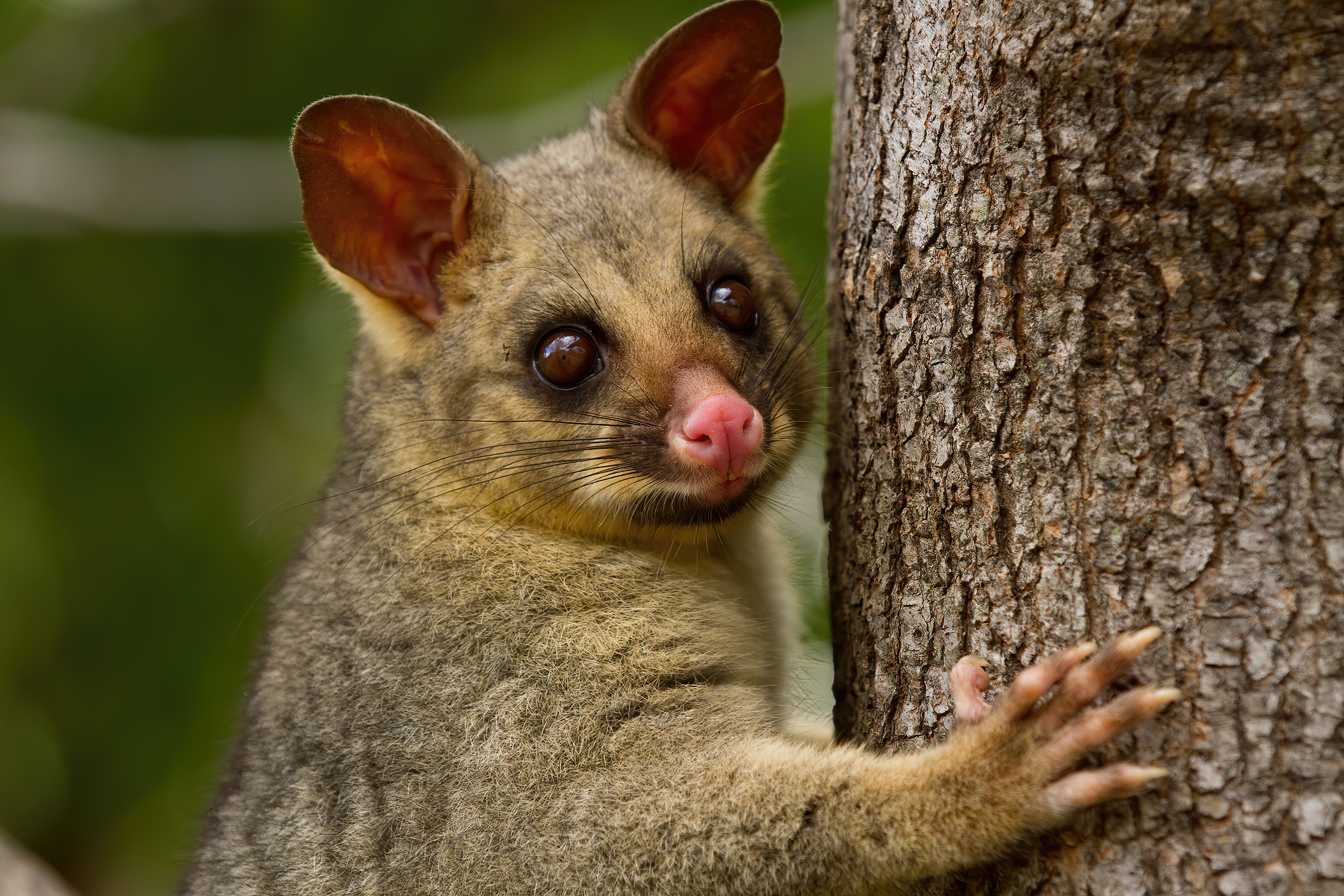
Common brushtail possum in the park.

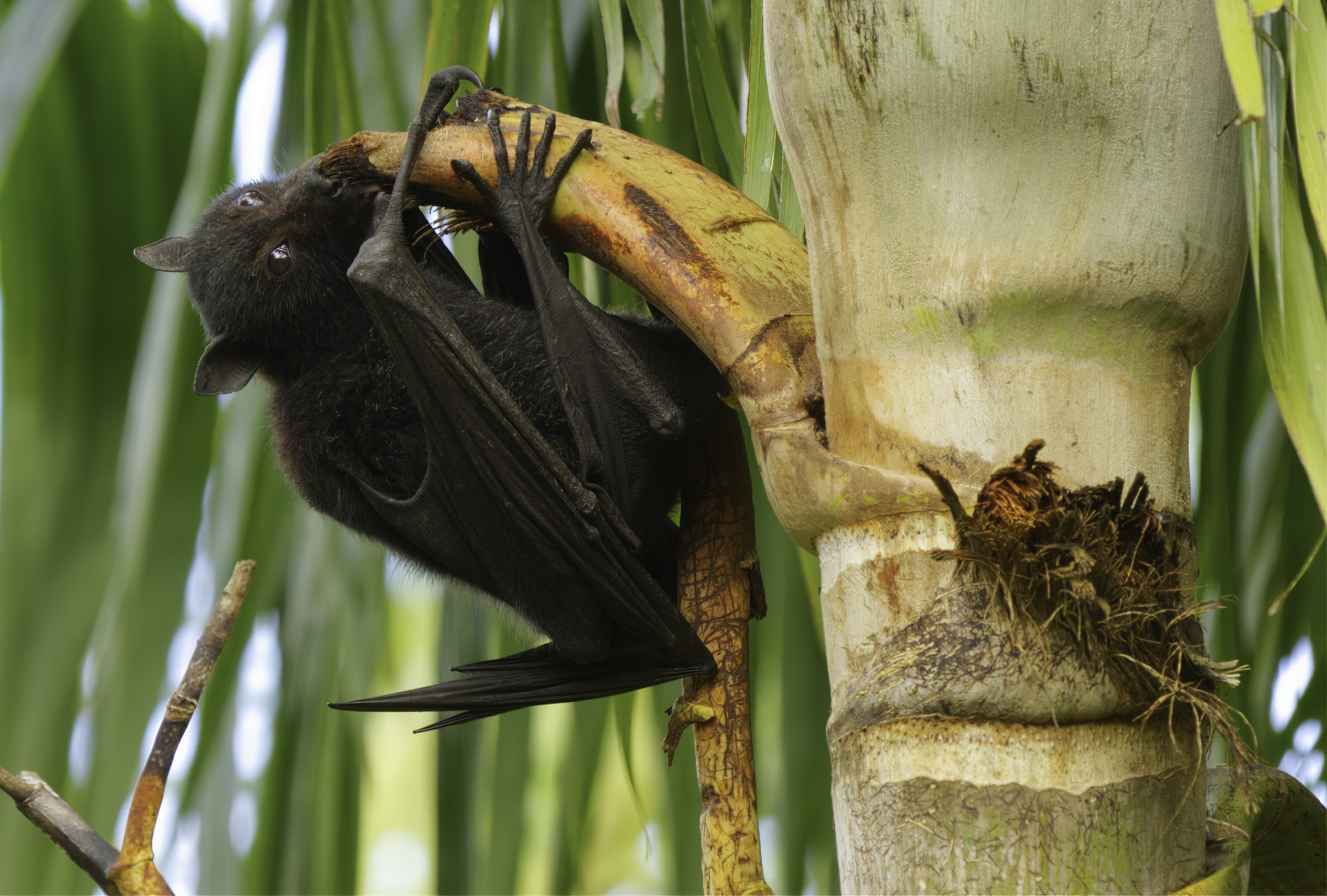
Black flying fox – Pteropus alecto – feeding on a palm tree in the parklands.

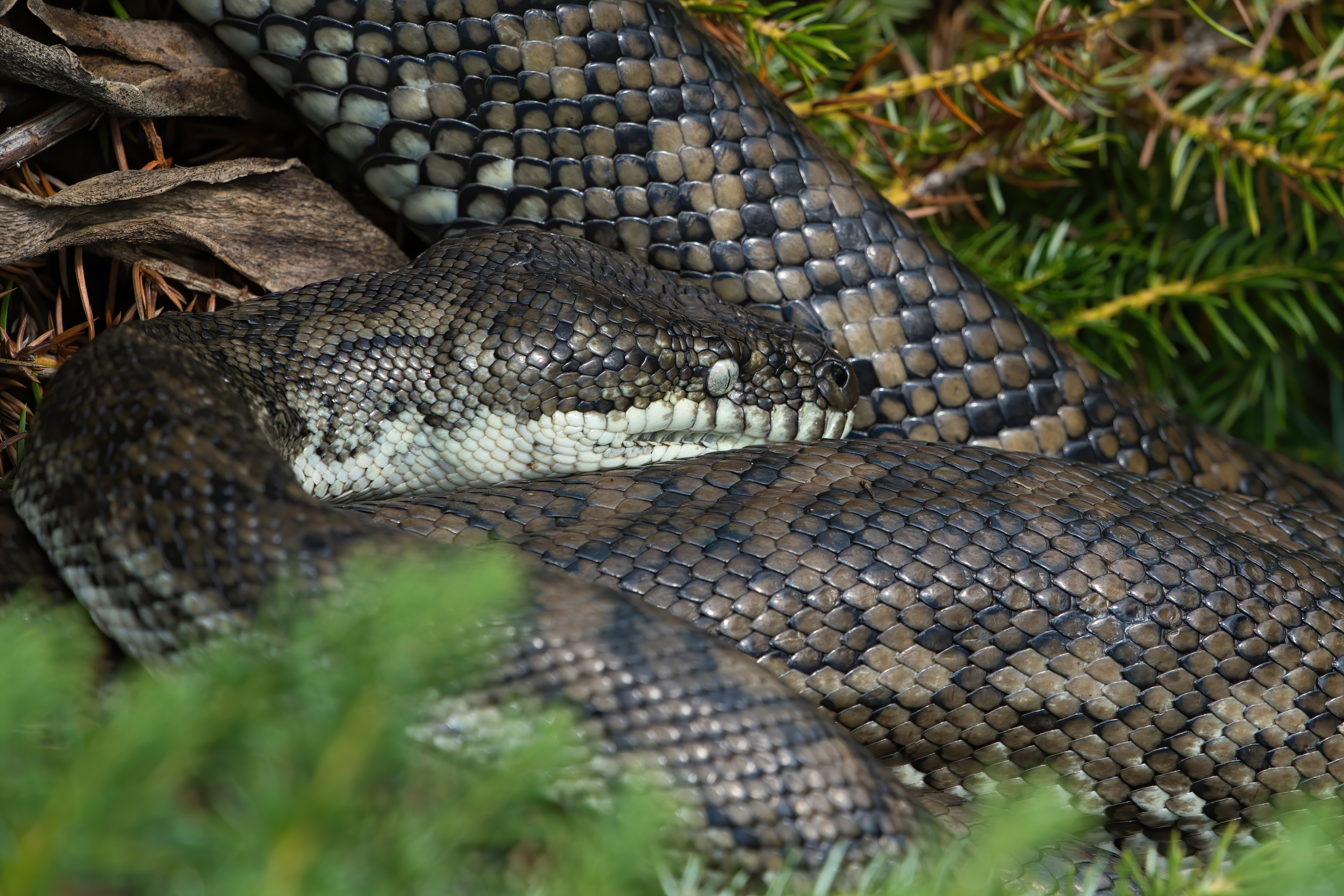
Cuddles the Carpet Python local resident in the Spectacle Garden.

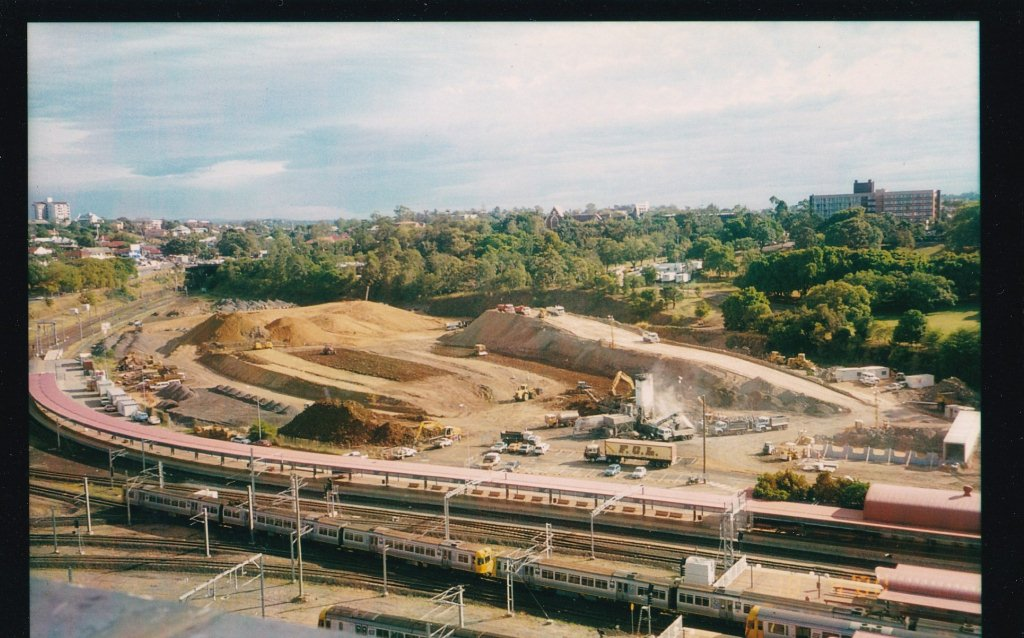
Roma Street Parklands in c. 2000 before construction began

== See also ==
- Parks and gardens of Brisbane
