= Earnest C. Brooks Correctional Facility =

Prison in Michigan, United States

Earnest C. Brooks Correctional Facility (LRF)
- Interactive map of Earnest C. Brooks Correctional Facility (LRF)
- Location: Muskegon, Michigan; 43.208836°N 86.172096°W
- Status: Open
- Security class: Levels I, II, and IV
- Capacity: 1,246
- Opened: 1989
- Managed by: Michigan Department of Corrections
- Warden: Christopher King
- Website: Official website

Earnest C. Brooks Correctional Facility (LRF) is a Michigan prison, located in Muskegon, for adult male prisoners.

== Facility ==
The facility was opened in 1989 and occupies 76 acres (31 ha) in Muskegon. It is one of two facilities for male prisoners in Muskegon. The facility has six housing units used for Michigan Department of Corrections male prisoners 18 years of age and older. One housing unit holds up to 120 Level I prisoners. Three housing units each house up to 240 Level II prisoners. Two housing units each house up to 192 Level IV prisoners. There is also a 22-bed unit for segregating prisoners from the general prison population.

=== Security ===
The facility is surrounded by two fences with razor-ribbon wire. Electronic detection systems and patrol vehicles are also utilized to maintain perimeter security. Two gun towers were added to the perimeter security in 1997.

Housing units are separated by fencing to confine prisoners to their security level. Prisoners from different security levels are only mixed under limited, controlled circumstances.

== Services ==
The facility offers a library, education programs, substance-abuse treatment, impulse control therapy, group counseling, sex offender treatment, and religious services. Onsite medical and dental care is supplemented by local hospitals and the Duane L. Waters Hospital in Jackson, Michigan.

The vocational education program includes food service and electronics - as well as the prison's laundry and notebook bindery facilities.

On February 12, 2011, the prison began participating in the Shakespeare Behind Bars program. The program is intended to provides inmates an opportunity to be involved in a theatrical and creative process.

In May 2015, a new Holy Ground All Faith Chapel was opened at the prison. The privately funded chapel can hold up to 150 prisoners at one time, and is also used for classrooms.

== Notable Inmates ==
Tucker Robert Cipriano - Murdered his adopted father, Robert Cipriano.

== See also ==
- List of Michigan state prisons
