= Tales from Ovid =

1997 poetical work written by the English poet Ted Hughes

First edition (publ. Faber and Faber) Cover art from 14th-century illuminated manuscript of Roman de la Rose

Tales from Ovid is a poetical work written by the English poet Ted Hughes, published in 1997 by Faber and Faber. The book is a retelling of twenty-four tales from Ovid's Metamorphoses. It won the Whitbread Book of the Year Award for 1997 and has been translated into several languages. It was one of his last published works, along with Birthday Letters. Four of the tales had been previously published in 1995, in After Ovid, New Metamorphoses, edited by M. Hofmann and J. Ladun.

A stage adaptation was performed by the Royal Shakespeare Company in the autumn of 1999 at the Swan Theatre, Stratford-upon-Avon. The Queensland Shakespeare Ensemble has also performed dramatisations of excerpts from Hughes' book, between 2006 and 2008.

In 2009, Fiona Shaw performed one of these tales, Echo and Narcissus, in the context of a Prologue to Henry Purcell's opera Dido and Aeneas, with Les Arts Florissants, directed by French conductor and harpsichordist William Christie.

Professor James Shapiro, writing for the New York Times, said of the book: "Hughes makes clear his admiration for the gift that Shakespeare shares with Ovid: insight into what a passion feels like to one possessed by it. Not just ordinary passion either, but human passion in extremis -- passion where it combusts, or levitates, or mutates into an experience of the supernatural. Hughes, too, is blessed with this gift, and this book brilliantly succeeds at bringing Ovid's passionate and disturbing stories to life."
