= Queensland Shakespeare Ensemble =

The Queensland Shakespeare Ensemble logo

The Queensland Shakespeare Ensemble (QSE) is an Australian theatre company. It is based in Brisbane, Queensland, Australia, and is the resident theatre company of the University of Queensland.

== Artistic directors ==
- Rob Pensalfini (2001- )
- Suzanne Little (2001–2005)

== Management ==
- General Manager, Rebecca Murphy (2017 - )
- General Manager, Paul Adam (2014 - 2017)
- General Manager, Anne Pensalfini (2004 - 2006)

== Key productions ==
- As You Like It, directed by Rob Pensalfini (2002)
- Pericles, directed by Ira Seidenstein (2003)
- Coriolanus, directed by Anne Pensalfini (2003)
- The Comedy of Errors, directed by Rob Pensalfini (2005)
- The Madness of King Lear, an experimental re-working of King Lear, directed by Stephen Daniels (2005)
- Shakespeare's Briefs, or Let's Kill All The Lawyers, featuring scenes from Shakespeare's plays which involve legal matters (such as Hermione's trial in The Winter's Tale), directed by Samid Suliman (2006)
- Metamorphoses, an adaptation of Tales from Ovid, directed by Leah Mercer and Jo Loth (2006–2008)
- Much Ado About Nothing, directed by Jo Loth (2007)
- Twelfth Night, directed by Rob Pensalfini (2008)
- As You Like It, directed by Paul Adams (2009)
- Where the Wild Things Are, directed by Rob Pensalfini (2009)
- Richard III, directed by Tom McSweeney (2010)
- The Merchant of Venice, directed by Crystal Arons and Curt Tofteland (2011)
- Two Gentlemen of Verona, directed by Rob Pensalfini (2012)
- The Bombitty of Errors, directed by Zac Kelty (2014) By Jordan Allen-Dutton, Jason Catalano, GQ and Erik Weiner
- The Tempest, directed by Zoe Tuffin (2014)
- Voices Inside/ Out, directed by Curt Tofteland (2015) A slate of six prisoner-authored plays
- Titus, directed by Zoe Tuffin (2015)
- Twelfth Night, directed by Rob Pensalfini (2016)
- The Winter's Tale, directed by Michelle Miall (2017)
- Bogga, directed by Rebecca Murphy (2017) By Rob Pensalfini
- Hamlet, directed by Rob Pensalfini (2018)
- Rosencrantz & Guildenstern Are Dead, directed by Rebecca Murphy (2018)
- Henry IV Part I, directed by Rebecca Murphy (2019)
- Macbeth In The Dark (Radio Play), directed by Kate Foy (2020)
- Romeo & Juliet, directed by Rob Pensalfini (2021)

== Other performances and readings ==
- Staged reading: King John, directed by Rob Pensalfini (2001)
- Staged reading: As You Like It, directed by Rob Pensalfini (2001)
- Staged reading: A Winter's Tale, directed by Flloyd Kennedy (2003)
- Staged reading: Two Gentlemen of Verona, directed by Samid Suliman and Rob Pensalfini (2004)
- Staged reading: The Tragedy of Socrates: a new play in creative development by Silvan Rus, directed by Shane Pike (2019)
- The Blood Votes: a new play by Michael Futcher, directed by Rob Pensalfini (2018). Produced in partnership with Queensland University
- Shakespeare's Shorts, half-hour versions of Shakespeare's best-known plays, designed to tour to festivals, community and corporate events, schools, and other venues (2005–present). Offerings vary from year to year, but have included The Half-Hour Hamlet, Instant Romeo & Juliet, Midsummer's Mechanicals and Express Macbeth
- [Vis-à-Vis: Moving Stories] with the Queensland Ballet (2010)

== Training programs and workshops ==
QSE's training draws heavily on the work of Kristin Linklater, Shakespeare & Company (USA), and Augusto Boal's Theatre of the Oppressed, as well as incorporating yoga, mindfulness, the Alexander Technique and Feldenkrais.

QSE offers regular training to the public in the Linklater voice method, Speaking Shakespeare in Your Own Voice (personalising and acting Shakespeare), and Theatre of the Oppressed. QSE's Artistic Director Rob Pensalfini is a Designated Linklater voice teacher and a faculty member at Shakespeare & Company.

== QSE's Prison Project ==
The Prison Project, started in 2006 under the name Arts in Community Enhancement is Australia's first and only Prison Shakespeare project, and Australia's only ongoing prison theatre program. It ran in Borallon Correctional Centre in 2006, 2009, 2010, and 2011. Borallon Correctional Centre is now closed, and the program is expected to move to the South-East Queensland Correctional Complex in 2012 or 2013.

The Prison Project utilises a combination of Theatre of the Oppressed and Shakespeare performance to engage a group of volunteer prisoners with dramatic form. The project, typically of three months duration, culminates in a performance of Shakespeare's work in the prison for an invited audience of family members, prisoners, correctional staff, and other community members.

The Prison Project's main objective is different from many of its therapeutic counterparts in Prison Theatre and/or Dramatherapy, which have rehabilitation as a direct goal (see for example the work of Geese Theatre). The most basic aim of QSE's Prison Project is to put on a play. In rehearsing a play for performance the rehabilitative side-effects become manifest: the project develops emotional bravery and self-awareness, social skills and self-confidence, individual dedication as well as the commitment to work as a member of a team.

QSE's Prison Project shares many similarities with Prison Shakespeare projects in the United States, the best known of which is Shakespeare Behind Bars, though it was not directly based on any of them. In 2011, the founder of Shakespeare Behind Bars, Curt Tofteland, visited QSE on a Fulbright Fellowship and traded skills with the facilitators of the Prison Project (as well as co-directing QSE's production of The Merchant of Venice.
