= Moreton Bay Tramway Company =

The Moreton Bay Tramroad Company was a private enterprise attempt to establish railways in the new colony of Queensland. It was stillborn.

== People ==
- Coote,
- Stephens,
- Buckley.
- Abraham Fitzgibbon engineer, who was assistant to William Doyne on the Dun Mountain Tramway in Nelson, New Zealand.

== Land Grant Railway ==
It had been proposed to fund it as a Land Grant Railway.

== Horse power ==
The tramway was intended to be operated by horses.

== Characteristics ==
=== Gradients ===
Original proposed MBT company gradient was 1 in 25 (4.0%). The original gauge was 1435mm with horse drawn motive power.

The later railway along the route of the tramway has ruling gradients of 1 in 50. This might be rather steep for horse operation, unless unloaded in uphill direction.

=== Rails ===
The line was originally to use 35 pounds per yard (17 kg/m) rail.

== Nomenclature ==
The Tramway company is sometimes called a Tramroad.

== Timeline ==
=== 1859 ===
- Queensland separated from New South Wales on 6 June 1859. Some very preliminary railway plans had been prepared by the New South Wales Government which were handed over to the new Queensland Government.

=== 1860 ===
- April – An early mention in a political platform of the need for railways or tramways in Queensland.
- April – An early mention of the constructing firm of Moreton, Peto and Brassey.
- November – An advertisement for the company's prospectus in a Sydney newspaper.
- November – An advertisement for the company's prospectus in a Brisbane paper.

=== 1862 ===
- April – coal deposits reported next to the proposed route.
- 29 May – Tramway assets taken over by Government.

=== 1863 ===
- Insolvent Court
- 9 May – the Government Railways Bill repeals the Tramway Act, except for court actions already in action.
- 20 August – Railway Bill in parliament

=== 1865 ===
- 29 March 1865 – three large shareholder taken to Supreme Court for not paying calls on contributing shares.

The three are:

- Coote,
- Stephens,
- Buckley.
