= Shakespeare Behind Bars =

Shakespeare Behind Bars is an organization offering theatrical encounters with personal and social issues to incarcerated and post-incarcerated adults and juveniles. It intends to encourage the development of life skills that will ensure their successful reintegration into society.

The organization's vision statement is that "Shakespeare Behind Bars was founded on the belief that all human beings are born inherently good. Although some convicted criminals have committed heinous crimes against other human beings, the inherent goodness still lives deep within them and can be called forth by immersing participants in the safety of a circle-of-trust and the creative process."

== Facilities ==
=== Luther Luckett Correctional Complex ===
Located in La Grange, Kentucky, the Luther Luckett Correctional Complex was first opened in 1981 and the population is around 1,000. This was the first program of the SBB organization.

Shakespeare Behind Bars has performed Pericles, Prince of Tyre here.

=== Earnest C. Brooks Correctional Facility ===
Located in Muskegon Heights, Michigan, the Earnest C. Brooks Correctional Facility was first opened in 1989. Their SBB program was started in 2011 and is co-facilitated by Kate Thomeson, Joseph Byrd, Edward Hartline, and Bridget McCarthy.

=== JourneyMen Program ===
In addition to the two main facilities of Shakespeare Behind Bars, the program has expanded in an attempt to reach a more specific audience. The JourneyMen Program, which operates in both Kentucky and Michigan, targets inmates between the ages of 18 and 21, and uses the idea of mentorship to continue to cultivate the SBB tradition. The program is co-run by Curt L. Tofteland and Matt Wallace in both states. Its productions are usually done before the full Shakespeare Behind Bars performance to showcase the other work of the programs. Their locations include:

- Luther Luckett Correctional Complex – La Grange, Kentucky
- Eastern Kentucky Correctional Complex – West Liberty, Kentucky
- Green River Correctional Complex – Central City, Kentucky
- Earnest C. Brooks Correctional Facility – Muskegon Heights, Michigan

== Foundation ==
From 1995 to 2008, Tofteland facilitated the SBB/KY program at the Luther Luckett Correctional Complex in LaGrange, Kentucky. He produced and directed 14 Shakespeare productions during his 13-year tenure. Several participants in the SBB/KY program have garnered multiple Pen Literary Prison Writing Awards. Tofteland has described himself as "an artist who uses Shakespeare plays to attempt to fix inmates" and his basis for the anticipated success rate was dependent on the inmates' feelings of being in prison. Shakespeare Behind Bars uses theatre to give inmates a larger voice and to provide them with the feeling of brotherhood while serving their time in the compound.

== Growth and success ==
Within 10 years, Tofteland changed the lives of all inmates involved while producing and directing 10 seasons of Shakespeare Behind bars, expanding the program to new correctional facilities, including the Department of Juvenile Justice. To draw the attention of the public eye, Shakespeare Behind Bars: The Documentary was filmed and it was selected for a world premiere at the 2005 Sundance Film Festival in Park City, Utah.

== Effects ==
Tofteland's goal for the program is to create a family environment with the inmates involved in the play, providing them with education through the plays and giving them something to look forward to at a time when they have no one else. In many cases the inmates have been deserted by their families; Tofteland's compassion is a crucial contribution to the inmates' success both during the play's rehearsals and during the process of rejoining society. Any anger expressed by the inmates at any point is redirected into solving the argument that has occurred instead of pointing fingers and placing blame.

Tofteland claims an average 5% recidivism rate among Shakespeare Behind Bars participants, compared to a national average of 70%. He describes it as "an epiphany for the inmates when they connect again through their characters."
