= Francis Curnow =

Australian railway commissioner

Francis Curnow (died 24 April 1901) was the third commissioner of the Queensland Railway Department in Australia.

== Railway career ==
By 1866 Curnow had settled in Ipswich, Queensland, as a railway storekeeper, a position made necessary by the opening of the Ipswich-Grandchester railway line. He was promoted in January 1877 to the position of Chief Clerk in the Railway Commissioner's Office, a position second only to that of the Commissioner. The offices for the staff of the Secretary for Railways in Queensland were established on the grounds of the original Brisbane Terminal Station at Roma Street, possibly in the early Brisbane Grammar School, resumed for railway purposes.

In January 1884 Curnow was promoted to be the position of Acting Commissioner for Railways and on 12 March 1885 was again promoted to the position of Commissioner for Railways. Curnow was the third person to hold this position, superseding Arthur Orpen Herbert who became the Under Secretary for Railways.

During the time of Curnow's employment as Commissioner of Railways, the Railways Act (1888) was introduced to create a Board of three Commissioners to oversee decision making in the railways, in a bid to reduce political influence. The appointment of the Board of Commissioners on 29 July 1889 prompted Francis Curnow to retire from the railways with a pension of £500. He was soon after appointed Chairman of the Metropolitan Transit Commission, a position he held until shortly before his death.

== Personal life ==
Curnow arrived in Queensland in March 1860 from Cornwall in Britain.

In 1877 Curnow built a house Hellesvere for his home in Brisbane, close to his place of work. Hellesvere was a timber cottage with a steeply pitched corrugated iron roof containing an attic with dormer windows on the northern and southern sides.

Curnow died on 24 April 1901 from heart failure caused by typhoid fever at his home Hellesvere. He was buried at Toowong Cemetery.

== Legacy ==
His home Hellesvere in Brisbane was listed on the Queensland Heritage Register on 21 October 1992, partly for its rarity as a home of that era and partly for its association with Curnow.
