= Arthur Orpen Herbert =

Second commissioner of Queensland Rail in Australia (1831–1890)

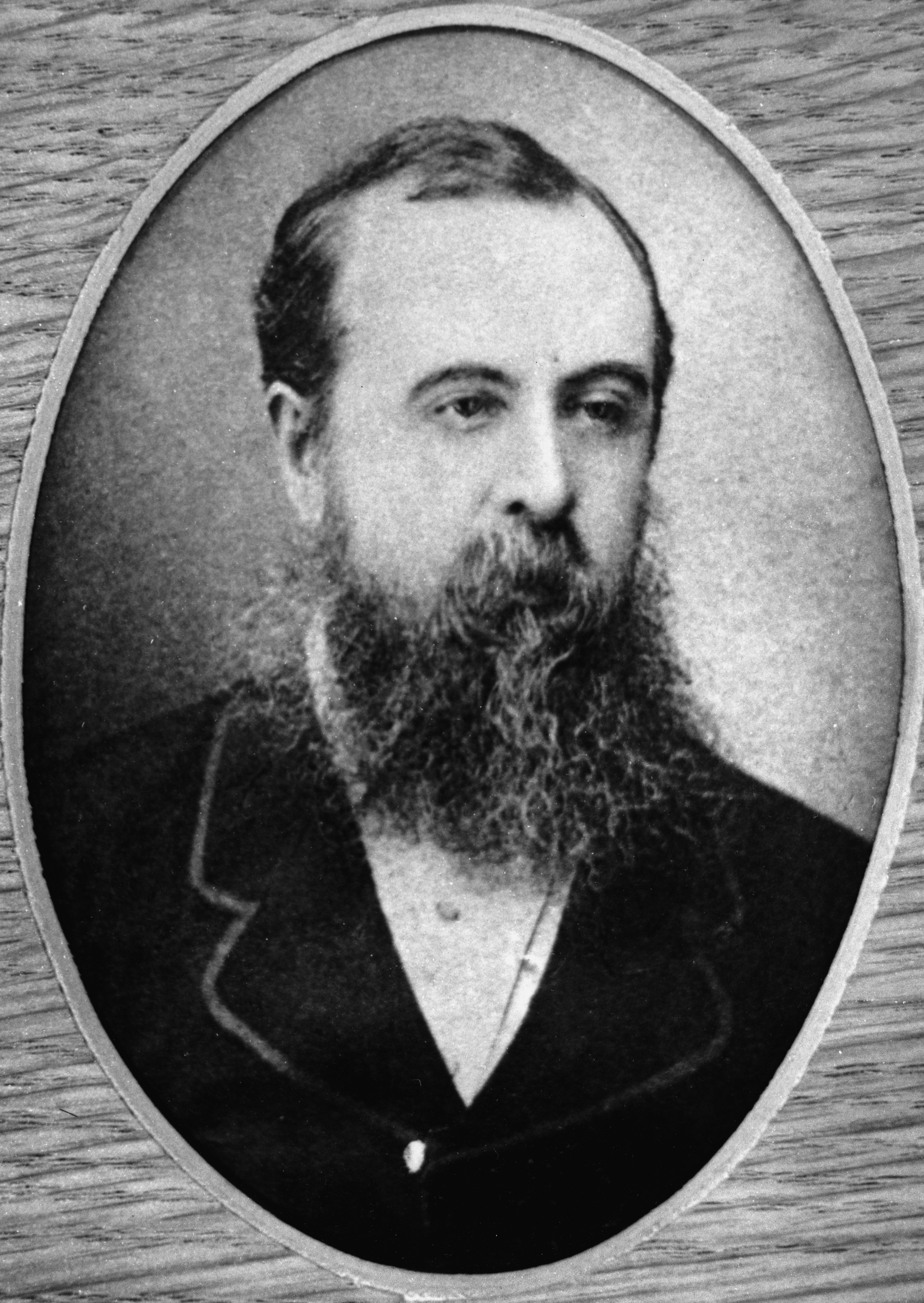
- Born: May 1831; Glanmire, County Cork, Ireland
- Died: 29 October 1890 (aged 59)
- Citizenship: Ireland
- Education: Bandon College; Trinity College
- Occupations: Public servant; clerk; railway commissioner
- Years active: 1859–1885
- Known for: Second Commissioner of Queensland Rail
- Title: Under Secretary for Lands and Works; Commissioner of Railways; Under Secretary for Railways
- Spouse: Agnes Anne Moriarty (m. 1864)
- Children: 3
- Father: Massey H. Herbert

Arthur Orpen Herbert (May 1831 – 29 October 1890) was a public servant in Queensland, Australia. He was the second commissioner of Queensland Rail.

== Early life ==
Arthur Orpen Herbert was born at Glanmire, County Cork, Ireland, on 26 May 1831, the only son of Captain Massey Hutchinson Herbert, of the Royal Navy and his wife Elizabeth (née Orpen). He was educated at Bandon College in County Cork and at Trinity College in Dublin. He immigrated to New South Wales in 1853.

On 11 May 1864, he married Agnes Anne Moriarty in the Holy Trinity Church, Sydney.

== Career ==
Herbert was appointed on 19 April 1853 as a clerk first class ordinary division in the Surveyor-General's Department of New South Wales. At the separation of Queensland in December 1859, he was selected by the Surveyor-General to bring to newly established Colony of Queensland the records and papers relating to the pastoral occupation and leasing and sale of Crown lands. On arrival in Brisbane, he was appointed chief clerk in the Surveyor-General's Office in February 1860. He was appointed secretary to the Lands Board in August 1860.

In April 1862 he became Under Secretary for Lands and Works, to which was added on 28 October 1864 the position of Commissioner of Railways. After the separation of the Lands Department from the Works Department, he became the Under Secretary for Lands in addition to his railway duties. On 29 April 1869, the Secretary for Public Works and Mines Arthur Macalister was briefly appointed Commissioner for Railways, before Herbert was restored to the position on 15 July 1870 by the new Secretary for Public Works William Henry Walsh.

In January 1877, the responsibilities connected with Queensland's rapidly growing railway system made it imperative to relieve him of the duties connected with the general works of the colony in order to focus on the railways. He continued as Commissioner for Railways until 12 March 1885, when he was appointed Under Secretary for Railways, with the Commissionership transferring to Francis Curnow.

He was known as a dedicated public servant.

== Later life ==
Herbert retired upon his pension at the end of 1885 and lived quietly at his residence in Milton.

Herbert died suddenly at his home on 29 October 1890. He was survived by his wife, a son and two daughters.

== Published works ==
- Queensland Railways; Herbert, A.O. (1879), Report upon the general working of the Railway Department during the year ending 31st December, 1878, Government Printer
