= List of people executed in the United States in 1931 =

One hundred and fifty-five people, one hundred and fifty-four male and one female, were executed in the United States in 1931, one hundred and twenty-one by electrocution, thirty-three by hanging, and one by gas chamber.

Alexander Williams became the youngest person to be executed in Pennsylvania in the 20th century. His conviction was posthumously overturned in 2023.

== List of people executed in the United States in 1931 ==
No.	Date of execution	Name	Age of person			Gender	Ethnicity	State	Method	Ref.
No.	Date of execution	Name	At execution	At offense	Age difference	Gender	Ethnicity	State	Method	Ref.
1	January 16, 1931	Edgar Jenkins	22	22	0	Male	Black	Georgia	Electrocution	
2	January 16, 1931	Philip Hays	25	Unknown	Unknown	Male	Black	Mississippi	Hanging	
3	January 23, 1931	Sidney M. Gattis	49	Unknown	Unknown	Male	Black	North Carolina	Electrocution	
4	January 27, 1931	Clayton Bell	26	26	0	Male	Black	Florida	Electrocution	
5	January 27, 1931	William Biggers	35	34	1	Male	Black	Georgia	Electrocution	
6	January 27, 1931	Theodore James Harris	23	22	1	Male	Black	Tennessee	Electrocution	
7	January 30, 1931	Andrew G. Halliday	22	21	1	Male	White	Colorado	Hanging	
8	January 30, 1931	Claude Ray	25	24	1	Male	White	Colorado	Hanging	
9	January 30, 1931	John Walker	42	41	1	Male	White	Colorado	Hanging	
10	January 30, 1931	Earl Sites	28	27	1	Male	White	Ohio	Electrocution	
11	January 30, 1931	Fred J. Massa	27	26	1	Male	White	Ohio	Electrocution	
12	January 30, 1931	Kenneth Ray McCartney	25	25	0	Male	White	Ohio	Electrocution	
13	February 3, 1931	Ollie Dorson	40	40	0	Male	Black	Virginia	Electrocution	
14	February 12, 1931	T. Southworth	26	24	2	Male	White	Florida	Electrocution	
15	February 13, 1931	Thomas Henry Bardon	Unknown	Unknown	Unknown	Male	Black	North Carolina	Electrocution	
16	February 13, 1931	Dave McRae	31	29	2	Male	Black	North Carolina	Electrocution	
17	February 20, 1931	William Claude Adams	40	40	0	Male	White	West Virginia	Hanging	
18	February 20, 1931	Emory Stephens	24	24	0	Male	White	West Virginia	Hanging	
19	February 23, 1931	Irene Vera Schroeder	22	20	2	Female	White	Pennsylvania	Electrocution	
20	February 23, 1931	Walter Glenn Dague	35	34	1	Male	White	Pennsylvania	Electrocution	
21	February 24, 1931	Nathan Burton	24	22	2	Male	White	Florida	Electrocution	
22	February 26, 1931	Anthony Luciano	36	35	1	Male	White	New York	Electrocution	
23	February 26, 1931	Anthony Vellucia	40	39	1	Male	White	New York	Electrocution	
24	February 27, 1931	Cleveland Malone	25	25	0	Male	Black	Alabama	Electrocution	
25	February 27, 1931	John Cantrell Arkwright	26	26	0	Male	Black	South Carolina	Electrocution	
26	February 27, 1931	George John Bird	21	21	0	Male	Black	South Carolina	Electrocution	
27	February 27, 1931	Tillman Boozer	32	31	1	Male	Black	South Carolina	Electrocution	
28	February 27, 1931	Robert Eldridge	26	26	0	Male	Black	South Carolina	Electrocution	
29	February 27, 1931	James Hickman	26	26	0	Male	Black	South Carolina	Electrocution	
30	February 27, 1931	Earnest Thomas	23	23	0	Male	Black	South Carolina	Electrocution	
31	March 2, 1931	Thomas F. Martin	26	24	2	Male	White	Pennsylvania	Electrocution	
32	March 6, 1931	Cardoza Bell	24	22	2	Male	Black	District of Columbia	Electrocution	
33	March 13, 1931	Henry West	21	21	0	Male	Black	Georgia	Electrocution	
34	March 27, 1931	Moses Daniels Jr.	20	19	1	Male	Black	Alabama	Electrocution	
35	March 27, 1931	Lewis B. Newsome	21	Unknown	Unknown	Male	Black	Georgia	Electrocution	
36	April 7, 1931	Arthur Hamilton	41	40	1	Male	White	Ohio	Electrocution	
37	April 10, 1931	Daniel Grosso	32	27	5	Male	White	New Jersey	Electrocution	
38	April 17, 1931	Willie Lee Cox	26	25	1	Male	Black	Georgia	Electrocution	
39	April 17, 1931	Gilbert Glaze	29	29	0	Male	Black	Georgia	Electrocution	
40	April 17, 1931	Edward Spoeding Hembree	32	31	1	Male	Native American	Oklahoma	Electrocution	
41	April 20, 1931	William Watkins	25	25	0	Male	Black	Pennsylvania	Electrocution	
42	April 24, 1931	Gideon Moncus Twitty	32	31	1	Male	White	Texas	Electrocution	
43	April 29, 1931	Marvin Berry	40	38	2	Male	Black	Georgia	Electrocution	
44	April 30, 1931	Charles King	39	38	1	Male	White	Ohio	Electrocution	
45	May 8, 1931	Cleveland Nelson	18	17	1	Male	Black	Mississippi	Hanging	
46	May 18, 1931	Fred Griffin	18	18	0	Male	Black	Georgia	Electrocution	
47	May 21, 1931	John Williams	39	39	0	Male	Black	Ohio	Electrocution	
48	May 22, 1931	James Burley Adams	34	30	4	Male	White	Georgia	Electrocution	
49	May 22, 1931	Willie Green	27	26	1	Male	Black	Georgia	Electrocution	
50	May 25, 1931	James Romeo	30	29	1	Male	White	Ohio	Electrocution	
51	May 25, 1931	Sigismund Szachewicz	25	24	1	Male	White	Pennsylvania	Electrocution	
52	May 25, 1931	John T. Nafus	41	40	1	Male	White	Pennsylvania	Electrocution	
53	May 26, 1931	Norman Blakely	17	16	1	Male	Black	South Carolina	Electrocution	
54	May 27, 1931	Robert W. McQuagge	27	26	1	Male	White	Florida	Electrocution	
55	May 29, 1931	Spencer Bates	26	25	1	Male	Black	Alabama	Electrocution	
56	June 8, 1931	Alexander McClay Williams	16	16	0	Male	Black	Pennsylvania	Electrocution	
57	June 12, 1931	Arthur Meyers	31	24	7	Male	Black	Georgia	Hanging	
58	June 12, 1931	Lorenzo Price	32	30	2	Male	Black	Maryland	Hanging	
59	June 12, 1931	J.P. Moore	20	Unknown	Unknown	Male	Black	South Carolina	Electrocution	
60	June 18, 1931	John Graham	Unknown	Unknown	0	Male	Black	Florida	Electrocution	
61	June 19, 1931	Ofilio Herrera	36	34	2	Male	Hispanic	Texas	Electrocution	
62	June 19, 1931	Frank Myer	Unknown	Unknown	Unknown	Male	White	West Virginia	Hanging	
63	June 22, 1931	Cleo Peterson	23	22	1	Male	Black	Pennsylvania	Electrocution	
64	June 22, 1931	Clarence Williams	20	20	0	Male	Black	Pennsylvania	Electrocution	
65	June 24, 1931	Henry Johnson	Unknown	Unknown	0	Male	Black	Florida	Electrocution	
66	June 24, 1931	Ignacio Saragoza	26	26	0	Male	Hispanic	Indiana	Electrocution	
67	June 25, 1931	Fred Innes	38	37	1	Male	Black	New York	Electrocution	
68	June 25, 1931	Haywood Turner	29	28	1	Male	Black	New York	Electrocution	
69	June 26, 1931	Calvin Groome	18	Unknown	Unknown	Male	Black	Virginia	Electrocution	
70	June 29, 1931	Peter Spirellis	38	38	0	Male	White	Pennsylvania	Electrocution	
71	July 2, 1931	Fred Carmosino	19	18	1	Male	White	New York	Electrocution	
72	July 2, 1931	Nicholas Leonelli	23	22	1	Male	White	New York	Electrocution	
73	July 2, 1931	Ferdinand Mangiamele	25	24	1	Male	White	New York	Electrocution	
74	July 10, 1931	William Stokes	Unknown	Unknown	0	Male	Black	Alabama	Electrocution	
75	July 10, 1931	Felix Duhart	36	30	6	Male	Black	Louisiana	Hanging	
76	July 10, 1931	Ike Tellis	32	Unknown	Unknown	Male	Black	Louisiana	Hanging	
77	July 10, 1931	Paul Dewey Cole	33	32	1	Male	White	Oklahoma	Electrocution	
78	July 10, 1931	Albert Clarence Floyd	38	37	1	Male	White	South Carolina	Electrocution	
79	July 14, 1931	Joseph Rusnak	25	24	1	Male	White	New Jersey	Electrocution	
80	July 17, 1931	Fred Mott	36	35	1	Male	White	California	Hanging	
81	July 17, 1931	Charles H. Simpson	18	18	0	Male	White	California	Hanging	
82	July 17, 1931	Eugene Luke Dudley	21	Unknown	Unknown	Male	Black	Georgia	Electrocution	
83	July 17, 1931	Emmett Shaw	40	40	0	Male	Black	Mississippi	Hanging	
84	July 17, 1931	Sam Green Whittaker	18	18	0	Male	Black	Mississippi	Hanging	
85	July 20, 1931	Bonaventura Nardella	44	43	1	Male	White	New Jersey	Electrocution	
86	July 23, 1931	Herbert Johnson	19	18	1	Male	Black	New York	Electrocution	
87	July 23, 1931	Andrew P. Metelski	21	20	1	Male	White	New York	Electrocution	
88	July 24, 1931	Edward H. LaVerne	25	24	1	Male	White	California	Hanging	
89	July 24, 1931	Wilbur McCabe	40	39	1	Male	White	California	Hanging	
90	July 24, 1931	Joshua Riles	28	27	1	Male	Black	Texas	Electrocution	
91	July 27, 1931	Vincent Pablo Leonar	39	38	1	Male	Asian	New Jersey	Electrocution	
92	July 28, 1931	Will Jenkins	46	Unknown	Unknown	Male	Black	Texas	Electrocution	
93	July 31, 1931	James Lawson	26	Unknown	Unknown	Male	Black	Arkansas	Electrocution	
94	July 31, 1931	Benjamin F. Brown	27	26	1	Male	White	California	Hanging	
95	July 31, 1931	Bennie White	29	Unknown	Unknown	Male	Black	Louisiana	Hanging	
96	August 10, 1931	Wilson Autry	19	19	0	Male	Black	North Carolina	Electrocution	
97	August 14, 1931	Joe Jefferson Shield	35	34	1	Male	White	Texas	Electrocution	
98	August 17, 1931	Joseph Parsi	31	28	3	Male	White	Pennsylvania	Electrocution	
99	August 17, 1931	Frank Powell	26	23	3	Male	White	Pennsylvania	Electrocution	
100	August 17, 1931	Frank Candeloro Cantela	37	34	3	Male	White	Pennsylvania	Electrocution	
101	August 17, 1931	Carmelo "Carl" Cro	34	31	3	Male	White	Pennsylvania	Electrocution	
102	August 21, 1931	Herman A. Young	28	27	1	Male	White	Arizona	Hanging	
103	August 21, 1931	William M. Harper	42	41	1	Male	White	Louisiana	Hanging	
104	August 21, 1931	Ben Goldston	36	Unknown	Unknown	Male	Black	North Carolina	Electrocution	
105	August 21, 1931	Bennie Nichols	31	30	1	Male	Black	Oklahoma	Electrocution	
106	August 27, 1931	Harry Lipschitz	27	26	1	Male	White	New York	Electrocution	
107	September 4, 1931	Luis Ceja	28	27	1	Male	Hispanic	Nevada	Gas chamber	
108	September 4, 1931	Maurice Seaton	22	Unknown	Unknown	Male	Black	New York	Electrocution	
109	September 11, 1931	Willie Higgins	28	Unknown	Unknown	Male	Black	Georgia	Electrocution	
110	September 15, 1931	Paul Vere Hurley	20	18	2	Male	White	Massachusetts	Electrocution	
111	September 25, 1931	Henry Walter Lovett	39	38	1	Male	White	Oklahoma	Electrocution	
112	September 28, 1931	William C. Snipes	22	21	1	Male	White	Pennsylvania	Electrocution	
113	October 2, 1931	William Hudson	25	24	1	Male	White	California	Hanging	
114	October 2, 1931	Robert Earl O'Neill	21	20	1	Male	White	California	Hanging	
115	October 9, 1931	John E. Preston	33	31	2	Male	White	Illinois	Electrocution	
116	October 16, 1931	Robert Lee Chisholm	20	20	0	Male	Black	Georgia	Electrocution	
117	October 16, 1931	Clark Stevens	24	24	0	Male	Black	Georgia	Electrocution	
118	October 16, 1931	Frank Jordan	30	30	0	Male	White	Illinois	Electrocution	
119	October 16, 1931	Charles Rocco	24	23	1	Male	White	Illinois	Electrocution	
120	October 16, 1931	John Popescue	21	20	1	Male	White	Illinois	Electrocution	
121	October 16, 1931	Richard Sullivan	35	34	1	Male	White	Illinois	Electrocution	
122	October 16, 1931	Henry Hodge	19	19	0	Male	Black	Louisiana	Hanging	
123	October 16, 1931	Haywood Johnson	37	Unknown	Unknown	Male	Black	Louisiana	Hanging	
124	October 16, 1931	Jesse Simmons	20	20	0	Male	Black	Louisiana	Hanging	
125	October 20, 1931	Merle James Johnson	26	26	0	Male	White	Illinois	Electrocution	
126	October 21, 1931	Joseph Belenski	38	37	1	Male	White	Massachusetts	Electrocution	
127	October 30, 1931	Oconee C. Hendrix	34	32	2	Male	Black	Georgia	Electrocution	
128	October 30, 1931	William Searcy	31	31	0	Male	Black	Georgia	Electrocution	
129	October 30, 1931	James E. Kingsley	25	24	1	Male	White	Oregon	Hanging	
130	October 30, 1931	Victor Rodriguez	20	19	1	Male	Hispanic	Texas	Electrocution	
131	October 30, 1931	Nicandro Munoz	26	25	1	Male	Hispanic	Texas	Electrocution	
132	November 6, 1931	Joseph A. R. Altringer	23	22	1	Male	White	Iowa	Hanging	
133	November 12, 1931	Jim Collins	Unknown	Unknown	Unknown	Male	Black	Florida	Electrocution	
134	November 13, 1931	Pedro Canonisado Magsaysay	41	39	2	Male	Asian	California	Hanging	
135	November 13, 1931	Blanton Ralls	19	18	1	Male	Black	Ohio	Electrocution	
136	November 13, 1931	Walter Ralls	30	30	0	Male	Black	Ohio	Electrocution	
137	November 20, 1931	Tilby Lafayette Smith	27	25	2	Male	White	Ohio	Electrocution	
138	November 30, 1931	Harry Starchok	29	28	1	Male	White	Pennsylvania	Electrocution	
139	November 30, 1931	Edward Red Wing	39	38	1	Male	Native American	Texas	Electrocution	
140	December 4, 1931	Clarence L. King	28	26	2	Male	White	California	Hanging	
141	December 10, 1931	Rudolph Duringer	26	25	1	Male	White	New York	Electrocution	
142	December 11, 1931	James Vernable Foster	49	49	0	Male	White	Colorado	Hanging	
143	December 11, 1931	Willie Green	31	30	1	Male	Black	Illinois	Electrocution	
144	December 11, 1931	James Jackson	32	Unknown	Unknown	Male	Black	Illinois	Electrocution	
145	December 11, 1931	Hazel Johnson	23	23	0	Male	Black	Illinois	Electrocution	
146	December 11, 1931	Henry Pannier	57	57	0	Male	White	Illinois	Electrocution	
147	December 11, 1931	J.W. Ballard	17	17	0	Male	Black	North Carolina	Electrocution	
148	December 11, 1931	Bernice Matthews	18	18	0	Male	Black	North Carolina	Electrocution	
149	December 18, 1931	Chevis Herring	24	23	1	Male	Black	North Carolina	Electrocution	
150	December 18, 1931	Willie Loyd Fritts	39	36	3	Male	White	Texas	Electrocution	
151	December 18, 1931	Barney Lee Ross	22	Unknown	Unknown	Male	Black	Texas	Electrocution	
152	December 18, 1931	George Miller	43	41	2	Male	White	Washington	Hanging	
153	December 21, 1931	English Monroe Gaskins	44	43	1	Male	White	Georgia	Electrocution	
154	December 30, 1931	Charles F. Fithian	23	21	2	Male	White	New Jersey	Electrocution	
155	December 30, 1931	Peter Giordano	20	18	2	Male	White	New Jersey	Electrocution	

== Demographics ==
Gender
Male	154	99%
Female	1	1%
Ethnicity
Black	74	48%
White	72	46%
Hispanic	5	3%
Asian	2	1%
Native American	2	1%
State
Georgia	18	12%
Pennsylvania	16	10%
New York	12	8%
Illinois	10	6%
Ohio	10	6%
Texas	10	6%
California	9	6%
South Carolina	9	6%
North Carolina	8	5%
Florida	7	5%
Louisiana	7	5%
New Jersey	6	4%
Alabama	4	3%
Colorado	4	3%
Mississippi	4	3%
Oklahoma	4	3%
West Virginia	3	2%
Massachusetts	2	1%
Virginia	2	1%
Arizona	1	1%
Arkansas	1	1%
District of Columbia	1	1%
Indiana	1	1%
Iowa	1	1%
Maryland	1	1%
Nevada	1	1%
Oregon	1	1%
Tennessee	1	1%
Washington	1	1%
Method
Electrocution	121	78%
Hanging	33	21%
Gas chamber	1	1%
Month
January	12	8%
February	18	12%
March	5	3%
April	9	6%
May	11	7%
June	15	10%
July	25	16%
August	11	7%
September	6	4%
October	19	12%
November	8	5%
December	16	10%
Age
Unknown	6	4%
10–19	14	9%
20–29	75	48%
30–39	42	27%
40–49	17	11%
50–59	1	1%
Total	155	100%

== Executions in recent years ==
Number of executions
1932	147
1931	155
1930	155
Total	457

Preceded by 1930	List of people executed in the United States in 1931	Succeeded by 1932
