= Will Lockett =

American serial killer (1888–1920)

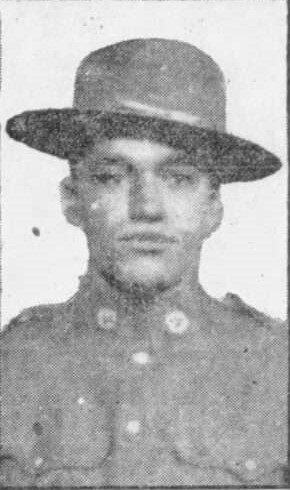
- Born: Petrie Kimbrough; May 1888; Pembroke, Kentucky, U.S.
- Died: March 11, 1920 (aged 31); Kentucky State Penitentiary, Kentucky, U.S.
- Other names: Will Hamilton; Will Hampton
- Status: Executed by electrocution
- Conviction: Murder
- Penalty: Death

Details
- Victims: 4
- Span of crimes: 1912–1920
- Country: United States
- States: Illinois, Indiana, Kentucky

Petrie Kimbrough (May 1888 – March 11, 1920), better known by his alias Will Lockett, was an American serial killer who killed three women and one girl between 1912 and 1920 in three states and tried to kill a woman in his native Kentucky. He was executed for killing 10-year-old Geneva Hardman, whom he killed by crushing her head with a stone. Lockett pleaded guilty to the crime, and admitted to three other murders before his execution.

The case is notable for the fact that the authorities used brute force to prevent white mobs from lynching Lockett, who was black. When a mob tried to storm the courthouse, the Kentucky National Guard and the state police opened fire on them, shooting over 50 people. Six people, including five members of the lynch mob, were killed. The Brooklyn Eagle remarked that the incident was "the first time south of Mason and Dixon's Line that any mob of this sort had actually met the volley fire of soldiers." When the mob returned, now with 10,000 people, they were confronted by over 1,200 U.S. Army soldiers armed with tanks and machine guns, and snipers, who had been requested by the governor. Brigadier General Francis C. Marshall declared martial law, secured the area, forced the mob to leave, enacted citywide censorship, and had military patrols guard various parts of the county, including the black districts.

== Biography ==
Born and reared in Pembroke, Kentucky, Kimbrough began using the alias of "Will Lockett" during his travels.

According to Kimbrough's confession on death row, he tried to rape a white woman in Christian County, Kentucky in 1905. In 1912, he attacked and murdered Clara Miller Rogers, a 25-year-old white woman, at Carmi, Illinois, near train tracks crossing Louisville and Nashville. In 1917, he choked, raped, and beat Eliza Morman, a 25-year-old black woman, at Governor and Canal Streets in Evansville, Indiana, leaving her for dead. He was eventually enlisted to serve in the army at Camp Zachary Taylor in Louisville, Kentucky, where he raped and strangled Sallie Anderson Kraft, a 55-year-old black woman.

=== Murder of Geneva Hardman and riots ===
Geneva Hardman was a 10-year-old white schoolgirl who lived in Lexington, who became Kimbrough's last victim. On February 4, 1920, her school satchel and cap were found near a fence bordering a large cornfield in southern Fayette County by a farmer named Speed Collins. Thinking a student had lost their items, he brought them to the nearby school, where the teacher, Mrs. Anna Young, recognized the items as Hardman's. She sent several older students to check if she was home ill, but her mother alerted them that she had not seen her since the morning.

Collins and local store owner Claude B. Elkin, along with a Thomas Foley, left for the spot where the satchel and cap were found. After taking a closer look, they found the tracks of a large man. Following the trail, they found Geneva's body behind a fodder stock, which had been partly covered. Her body and nearby stalks were covered in blood, with a large rock next to it, and one of her hair ribbons was also found in the mud.

The men then called the sheriff's office and the deputies soon arrived, led by Captain Volney G. Mullikin and his bloodhounds, who followed the large man's tracks leading into the town of Keene, in Jessamine County. It was later determined that although school children and the woman who lived on the road across the field, Bettie McClubbing, had been near the road at the time of the murder, no screams or sounds of a struggle were heard. The authorities' first break came when they met James Woolfolk, who was driving along the south pike and had offered a ride to Will Lockett, a former World War I veteran and known burglar and bootlegger, who supported himself as a day laborer on farms.

Continuing to follow the trails into Nicholasville, police questioned a farmer, Will Hughes, who had seen a black man walking along the pike, covered in mud to his knees. By then, a large search party had formed, which even sighted the fleeing man and gave chase, but he fled. He was eventually captured by Dr. W. T. Collette and Deputy Sheriff W. C. White near Dixontown, after he had tried to fool them that he was "Will Hamilton". They initially left him on the road, but they saw him enter a residence and turned around to investigate. "Hamilton" was interrogated by Assistant Chief Ernest Thompson and Det. Dudley Veal, to whom he confessed to attacking Geneva because he had wanted to rape her, but had to kill her with a rock he found nearby. Shortly after, Lockett was sent to the Kentucky State Penitentiary.

Governor Edwin P. Morrow dispatched the Kentucky National Guard to Lexington to protect Lockett. Morrow told the state adjutant general "Do as much as you have to do to keep that negro in the hands of the law. If he falls into the hands of the mob I do not expect to see you alive."

On February 9, 1920, riots erupted in Lexington, with lynch mobs numbering between 5,000 and 10,000 people trying to storm the courthouse and kill Lockett. However, they were prevented from reaching him when the police and National Guard opened fire, shooting more than 50 people. Rioters William Hiram Ethington, James D. Masengale, John Van Thomas, John M. Rogers, and Major L.M. King, and bystander Benjamin F. Carrier, were killed. The father of William Ethington, James Hiram, later complained that while the troops at the front, mostly teenagers with minimal experience, had fired over the heads of the rioters, the police officers and soldiers shooting from the upper floors of the courthouse had fired directly into the mobs. In a letter to the Lexington Herald-Leader, he complained that the soldiers and police didn't empathize with the mob.

"I can not thank those that shot from the window where the first shot came from. For every time a shot was fired I could see a man fall and they were killing men that did not have anything to protect themselves with and did not wish to hurt anyone but wanted to get that negro who murdered little Geneva Hardman. I think that if those men had taken it home to themselves and could have thought 'If it had been my little daughter that had been mangled up by a brute like that,' they certainly could not have killed the boys as they did."

The mob dispersed after the soldiers started firing machine guns into the air. The actions of the police and the Kentucky National Guard were praised by the NAACP, with W. E. B. Du Bois referring to the shootout as the "Second Battle of Lexington".

Fearful of prosecution, only 21 wounded rioters went to the hospital. A soldier and two policemen were also seriously wounded. After the shooting, outraged members of the mob broke into pawnshops, seeking more weapons. Several pawnbrokers had kept their shops locked all day. Two shops were open; Joe Rosenberg said "forty or fifty" pistols were taken from his shop, and Harry Skuller said he had lost "fifty or sixty" weapons. Boxes of cartridges were picked up along with the pistols. More people, many of whom were armed, arrived in the town.

Amid looting and fears of further violence, Edwin Morrow requested Federal help, and 1,200 Army soldiers led by Brigadier General Francis C. Marshall were brought to Lexington on special trains. They were armed with tanks and machine guns. Marshall declared the county to be under martial law, and forced the mob to leave the area. When some of those in the mob angrily objected to leaving, the soldiers beat them into submission with rifle butts. In a show of force, Marshall did not have Lockett transported discreetly, but instead had him openly marched in the streets under the guard of 400 troops to the train station to return him to the Kentucky State Penitentiary. Martial law was lifted two weeks later.

The day after the shootings, Marshall declared, "This community has set a fine example against lawlessness and Bolshevism and has killed several of its own citizens in upholding law and order."

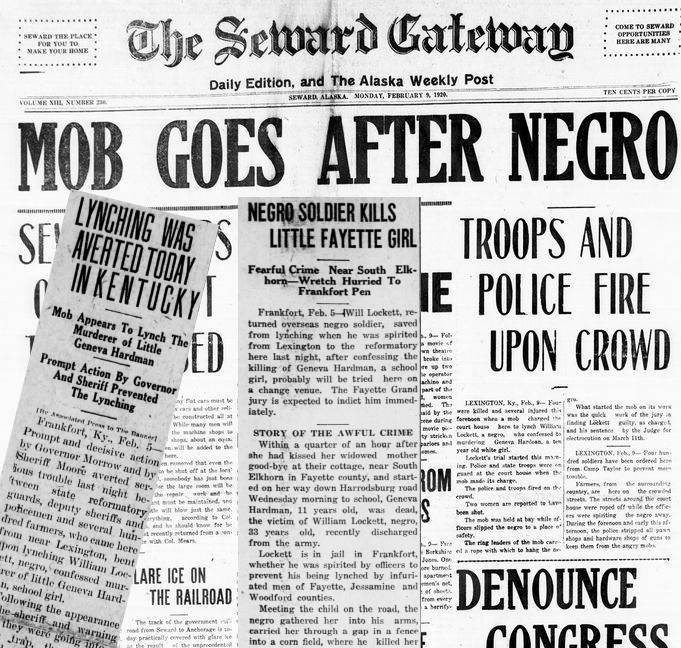
News coverage of Lockett from 1920

== Martial law ==
To prevent more lynchers from organizing, Marshall enacted citywide censorship. He ordered local telephone and telegraph companies to shut down all communication within 100 miles from Lexington and banned any messages from leaving the city. Marshall also organized 12 patrols to guard certain areas of the county. Those areas included the local armory, the home of the judge, the home of the head of the county, and the black districts of Lexington.

Marshall also attempted to have certain members of the crowd indicted for inciting the riot. A report said that most of the crowd were curious bystanders, but "there were undoubtedly among the crowd various men, mostly from other counties than Fayette, intent on lynching Lockett." Marshall handpicked jurors whom he knew would have no trouble convicting the rioters. However, the grand jury was discarded on the grounds that the indictments would be thrown out on constitutional grounds. A second grand jury was convened. It had secured testimony against some individuals guilty of inciting the crowd. However, on February 26, 1920, they concluded that handing down indictments with subsequent trials would "only tend to aggravate an already tense situation, engender more passion and bitter feelings in the County and State, and keep alive such as now exists."

== Trial, sentence and death ==
After confessing to Warden Chilton his true identity and previous crimes, Kimbrough was taken to court, where he pleaded guilty. During his sentencing hearing, Lockett said "I know I do not deserve mercy, but I am sorry I committed the crime and I would give anything if the little girl could be brought back to life." His lawyer pointed to his honorable discharge, which stated that his character was "very good". The jury fixed Lockett's sentence at death, and he was formally sentenced to death by Judge Charles Kerr for murdering Hardman. Authorities at first attempted to confirm the other slayings, but soon lost interest as Kimbrough was going to be executed anyway.

Kimbrough refused to make a statement when he was taken back to his cell, but prison officials claimed that he had prayed loudly and had sung hymns during the night. He stated publicly that he was ready to die, and had prayed for both Geneva Hardman and her family.

On March 11, 1920, the day of his execution, Kimbrough barely showed any emotion as the black cap was lowered onto his face. Shortly thereafter, Collier, the prison executioner, turned on the electric current, which killed the prisoner within 15 seconds without a hitch. The execution was witnessed by Hardman's two brothers, 17 other civilians of Lexington, eight soldiers, and 12 prison guards. Kimbrough's body was buried in the prison cemetery.

== See also ==
- Capital punishment in Kentucky
- List of people executed in Kentucky (pre-1972)
- List of serial killers in the United States

== Bibliography ==
- Michael Newton: The Encyclopedia of Serial Killers, 2000
- John D. Wright Jr.: Lexington's Suppression of the 1920 Will Lockett Lynch Mob, 1986, Vol. 84, No. 3
