= List of people executed in the United States in 1933 =

One hundred and sixty-two people, all male, were executed in the United States in 1933, one hundred and twenty-two by electrocution, thirty-nine by hanging, and one by gas chamber.

== List of people executed in the United States in 1933 ==
No.	Date of execution	Name	Age of person			Gender	Ethnicity	State	Method	Ref.
No.	Date of execution	Name	At execution	At offense	Age difference	Gender	Ethnicity	State	Method	Ref.
1	January 5, 1933	Joseph Hudock	24	23	1	Male	White	Pennsylvania	Electrocution	
2	January 7, 1933	William Enzulus	22	22	0	Male	White	Ohio	Electrocution	
3	January 12, 1933	Peter Harris	21	20	1	Male	White	New York	Electrocution	
4	January 12, 1933	Thomas Carpenter	19	18	1	Male	Black	New York	Electrocution	
5	January 12, 1933	Charles Bates	19	18	1	Male	Black	New York	Electrocution	
6	January 19, 1933	C.W. Johnson	28	Unknown	Unknown	Male	White	California	Hanging	
7	January 19, 1933	Alexander Nunes	44	43	1	Male	White	New York	Electrocution	
8	January 20, 1933	James William Kellar Jr.	30	29	1	Male	White	Missouri	Hanging	
9	January 27, 1933	Hezekiah Avant	30	29	1	Male	White	North Carolina	Electrocution	
10	January 27, 1933	Ivory Covington	25	Unknown	Unknown	Male	Black	Oklahoma	Electrocution	
11	February 2, 1933	William Turner	22	21	1	Male	White	New York	Electrocution	
12	February 3, 1933	Willie James Johnson	Unknown	Unknown	Unknown	Male	Black	Alabama	Electrocution	
13	February 3, 1933	Charlie Jones	Unknown	Unknown	Unknown	Male	Black	Alabama	Electrocution	
14	February 3, 1933	Buce Jones	26	Unknown	Unknown	Male	Black	Louisiana	Hanging	
15	February 10, 1933	David Andrew Miller	48	44	4	Male	White	Missouri	Hanging	
16	February 10, 1933	Harry E. Worden	27	Unknown	Unknown	Male	White	Missouri	Hanging	
17	February 24, 1933	Nathan Rightsell	27	25	2	Male	White	Oklahoma	Electrocution	
18	March 2, 1933	John Edward Moore	28	28	0	Male	White	Indiana	Electrocution	
19	March 3, 1933	Phillip Morgan	42	41	1	Male	Black	Louisiana	Hanging	
20	March 3, 1933	George Woods	26	25	1	Male	Black	Louisiana	Hanging	
21	March 3, 1933	James Arthur Dicks	27	Unknown	Unknown	Male	Black	South Carolina	Electrocution	
22	March 3, 1933	James Jones	23	Unknown	Unknown	Male	Black	South Carolina	Electrocution	
23	March 3, 1933	William Sanders	18	18	0	Male	Black	South Carolina	Electrocution	
24	March 10, 1933	Nelivelt Moss	20	19	1	Male	Black	Colorado	Hanging	
25	March 10, 1933	John Downing	44	43	1	Male	White	Ohio	Electrocution	
26	March 10, 1933	Athay Brown	26	25	1	Male	Black	Ohio	Electrocution	
27	March 20, 1933	Giuseppe Zangara	32	32	0	Male	White	Florida	Electrocution	
28	March 22, 1933	Herbert W. Meeker	23	23	0	Male	White	Ohio	Electrocution	
29	March 24, 1933	Peter Martin Farrington	36	33	3	Male	White	California	Hanging	
30	March 24, 1933	Elvin E. Jeffcoat	43	40	3	Male	White	Florida	Electrocution	
31	March 24, 1933	Charles Jack Lattimer	29	27	2	Male	White	Oklahoma	Electrocution	
32	April 4, 1933	Lawrence Welch	46	44	2	Male	Black	Georgia	Electrocution	
33	April 5, 1933	John Hart	33	32	1	Male	Black	New Jersey	Electrocution	
34	April 7, 1933	Frank Carson	19	Unknown	Unknown	Male	White	Kentucky	Electrocution	
35	April 7, 1933	Sam McGee	31	29	2	Male	Black	Kentucky	Electrocution	
36	April 7, 1933	Walter Hoskins	32	30	2	Male	Black	Texas	Electrocution	
37	April 14, 1933	Richard Gaines	25	23	2	Male	Black	Kentucky	Electrocution	
38	April 14, 1933	Kermit Roosevelt Pope	33	32	1	Male	Black	Kentucky	Electrocution	
39	April 14, 1933	John L. Young Sr.	32	32	1	Male	White	Kentucky	Electrocution	
40	April 20, 1933	Alexander Kasprzcak	39	Unknown	Unknown	Male	White	New York	Electrocution	
41	April 20, 1933	Bruno Polowicz	36	Unknown	Unknown	Male	White	New York	Electrocution	
42	April 25, 1933	Andrew Prince	21	19	2	Male	Black	Mississippi	Hanging	
43	April 28, 1933	Anthony Rotunno	31	30	1	Male	White	Ohio	Electrocution	
44	April 28, 1933	Ralph Atterholt	30	29	1	Male	White	Ohio	Electrocution	
45	May 5, 1933	Joe L. Martin	54	53	1	Male	White	Oklahoma	Electrocution	
46	May 5, 1933	Proctor McDonald	24	22	2	Male	White	Oklahoma	Electrocution	
47	May 5, 1933	Albert Floyd Ellis	27	26	1	Male	White	Oklahoma	Electrocution	
48	May 8, 1933	Ray Elmer Miller	34	34	0	Male	White	Nevada	Gas chamber	
49	May 11, 1933	Talton Taylor	33	33	0	Male	White	Wyoming	Hanging	
50	May 19, 1933	Koji Hatamoto	38	37	1	Male	Asian	California	Hanging	
51	May 19, 1933	Johnny Todd	18	18	0	Male	Black	Georgia	Electrocution	
52	May 19, 1933	David McNair	23	22	1	Male	Black	North Carolina	Electrocution	
53	May 19, 1933	Luke Fink Nichols	44	43	1	Male	White	Oklahoma	Electrocution	
54	May 20, 1933	Pat Randall	Unknown	Unknown	1	Male	Black	Georgia	Electrocution	
55	May 25, 1933	Antonio Lopez	26	25	1	Male	Hispanic	New York	Electrocution	
56	June 1, 1933	William H. Jackson	40	Unknown	Unknown	Male	Black	New York	Electrocution	
57	June 12, 1933	Louis Fine	50	49	1	Male	White	New Jersey	Electrocution	
58	June 14, 1933	Raider Davis	26	26	0	Male	Black	Georgia	Electrocution	
59	June 26, 1933	John Kurutz	48	47	1	Male	White	Pennsylvania	Electrocution	
60	June 30, 1933	George Hill	19	18	1	Male	Black	Arkansas	Electrocution	
61	June 30, 1933	Frank J. Paciga	26	24	2	Male	White	California	Hanging	
62	June 30, 1933	Sampson Carter	25	25	0	Male	Black	Louisiana	Hanging	
63	July 3, 1933	John Thomas Shaw	31	29	2	Male	Black	Tennessee	Electrocution	
64	July 7, 1933	James Sandidge	45	Unknown	Unknown	Male	Black	Mississippi	Hanging	
65	July 10, 1933	Victor Palmer	24	22	2	Male	White	Florida	Electrocution	
66	July 10, 1933	Louis D. Leavine	34	32	2	Male	White	Florida	Electrocution	
67	July 10, 1933	Norman Henry Heidt	26	24	2	Male	White	Florida	Electrocution	
68	July 13, 1933	Nathaniel Covington	28	26	2	Male	Black	New York	Electrocution	
69	July 14, 1933	Woodie Williams	40	39	1	Male	Black	Arkansas	Electrocution	
70	July 14, 1933	Albert Fuller	44	42	2	Male	White	California	Hanging	
71	July 15, 1933	Leonicio Encio	37	Unknown	Unknown	Male	Asian	Hawaii Territory	Hanging	
72	July 21, 1933	Eli Terrell	25	22	3	Male	Black	Louisiana	Hanging	
73	July 21, 1933	Thomas Franklin	Unknown	Unknown	3	Male	Black	Louisiana	Hanging	
74	July 21, 1933	Mose Conner	Unknown	Unknown	3	Male	Black	Louisiana	Hanging	
75	July 21, 1933	Thomas C. Johnson	43	41	2	Male	Black	New Mexico	Electrocution	
76	July 21, 1933	Santiago Garduno	48	47	1	Male	Hispanic	New Mexico	Electrocution	
77	July 21, 1933	Ronnie Smith	21	21	0	Male	Black	South Carolina	Electrocution	
78	July 28, 1933	Glen Donald Shustrom	24	23	1	Male	White	Indiana	Electrocution	
79	July 28, 1933	Ollie Lee Stratton	23	21	2	Male	White	Washington	Hanging	
80	August 4, 1933	Olin Clay Fogleman Sr.	30	29	1	Male	White	North Carolina	Electrocution	
81	August 10, 1933	Omer Garland Brill	21	21	0	Male	White	West Virginia	Hanging	
82	August 11, 1933	Richard Morris	18	17	1	Male	Black	Georgia	Electrocution	
83	August 11, 1933	Richard Sims	18	17	1	Male	Black	Georgia	Electrocution	
84	August 11, 1933	Mose White	18	17	1	Male	Black	Georgia	Electrocution	
85	August 14, 1933	Joseph Murphy	18	17	1	Male	Black	Ohio	Electrocution	
86	August 14, 1933	James Murphy	23	22	1	Male	Black	Ohio	Electrocution	
87	August 17, 1933	John Jordan	33	Unknown	Unknown	Male	White	New York	Electrocution	
88	August 17, 1933	George Swan	21	Unknown	Unknown	Male	White	New York	Electrocution	
89	August 17, 1933	Stephen Russell Witherell	30	29	1	Male	White	New York	Electrocution	
90	August 18, 1933	Joseph Francis Regan	26	24	2	Male	White	California	Hanging	
91	August 18, 1933	R.T. Bennett	24	23	1	Male	Black	Texas	Electrocution	
92	August 23, 1933	George Oliver	18	18	0	Male	White	Oklahoma	Electrocution	
93	August 23, 1933	Claude Oliver	28	28	0	Male	White	Oklahoma	Electrocution	
94	August 24, 1933	Alexander Carrion	27	26	1	Male	Hispanic	New York	Electrocution	
95	August 24, 1933	Frank Negron	25	24	1	Male	Hispanic	New York	Electrocution	
96	August 25, 1933	Thomas Andrew McCullough	58	57	1	Male	White	Georgia	Electrocution	
97	August 25, 1933	Eugene Key	24	Unknown	Unknown	Male	Black	Georgia	Electrocution	
98	August 29, 1933	George Hoffman	53	52	1	Male	White	Montana	Hanging	
99	September 1, 1933	Henry Edmonds	50	Unknown	Unknown	Male	Black	New York	Electrocution	
100	September 1, 1933	John McKinney	42	41	1	Male	Black	New York	Electrocution	
101	September 1, 1933	John Tinsley	25	Unknown	Unknown	Male	Black	New York	Electrocution	
102	September 7, 1933	Andrew Wilcoxen	26	25	1	Male	Black	Tennessee	Electrocution	
103	September 7, 1933	Oscar Bevins	25	24	1	Male	Black	Tennessee	Electrocution	
104	September 8, 1933	Rochelle Jackson	27	26	1	Male	Black	Georgia	Electrocution	
105	September 8, 1933	Bryant Stone	45	44	1	Male	White	North Carolina	Electrocution	
106	September 15, 1933	Johnny Lee	Unknown	Unknown	Unknown	Male	Black	North Carolina	Electrocution	
107	September 18, 1933	Robert Roland Lilly	27	26	1	Male	Black	Pennsylvania	Electrocution	
108	September 22, 1933	George Smith	23	21	2	Male	White	California	Hanging	
109	October 6, 1933	Frank Mann	38	Unknown	Unknown	Male	Black	Virginia	Electrocution	
110	October 13, 1933	Morris Cohen	36	36	0	Male	White	Illinois	Electrocution	
111	October 16, 1933	Ross King	29	29	0	Male	White	Illinois	Electrocution	
112	October 20, 1933	Dallas Egan	40	39	1	Male	White	California	Hanging	
113	October 20, 1933	Harry Simpson	33	Unknown	Unknown	Male	Black	Georgia	Electrocution	
114	October 20, 1933	Jesse Patterson	32	32	0	Male	Black	Mississippi	Hanging	
115	October 20, 1933	Charles Dumas	29	28	1	Male	Black	Oklahoma	Electrocution	
116	October 20, 1933	Charles William "Ted" Patton	25	24	1	Male	White	Oklahoma	Electrocution	
117	October 27, 1933	George Meadows	27	27	0	Male	Black	Alabama	Electrocution	
118	October 27, 1933	William Clinton Robinson	20	18	2	Male	Black	District of Columbia	Electrocution	
119	October 27, 1933	Grady Brooks	19	18	1	Male	Black	Georgia	Electrocution	
120	October 27, 1933	George Zuber	29	28	1	Male	Black	Georgia	Electrocution	
121	October 27, 1933	Euel Lee	60	58	2	Male	Black	Maryland	Hanging	
122	October 30, 1933	Willie Jones	24	23	1	Male	Black	Tennessee	Electrocution	
123	November 1, 1933	Risaleno Tabiolo	23	Unknown	Unknown	Male	Asian	Hawaii Territory	Hanging	
124	November 2, 1933	John Winston Boyd	32	Unknown	Unknown	Male	Black	Missouri	Hanging	
125	November 3, 1933	William Waters	36	35	1	Male	White	Kentucky	Electrocution	
126	November 3, 1933	Ishmael Scott	24	23	1	Male	White	Kentucky	Electrocution	
127	November 8, 1933	Andreacy R. Kumachinsky	52	Unknown	Unknown	Male	White	New Jersey	Electrocution	
128	November 10, 1933	Harve Burton	46	Unknown	Unknown	Male	White	Kentucky	Electrocution	
129	November 10, 1933	Walter Dewberry	22	20	2	Male	Black	Kentucky	Electrocution	
130	November 10, 1933	William Johnson	28	27	1	Male	Black	Oklahoma	Electrocution	
131	November 17, 1933	John C. Fleming	41	39	2	Male	White	California	Hanging	
132	November 20, 1933	Marshall Williams	24	24	0	Male	Black	Texas	Electrocution	
133	November 24, 1933	Charles Edward Washington	23	21	2	Male	Black	District of Columbia	Electrocution	
134	November 24, 1933	Charles Vernon Witt	29	27	2	Male	White	Indiana	Electrocution	
135	November 24, 1933	Chester Probaski	26	25	1	Male	White	Ohio	Electrocution	
136	November 24, 1933	Merrill E. Chandler	23	21	2	Male	Black	Ohio	Electrocution	
137	November 24, 1933	Tom Morris	40	39	1	Male	Black	Oklahoma	Electrocution	
138	November 24, 1933	Earl Quinn	29	26	3	Male	White	Oklahoma	Electrocution	
139	November 24, 1933	Leo Fraser	30	30	0	Male	White	West Virginia	Hanging	
140	December 1, 1933	Dick Villon	29	Unknown	Unknown	Male	Asian	California	Hanging	
141	December 1, 1933	Walter Jones	23	22	1	Male	White	Colorado	Hanging	
142	December 1, 1933	Benjamin Montague	29	28	1	Male	Black	District of Columbia	Electrocution	
143	December 4, 1933	James Holmes	26	Unknown	Unknown	Male	Black	South Carolina	Electrocution	
144	December 4, 1933	Tom Wardlaw	53	52	1	Male	Black	South Carolina	Electrocution	
145	December 7, 1933	Jesse Scott	24	24	0	Male	Black	Mississippi	Hanging	
146	December 8, 1933	Jake C. Banks	24	24	0	Male	Black	Arkansas	Electrocution	
147	December 8, 1933	Len McDaniels	Unknown	Unknown	0	Male	Black	Arkansas	Electrocution	
148	December 8, 1933	Claude Forbes	25	24	1	Male	Native American	California	Hanging	
149	December 8, 1933	Joseph M. Corey	43	42	1	Male	Arab	West Virginia	Hanging	
150	December 12, 1933	Pantaleon Ortiz	35	34	1	Male	Hispanic	Texas	Electrocution	
151	December 15, 1933	Sam Gordon	22	20	2	Male	Black	Missouri	Hanging	
152	December 15, 1933	March Jefferson	28	26	2	Male	Black	Missouri	Hanging	
153	December 15, 1933	Clarence Thomas	19	19	0	Male	Black	Texas	Electrocution	
154	December 19, 1933	Tom Cook	34	32	2	Male	Black	Texas	Electrocution	
155	December 22, 1933	Harry Shelby	46	45	1	Male	White	Illinois	Electrocution	
156	December 22, 1933	John Allen	26	26	0	Male	White	Illinois	Electrocution	
157	December 22, 1933	Martin Gray	28	28	0	Male	Black	Illinois	Electrocution	
158	December 29, 1933	James Franklin Barbee	47	44	3	Male	White	Georgia	Electrocution	
159	December 29, 1933	Frank Vacchiano	23	22	1	Male	White	Ohio	Electrocution	
160	December 29, 1933	Dewey R. Hunt	27	22	5	Male	White	Texas	Electrocution	
161	December 29, 1933	Carl Stewart	24	23	1	Male	Black	Texas	Electrocution	
162	December 29, 1933	Clarence Booker	25	24	1	Male	Black	Texas	Electrocution	

== Demographics ==
Gender
Male	162	100%
Female	0	0%
Ethnicity
Black	81	50%
White	70	43%
Hispanic	5	3%
Asian	4	2%
Arab	1	1%
Native American	1	1%
State
New York	18	11%
Georgia	14	9%
Oklahoma	14	9%
California	11	7%
Ohio	11	7%
Kentucky	9	6%
Texas	9	6%
Louisiana	7	4%
Missouri	6	4%
South Carolina	6	4%
Florida	5	3%
Illinois	5	3%
North Carolina	5	3%
Arkansas	4	2%
Mississippi	4	2%
Tennessee	4	2%
Alabama	3	2%
District of Columbia	3	2%
Indiana	3	2%
New Jersey	3	2%
Pennsylvania	3	2%
West Virginia	3	2%
Colorado	2	1%
Hawaii Territory	2	1%
New Mexico	2	1%
Maryland	1	1%
Montana	1	1%
Nevada	1	1%
Virginia	1	1%
Washington	1	1%
Wyoming	1	1%
Method
Electrocution	122	75%
Hanging	39	24%
Gas chamber	1	1%
Month
January	10	6%
February	7	4%
March	14	9%
April	13	8%
May	11	7%
June	7	4%
July	17	10%
August	19	12%
September	10	6%
October	14	9%
November	17	10%
December	23	14%
Age
Unknown	7	4%
10–19	13	8%
20–29	80	49%
30–39	31	19%
40–49	23	14%
50–59	7	4%
60–69	1	1%
Total	162	100%

== Executions in recent years ==
Number of executions
1934	166
1933	162
1932	147
Total	475

Preceded by 1932	List of people executed in the United States in 1933	Succeeded by 1934
