= List of people executed in Kentucky (pre-1972) =

The following is a list of people executed in the U.S. state of Kentucky before 1972, when capital punishment was briefly abolished by the Supreme Court's decision in Furman v. Georgia. For people executed after the restoration of capital punishment by the Supreme Court's decision in Gregg v. Georgia (1976), see List of people executed in Kentucky.

== Background ==
Historically, all executions in Kentucky were carried out by hanging in the county of conviction. In 1910, the state's execution method was switched to electrocution, with all executions legally mandated to take place within the state penitentiary in Eddyville. Kentucky partially reverted to hangings in 1920 after the electrocution of Will Lockett for the rape and murder of a young girl, with a new law stating that death sentences for rape would be locally carried out by hanging in county jail yards with at least 50 witnesses present. Executions for rape returned to electrocution with the repeal of this law in 1938.

== List of executions ==
Local hangings for rape

Name	Race	Age	Date of execution	County	Crime	Victim(s)	Governor
James Buckner	Black	18	July 8, 1911	Marion	Murder	John Austin Robey, 55, white (Lebanon policeman)	Augustus E. Willson
Shay Pellman	Black	35	August 5, 1911	Lincoln	Rape	Nancy Jane Rankin, 11, white	Augustus E. Willson
Oliver Locks	Black	51	August 22, 1911	Jefferson	Murder	Lulie Locks, 33, black (wife)	Augustus E. Willson
Matthew Kelly	Black	37	September 28, 1911	Jefferson	Murder	Pearl Evans (girlfriend and sister-in-law) and Clara Hamilton, 22 and 20, black (Note: Given a life sentence for the murder his girlfriend, Artie Smith (black, 16), in 1901, but paroled in 1909.)	Augustus E. Willson
Charles Howard	Black	22	January 31, 1912	Franklin	Murder	Edward Rice, 30, white	James B. McCreary
Willard Richardson	White	29	April 19, 1912	Carlisle	Murder	John B. Violett, 55, white (Note: Serial killer, also confessed to two other murders in Texas for which he was a suspect but not convicted of.)	James B. McCreary
Cal Miracle	White	34	August 31, 1912	Bell	Murder	Dulcie E. Partin, 31, white (Note: Also murdered Matthew Jones (51, white) during the same crime.)	James B. McCreary
James Smith	Black	23	September 27, 1912	Mason	Murder	"Ed", black (Note: Unidentified.)	James B. McCreary
Charles Smith	Black	25	September 27, 1912	Mason	Murder	"Ed", black	James B. McCreary
James Ellis	White	28	November 22, 1912	Pulaski	Murder	Andrew Jackson Beatty and William F. Heath, 45 and 47, white (magistrate and constable)	James B. McCreary
Silas Williams	Black	17	March 21, 1913	Woodford	Murder-Rape	Susan Black, 68, white	James B. McCreary
William Wilson	Black	27	March 24, 1913	Jefferson	Murder-Robbery	Gerhard Henry Heuermann, 54, white	James B. McCreary
John Bowman	White	22	April 11, 1913	Marion	Rape	Minnie Deering, 18, white	James B. McCreary
Isom Taliaferro	Black	22	April 18, 1913	Todd	Rape	Rosa Robertson, 17, white	James B. McCreary
James Brown	Black	27	April 25, 1913	Clark	Murder	George M. Hart, 49, white (deputy sheriff)	James B. McCreary
Tom Lawson	Black	19	June 20, 1913	Shelby	Murder	Bennie Hardin Engrum, 19, white	James B. McCreary
Tom Martin	Black	23	June 20, 1913	Shelby	Murder	Bennie Hardin Engrum, 19, white	James B. McCreary
General May	White	43	June 27, 1913	Laurel (Note: Change of venue from Clay County.)	Murder	Belle Hensley Meredith, 30, white (Note: Also killed her husband, Sherman Merideth, and given a life sentence for his killing. Possible serial killer, claimed to have killed up to eight people.)	James B. McCreary
Will Lane	Black	25	July 30, 1915	Bell	Murder	Mary Lane, black (wife)	James B. McCreary
Turner Graham	White	24	July 30, 1915	Hardin	Murder	Robert Terry McMurtry, 36, white (sheriff) (Note: Also murdered James Wood prior to this crime.)	James B. McCreary
Wallace Smothers	Black	41	September 3, 1915	Clark	Rape	Georgia Baird, 7, white	James B. McCreary
John Henry	Black	24	November 19, 1915	Boyd	Murder-Robbery	Joseph C. Gibson, 34, white	James B. McCreary
Harry Garrison	Black	19	November 17, 1916	Campbell	Rape	Luella Crowder, 19, white (Note: Serial rapist, also raped and robbed another white woman.)	Augustus Owsley Stanley
John H. Blue	Black	48	August 10, 1917	Jefferson	Murder	Adam Oster, 59, white	Augustus Owsley Stanley
Melvin Collins	White	21	July 12, 1918	Carter	Murder	Three people, white (Note: Declu Vincent Carpenter (60), Grover Cleveland Sparks (35), and John Anthony Howard (44).)	Augustus Owsley Stanley
Pat Kearney	White	32	February 21, 1919	Kenton	Murder-Robbery	John Rehm and Andrew Nordmeyer, 82 and 67, white	Augustus Owsley Stanley
James Lawler	White	32	February 21, 1919	Kenton	Murder-Robbery	John Rehm and Andrew Nordmeyer, 82 and 67, white	Augustus Owsley Stanley
Lewis Harris	Black	25	June 6, 1919	Mason	Murder	Betina Miner Harris, 22, black (wife)	James D. Black
James Howard	Black	21	June 6, 1919	McCracken	Murder	William F. Romain, 35, white (Paducah patrolman)	James D. Black
Lube Martin	Black	34	July 25, 1919	Calloway	Murder	Guthrie Diuguid, 54, white (deputy constable)	James D. Black
Charles Music	White	24	March 10, 1920	Boyd	Murder-Robbery	Charles West Hatfield, 41, white (Ashland police officer)	Edwin P. Morrow
Will Lockett	Black	31	March 11, 1920	Fayette	Murder-Rape	Geneva Hardman, 10, white (Note: Serial killer, confessed to four other crimes shortly before his execution: the attempted rape of a white woman in Todd County in 1907, the murder of Grace Rogers (white) in Carmi, Illinois in 1912, the murder of Eliza Morman (25, black) in Evansville, Indiana in 1917, and the murder of Sallie Anderson Kraft (55, black) in Camp Taylor the same year. The last three victims were all raped and strangled.)	Edwin P. Morrow
Lee Ellison	Black	45	January 31, 1921	Hopkins	Murder	Richard Scott Hunter, 38, white (sheriff) (Note: Possible serial killer, claimed by his wife to have also killed two policemen in Alabama and another in Cairo, Illinois earlier that same year.)	Edwin P. Morrow
Dave Brown	White	27	November 16, 1922	Pike	Murder	James H. Brumfield, 41, white (Note: Also murdered Brumfield's infant child.)	Edwin P. Morrow
Benny Bibbs	Black	28	January 26, 1923	Christian	Murder-Robbery	Robert Lee Armstrong, 28, black	Edwin P. Morrow
Tom Nichols	Black	29	January 26, 1923	Christian	Murder	B. H. Robey, 50, white	Edwin P. Morrow
Henry S. Banks	Black	22	May 15, 1923	Scott	Murder-Burglary	William Owens Barkley, 44, white (police officer)	Edwin P. Morrow
James Powers	White	23	June 18, 1923	Kenton	Murder-Robbery	Mannie Lee, 25, white	Edwin P. Morrow
Will Chambers	Black	20	March 7, 1924	Barren	Murder-Robbery	Charles Henry Bybee, 27, white	William J. Fields
Charles Miller	Black	25	May 9, 1924	Breckinridge	Murder-Robbery	Samuel Haycraft and Edward Sago (railroad detectives), 58 and 41, white	William J. Fields
George Weick	White	51	May 9, 1924	Jefferson	Murder	William E. Oelke, 39, white	William J. Fields
Frank Thomas	White	71	May 9, 1924	Jefferson	Murder	Lee Jackson Arbegust, 58, white (Note: Serial killer, previously convicted of manslaughter for killing his superior, police captain Edward Holman Powell (35, white), while serving as a county patrolman and murdered a black man, Bert Skaggs, in 1905 but was not charged under self-defense grounds.)	William J. Fields
Leonard Griffin	Black	24	March 20, 1925	Harlan	Murder	James Valentine Gross, 39, white (constable)	William J. Fields
Sid Davis	Black	38	March 20, 1925	Fayette	Murder	John H. Johnson, 31, black	William J. Fields
George Farrell	White	24	June 26, 1925	Bourbon	Murder-Robbery	Frank Buchanan, 61, white	William J. Fields
Richard Newhouse	White	22	June 26, 1925	Bourbon	Murder-Robbery	Frank Buchanan, 61, white	William J. Fields
Elmer Hall	White	25	June 26, 1925	Bourbon	Murder-Robbery	Frank Buchanan, 61, white	William J. Fields
Harry Armand	Black	24	July 3, 1925	Jefferson	Murder-Robbery	Ambrose K. Witten, 44, white	William J. Fields
Ray Ross	Black	25	August 28, 1925	Fayette	Rape	Female, 9, black	William J. Fields
Ed Harris	Black	42	March 5, 1926	Fayette	Rape	Mary Margaret Bryant Roberts, 31, white (Note: Also murdered her husband, 30-year-old Clarence W. Bryant, and two children, 8-year-old Ethel and 5-year-old Wilberent.)	William J. Fields
John Baker	Black	34	May 28, 1926	Jefferson	Murder	Maria Hall Baker, 22, black (wife) (Note: Also killed his first wife in Kansas City, Missouri in 1915 and did a one-year sentence in the state penitentiary.)	William J. Fields
Edward Lake	White	32	May 28, 1926	Jefferson	Murder	Mary A. Smith, 36, white (Note: Also murdered his estranged wife, 36-year-old Matha Peavler Lake, and received a life sentence for her murder.)	William J. Fields
Elisha Sloan	White	30	May 28, 1926	Perry	Murder	Dr. Marvin Jackson Kingins, 28, white	William J. Fields
Smokey Harris	Black	35	December 17, 1926	Christian	Murder	Leona Clark Harris, 21, black (wife)	William J. Fields
Roger Brannon	White	22	December 17, 1926	Fayette	Murder-Robbery	William Nelson Fant, 32, white	William J. Fields
Raymond Davis	White	28	September 16, 1927	Fayette	Murder-Robbery	William Nelson Fant, 32, white	William J. Fields
Nathan Bard	Black	31	November 25, 1927	Hopkins	Rape	Katherine Breithaupt, 16, white (Note: Members of a three-man gang who committed three attempted rapes against teenage girls in March 1926 prior to this crime.)	William J. Fields
Bunyan Fleming	Black	32	November 25, 1927	Hopkins	Rape	Katherine Breithaupt, 16, white	William J. Fields
Clarence McQueen	Black	38	July 13, 1928	Harrison	Murder	Lewis Williams, 74, black	William J. Fields
James Howard	Black	22	July 13, 1928	Jefferson	Murder	Lucy Buckner, black (common-law wife)	William J. Fields
Willie Moore	Black	45	July 13, 1928	Jefferson	Murder	Anna Eslick, 30, black (girlfriend)	William J. Fields
Orlando Seymour	White	21	July 13, 1928	Jefferson	Murder-Robbery	William A. Schanzenbacher, 33, white	William J. Fields
Charles Mitra	White	22	July 13, 1928	Jefferson	Murder-Robbery	Marion A. George, 59, white	William J. Fields
Milford Lawson	White	35	July 13, 1928	Knox	Murder	John Ira Stansberry, 45, white (Note: Possible serial killer; suspected of several other murders, but not charged for any due to lack of evidence.)	William J. Fields
Hascue Dockery	White	22	July 13, 1928	Harlan	Murder	Esther M. Howard, 27, white (Note: Also murdered his in-laws, Joseph Jenkins (31, white) and Julia Creech Jenkins (28, white) during the same crime. Esther was pregnant when murdered.)	William J. Fields
Ivan Hutsell	White	27	September 13, 1929	Oldham	Murder	Jessie Zimmerman Ditchler, 28, white (Note: Also killed her husband, 47-year-old John A. Ditchler.)	William J. Fields
Carl Hord	White	21	September 13, 1929	Jefferson	Murder-Robbery	Marion A. George, 59, white	William J. Fields
Richard Edmonds	Black	36	June 13, 1930	Jefferson	Murder-Robbery	Harry S. Long, 54, white	William J. Fields
Ballard Ratcliffe	White	41	June 13, 1930	Jefferson	Murder-Robbery	William A. Muse, 64, white	William J. Fields
Walter Holmes	Black	31	April 29, 1932	Hardin	Murder-Burglary	Thomas Dye Tillery, 57, white	Ruby Laffoon
Charles Rodgers	Black	23	April 29, 1932	Hardin	Murder-Burglary	Thomas Dye Tillery, 57, white	Ruby Laffoon
A. B. Cooksey	Black	23	April 29, 1932	Hopkins	Murder	John H. Ashby, 61, white (Madisonville police chief)	Ruby Laffoon
Sam Jennings	Black	38	June 17, 1932	Breckinridge	Rape	Mabel Downs, 23, white	Ruby Laffoon
Jeff Covington	Black	30	December 17, 1932	Madison	Murder	James D. Turner, 59, white (railroad detective) (Note: Also killed two other black men, 23-year-old Howard Smith and Phil Owens, prior to this murder. Turner had previously arrested Covington for stealing coal.)	Ruby Laffoon
Sam McGee	Black	31	April 7, 1933	McCracken	Murder-Robbery	Charles Clark, 19, white	Ruby Laffoon
Frank Carson	White	19	April 7, 1933	Nelson	Murder-Robbery	Carl B. James, 58, white	Ruby Laffoon
John Young	White	37	April 14, 1933	Jefferson	Murder	Edward Earl Parr and William Leath Mulligan, 39 and 40, white (Louisville police captain and detective sergeant)	Ruby Laffoon
Kermit R. Pope	Black	33	April 14, 1933	Jefferson	Murder	Lula Mae Pope, 27, black (wife)	Ruby Laffoon
Richard Gaines	Black	25	April 14, 1933	Caldwell	Murder	George Wilson, 42, black	Ruby Laffoon
Harve Burton	White	46	November 3, 1933	Elliott	Murder	Virgie Skaggs Burton, 46, white (wife)	Ruby Laffoon
Ishmael Scott	White	40	November 3, 1933	Floyd	Murder	Martin Stephens, 34, white (Note: Also previously murdered Charles Burnette (20, white) in Wayland.)	Ruby Laffoon
William Waters	White	36	November 3, 1933	Montgomery (Note: Change of venue from Menifee County.)	Murder	Stanley Cole Helton, 26, white (deputy sheriff) (Note: Serial killer, also killed 40-year-old deputy sheriff Marion Stapleton during this crime and 56-year-old Charles Neil two days prior. Reportedly killed up to ten people.)	Ruby Laffoon
Walter Dewberry	Black	22	November 10, 1933	Hardin	Murder-Burglary	Thomas Dye Tillery, 57, white	Ruby Laffoon
Will Chaney	Black	49	August 24, 1934	Jefferson	Murder	George Bottoms, 21, black	Ruby Laffoon
George W. Tincher	White	37	August 24, 1934	Scott	Murder-Robbery	Ben Michele Kennon, 58, white	Ruby Laffoon
Francis Glenday	White	29	December 7, 1934	Scott	Murder-Robbery	Ben Michele Kennon, 58, white	Ruby Laffoon
Wiley Graves	Black	29	February 22, 1935	Fayette	Murder	Charles W. Taylor, 30, white (Note: Killed another black man in 1930 but acquitted.)	Ruby Laffoon
Charlie Williams	Black	27	March 1, 1935	Christian	Murder-Robbery	Grant E. Lane, 38, white	Ruby Laffoon
William T. DeBoe	White	22	April 19, 1935	Livingston	Rape-Robbery	Marjorie Johnson, 32, white (Note: Serial rapist, also raped Amy Driskill (50, white) and Emma Mentz (76, white))	Ruby Laffoon
James Smith	Black	30	May 24, 1935	Fayette	Murder	Leslie Poyntz, 53, black	Ruby Laffoon
Bill Young	White	23	June 28, 1935	Harlan	Murder	Joe Wheeler Cawood, 36, white	Ruby Laffoon
Eulie Lotheridge	White	26	December 6, 1935	Carroll	Murder-Robbery	Theodore Fitschen, 56, white	Ruby Laffoon
Neal Bowman	White	33	January 10, 1936	Mercer	Murder	Comer Franklin, 17, white (Note: Also previously murdered 46-year-old George Kaufman during a robbery.)	Happy Chandler
Willard Hall	White	33	January 17, 1936	Jefferson	Murder-Robbery	John Bernard Schroering, 65, white (Note: Also murdered 40-year-old Cecil Carter and 71-year-old Samuel Horine during the same crime.)	Happy Chandler
Calvin Tate	White	21	January 17, 1936	Jefferson	Murder-Robbery	John Bernard Schroering, 65, white	Happy Chandler
James Matthews	White	19	January 31, 1936	McCreary	Murder-Robbery	Cleve Spradlin, 24, white	Happy Chandler
Bennie Lee	Black	27	February 21, 1936	Bell	Murder-Robbery	James Robert Townes, 56, black	Happy Chandler
Erleon Whitehead	White	34	March 20, 1936	Barren	Murder-Burglary	John Allen, 68, black (Note: First documented case in Kentucky's state history of a white defendant being executed for killing a black victim.)	Happy Chandler
Alfred Drake	Black	30	May 15, 1936	Jefferson	Murder	James Edward Simpson, 60, black (Louisville merchant police officer)	Happy Chandler
Roy Simmons	Black	22	May 15, 1936	McCracken	Murder	Richard Kelly, 31, white (railroad detective)	Happy Chandler
James R. Woodford	Black	22	May 29, 1936	Fayette	Murder-Robbery	John M. Anderson, 62, white	Happy Chandler
Homer Young	Black	39	June 5, 1936	Bell	Murder	Enoch Beeler, 28, white	Happy Chandler
Rainey Bethea	Black	22	August 14, 1936	Daviess	Rape-Burglary (Note: Also murdered the victim.)	Lishia Edwards, 70, white	Happy Chandler
George B. Underwood	White	23	February 19, 1937	Bullitt	Murder	Wallace van Fleet, 55, white	Happy Chandler
Sam Franklin	Black	24	March 19, 1937	Jefferson	Robbery	John C. O'Connor, 45, white	Happy Chandler
Arnold Clift	White	24	July 16, 1937	Laurel	Murder-Robbery	Reed A. and Effie Cox Taylor, 58 and 50, white	Happy Chandler
Perry Marion	White	27	November 12, 1937	Laurel	Murder-Robbery	Reed A. and Effie Cox Taylor, 58 and 50, white	Happy Chandler
John Montjoy	Black	23	December 17, 1937	Kenton	Rape-Robbery	Female, white	Happy Chandler
Troy Triplett	White	22	May 20, 1938	Letcher	Murder	Dolph Hall, 40, white	Happy Chandler
Harold Venison	Black	36	June 3, 1938	Kenton	Rape	Eleanor Nieberling, 25, white (Note: Previously charged with two shootings (unknown if fatal), serving 110 days in New Albany, Indiana for one and acquitted of the other.)	Happy Chandler
Parkie Denny	White	43	September 2, 1938	Madison	Murder	Ethel Yates Denny, 49, white (wife)	Happy Chandler
Leonard Mosley	Black	43	October 28, 1938	Meade	Rape-Burglary (Note: The victim later died as a result of the attack on February 17, 1939.)	Beulah Fontaine Hook, 57, white	Happy Chandler
Sylvester Warner	White	29	February 10, 1939	Casey	Murder-Burglary	John D. and Clay White, 81 and 51, white	Happy Chandler
Bonnie Griffin	White	24	March 3, 1939	Estill	Murder-Burglary	Marion Francis and Martha Bremer Short, 75 and 40, white	Happy Chandler
Arnold Powell	White	23	March 3, 1939	Estill	Murder-Burglary	Marion Francis and Martha Bremer Short, 75 and 40, white	Happy Chandler
Willie Waters	Black	46	March 24, 1939	Jefferson	Murder	Ella Caldwell Waters, 42, black (wife)	Happy Chandler
Arvil Rice	White	20	July 7, 1939	Bell	Murder-Robbery	Walter Ludwig Dorfman, 23, white	Happy Chandler
Charles H. Smith	White	40	July 14, 1939	Lyon	Murder	Clayton Sloan, 23, white (cellmate) (Note: Serial killer serving a life sentence at the state penitentiary, had two previous murders on record, including the murder of another inmate (Arthur Cunningham, 28, white) resulting in a 21-year manslaughter sentence. Sloan was serving three years for horse theft.)	Happy Chandler
Jack Davis	White	47	July 21, 1939	Leslie	Murder	Abram Combs, 30, white	Happy Chandler
Edward Higgins	Black	26	July 25, 1939	Mercer	Rape	Mollie Cunningham, 76, white (Note: Also attempted to rape Mrs. Garnett Leonard (23, white) shortly before this attack.)	Happy Chandler
Henry Phillips	Black	41	July 26, 1940	Jefferson	Murder	Ellie P. Williamson, 46, black (common-law wife)	Keen Johnson
Ernest Houston	Black	21	August 30, 1940	Jefferson	Murder-Robbery	Arnold Smith, 27, white	Keen Johnson
Columbus Richardson	Black	27	January 20, 1941	McCracken	Murder	Tom McNary, 64, black	Keen Johnson
Grover Chism	White	49	July 4, 1941	Hardin	Murder	Schuyler McClure, 68, white	Keen Johnson
Bill Smiddy	White	35	August 29, 1941	Whitley	Murder	Faye Meadows Smiddy, 17, white (wife) (Note: Also the prime suspect in the murder of Alfred Sharp (47, white) near Jellico, Tennessee.)	Keen Johnson
James Satterfield	Black	35	February 20, 1942	Jefferson	Murder	John Wesley Hall Jr., 23, black	Keen Johnson
Eugene Burnam	Black	18	March 27, 1942	Fayette	Rape	Hazel Perkins, 22, white (Note: Serial rapist, also attempted to rape two other white women.)	Keen Johnson
Robert Williams	Black	23	June 5, 1942	Fayette	Rape-Burglary	Virgie Wigginton, 23, white	Keen Johnson
James Lee Robertson	Black	26	August 7, 1942	Fayette (Note: Change of venue from Perry County.)	Murder-Rape	Bertha Lehman, 27, white (Note: Previously convicted of killing Sam Kaynor and raping a woman who was with him in March 1941.)	Keen Johnson
Otis Peter Smith	Black	30	August 28, 1942	Jefferson	Murder-Robbery	Edward B. Hite, 54, white	Keen Johnson
Jess Sanders	Black	56	August 28, 1942	Jefferson	Murder	Katriona Motley Sanders, 44, black (ex-wife)	Keen Johnson
Burnett Sexton	White	18	January 15, 1943	Perry	Murder-Robbery	Robert McIntyre, 50, white	Keen Johnson
McCoy Combs	White	21	January 15, 1943	Perry	Murder-Robbery	Robert McIntyre, 50, white	Keen Johnson
Ernest Trent	White	26	February 26, 1943	Breathitt	Murder	Hiram Smith, 35, white (constable)	Keen Johnson
Raymond S. Baxter	White	28	February 26, 1943	Fayette	Murder-Burglary	Elsie Ego and Marion Ego Miley, 52 and 27, white	Keen Johnson
Thomas Penney	White	32	February 26, 1943	Fayette	Murder-Burglary	Elsie Ego and Marion Ego Miley, 52 and 27, white	Keen Johnson
Robert Anderson	White	36	February 26, 1943	Fayette	Murder-Burglary	Elsie Ego and Marion Ego Miley, 52 and 27, white	Keen Johnson
Archie Simpson	Black	20	June 25, 1943	Fayette	Murder-Robbery	Byrd Taulbee, 66, white	Keen Johnson
William Carson Gray	Black	17	June 25, 1943	Fayette	Murder-Robbery	Byrd Taulbee, 66, white	Keen Johnson
Thomas Bass	Black	25	March 16, 1945	Jefferson	Murder-Robbery	John Thomas Brown, 60, black	Simeon Willis
Tommy Nelson	White	35	March 16, 1945	Pike	Murder	Frelin Estepp, 55, white	Simeon Willis
Carl Fox	Black	18	April 6, 1945	Campbell	Rape	Myrtle Barnes, 16, white	Simeon Willis
Ed Hambrick	Black	26	May 25, 1945	Campbell	Rape	Myrtle Barnes, 16, white	Simeon Willis
Anderson Adkins	White	33	March 15, 1946	Pike	Murder	Jettie Johnson, 50, white (Note: Also murdered Vernie Bentley Long (34) and Clarence Blackburn (29) during the same crime, and permanently blinded a fourth victim who survived her injuries.)	Simeon Willis
Arthur Jones	Black	17	March 22, 1946	Mason	Murder-Robbery	Samuel Oliver Greenlee, 80, white	Simeon Willis
Thomas Earl Warner	Black	20	March 22, 1946	Mason	Murder-Robbery	Samuel Oliver Greenlee, 80, white	Simeon Willis
Edward Calhoun	White	22	May 24, 1946	Garrard	Murder-Robbery	John Hager, 43, white	Simeon Willis
Earl L. Tungett	White	25	July 11, 1947	Lyon	Murder	Luther Roscoe Gumm, 61, white (deputy warden) (Note: Serving a life sentence for the murder of John William Westbrook (33, white) in Louisville, shot Gumm during an escape attempt.)	Simeon Willis
Luther Williams	Black	27	February 27, 1948	Pulaski	Murder-Rape-Burglary-Kidnap	Mary Ada Hughes, 55, white	Earle Clements
Jasper Nease	White	23	July 30, 1948	Jefferson	Robbery (Note: Also kidnapped and later murdered the victim in Perry County.)	Vernon L. Hodge, 26, white	Earle Clements
Daniel T. McPeak	White	21	November 5, 1948	Jefferson	Robbery	Vernon L. Hodge, 26, white	Earle Clements
Charlie Pool	Black	44	January 28, 1949	Christian	Murder-Rape	Virginia Gray Harris, 29, white (love interest)	Earle Clements
Herbert H. Workman	White	20	March 4, 1949	Jefferson	Robbery	Vernon L. Hodge, 26, white	Earle Clements
Lawrence B. Lightfoot	White	27	June 24, 1949	Campbell	Murder-Robbery	William Harvey Childers, 84, white	Earle Clements
Raymond Ellison	White	39	February 24, 1950	Muhlenberg	Murder	Imogene Sims Ellison, 12, white (wife) (Note: Charged with having carnal knowledge of Sims in 1947 when she was 11, and married her to avoid potential execution for rape if convicted.)	Earle Clements
Columbus Webb	White	42	June 16, 1950	Martin	Murder-Robbery	Elijah Davis, 36, white	Earle Clements
Albert Shelkels	Black	20	June 8, 1951	Jefferson	Robbery (Note: Also murdered the victim.)	Milton Zimmerman, 29, white	Lawrence Wetherby
James I. Robinson	White	33	January 18, 1952	Jefferson	Murder-Rape	Joyce Joan Shouse, 3, white	Lawrence Wetherby
Earl D. Bircham	White	49	February 1, 1952	Jefferson	Murder	John Harold Tennyson, 30, white (Louisville patrolman)	Lawrence Wetherby
Jessie Lee Quarles	Black	27	April 4, 1952	Christian	Murder-Robbery	James Everett Grady, 34, white	Lawrence Wetherby
Roosevelt Spears	Black	47	February 27, 1953	Campbell	Murder	Charles Edward Thompson, 27, black	Lawrence Wetherby
Thomas William Reed	Black	45	June 4, 1954	Jefferson	Murder	Louise Young, 30, black (common-law wife) (Note: Also murdered his second common-law wife, 32-year-old Lena Lewis. Young and Lewis were buried under the coal house behind Reed's home and their skeletal remains were discovered by a plumber's helper in 1948.)	Lawrence Wetherby
Leonard Tarrance	White	26	March 18, 1955	Jefferson	Murder	Francis J. McCormack, 53, white	Lawrence Wetherby
Roy Tarrance	White	49	March 18, 1955	Jefferson	Murder	Francis J. McCormack, 53, white	Lawrence Wetherby
Ed Milam	Black	25	September 16, 1955	Christian	Murder-Robbery	Stephen Farmer, 61, white	Lawrence Wetherby
David Nichols	Black	55	December 23, 1955	Jefferson	Murder	Mary Georgia Roberts, 38, black (common-law wife)	Happy Chandler
Chester Merrifield	White	34	December 23, 1955	Jefferson	Murder	Alvin Lee Keown, 34, white (police officer)	Happy Chandler
Robert Lee Sheckles	Black	22	November 30, 1956	Jefferson	Rape-Kidnap	Female, 28, white	Happy Chandler
Charles C. DeBerry	Black	20	November 30, 1956	Jefferson	Murder-Burglary	Richard V. Eddins, 54, white	Happy Chandler
James F. Bowman	Black	44	November 30, 1956	Jefferson	Murder-Rape	Roberta Busby, 72, white	Happy Chandler
Kelly Moss	White	47	March 2, 1962	Henderson	Murder	Charles Abbitt, 74, white (stepfather)	Bert Combs

== See also ==
- Capital punishment in Kentucky
- Crime in Kentucky
