= List of people executed in the United States in 1932 =

One hundred and forty-seven people, all male, were executed in the United States in 1932, one hundred and five by electrocution, forty-one by hanging, and one by gas chamber.

== List of people executed in the United States in 1932 ==
No.	Date of execution	Name	Age of person			Gender	Ethnicity	State	Method	Ref.
No.	Date of execution	Name	At execution	At offense	Age difference	Gender	Ethnicity	State	Method	Ref.
1	January 7, 1932	Alfonso Carrato	41	40	1	Male	White	New York	Electrocution	
2	January 7, 1932	Joseph Caricari	27	26	1	Male	White	New York	Electrocution	
3	January 8, 1932	Francis Henry Bell	30	29	1	Male	White	Illinois	Electrocution	
4	January 8, 1932	Asbury Respus	53	53	0	Male	Black	North Carolina	Electrocution	
5	January 8, 1932	Gust Tangules	37	37	0	Male	White	Ohio	Electrocution	
6	January 8, 1932	James L. Sturdevant	Unknown	Unknown	Unknown	Male	Black	South Carolina	Electrocution	
7	January 8, 1932	David King	22	21	1	Male	Black	South Carolina	Electrocution	
8	January 8, 1932	Richard Dean	17	16	1	Male	Black	South Carolina	Electrocution	
9	January 8, 1932	Alfred Jackson	49	47	2	Male	Black	Texas	Electrocution	
10	January 8, 1932	Joseph Ira McKee	32	31	1	Male	White	Texas	Electrocution	
11	January 13, 1932	Waddell Cosey	21	20	1	Male	Black	Mississippi	Hanging	
12	January 14, 1932	Joseph Senna	32	31	1	Male	White	New York	Electrocution	
13	January 15, 1932	Charlie Williams	28	27	1	Male	Black	Alabama	Electrocution	
14	January 15, 1932	Richard Ashe	24	23	1	Male	Black	Alabama	Electrocution	
15	January 15, 1932	Benjamin Norsingle	26	26	0	Male	Black	Illinois	Electrocution	
16	January 15, 1932	John Reed	19	19	0	Male	Black	Illinois	Electrocution	
17	January 15, 1932	Thomas Blackson	42	Unknown	Unknown	Male	Black	Maryland	Hanging	
18	January 15, 1932	Joe Hershon	25	23	2	Male	White	Missouri	Hanging	
19	January 15, 1932	David Guy Fairley	43	42	1	Male	White	Mississippi	Hanging	
20	January 21, 1932	Francis Crowley	19	18	1	Male	White	New York	Electrocution	
21	January 28, 1932	Gavino Demiar	32	32	0	Male	Asian	New York	Electrocution	
22	January 29, 1932	William Henry Burkhart	29	27	2	Male	White	California	Hanging	
23	January 29, 1932	John Henry Lee	Unknown	Unknown	Unknown	Male	Black	Louisiana	Hanging	
24	February 1, 1932	Joseph Kosh	28	26	2	Male	White	Pennsylvania	Electrocution	
25	February 9, 1932	Major Johnson	43	42	1	Male	White	Georgia	Electrocution	
26	February 9, 1932	Eddie March	16	15	1	Male	Black	Georgia	Electrocution	
27	February 12, 1932	Herbert Johnson	33	32	1	Male	White	Indiana	Electrocution	
28	February 12, 1932	Shade Lee	38	36	2	Male	Black	Louisiana	Hanging	
29	February 26, 1932	Lee Jacobs	22	Unknown	Unknown	Male	Black	Florida	Electrocution	
30	February 29, 1932	Joseph Roman	39	39	0	Male	White	Pennsylvania	Electrocution	
31	March 3, 1932	Lew Edward Worden	34	34	0	Male	White	Missouri	Hanging	
32	March 11, 1932	Percy Irvin	40	Unknown	Unknown	Male	Black	Alabama	Electrocution	
33	March 11, 1932	Isaac Mims	25	Unknown	Unknown	Male	Black	Alabama	Electrocution	
34	March 11, 1932	Daniel Hunt	58	58	0	Male	White	Ohio	Electrocution	
35	March 11, 1932	Martin A. Keeney	49	48	1	Male	White	Oklahoma	Electrocution	
36	March 18, 1932	E.J. Farmer	58	56	2	Male	White	Colorado	Hanging	
37	March 18, 1932	Harry F. Powers	39	38	1	Male	White	West Virginia	Hanging	
38	March 25, 1932	John Myers	30	30	0	Male	Black	North Carolina	Electrocution	
39	March 28, 1932	Quincy Wallandz	25	24	1	Male	Black	Pennsylvania	Electrocution	
40	March 31, 1932	Peter Sardini	28	27	1	Male	White	New York	Electrocution	
41	March 31, 1932	Dominick Scifo	24	23	1	Male	White	New York	Electrocution	
42	March 31, 1932	Michael Roadick	21	20	1	Male	White	New York	Electrocution	
43	March 31, 1932	Walter Borowsky	24	23	1	Male	White	New York	Electrocution	
44	April 1, 1932	William Moore Frazer	32	31	1	Male	White	New Jersey	Electrocution	
45	April 1, 1932	Jake White	45	45	0	Male	Black	Texas	Electrocution	
46	April 8, 1932	James H. Parker	38	36	2	Male	White	Georgia	Electrocution	
47	April 8, 1932	Walter F. Wright	29	29	0	Male	Black	Maryland	Hanging	
48	April 15, 1932	Tresco Lacang	26	24	2	Male	Asian	California	Hanging	
49	April 15, 1932	Harold Carpenter	31	30	1	Male	White	Washington	Hanging	
50	April 15, 1932	Walter Dubuc	17	16	1	Male	White	Washington	Hanging	
51	April 21, 1932	Charlie Wright	Unknown	Unknown	Unknown	Male	Black	Mississippi	Hanging	
52	April 22, 1932	John W. Glasscock	35	34	1	Male	White	Ohio	Electrocution	
53	April 25, 1932	Raymond George	23	Unknown	Unknown	Male	Black	New Jersey	Electrocution	
54	April 29, 1932	A.B. Cooksey	23	20	3	Male	Black	Kentucky	Electrocution	
55	April 29, 1932	Walter Holmes	32	31	1	Male	Black	Kentucky	Electrocution	
56	April 29, 1932	Charles Rodgers	23	22	1	Male	Black	Kentucky	Electrocution	
57	April 29, 1932	Dudley Moore	19	18	1	Male	Black	North Carolina	Electrocution	
58	April 29, 1932	Roy Jones	23	Unknown	Unknown	Male	Black	South Carolina	Electrocution	
59	May 6, 1932	Alfred Scott Aldridge	28	25	3	Male	Black	District of Columbia	Electrocution	
60	May 12, 1932	Eddie B. Weeks	24	Unknown	Unknown	Male	Black	Mississippi	Hanging	
61	May 12, 1932	James Blount	Unknown	Unknown	Unknown	Male	Black	West Virginia	Hanging	
62	May 13, 1932	Frank Franco	53	51	2	Male	White	California	Hanging	
63	May 16, 1932	Fredrick Collins	37	37	0	Male	Black	Pennsylvania	Electrocution	
64	May 20, 1932	James Williams	27	Unknown	Unknown	Male	Black	Texas	Electrocution	
65	May 20, 1932	Sam Pannell	18	Unknown	Unknown	Male	Black	Virginia	Electrocution	
66	May 27, 1932	Joe Maestas	25	24	1	Male	White	Colorado	Hanging	
67	May 27, 1932	Emanuel Jackson	25	24	1	Male	Black	Mississippi	Hanging	
68	June 1, 1932	Austin Hart	28	26	2	Male	White	Louisiana	Hanging	
69	June 1, 1932	Ito Jacques	26	24	2	Male	Black	Louisiana	Hanging	
70	June 1, 1932	George O'Day	21	19	2	Male	White	Louisiana	Hanging	
71	June 1, 1932	E.L. Patterson	48	47	1	Male	White	Louisiana	Hanging	
72	June 1, 1932	Donald Rylich	26	24	2	Male	White	Louisiana	Hanging	
73	June 1, 1932	Boris Tolett	30	29	1	Male	White	Louisiana	Hanging	
74	June 3, 1932	Walker Brown	26	26	0	Male	Black	Ohio	Electrocution	
75	June 3, 1932	Henry Cleveland Loudermilk	47	47	0	Male	White	Ohio	Electrocution	
76	June 3, 1932	Randolph Cornelius Cox	41	39	2	Male	Black	Virginia	Electrocution	
77	June 8, 1932	Eugene Edgar Compo	22	21	1	Male	White	New Jersey	Electrocution	
78	June 9, 1932	John Dawson	35	Unknown	Unknown	Male	Black	New York	Electrocution	
79	June 10, 1932	Victor Farolan	48	46	2	Male	Asian	California	Hanging	
80	June 10, 1932	Willie Rounds	26	25	1	Male	Black	Georgia	Electrocution	
81	June 10, 1932	Lacey Adams	38	38	0	Male	Black	Ohio	Electrocution	
82	June 10, 1932	Estanislado Lopez	30	Unknown	Unknown	Male	Hispanic	Texas	Electrocution	
83	June 15, 1932	Armand Savoie	43	43	0	Male	Black	Louisiana	Hanging	
84	June 17, 1932	Sam Jennings	37	35	2	Male	Black	Ohio	Hanging	
85	June 17, 1932	Albert M. Harris	49	47	2	Male	White	Oklahoma	Electrocution	
86	June 27, 1932	William Hall DeGrasse Jr.	21	21	0	Male	White	Pennsylvania	Electrocution	
87	June 29, 1932	John Borum	26	24	2	Male	Black	District of Columbia	Electrocution	
88	June 29, 1932	John Logan	24	22	2	Male	Black	District of Columbia	Electrocution	
89	July 1, 1932	Ulysses MacKneezer	31	28	3	Male	Black	Indiana	Electrocution	
90	July 2, 1932	Frank Giordano	33	32	1	Male	White	New York	Electrocution	
91	July 2, 1932	Dominick Odierno	21	20	1	Male	White	New York	Electrocution	
92	July 7, 1932	Bert A. Stacy	58	56	2	Male	White	Vermont	Electrocution	
93	July 8, 1932	Louis McBride	36	35	1	Male	Black	Arkansas	Electrocution	
94	July 15, 1932	William Plato Edney	32	31	1	Male	White	North Carolina	Electrocution	
95	July 15, 1932	Alfred Corbellini	21	20	1	Male	White	New York	Electrocution	
96	July 15, 1932	Alfred Cozzi	20	19	1	Male	White	New York	Electrocution	
97	July 15, 1932	Hilton Williams	28	26	2	Male	Black	South Carolina	Electrocution	
98	July 20, 1932	Giuseppe Di Dolce	43	41	2	Male	White	New Jersey	Electrocution	
99	July 21, 1932	Luigi Raffa	36	35	1	Male	White	New York	Electrocution	
100	July 21, 1932	Louis Katoff	25	Unknown	Unknown	Male	White	New York	Electrocution	
101	July 21, 1932	Frank Mayo	29	28	1	Male	White	New York	Electrocution	
102	July 22, 1932	Arthur Little	39	38	1	Male	Black	Ohio	Electrocution	
103	July 28, 1932	Lazaro Calibo	23	23	0	Male	Asian	Hawaii Territory	Hanging	
104	July 28, 1932	Charlie Grogans	35	34	1	Male	Black	Texas	Electrocution	
105	July 29, 1932	Booker T. Copeland	35	35	0	Male	Black	South Carolina	Electrocution	
106	July 29, 1932	Buster Tucker	25	25	0	Male	Black	South Carolina	Electrocution	
107	July 29, 1932	Eban Woods	32	Unknown	Unknown	Male	Black	South Carolina	Electrocution	
108	August 5, 1932	John L. Green	18	17	1	Male	Black	Texas	Electrocution	
109	August 5, 1932	Ernest Johnson	21	20	1	Male	Black	Texas	Electrocution	
110	August 8, 1932	Willie Jones	24	24	0	Male	Black	Georgia	Electrocution	
111	August 10, 1932	Richard Brown	19	18	1	Male	Black	Texas	Electrocution	
112	August 10, 1932	Richard Johnson	31	30	1	Male	Black	Texas	Electrocution	
113	August 12, 1932	Sylvester Norman Fernandes	24	23	1	Male	White	Massachusetts	Electrocution	
114	August 19, 1932	Thomas H. Walker	49	48	1	Male	White	California	Hanging	
115	August 19, 1932	Clarence Dixon	38	38	0	Male	Black	Louisiana	Hanging	
116	August 19, 1932	Ira Jay Alder	50	49	1	Male	White	Oklahoma	Electrocution	
117	August 19, 1932	Charles Fillmore Davis	42	41	1	Male	Black	Oklahoma	Electrocution	
118	August 26, 1932	Nord Donnell	24	23	1	Male	Black	North Carolina	Electrocution	
119	August 27, 1932	Elmer Gray	42	41	1	Male	White	Illinois	Electrocution	
120	September 2, 1932	George Harris	35	33	2	Male	White	New York	Electrocution	
121	September 16, 1932	Louis Rudd	30	30	0	Male	Black	Louisiana	Hanging	
122	September 23, 1932	James Smith	21	20	1	Male	Black	Illinois	Electrocution	
123	October 7, 1932	Albert Jackson	21	19	2	Male	Black	Georgia	Electrocution	
124	October 14, 1932	Leroy Lee	24	23	1	Male	Black	North Carolina	Electrocution	
125	October 28, 1932	Billy Monroe	30	30	0	Male	White	California	Hanging	
126	October 28, 1932	Paschall Baker	32	32	0	Male	Black	Georgia	Electrocution	
127	October 28, 1932	Charlie Green Jr.	32	32	0	Male	Black	Georgia	Electrocution	
128	October 28, 1932	Roger Dudley Roberts	Unknown	Unknown	0	Male	Black	Mississippi	Hanging	
129	November 4, 1932	Fred Avery Hulsey Sr.	31	28	3	Male	White	Georgia	Electrocution	
130	November 4, 1932	William Avery Hulsey	54	52	2	Male	White	Georgia	Electrocution	
131	November 5, 1932	John Lee Humphreys	20	Unknown	Unknown	Male	Black	Georgia	Electrocution	
132	November 16, 1932	J.C. Jackson	23	23	0	Male	Black	Georgia	Electrocution	
133	November 18, 1932	Robert Woodward	35	34	1	Male	Black	Mississippi	Hanging	
134	November 18, 1932	Will Dixon	50	49	1	Male	Black	Mississippi	Hanging	
135	November 25, 1932	Freeling Daniels	34	34	0	Male	Black	Arkansas	Electrocution	
136	November 25, 1932	Leaval Hubbard	21	21	0	Male	Black	Louisiana	Hanging	
137	November 25, 1932	Columbus Barton	48	47	1	Male	Black	Mississippi	Hanging	
138	November 28, 1932	John Hall	53	51	2	Male	White	Nevada	Gas chamber	
139	December 1, 1932	Willie Ross Weatherford	34	33	1	Male	Native American	Mississippi	Hanging	
140	December 3, 1932	Charles Morris	33	31	2	Male	Black	District of Columbia	Electrocution	
141	December 10, 1932	Charles Markowitz	21	20	1	Male	White	New York	Electrocution	
142	December 10, 1932	Joseph Brown	20	19	1	Male	White	New York	Electrocution	
143	December 16, 1932	Harvey Wallace	32	32	0	Male	Black	North Carolina	Electrocution	
144	December 16, 1932	Alec Grier	22	Unknown	Unknown	Male	Black	North Carolina	Electrocution	
145	December 16, 1932	Oliver Edgar Smith Howell	42	40	2	Male	White	South Carolina	Electrocution	
146	December 17, 1932	Jeff Covington	30	29	1	Male	Black	Kentucky	Electrocution	
147	December 30, 1932	Henry Lewis	24	23	1	Male	Black	Louisiana	Hanging	

== Demographics ==
Gender
Male	147	100%
Female	0	0%
Ethnicity
Black	80	54%
White	61	41%
Asian	4	3%
Hispanic	1	1%
Native American	1	1%
State
New York	20	14%
Louisiana	13	9%
Georgia	12	8%
Mississippi	10	7%
Texas	10	7%
South Carolina	9	6%
North Carolina	8	5%
Ohio	7	5%
California	6	4%
Illinois	5	3%
Kentucky	5	3%
Pennsylvania	5	3%
Alabama	4	3%
District of Columbia	4	3%
New Jersey	4	3%
Oklahoma	4	3%
Arkansas	2	1%
Colorado	2	1%
Indiana	2	1%
Maryland	2	1%
Missouri	2	1%
Virginia	2	1%
Washington	2	1%
West Virginia	2	1%
Florida	1	1%
Hawaii Territory	1	1%
Massachusetts	1	1%
Nevada	1	1%
Vermont	1	1%
Method
Electrocution	105	71%
Hanging	41	28%
Gas chamber	1	1%
Month
January	23	16%
February	7	5%
March	13	9%
April	15	10%
May	9	6%
June	21	14%
July	19	13%
August	12	8%
September	3	2%
October	6	4%
November	10	7%
December	9	6%
Age
Unknown	5	3%
10–19	9	6%
20–29	59	40%
30–39	45	31%
40–49	20	14%
50–59	9	6%
Total	147	100%

== Executions in recent years ==
Number of executions
1933	162
1932	147
1931	155
Total	464

Preceded by 1931	List of people executed in the United States in 1932	Succeeded by 1933
