= Devoney Looser =

American literary and Jane Austen scholar

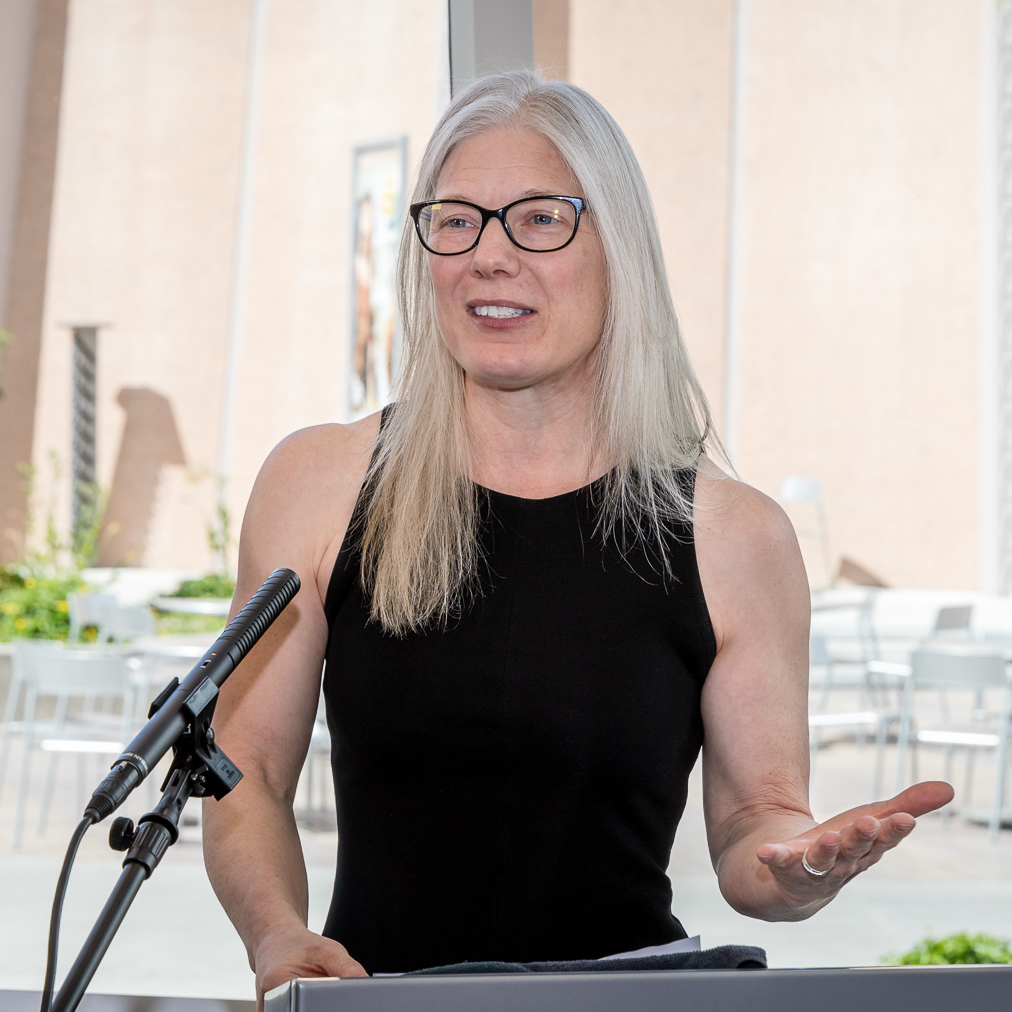
- Looser speaking at ASU's 2019 graduation
- Born: April 11, 1967 (age 59); Saint Paul, Minnesota, US
- Occupation: University Professor
- Spouse: George Justice
- Children: 2
- Awards: Guggenheim Fellowship

Academic background
- Education: BA, 1989, Augsburg College; PhD, 1993, Stony Brook University
- Thesis: Rethinking women/history/literature: a feminist investigation of disciplinarity in Lucy Hutchinson, Lady Mary Wortley Montagu, Charlotte Lennox, and Jane Austen (1993)

Academic work
- Discipline: English literature
- Sub-discipline: Jane Austen
- Institutions: Louisiana State University; University of Missouri; Arizona State University
- Website: devoneylooser.com

Devoney Kay Looser (born April 11, 1967) is an American literary critic and Jane Austen scholar. She is Regents Professor of English at Arizona State University, where she focuses on women's writing and the history of the novel.

== Early life and education ==
Looser was born in Saint Paul, Minnesota on April 11, 1967, and raised in White Bear Lake, Minnesota, where her mother first introduced her to Jane Austen's work. Looser attended and graduated from Hill-Murray School in Maplewood, Minnesota in 1985.

As a first-generation college student, Looser received a Bachelor of Arts in English from Augsburg College in 1989 and later earned her doctorate in English with a certification in women's studies from Stony Brook University.

== Career ==
After teaching at Indiana State University, University of Wisconsin-Whitewater, Louisiana State University, and the University of Missouri, Looser accepted a faculty appointment at Arizona State University in 2013.

In 2018, Looser was appointed a Foundation Professor of English for her outstanding faculty accomplishments. In 2020, she was named a Regents Professor, the highest faculty honor awarded at Arizona State University.

She has played roller derby as Stone Cold Jane Austen.

== Books and essays ==
Looser is the author or editor of twelve books, most recently Wild for Austen: A Rebellious, Subversive, and Untamed Jane, published by St. Martin's Press (2025). It considers Austen's writings, life, and reputation and "traces the fascinating and fantastical journey her legacy has taken over the past 250 years."

Her book Sister Novelists: The Trailblazing Porter Sisters Who Paved the Way for Austen and the Brontës (2022) is the first full-length biography of Jane and Anna Maria Porter, innovators of bestselling historical fiction before Sir Walter Scott.

Looser is also the author of The Making of Jane Austen, which focused on how Austen's popular influencers shaped her reputation, including as "a transnational figure used in support of women's suffrage." Publishers Weekly named The Making of Jane Austen a Best Summer Book (Non-Fiction).

Her first book was British Women Writers and the Writing of History, 1670–1820, which examined British women writers and their contributions to historiography. She followed this up with Women Writers and Old Age in Great Britain, 1750–1850 in 2008.

Looser's essays and op-eds have appeared in The New York Times, The Washington Post, The Atlantic, Salon, Slate, and The TLS. In 2019, Looser brought back into view a forgotten fictional pen portrait of Austen published in an 1823 issue of The Lady's Magazine.

She has made several discoveries about the Austen family's public anti-slavery activism. In 2021, she published previously unknown facts about its complicated relationship to slavery and anti-slavery, which revealed that Jane Austen's brother, Henry Thomas Austen, had been a delegate to the 1840 World Anti-Slavery Convention. Her 2022 essay on Jane Austen's naval brother Charles Austen was the first to describe his complicated history of policing the slave trade in the 1820s. In 2024, Looser published an essay on Jane Austen's other naval brother, Francis Austen, and his previously unknown leadership role in advocating for an 1826 local parliamentary petition, calling for an end the institution of slavery in the British colonies.

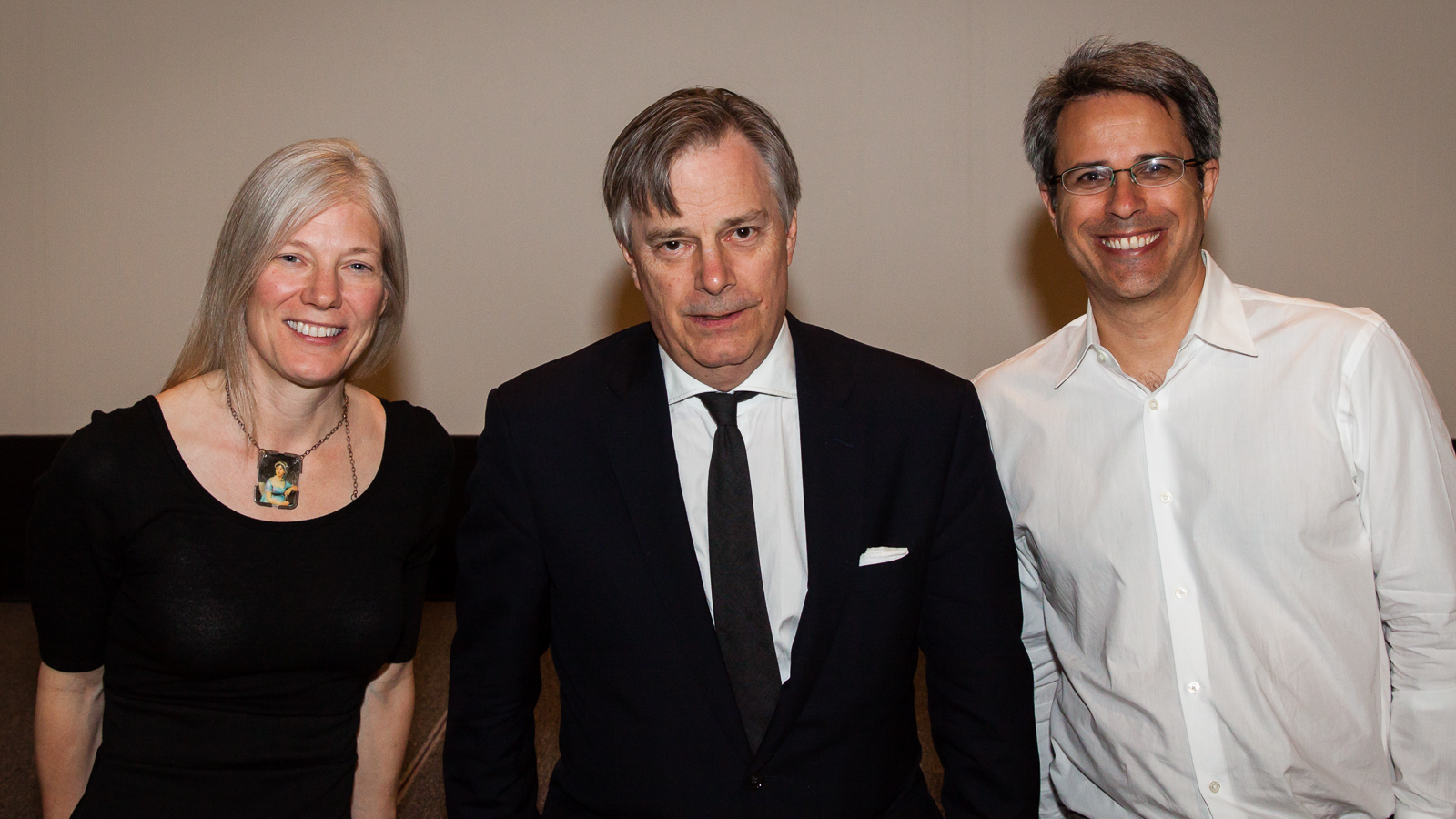
Looser with Kevin Sandler and Whit Stillman after a screening of his 1990 film Metropolitan.

Looser has done lectures on Jane Austen for The Great Courses.

== Recognition ==
In 2018, Looser was awarded a Guggenheim Fellowship and a National Endowment for the Humanities Public Scholar award to research the sisters Jane and Anna Maria Porter.

== Bibliography ==
- Looser, Devoney (2022). Sister Novelists: The Trailblazing Porter Sisters, Who Paved the Way for Austen and the Brontës. New York: Bloomsbury US.
- Looser, Devoney, ed. (2021). The Life and Works of Jane Austen. Chantilly, VA: Great Courses.
- Looser, Devoney, ed. (2019). The Daily Jane Austen: A Year of Quotes. Chicago: University of Chicago Press.
- Looser, Devoney, ed. (2019). Jane Austen's Sense and Sensibility (1811). New York: Penguin Random House.
- West, Jane (2015). Devoney Looser; Melinda O'Connell; Caitlin Kelly (eds.). A Gossip's Story, and A Legendary Tale (1796). Charlottesville, VA: Valancourt Books. ISBN 9781943910151.* Looser, Devoney (2017). The Making of Jane Austen. Baltimore, MD: Johns Hopkins University Press. doi:10.1353/book.51997. ISBN 9781421422824.
- Looser, Devoney, ed. (2015). Cambridge Companion to Women's Writing in the Romantic Period. Cambridge Companions to Literature. Cambridge: Cambridge University Press. doi:10.1017/CCO9781139061315. ISBN 9781139061315. S2CID 150938469.
- Looser, Devoney (2008). Women Writers and Old Age in Great Britain, 1750–1850. Baltimore, MD: Johns Hopkins University Press. doi:10.1353/book.3466. ISBN 9780801887055.
- Looser, Devoney (2001). British Women Writers and the Writing of History, 1670–1820. Baltimore, MD: Johns Hopkins University Press. doi:10.56021/9780801864483. ISBN 9780801876400.
- Looser, Devoney, ed. (1997). Generations: Academic Feminists in Dialogue. Minneapolis: University of Minnesota Press.
- Looser, Devoney, ed. (1995). Jane Austen and Discourses of Feminism. New York: Palgrave Macmillan.
