= Pembroke =

Pembroke may refer to:

== Places ==
=== Australia ===
- Electoral division of Pembroke, an electoral division in Tasmania
- Pembroke Land District, formerly Pembroke County, Tasmania

=== Bermuda ===
- Pembroke Parish

=== Canada ===
- Pembroke, West Hants, Nova Scotia
- Pembroke, Yarmouth County, Nova Scotia
- Pembroke, Ontario

=== Republic of Ireland ===
- Pembroke, Dublin, a former township that is now part of the city of Dublin

=== Malta ===
- Pembroke, Malta

=== New Zealand ===
- Pembroke, the former name of Wānaka in Central Otago
- Pembroke, New Zealand, a settlement northwest of Stratford, Taranaki
- Mount Pembroke, a mountain in Fiordland

=== United States ===
- Pembroke, Georgia
- Pembroke, Kentucky
- Pembroke, Maine
- Pembroke, Massachusetts
  - North Pembroke, Massachusetts
- Pembroke, New Hampshire
- Pembroke, New York
- Pembroke, North Carolina
- Pembroke, Virginia
- Pembroke Manor, Virginia, subdivision of Virginia Beach
- Pembroke Park, Florida
- Pembroke Pines, Florida
- Pembroke Township, Kankakee County, Illinois

=== Wales ===
- Pembroke, Pembrokeshire, a town in southwest Wales
- Pembroke Dock, a town in southwest Wales
- Pembrokeshire, a county in southwest Wales
- Pembrokeshire Coast National Park, a national park in southwest Wales

== Institutions ==
- Pembroke College, Cambridge
- Pembroke College, Oxford
- Pembroke College in Brown University
- Pembroke School, Adelaide, a school in South Australia
- Pembroke School, Pembrokeshire, Wales
- University of North Carolina at Pembroke
- Pembroke House of Kearsney College in South Africa

== Others ==
- Earl of Pembroke
- Fort Pembroke, a polygonal fort in Malta
- HMS Pembroke, the name of eight ships of the Royal Navy
- Pembroke (novel), an 1894 novel by Mary E. Wilkins Freeman
- Pembroke Battery, a former battery in Malta
- Pembroke Castle, Wales
- Pembroke cattle
- Pembroke Players, a student drama society at the Cambridge University
- Pembroke Power Station, Wales
- Pembroke RFC, a rugby football club
- Pembroke Lea Thom (died 1901), American politician from Maryland
- Pembroke Welsh Corgi, a breed of dog
- Percival Pembroke, an aircraft
