= Pembroke, Kentucky =

- City
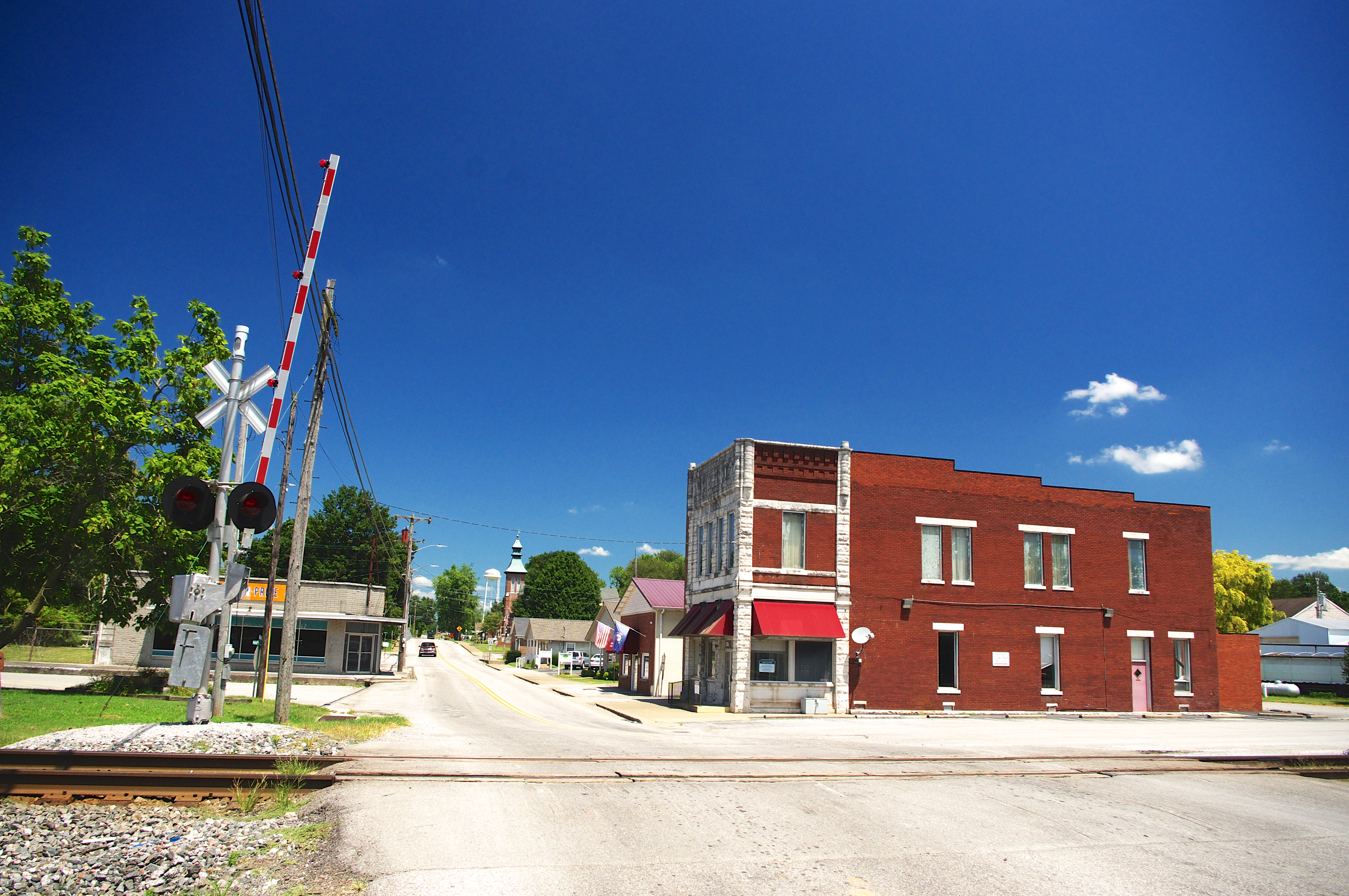
- Main Street (KY 115)

- Location of Pembroke in Christian County, Kentucky.
- Coordinates: 36°46′29″N 87°21′23″W
- Country: United States
- State: Kentucky
- County: Christian
- Incorporated: 1869
- Named for: a literary character

Area
  - Total: 1.12 sq mi (2.89 km^{2})
  - Land: 1.11 sq mi (2.88 km^{2})
  - Water: 0.0039 sq mi (0.01 km^{2})
- Elevation: 587 ft (179 m)

Population (2020)
  - Total: 865
  - Density: 778.9/sq mi (300.74/km^{2})
- Time zone: UTC-6 (Central (CST))
  - Summer (DST): UTC-5 (CDT)
- ZIP code: 42266
- Area codes: 270 & 364
- FIPS code: 21-59934
- GNIS feature ID: 0500368

Pembroke is a home rule-class city in Christian County, Kentucky, in the United States. The population was 865 as of the 2020 census, stagnant from 869 as of the 2010 U.S. census. It is part of the Clarksville, Tennessee metropolitan area.

== History ==
The town was settled in 1836 and named for Pembroke Somerset, Esq., a character in Jane Porter's 1803 novel Thaddeus of Warsaw, by Dr. Lunsford Lindsay, a local store owner. It was incorporated as a city in 1869.

== Geography ==
Pembroke is located in eastern Christian County at 36°46′29″N 87°21′23″W (36.774633, -87.356361). U.S. Route 41 passes through the town as Nashville Street, leading northwest 9 miles (14 km) to Hopkinsville, the county seat, and southeast 14 miles (23 km) to Guthrie at the Tennessee border.

According to the United States Census Bureau, Pembroke has a total area of 1.1 square miles (2.9 km^{2}), of which 0.004 square miles (0.01 km^{2}), or 0.42%, is water.

== Demographics ==
Historical population
Census	Pop.	Note	%±
1870	278		—
1880	202		−27.3%
1890	466		130.7%
1900	654		40.3%
1910	731		11.8%
1920	685		−6.3%
1930	775		13.1%
1940	570		−26.5%
1950	531		−6.8%
1960	517		−2.6%
1970	634		22.6%
1980	636		0.3%
1990	640		0.6%
2000	797		24.5%
2010	869		9.0%
2020	865		−0.5%
U.S. Decennial Census

As of the census of 2000, there were 797 people, 305 households, and 214 families residing in the city. The population density was 772.4 inhabitants per square mile (298.2/km^{2}). There were 328 housing units at an average density of 317.9 per square mile (122.7/km^{2}). The racial makeup of the city was 64.87% White, 31.12% African American, 0.50% Native American or Alaska Native, 0.25% Asian, 0.75% from other races, and 2.51% from two or more races. Hispanics or Latinos of any race were 1.25% of the population.

There were 305 households, out of which 36.1% had children under the age of 18 living with them, 48.2% were married couples living together, 18.4% had a female householder with no husband present, and 29.8% were non-families. 26.2% of all households were made up of individuals, and 11.5% had someone living alone who was 65 years of age or older. The average household size was 2.45 and the average family size was 2.95.

The age distribution was 25.7% under the age of 18, 10.4% from 18 to 24, 24.8% from 25 to 44, 20.5% from 45 to 64, and 18.6% who were 65 years of age or older. The median age was 37 years. For every 100 females, there were 81.5 males. For every 100 females age 18 and over, there were 72.1 males.

The median income for a household in the city was $27,143, and the median income for a family was $30,568. Males had a median income of $28,250 versus $18,194 for females. The per capita income for the city was $13,663. About 20.5% of families and 24.0% of the population were below the poverty line, including 32.1% of those under age 18 and 21.4% of those age 65 or over.

== See also ==
- Other places named Pembroke
