= Thaddeus of Warsaw =

1803 novel by Jane Porter

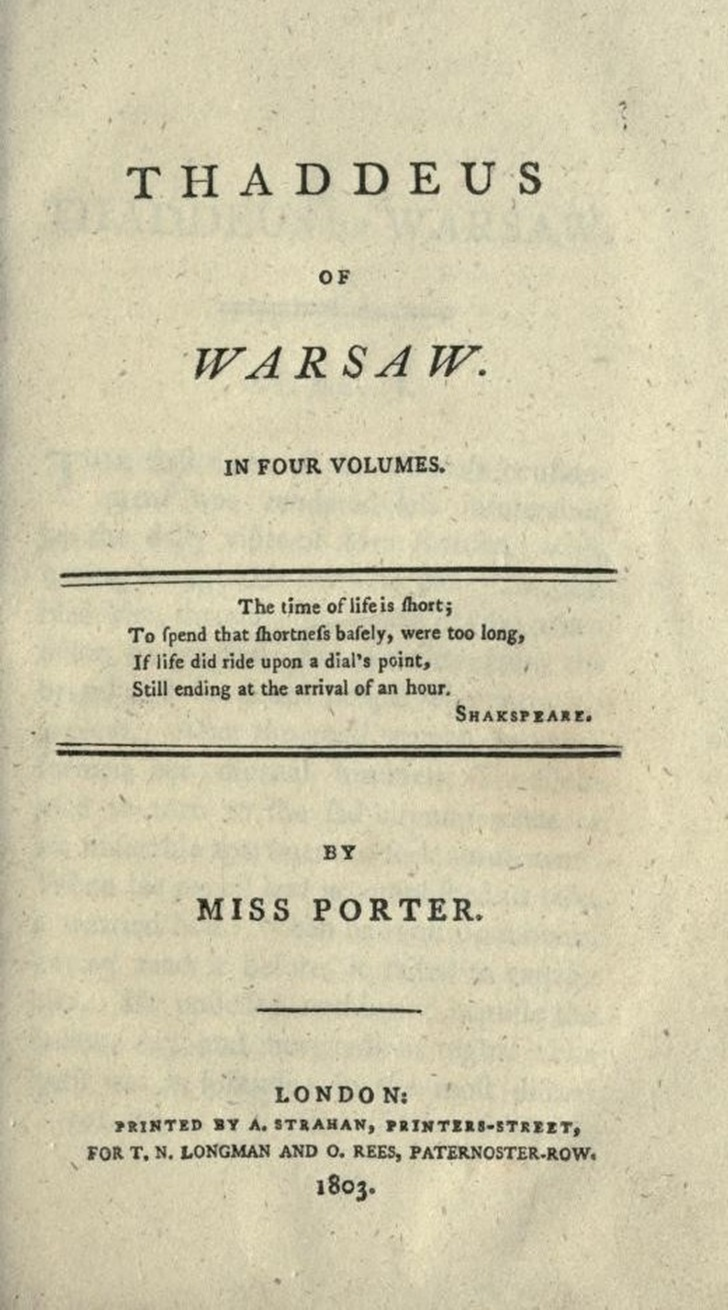
- Title page of first edition
- Author: Jane Porter
- Publication date: 1803
- Publication place: United Kingdom

Thaddeus of Warsaw is an 1803 novel written by Jane Porter and originally published in four volumes. The novel concerns Thaddeus Sobieski, a gallant young soldier who serves in the Kościuszko Uprising against invading Russian forces. After Poland's defeat, Thaddeus departs for London in search of his English father. The novel was a popular success, remaining in print throughout the nineteenth century.

== Plot ==
The work is a hybrid: the first third relates developments and battles within Poland, the remainder of the book serves as a novel of manners describing how Thaddeus, having befriended a British soldier in the Russian army and learned from his mother that he himself is half English, flees to London to begin a new life. He sells art, falls in love, and finds (and restores the honor of) his long-lost father. The story was supposedly derived from Porter's eyewitness accounts of British soldiers and Polish refugees fleeing the failed revolts after the foreign occupation of Poland-Lithuania in the 1790s. Porter wrote that her goal was "to exhibit so truly heroic and enduring a portrait of what every Christian man ought to be"; she felt obliged to look at the past and to Poland because such people were "extinct" within Britain in her time. Written during a lull in the Napoleonic Wars, Thaddeus of Warsaw includes numerous speeches and scenes arguing for a spirited defense of constitutional government against absolutism and criticizes the perceived dilettantism of the English aristocracy.

== Reception ==
Thaddeus of Warsaw went through at least 84 editions, including translations into French and German. The German edition was praised by Tadeusz Kościuszko, the inspiration for the "Thaddeus" of the title and a hero of the American Revolution, and earned Porter a ladyship from the King of Württemberg. The book was responsible for the name of Warsaw, North Carolina (founded c. 1838). The character of Thaddeus Sobieski was the namesake of Thaddeus Lowe (born 1832), the father of aerial reconnaissance in the United States, and Pembroke Somerset was the namesake of Pembroke, Kentucky (established 1836). Porter came to be so disregarded that the editor of an 1897 edition of Porter's diary took it for granted that her readers would not have heard of her and a 1905 edition of Thaddeus was published as part of a series on Half-Forgotten Books.

It was thought by Olga S. Phillips (1940), author of Isaac Nathan's biography, that the character of Thaddeus was based on Nathan's father Menachem Mona Polack (Moses Monash the Pole) who was thought to be the illegitimate son of King Stanisław August Poniatowski and his Jewish mistress Elżbieta Szydłowska. Phillips claims that Jane Porter used to call Isaac Nathan 'Thaddeus' when touching his face as a child.

== Author's fate ==
Despite the work's success, Porter was described as "totally destitute or nearly so", was obliged to circulate among her friends as a houseguest, and repeatedly petitioned the government for a literary pension (denied in part because she was unable to gather the support of other important literary figures). This penury arose because the rights to Thaddeus and her other stories were – after protracted litigation – no longer held by Porter but belonged to her various publishers, including Owen Rees, Richard Bentley, and George Virtue. Issuing "improved" and "corrected" versions with prefaces and other errata permitted her to keep some income from works.
