= The Scottish Chiefs =

1810 novel

- 1921 edition of the novel
- Author: Jane Porter
- Language: English
- Genre: Historical novel
- Publisher: Longman, Hurst, Rees, and Orme
- Publication date: 1810
- Publication place: United Kingdom
- Media type: Print

The Scottish Chiefs is an 1810 historical novel written by the British novelist Jane Porter. It is set against the backdrop of the Anglo-Scottish Wars of the late thirteenth and early fourteenth century and revolves around William Wallace. The English Porter had lived in Edinburgh for a while and was acquainted with Walter Scott, a pivotal figure in Romanticism and the revival of interest in Scottish history during the Regency era. The book was a bestseller and predates the enormous success of Scott's own Waverley novels. Its theme of national resistance to tyranny coincided with the Peninsular War and the role of Highland soldiers of the British Army in fighting the French invaders. Stylistically it has also been linked to Gothic literature.

== Bibliography ==
- Devine, Thomas Martin. Scotland's Empire and the Shaping of the Americas, 1600-1815. Smithsonian Books, 2004.
- Garside, Peter, Raven, James & Schöwerling, Rainer. The English Novel, 1770-1829. Oxford University Press, 2000.
- Kasmer, Lisa. Novel Histories: British Women Writing History, 1760-1830. Bloomsbury Publishing, 2012.
