= Irene Schroeder =

American murderer (1909–1931)

Irene Schroeder (February 17, 1909 – February 23, 1931) was an American criminal who became the first woman to be electrocuted in Pennsylvania and the fourth woman to be executed by electrocution in the United States. She was given several nicknames by the press, including "Trigger Woman," "Iron Irene," "Irene of the six-shooters," "animal woman", "the blonde tiger," "the blonde bandit," and "Tiger Girl."

== Early life ==
Schroeder (née Crawford) was born in 1909 in Benwood, West Virginia. At the age of 15, she married Homer Shrader, and they had a son, Donnie, a year later. She soon left Homer and became a waitress in Wheeling, West Virginia. There, she met Walter Glenn Dague, who became her lover.

== Shootout in Butler, Pennsylvania ==
On December 27, 1929, she and Dague as well as her older brother, Tom Crawford, were involved in a grocery store robbery in Butler, Pennsylvania. While escaping the scene of the crime, they were stopped by two police officers, Brady Paul and Ernest Moore. A shootout ensued. Paul was fatally shot, and Moore was wounded. Shrader, Crawford, and Dague all escaped and went into hiding, leaving Irene's four-year-old son, who had been in the car at the time, with a family member. Irene changed the spelling of her name to Schroeder to muddy the trail that the police were following.

Donnie was soon interviewed by the police, and his testimony was later used to help convict his mother. He stated:

"I saw my mama shoot a cop. Uncle Tom shot another one in the head. He shot right through the windshield."

== Arrest and trial ==
Tom Crawford was never arrested; the police believed that he was killed in a shootout after a robbery in Texas. After a long manhunt, Dague and Schroeder were both apprehended after a shootout in Arizona. They were tried in Pennsylvania and sentenced to death by electrocution. Schroeder was the first female to be executed in such a way in Pennsylvania.

Schroeder was electrocuted at SCI Rockview (Pennsylvania) on February 23, 1931, at 7:05 a.m., wearing "a gray dress of imitation silk with white collars and cuffs, beige silk stockings and black satin slippers" to her death. Her executioner Robert G. Elliott remarked that she seemed particularly "composed and fearless." Her parting words to her six-year-old son, Donnie were "I am going to die, my boy, but I am not afraid. Be a good boy and don't be afraid." Donnie was heard to remark, "I'll bet my mom would make an awful nice angel." Dague was executed the same day.
