= Francis Crowley =

American murderer (1912–1932)

- Born: October 31, 1912; New York City, U.S.
- Died: January 21, 1932 (aged 19); Sing Sing Prison, New York, U.S.
- Other names: Two Gun; Tommy Jordan
- Status: Executed by electrocution
- Motive: Resisting arrest
- Conviction: First degree murder (1931)
- Penalty: Death

Details
- Killed: 1 directly, 1 by accomplice
- Injured: 4

Francis "Two Gun" Crowley (October 31, 1912 – January 21, 1932) was an American murderer. His crime spree lasted nearly three months, ending in a two-hour shootout with the New York City Police Department on May 7, 1931 that was witnessed by 15,000 bystanders and received national attention. In 1932, he was executed on the electric chair of Sing Sing Prison. His story was referenced in Dale Carnegie's How to Win Friends and Influence People.

== Early life ==
Crowley was born in New York City on October 31, 1912, the second son of an unwed German mother who gave him up for adoption. His grandfather was a police officer, and he was raised by a woman who took him in as an orphan. Crowley only had a third grade education, and was "almost unable to read" and could barely write. By his late teens, he had a reputation as a troubled youth with a criminal history.

== Crime spree ==
On February 21, 1931, Crowley and two other young men crashed a dance hosted by the American Legion in the Bronx. After several Legionnaires tried to remove them from the venue, Crowley drew a gun and wounded two men before fleeing. He was charged with attempted murder and went into hiding. He was confronted by police on March 13 and escaped into an office building on Lexington Avenue after shooting Detective Ferdinand Schaedel. Two days later, Crowley and four others robbed a bank in New Rochelle, New York.

A month later, Crowley and two friends broke into the West 90th Street apartment of real estate broker Rudolph Adler. Adler attempted to resist them, and Crowley shot him five times using two pistols, which earned him the nickname "Two Gun". Adler's dog Trixie attacked the robbers and drove them from the house, saving her owner's life, before being shot by one of Crowley's accomplices as the gang exited the apartment.

On April 27, Crowley was out joyriding in a stolen vehicle with his partner Rudolph "Fats" Durringer and dance hall hostess Virginia Brannen. Brannen resisted Durringer's advances, so Durringer shot and killed her while still in the car. Crowley then helped him dump her body at St. Joseph's Seminary in Yonkers. New York City police found Brannen's body and escalated their efforts to find Crowley.

On April 29, he was spotted in the Bronx driving a green Chrysler Imperial sedan along 138th Street near the Morris Avenue Bridge. Police pursued him, but he escaped after a running gun battle. Detectives found that the bullets extracted from a police car matched those that killed Virginia Brannen as well as other unsolved shootings. The following day, Crowley's car was found abandoned with bullet holes and bloodstains on the inside. On May 6, Crowley was sitting in a parked car with his 16-year-old girlfriend Helen Walsh on Morris Lane in North Merrick, Long Island, when he was approached by police officers Frederick Hirsch and Peter Yodice, who asked for identification. Crowley fired at them, killing Hirsch and wounding Yodice. He then sped off.

== Capture ==
The following day, Crowley, Walsh, and Durringer were tracked down to a fifth-floor apartment in a rooming house on West 91st Street. The residence belonged to a former lover of Crowley's, who notified the police upon seeing him with another woman. Outside the building, a force of 300 police officers armed with rifles, machine guns, and tear gas assembled. The events attracted 15,000 bystanders.

Crowley and the police exchanged gunfire for nearly two hours, with the police firing an estimated 700 rounds into the building. While Walsh and Durringer reloaded Crowley's pistols, Crowley threw back several tear gas grenades that the police had thrown into the apartment through a hole cut into the roof. After suffering four gunshot wounds and bleeding heavily, he finally surrendered. Arresting officers found two pistols strapped to his legs.

== Trial and execution ==
On May 29, less than three weeks after his arrest, Crowley was tried and convicted of the murder of police officer Frederick Hirsch. His partner, Fats Durringer, was found guilty of the murder of Virginia Brannen. Both men were sentenced to death in the electric chair on June 1.

Crowley spent his last year on death row at Sing Sing Prison in Ossining, New York. He remained a disciplinary problem – stuffing his prison uniform down a toilet, setting fire to his bed, and frequently crafting homemade weapons. His attitude became somewhat more serene as his execution neared: he reportedly adopted a starling that frequently flew into his cell.

On January 21, 1932, Crowley's last words to Warden Lewis Lawes were to ask for a rag. Referring to Durringer's death in the same electric chair, Crowley said, "I want to wipe off the chair after this rat sat in it." It is not clear if the request was granted.

Crowley was 19 when he was executed.

== See also ==
- Capital punishment in New York
- List of people executed in New York
- List of people executed in the United States in 1932
