= Jane Porter (English novelist) =

English novelist and dramatist (1776–1850)

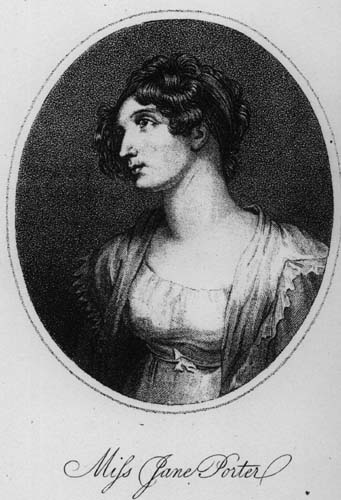
- Jane Porter, from The Ladies' Monthly Museum
- Born: 17 January 1776; Durham, England
- Died: 24 May 1850 (aged 74); Bristol, England
- Occupation: Novelist
- Writing career
- Period: 1803–1840
- Genre: Historical fiction
- Subject: Historical documentary
- Notable work: The Scottish Chiefs

Jane Porter (3 December 1775 – 24 May 1850) was an English historical novelist, dramatist and literary figure. Her bestselling novels, Thaddeus of Warsaw (1803) and The Scottish Chiefs (1810) are seen as among the earliest historical novels in a modern style and among the first to become bestsellers. They were abridged and remained popular among children well into the twentieth century.

== Life ==
Jane Porter was born in Durham, England, the third of five children of the Irishman William Porter and Jane Blenkinsop Porter of Durham. Tall and beautiful as she grew up, young Jane Porter's grave air earned her the nickname La Penserosa after John Milton's poem Il Penseroso. After her father's death, Jane's family moved to Edinburgh, where she studied at a charity school under the schoolmaster George Fulton. Her family was acquainted with Sir Walter Scott. After stints in Durham and Ireland, the Porter family moved to London in the 1790s, where the sisters entered a circle of famous and future-famous actors, artists, and literary women, including Elizabeth Inchbald, Anna Laetitia Barbauld, Hannah More, Elizabeth Hamilton, Selina Davenport, Elizabeth Benger and Mrs Champion de Crespigny.

Porter's siblings also achieved great fame. Her sister Anna Maria Porter was a bestselling and prolific novelist. Her brother Sir Robert Ker Porter became a celebrated panoramic painter.

She died in Bristol at the age of 74.

== Works ==
Porter is seen to have "crafted and pioneered many of the narrative tools most commonly associated with both the national tale and the historical novel," though her claims in her lifetime to have done so were often ridiculed and dismissed. Her 1810 work The Scottish Chiefs, about William Wallace, one of the earliest examples of the historical novel, was very successful. The French version was banned by Napoleon. It was said to have influenced Scott and other writers and has remained popular with Scottish children. The Pastor's Fireside (1817) was a story set in the 18th century about the later members of the House of Stuart. Though one of the most popular writers of her time, the profligacy and poor financial decisions of her brothers kept her destitute, as she and Anna Maria were constantly obliged to use their incomes to pay off their brothers' debts.

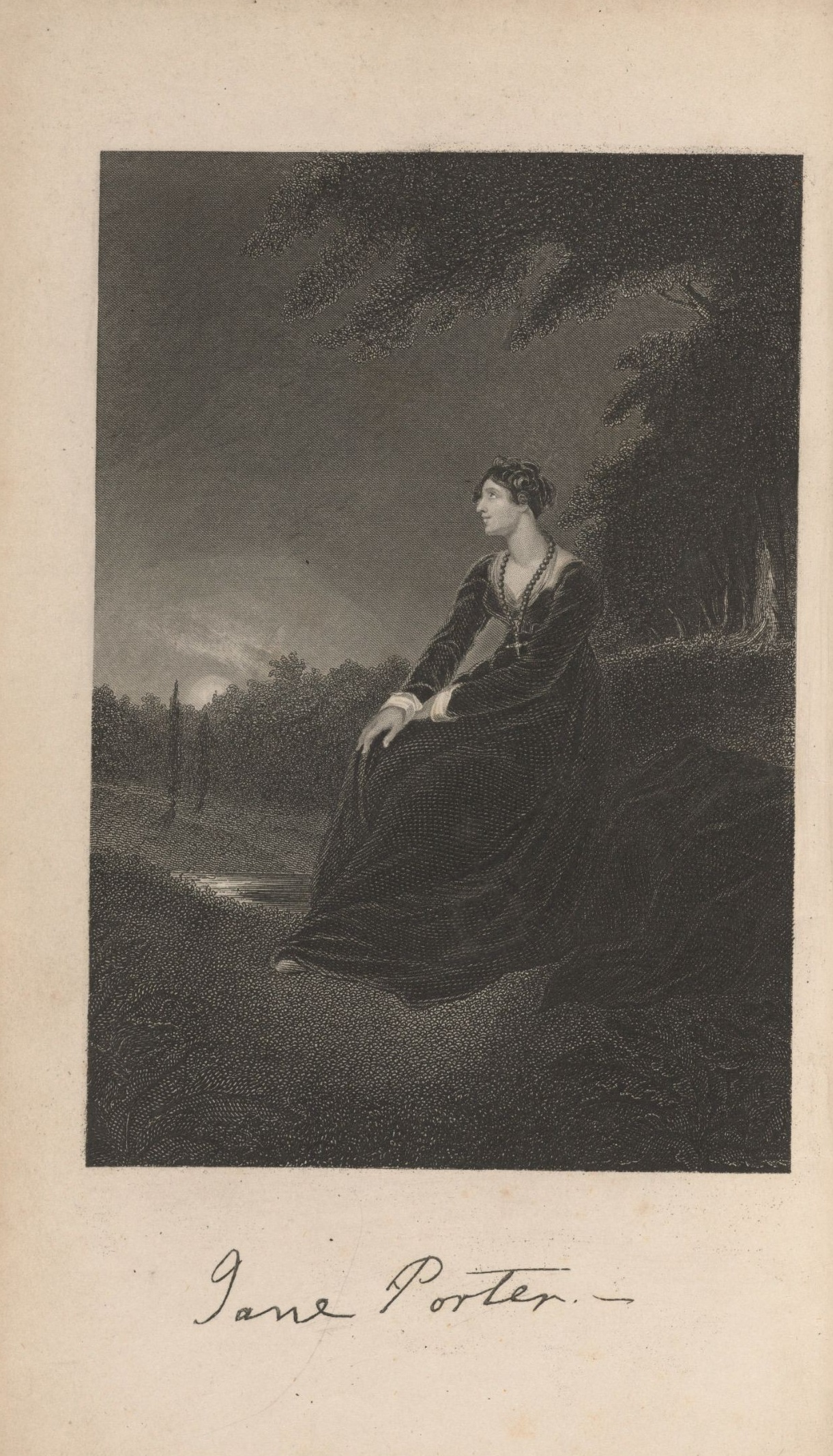
Engraving of the author from an 1846 edition of The Pastor's Fireside

Porter wrote Thaddeus of Warsaw in 1803, set in the late 18th century Polish–Lithuanian Commonwealth. Despite its success, Porter did not benefit financially, as its copyright was held by its various publishers. To gain income from it, she resorted to ostensibly new editions published with prefaces and minor changes. She applied unsuccessfully for a literary pension, and being personally "totally destitute or nearly so", had to move between homes of her friends.

Porter contributed to periodicals and wrote the play Switzerland (1819), which seems to have been deliberately sabotaged by its lead, Edmund Kean, and closed after its first performance. She is sometimes associated with the 1822 production Owen, Prince of Powys, which closed after only three performances, but this was actually by Samson Penley.

Porter also wrote Tales Round a Winter Hearth (1826) and Coming Out; and The Field of Forty Footsteps (1828) with her sister, Anna Maria. In her later years, Porter continued to write pieces for journals. Many appeared anonymously or were simply signed "J. P." Her wide-ranging topics included Peter the Great, Simón Bolívar, and the African explorer Dixon Denham.

=== Sir Edward Seaward's Diary ===
A romance, Sir Edward Seaward's Diary (1831), purporting to record actual circumstances and edited by Jane, was written by her brother, Dr William Ogilvie Porter, as letters in the University of Durham Porter archives show.

== Influences ==
Porter, like many contemporaries, was fascinated by Lord Byron. The villain in The Pastor's Fireside, Duke Wharton, has been said to cast "an unmistakably Byronic shadow". Additional influences on her writing included her schoolmaster George Fulton, Edmund Spenser's The Faerie Queene and Sir Philip Sidney's Arcadia. She in turn influenced writers in her time.

== Works ==
- The Two Princes of Persia, Addressed to Youth (1801)
- Thaddeus of Warsaw (1803)
- A Sketch of the Campaign of Count A. Suwarrow Ryminski (1804)
- The Scottish Chiefs (1810)
- The Pastor's Fire-Side: A Novel (1817)
- Switzerland (1819)
- Owen, Prince of Powys (1822)
- Duke Christian of Lüneburg (1824)

With Anna Maria Porter:

- Tales Round a Winter Hearth (1826)
- Coming Out (1828)
- The Field of Forty Footsteps (1828)

== Literature ==
- Devoney Looser. Sister Novelists: The Trailblazing Porter Sisters, Who Paved the Way for Austen and the Brontës, New York; London; Oxford; New Delhi; Sydney: Bloomsbury Publishing, 2022, ISBN 978-1-63557-529-3
