= Walter Holmes =

Walter Holmes (February 3, 1900 – April 29, 1932) was a murderer who was executed in Kentucky's electric chair. His death drew attention since he had violently resisted his execution. He also stabbed a prison guard with a homemade knife the day before his execution.

== Crime and arrest ==
Holmes, a black man originally from Chicago, Illinois, murdered a farmer, 55-year-old Thomas Tillery, on April 3, 1931, by shooting him with two accomplices, Walter Dewberry and Charles Rodgers. The trio had been on a crime spree across Kentucky committing a series of robberies and assaults in Louisville, Fulton County, and some sections of southern Illinois. When first apprehended, they tried to claim that the three of them committed a robbery while an unknown man fired the shot that murdered Tillery, but no such man was ever found, and only Holmes, Rodgers, and Dewberry went to court.

== Trial ==
The trial began on April 28, 1931, amid great racial tension. Dewberry's black attorney was beaten by a mob that felt angered by Dewberry's choice of a black civil rights attorney over a white court-appointed attorney; Dewberry's attorney requested a change of venue because of the violent atmosphere, but this was denied, and on May 3, 1931, Holmes, Dewberry, and Rodgers all received death sentences for their crimes.

The executions of the three convicts were scheduled for April 29, 1932, but Dewberry was given a stay of execution, so on that date, only Holmes and Rodgers were executed.

== Execution ==
Walter Holmes was 31 years old when he was executed on the same night as his accomplice, 23-year-old Charles Rodgers, and another man, 23-year-old A.B. Cooksey, who was put to death for a completely unrelated murder of Police Chief John Ashby from Madisonville. The executions took place in the Kentucky State Penitentiary in Eddyville, where Kentucky's electric chair was located.

While Cooksey and Rodgers were described as having gone to their deaths calmly and without incidence, Holmes did not. The day before the execution, Holmes had caused trouble for prison staff; he stabbed a guard with a homemade knife. On the day of the execution, after Cooksey and Rodgers had been executed, when guards went to Holmes's cell to take him to the execution chamber, he threw water on them. Then he brandished an iron pipe that he had broken off of a water pipeline and threatened the guards with it. After 90 minutes, the warden ordered the guards to throw tear gas bombs at Holmes. After three were used, Holmes surrendered and left his cell, smoking a cigarette.

Dewberry was eventually executed in the same electric chair over a year later, on November 10, 1933.

== See also ==
- Capital punishment in Kentucky
- List of people executed in Kentucky (pre-1972)
- List of people executed in the United States in 1932
