= Trinity murders =

1984 homicide by firearm of two 17-year-olds in Louisville, Kentucky, US

- Scott Nelson (left); Richard Stephenson (right)
- Date: September 29, 1984
- Location: Louisville, Kentucky, United States
- Cause: Homicide by firearm
- Outcome: Solved
- Deaths: 2
- Convicted: Victor Taylor; George Wade
- Verdict: Guilty
- Convictions: Taylor; Death; Wade; Life imprisonment

The "Trinity murders" occurred in Louisville, Kentucky, on September 29, 1984, when Victor Dewayne Taylor and George Ellis Wade kidnapped and murdered two 17-year-old Trinity High School students, Scott Christopher Nelson and Richard David Stephenson. Taylor was sentenced to death, and Wade was sentenced to life imprisonment.

== Murders ==
On the evening of Saturday, September 29, 1984, Nelson and Stephenson, described as "Caucasian", were driving to a Trinity High School football game at the DuPont Manual High School football stadium. The stadium is on East Burnett Avenue in the Schnitzelburg neighborhood of Louisville, about a mile from Manual High School, and the pair stopped in several places to ask directions. The last of these stops, at about 9 p.m., was at a Moby Dick restaurant at the intersection of Oak and Logan streets.

At the Moby Dick, the pair encountered Wade, age 23, and Taylor, 24, both described as "African-American". Both had "extensive criminal records". Taylor was on parole after serving part of a 13-year-sentence for wanton endangerment, robbery, and assault. Wade had been convicted of attempted shoplifting, shoplifting, carrying a concealed deadly weapon, and attempted third-degree burglary, and had been released from the Jefferson County Jail less than a month before.

Taylor and Wade offered to help in exchange for a ride, but Nelson and Stephenson declined. Taylor then produced a pistol, and he and Wade got into the back seats of the car. They forced Nelson, whose car it was, to drive to an alley off the 900 block of South Clay Street, where Wade searched the boys' pockets; they then tied their hands behind their backs and put them in the back seat of the car, with Taylor taking the wheel. From there, they drove to an empty lot behind an abandoned apartment building at 318 Ardella Court.

There, Taylor and Wade removed Nelson's and Stephenson's pants and shoes, then tied their ankles and gagged them: according to the state's chief medical examiner, with their socks, with neckties, and with strips of a towel. There was some evidence that Nelson was sexually assaulted. Nelson and Stephenson were each shot once in the head, at point-blank range.

== Arrests ==
Police found the bodies of Nelson and Stephenson early the next morning, Sunday, September 30. A major investigation was undertaken, involving "virtually every division of the police force". Witnesses were found to establish the victims' whereabouts throughout the course of the evening, including two who had seen the abduction at the Moby Dick.

On the afternoon of October 3, Wade was brought to the police station, where he was informed of his Miranda rights and told that he was a suspect in the murders. He waived his rights and agreed to be interviewed about the crime, denying that he had been involved. He continued to do so after failing a polygraph examination. He was then arrested for an unrelated burglary, and agreed to take part in a lineup, in which he was identified by one of the Moby Dick witnesses. Informed of this, he changed his story, stating that he and Taylor had committed the kidnapping and robbery, but that Taylor alone had made and carried out the decision to kill the students, despite Wade's attempt to dissuade him.

Taylor was arrested near his home early on the morning of October 4. A search of his mother's home produced a number of items belonging to the victims, including Nelson's pants and both pairs of shoes. Witnesses later testified that they had heard Taylor admitting to the murders.

== Trials ==
With the trial of Taylor and Wade scheduled to begin in April 1985, the defense requested a change of venue to Fayette County, arguing that publicity in the Louisville area would prejudice prospective jurors against the defendants. The trial was rescheduled for January 1986, in Lexington.

The two were to be tried together. However, days before the trial was scheduled to begin, a Jefferson Circuit judge ordered separate trials. In May 1985, Jeffrey Brown, Taylor's former cellmate, had claimed that Taylor had admitted committing the murders; but Brown had recanted his claim in November, and without evidence of such a confession by Taylor, Wade's original confession could not be used in a joint trial. Moreover, Taylor's defense had not been informed of Brown's recantation until shortly before the trial was due to begin. Wade's trial went forward, while Taylor's was rescheduled for March 1986.

At Wade's trial, he admitted that he had participated in the kidnapping and robbery, but claimed that he and Taylor had been walking away from the bound victims when Taylor, despite Wade's protests, had returned to the site and fired the fatal shots. He denied that any sexual assault had taken place, and a forensic serologist testified that the small quantity of semen found on Nelson's body might have been the victim's own, involuntarily discharged at the moment of death. After 22 hours of deliberation, the jury found Wade guilty of two counts of murder, kidnapping, and first-degree robbery, but acquitted him of sodomy. The prosecution sought a death sentence, noting that Kentucky law allowed capital punishment when someone was killed in the course of a robbery. However, the jury recommended prison sentences of life for the murders, 22 years for the kidnappings, and 15 years for the robberies, with the sentences to run concurrently. Wade was sentenced to life imprisonment.

=== Taylor's trial ===
Taylor's attorneys argued that the publicity surrounding Wade's trial would make it impossible for their client to receive a fair trial. They first requested a delay in his trial, which was denied; then, they asked that it be moved from Lexington to Danville, which was also rejected.

At the trial, detectives testified that they had found items belonging to the victims at Taylor's mother's and sister's homes.

Brown, Taylor's former cellmate, who had initially claimed to have heard Taylor admitting to the murders but recanted before Wade's trial, now reversed his recantation, saying that he had only done so because Taylor had threatened to kill his mother. He now stated that, according to what Taylor had told him, both Taylor and Wade had sodomized one of the victims, and that Taylor had killed them after Wade had called Taylor by name.

Eugene Taylor, Victor Taylor's cousin, testified that he had been at Victor's mother's home on the night of the murder, and seen Victor and Wade come in "smiling and, as I recall, laughing" with some of the victims' property; later, he said, he had overheard Victor admitting to the murder. Questioned by the defense, he admitted that he had told the police of this only after his own arrest on charges of rape, sodomy, assault, and robbery, and that those charges had been reduced soon thereafter.

The prosecution called Wade as a witness. However, Wade, whose direct appeal was pending, refused to testify, citing his Fifth Amendment right against self-incrimination. The prosecution then sought to admit the recorded statement that Wade had made shortly after the murders; the defense asked that it be excluded, since they would be unable to cross-examine Wade. The trial judge ruled that it could be admitted, under one of the exceptions to the hearsay rule.

The jury found Taylor guilty of two counts of murder, two of kidnapping, two of robbery, and one of sodomy. He was sentenced to three consecutive 20-year prison terms on the robbery and sodomy counts, and to death for the murder and kidnapping charges.

== Further litigation ==
=== Taylor v. Commonwealth (1990) ===
In 1990, Taylor's appeal reached the Kentucky Supreme Court. His counsel raised 44 allegations of error, most of which the court dismissed without discussion: "Allegations of error which we consider to be without merit will not be addressed here." Much of the court's opinion was given to the question of the prosecution's use of Wade's statement, and whether it fell under an exception to the rule against using hearsay evidence. At issue was whether the statement was contrary to Wade's penal interest: "[A] reasonable man in such a position would not have made the statement unless it was true". By a 5–2 margin, the court decided that this was the case. The dissenting Justices argued that, while Wade's statement had inculpated him in the kidnapping and robbery, it had sought to dissociate him from responsibility for the murders, and thus to escape a possible capital sentence, so was not contrary to his penal interest.

The court also considered the trial judge's refusal to grant Taylor's request for a second change of venue, noting that the motion was filed late, with insufficient time for the prosecution to rebut; they also found that the judge "took very extended precautions to insure the fairness of the jury panel". They looked more favorably on the argument that sentencing Taylor to death both for the murders themselves, and for kidnappings leading to the deaths of the victims, amounted to double jeopardy. In light of this, they vacated the two capital sentences for the kidnappings, leaving the death sentences for the murders in place.

=== Taylor v. Commonwealth (2001) ===
The Kentucky Supreme Court again considered Taylor's case in 2001, and by a 5–2 margin, declined to set aside the judgements against him. Both of the dissenting Justices, neither of whom had been on the court in 1990, argued that the admission of Wade's confession amounted to a violation of Taylor's Confrontation Clause right to cross-examine witnesses testifying against him.

One of the 2001 dissenters, Janet Stumbo, also argued that the 1990 court had erroneously dismissed one of Taylor's claims regarding jury selection. In the original trial, 37 potential jurors had qualified, 6 of whom were African-American. The defense had then been allowed 14 peremptory strikes, all of which it had exercised, in which it had eliminated one of the African-Americans. The prosecution had been given 9 peremptory strikes and had exercised 8, eliminating 4 Caucasian and 4 African-American jurors, leaving a single African-American on the jury. In his original appeal, Taylor had maintained that his right to equal protection of the law had been violated by the systematic exclusion of jurors of his race, citing the U.S. Supreme Court's ruling in Batson v. Kentucky. The 1990 court had dismissed this claim without explanation; Stumbo argued that this dismissal was an error, and one that the 2001 court should correct.

=== Taylor v. Commonwealth (2005) ===
Another appeal of Taylor's case came before the Kentucky Supreme Court in 2005. At a 1997 hearing on a motion by Taylor, Wade had recanted the statement to police in which he had identified Taylor as the other kidnapper, and as the person who had committed the killings; he now asserted that it was Eugene Taylor who had committed these offenses. Moreover, in 2004, the U.S. Supreme Court had issued its ruling in Crawford v. Washington, finding that out-of-court statements such as Wade's, which Taylor had no opportunity to cross-examine, were inadmissible under the Confrontation Clause.

The Kentucky court's majority agreed with the lower court in finding that Wade's recantation was not credible. Considering Crawford, they found that the initial trial court had been presented with overwhelming evidence of Taylor's guilt, and that the verdict would have been the same even without Wade's statement; so the admission of the statement was harmless error, and Taylor was not entitled to a new trial. Two of the Justices concurred with the decision not to grant the new trial, on the grounds that the validity of Wade's recantation was the only issue properly before the court; they declined to consider Crawford, stating "that decision will ultimately be decided by the federal courts on habeas corpus review". Justice James E. Keller, who had dissented from the 2001 opinion, did so again, and for the same reasons: "Given the magnitude of Wade's testimony, which was the only evidence that identified Taylor as the shooter in the murders, it is inconceivable that we could label its introduction as harmless error"; he called for the court to reverse and remand for a new trial.

== Aftermath ==
Mugshot of George Ellis Wade

2026 mugshot of Victor Dewayne Taylor

In 2000, the clothier Benetton ran an advertising campaign titled "We, On Death Row", which featured Taylor and 24 other death-row inmates from around the United States. The anti-capital-punishment campaign, which made no mention of the inmates' victims, led to protests, in response to which department-store chain Sears Roebuck removed Benetton clothing from their stores.

As of 2025, Taylor was on death row at the Kentucky State Penitentiary near Eddyville, Kentucky; Wade was serving a life sentence at the Luther Luckett Correctional Complex near LaGrange Kentucky.
