= Larry Lamont White =

Convicted American serial killer

- White's 2023 Mugshot
- Born: March 30, 1958 (age 68); Louisville, Kentucky, U.S.
- Other name: Larry Griffin
- Convictions: Murder (3 counts); First degree rape Possession of a firearm by a convicted felon
- Penalty: Death x1 (Armstrong); Death x2; commuted to 29 years imprisonment (Sweeney and Miles)

Details
- Victims: 3
- Span of crimes: June 4 – July 7, 1983
- Country: United States
- State: Kentucky
- Date apprehended: For the final time in 2006
- Imprisoned at: Kentucky State Penitentiary, Eddyville, Kentucky

Larry Lamont White (born March 30, 1958) is an American serial killer who fatally shot three women in Louisville, Kentucky, from June to July 1983. Originally convicted of two murders, for which he was sentenced to death, his sentence was later overturned, and White was paroled. After being imprisoned for firearm violations in 2006, he was linked to his first murder via DNA and given a new death sentence, and he is currently awaiting execution for it.

== Murders ==
On June 4, 1983, 22-year-old Pamela Armstrong went out to get food stamps from an office in downtown Louisville, where she entered an unknown man's car. About an hour later, her body was found in an alley on Beech Street by a passer-by, having been shot in the head. A motive for the shooting could not be established, as her money, driver's license, and other valuables had been left on her.

A week later, 21-year-old Yolanda Sweeney, an employee of National Processing Company, was seen leaving the "Mr. D's Inferno" nightclub in the company of an unknown black male. Two days later, her body was found in a backyard on Greenwood Avenue, and she was also shot in the head. Sweeney was naked from the waist down, and her purse had been stolen.

The final confirmed victim was found on July 7, when 22-year-old Deborah Miles' body was found by her friends in her bedroom apartment. Like the others before her, she had also been shot in the head. Due to the similarity of the murders, all of which had occurred in a little over a month, city police started suspecting that the homicides might be connected. However, at the time, they considered that Armstrong's murder was unrelated to the others due to differing circumstances and instead thought it was related to the murder of a 23-year-old woman named Andrea T. Williams, who was found shot to death on July 1. The cases proved difficult to solve initially, as little physical evidence pointed towards any suspects.

== Arrest, trial and sentence ==
On August 9, White was arrested by police and charged with the murders of Sweeney and Miles and the attempted murder of a 30-year-old woman he had encountered near the Dixie Highway on March 15. In the latter incident, he threatened the woman at gunpoint into his car, after which he drove to Dumesnil Street, where he sexually assaulted and robbed her of $3.50 and a bucket of chicken she had ordered from a fast food restaurant. For these crimes, he was charged with murder, first-degree robbery, first-degree burglary, and unlawful imprisonment. Another woman, Bernice Adams, would also come forward and accuse him of attacking her in her home on June 28 - in that, White, using the alias "Larry Griffin," was allowed to enter to use the telephone ostensibly, but then threatened her with a gun. Before he could do anything to her, however, Adams managed to lock herself in her bathroom, prompting him to leave.

During the months-long trial, prosecutors presented evidence overwhelmingly pointing towards White's guilt, including his pawned .38 S&W, whose bullets matched those used in the killings, and clothes stained with blood later identified as Sweeney's. Furthermore, prosecutors also pointed out that White had been convicted of sexual assault the year before the murders, as well as his willing confessions to both murders. Due to this, he was quickly found guilty by jury verdict. In an attempt to bring about a lighter sentence for his client, White's attorney, Ray Clooney, said that his client had been heavily intoxicated and on drugs when he committed the murders, which he considered mitigating circumstances worthy of a 25-year-to-life sentence. This request was denied, and White was officially sentenced to death for the two murders, despite his lawyer's last-minute insistence on a new trial.

=== Overturn of sentence ===
A little over two years into his death sentence, White's sentence was overturned as a result of a ruling from the Supreme Court, which stated that offenders could not be questioned about a case without the presence of a lawyer if they have pending arraignments on other charges. This decision was heavily criticized by prosecutors and law enforcement alike, who pointed out that it would make it much harder to obtain confessions from suspects in violent crimes, and it might mean that White could be paroled.

The case was complicated further by how White's confession was deemed illegal, and questions began to arise about whether the gun could be used as evidence in court. In the end, the confession was scrapped altogether, allowing White to plead guilty and lessen his sentence to 29 years imprisonment with a chance of parole, with him being released in 2001.

== New charges ==
Following his release, White would be repeatedly arrested for misdemeanors, including drunk driving, possessing marijuana, and attempted theft. In 2006, he was convicted and sentenced to 15 years imprisonment for possessing a firearm, violating his parole conditions since he was a convicted felon. He was sent back to prison with a scheduled release date sometime in 2016. However, a year later, he would be linked via DNA evidence to Armstrong's murder and was subsequently charged with it.

At his new trial, prosecutors were allowed to present evidence from his previous murders to establish a correlation between all three killings. Despite his attorney's protests on the verdict, White was found guilty and sentenced to death for Armstrong's murder. He refused to attend the sentencing and instead remained in jail during the process. Since his incarceration, White and his attorneys have repeatedly attempted to commute his sentence on intellectual disability grounds but have been unsuccessful so far, as both of his appeals were rejected by the Kentucky Supreme Court.

== See also ==
- Beoria Simmons
- Cleo Joel Green
- Capital punishment in Kentucky
- List of death row inmates in the United States § Kentucky
- List of serial killers in the United States
