= Old Eddyville Historic District =

Historic district in Kentucky, United States

- U.S. National Register of Historic Places
- U.S. Historic district
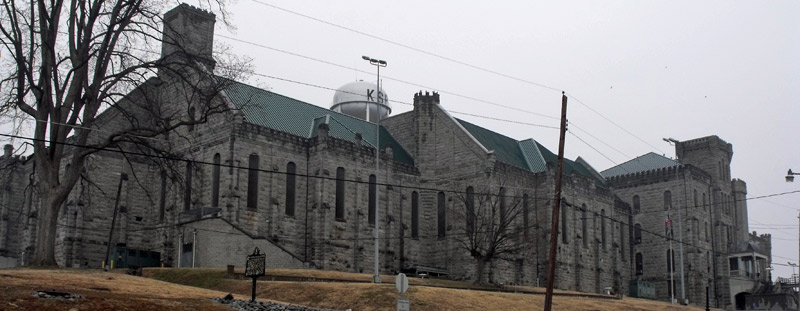

- Location within Kentucky Location within the United States
- Location: Off KY 730, Eddyville, Kentucky
- Coordinates: 37°02′52″N 88°04′34″W
- Area: 11 acres (4.5 ha)
- Built by: McDonald Bros.
- Architectural style: Greek Revival, Romanesque
- NRHP reference No.: 81000285
- Added to NRHP: April 30, 1981

The Old Eddyville Historic District, located off KY 730 in Eddyville, Kentucky, is an 11 acres (4.5 ha) historic district which was listed on the National Register of Historic Places in 1981. It included 13 contributing buildings.

It includes the surviving portion of the original town of Eddyville, "one of western Kentucky's earliest and most important settlements", after the majority of the town was flooded by the 1966 damming (flooding) of the Cumberland River at Barkley Dam. It includes the Kentucky State Penitentiary and nine historic buildings at its base.
