= List of people executed in Kentucky =

This is a list of people executed in Kentucky. Since the reinstatement of capital punishment in the United States in 1976, three people have been executed in Kentucky. All three were executed for murder. All of the executions occurred at the Kentucky State Penitentiary (KSP) in Eddyville.

Harold McQueen Jr. has been the only person executed by the Commonwealth of Kentucky involuntarily since 1976. Edward Lee Harper Jr. and Marco Allen Chapman both volunteered to be executed. Harper dropped his remaining appeals while Chapman waived all non-statutory appeals during initial sentencing. (According to the Kentucky Revised Statutes, all sentences of death in Kentucky must be reviewed and affirmed by the Kentucky Supreme Court before they are carried out.)

Another execution of note in Kentucky was that of Rainey Bethea. Bethea was executed by hanging on August 14, 1936, for the rape of 70-year-old Lischia Edwards. He had also confessed to her murder by strangling but the Commonwealth indicted him only on the rape charge since that was the only capital crime for which the penalty was public hanging. Had Bethea been convicted and sentenced to death for murder (even with an additional rape conviction), the law as it was written at the time would have required Bethea to have been transported to Eddyville and executed in KSP's electric chair. It was to be the last public hanging in the United States; the execution was witnessed by thousands in downtown Owensboro.

The first person legally executed by the state of Kentucky was Jereboam O. Beauchamp who was hanged in 1826 for the murder of Solomon P. Sharp.

== List of people executed in Kentucky ==
No.	Name	Race	Age	Sex	Date of execution	County	Method	Victim(s)	Governor
1	Harold McQueen Jr.	White	44	M	July 1, 1997	Madison	Electrocution	Rebecca O'Hearn	Paul E. Patton
2	Edward Lee Harper Jr.	White	50	M	May 25, 1999	Jefferson	Lethal injection	Alice Harper and Edward Lee Harper Sr.	Paul E. Patton
3	Marco Allen Chapman	White	37	M	November 21, 2008	Gallatin	Lethal injection	Chelbi Sharon and Cody Sharon	Steve Beshear

== Demographics ==
Race
White	3	100%
Age
30–39	1	33%
40–49	1	33%
50–59	1	33%
Sex
Male	3	100%
Date of execution
1976–1979	0	0%
1980–1989	0	0%
1990–1999	2	66%
2000–2009	1	33%
2010–2019	0	0%
2020–2029	0	0%
Method
Lethal injection	2	66%
Electrocution	1	33%
Governor (Party)
Julian Carroll (D)	0	0%
John Y. Brown Jr. (D)	0	0%
Martha Layne Collins (D)	0	0%
Wallace Wilkinson (D)	0	0%
Brereton C. Jones (D)	0	0%
Paul E. Patton (D)	2	66%
Ernie Fletcher (R)	0	0%
Steve Beshear (D)	1	33%
Matt Bevin (R)	0	0%
Andy Beshear (D)	0	0%
Total	3	100%

== See also ==
- Capital punishment in Kentucky
- Capital punishment in the United States
- List of people executed in Kentucky (pre-1972) – executions before Furman
- https://deathpenaltyusa.org/usa1/state/kentucky1.htm
- https://deathpenaltyusa.org/usa1/state/kentucky2.htm
- https://www.thoughtco.com/kentucky-death-row-inmates-4122946
- https://fbaum.unc.edu/articles/KentuckyDeathPenaltyOverview-Baumgartner.pdf
