= Edward Lee Harper Jr. =

American convicted murderer (1949–1999)

- Born: February 17, 1949; Jefferson County, Kentucky, U.S.
- Died: May 25, 1999 (aged 50); Kentucky State Penitentiary, Kentucky, U.S.
- Status: Executed by lethal injection
- Motive: Financial gain
- Conviction: Murder (2 counts)
- Penalty: Death

Details
- Victims: Edward Lee Harper Sr., 60; Alice Harper, 64
- Date: February 19, 1982
- Location: Kentucky
- Imprisoned at: Kentucky State Penitentiary

Edward Lee Harper Jr. (February 17, 1949 – May 25, 1999) was an American convicted murderer found guilty of killing his adoptive parents in Louisville, Kentucky. On February 19, 1982, Harper shot and killed Alice and Edward Lee Harper Sr. with a .38-caliber handgun to inherit an $86,541 life insurance policy on his father. He was sentenced to death and executed by lethal injection on May 25, 1999, after waiving his remaining appeals and volunteering for execution. Harper became the first inmate in Kentucky to be executed by lethal injection following the state's resumption of capital punishment.

== Murders of Alice and Edward Harper Sr. ==
On February 19, 1982, 33-year-old Edward Lee Harper Jr., also addressed as Eddie Harper, committed the double murder of his adoptive parents.

Before the double murder, Harper, who was adopted as an infant, plotted to kill his adoptive parents, Edward Lee Harper Sr. (May 14, 1921 – February 19, 1982) and Alice Lee Harper (née Long; November 8, 1917 – February 19, 1982), in order to inherit a $86,541 insurance policy on his father's life. At that time, Harper, who was married twice with one son, was laid off from his job as a machinist three months before the murder of his parents.

After purchasing a .38-caliber handgun and some ammunition on the day of the murders, Harper first went to a bar before returning home that same night, entered the bedroom of his parents with the gun, and shot both of them to death while they were asleep. He subsequently disposed of the gun and other pieces of incriminating evidence at a river and ditch, and also made a mess in the bedroom to make it look like a burglary had taken place in his parents' bedroom.

After the police became involved into the case, Harper lied to the officers that his father had kept a .38-caliber gun in his closet and he helped buy the bullets. However, after it was discovered that Harper had bought a gun on the day of the killings, and the seller, Vernon Priddy, had identified Harper based on the description of the buyer, Harper was arrested for the killings of his parents, to which he later confessed despite his initial denials. The gun was also recovered by divers at the river where Harper disposed of the evidence.

== Trial and sentencing ==
After his arrest, Harper was charged with two counts of capital murder, which warrants the death penalty under Kentucky state law.

Harper stood trial before a Jefferson County jury at the Jefferson County Circuit Court, and in his defense, Harper claimed he suffered from a schizophrenic disorder that affected his state of mind when killing his parents, as he heard voices telling him to shoot his father, who was depressed by the increasingly violent nature of his mother towards his father, and he thus shot the both of them. Despite the defense of insanity, Harper was convicted in October 1982 of both charges of capital murder for fatally shooting his parents.

After the conviction of Harper, the prosecution sought the death penalty for Harper, stating that Harper wanted to engineer the deaths of his parents to gain insurance money and inheritance of $250,000 from their estate.

On October 13, 1982, Harper was sentenced to death by the trial court upon the jury's unanimous recommendation for capital punishment.

== Appeal process ==
In March 1985, Harper expressed his wish to be executed and forgo his rights to appeal.

On May 2, 1985, the Kentucky Supreme Court rejected Harper's appeal and affirmed his murder conviction and death sentence.

On May 3, 1985, Harper asked for a rehearing of his appeal by the Kentucky Supreme Court.

On September 3, 1998, the Kentucky Supreme Court rejected Harper's appeal, in which he claimed that he was represented by ineffective legal counsel at his trial and appeal.

== Execution ==
On April 21, 1999, 17 years after he killed his adoptive parents, Governor Paul E. Patton signed the death warrant for Edward Harper Jr., who received an execution date of May 25, 1999.

Even though Harper did not wish to appeal, his lawyers went on to appeal to the federal courts to dismiss his death sentence, and stated that their client was mentally incompetent to give up his remaining appeals. A mental competency hearing was conducted before U.S. District Judge Joseph McKinley in May 1999, and McKinley dismissed the appeal.

On May 24, 1999, the eve of Harper's execution, the 6th U.S. Circuit Court of Appeals rejected the appeal of Harper's lawyers for a stay of execution.

Despite the intention of Harper's lawyers to continue fighting for his life (on the basis that Harper was mentally incompetent to waive his appeal), Harper repeatedly proclaimed that he would not want to appeal and rather be executed than to spend the rest of his life in jail, and he also fired all his lawyers that lodged the appeals for a stay. Harper's intention to die without continuing to appeal his death sentence brought sadness to other condemned inmates on Kentucky's death row, with most disagreeing with Harper's decision and some of them had fruitlessly tried to convince him to change his mind.

On May 25, 1999, 50-year-old Edward Lee Harper Jr. was put to death by lethal injection at the Kentucky State Penitentiary. For his last meal, Harper ordered three bacon, lettuce and tomato sandwiches, a bag of potato chips, a piece of pecan pie with vanilla ice cream and an RC Cola. In his last statement, Harper apologised to the family of his mother and expressed his regret for killing his parents, and he also apologized to his 27-year-old son, telling him that he loved him. Several opponents of capital punishment gathered outside the prison to conduct a vigil for Harper prior to his execution.

On that same day, in Missouri, another convicted murderer named Jessie Lee Wise was also executed for the 1988 murder of 49-year-old Geraldine McDonald.

Harper was the first death row inmate in Kentucky to be executed by lethal injection in the state, after the method of lethal injection was first introduced and signed into law on March 31, 1998, with Harper and other prisoners sentenced before the date given the right to select between the electric chair and lethal injection (Harper chose the latter option). Prior to Harper's execution, the last inmate to be executed by electrocution was Harold McQueen Jr. in 1997; McQueen was additionally the first inmate to be executed in Kentucky since 1962.

For the following nine years after his execution, Harper remained the last person executed in Kentucky, until Marco Allen Chapman, who similarly gave up all his rights to appeal and volunteered to be executed, became the third person to be put to death in the state, also by lethal injection. Since the execution of Chapman, all executions in Kentucky were indefinitely suspended due to a 2010 court order, which was handed down due to an unresolved lawsuit filed against the state's lethal injection protocols.

== See also ==
- Capital punishment in Kentucky
- List of people executed in Kentucky
- List of people executed in the United States in 1999
- Volunteer (capital punishment)

Preceded by Harold McQueen Jr.	Executions carried out in Kentucky	Succeeded by Marco Allen Chapman
