= Gary Schaefer =

Convicted American serial killer

- Born: Gary Lee Schaefer; 1951; Allentown, Pennsylvania, U.S.
- Died: November 26, 2023 (aged 71–72); Eddyville, Kentucky, U.S.
- Occupation: Car mechanic
- Convictions: Murder x1 Kidnapping x2
- Penalty: 30-years-to-life (Richards); 15-to-20-years (Buxton)

Details
- Victims: 2–3 (1 convicted)
- Span of crimes: 1979–1983
- Country: United States
- State: Vermont
- Date apprehended: April 11, 1983

Gary Lee Schaefer (1951 – November 26, 2023) was an American murderer, kidnapper, rapist and suspected serial killer thought to be responsible for the murders of three girls in Springfield, Vermont, between 1979 and 1983. He confessed to two of these murders and remains a suspect in the third, but was convicted of only one, for which he received a 30-year-to-life sentence.

== Early life ==
Gary Lee Schaefer was born in 1951 in Allentown, Pennsylvania, one of several children born to Edwin and June Schaefer. Sometime during his childhood, the entire family moved to Springfield, Vermont, where they joined a closely-knit Christadelphian congregation based in the city. From a young age, Schaefer was considered as a quiet, yet very friendly and reliable child who constantly did what he was told without any objections. While studying at the Springfield High School, he took part in the school's cross country running and track and field teams, where it was said that he showed a lot of athletic potential.

After graduating in 1970, Schaefer enlisted in the Navy (Christadelphian churches do not allow their members to be recruited into the armed forces generally), where he served from April 1975 to 1981, being stationed at Naval Station Great Lakes; Orlando, Florida, Florida; Bethesda, Maryland; Newport, Rhode Island and Norfolk, Virginia. He was court-martialed for setting fire to his apartment, for which he served a 13-month sentence at a military facility in Norfolk. He married his wife Arlene while working at a hospital in Falmouth, Massachusetts, and the couple had two children: a daughter, Jodie, and a young son, who died of SIDS. She and Schaefer's living daughter later moved to North Charleston, South Carolina.

Upon his return to Springfield, Schaefer got a job as an auto mechanic at Soucy Motors, where he was described as a good employee who never created trouble. In addition, he was also an active member of his church, working as a custodian and sometimes even giving sermons on the Bible to younger churchgoers, and took care of his mother after his father died of cancer on April 10, 1982. Accounts from friends and family report that his favorite hobby outside of church duty was to cruise around town in his car, playing Styx songs. Despite these positive qualities, Schaefer was still considered a loner, and still lived in the family farmhouse.

== Murders ==
=== Murder of Sherry Nastasia ===
On August 28, 1979, 13-year-old Sherry Nastasia was reported missing from her home in Springfield after she was last seen climbing into an unknown man's dark green Pontiac Firebird. She remained missing for three months, until a truck driver who had stopped at a rest area near Rockingham discovered skeletal remains near the state police barracks. It was sent to the office of Dr. Eleanor McQuillen, who identified the body as Nastasia's via dental records. Initially, the cause of death could not be determined despite several bones having been broken. Later on, it was determined that she had been likely stabbed to death by her abductor.

=== Murder of Theresa Marie Fenton ===
On August 31, 1981, 12-year-old Theresa Marie Fenton went on a bike ride near her home in Springfield when she was kidnapped and taken to the woods near Mile Hill Road, where she was severely beaten with a blunt instrument, partially buried at the foot of a steep hill and left to die. After she was reported missing, a search party was formed but did not locate her. A man fishing with his children found Fenton when they saw her arm sticking up out of a pile of leaves, but she succumbed to her injuries at the Mary Hitchcock Memorial Hospital in nearby Hanover, New Hampshire the next day.

An extensive investigation was launched in order to find her killer, but it quickly stalled as suspects were ruled out and the detectives ran out of credible leads. Because of this, Springfield Police Chief Peter J. Herdt announced in a press conference that they were asking for help from the public in order to solve the case, hoping for the faint possibility that Fenton's killer might surrender himself. This failed to generate credible leads, and the investigation stalled again.

=== Murder of Katy Richards and arrest ===
On April 9, 1983, 11-year-old Catherine "Katy" Cullen Richards and her friend Rachel Zeitz, also 11, were walking down Pedden Hill Road in Springfield when they noticed the same car had passed them for the third time. Eventually, the driver stopped and asked them for directions to the house of a Joe Cerniglia, but he then got out of the car and threatened to kill them if they did not get in. Richards went inside the car while Zeitz ran towards the home of some neighbors, who quickly called the police. Zeitz described the assailant as being in his 20s, about 6' tall, slim, with short brown hair, wore sunglasses and a distinct red-hooded sweatshirt with the number "1983" written on one sleeve, and possibly drove a light-blue Pontiac Sunbird with a dark blue roof. The following day, Richards' partially-undressed body was found in a forested area near Springfield, showing signs of sexual assault and injuries from a blunt instrument.

An identikit was made of the supposed abductor, and investigators were dispatched to interview potential witnesses. One of them was James Millay Sr., a member of the local Christadelphian Church, who said that he had seen two girls matching the victims' description on Pedden Road, the same day that he had met a friend and fellow church-goer named Gary Schaefer, who had to leave services early due to a supposed illness. When presented with a photograph of the man, police took notice of huge similarities between Schaefer and the sketch, and they went to interrogate him at his mother's home. Schaefer denied responsibility, claiming that he had gone to Rutland with a co-worker to "pick up some cars". However, after questioning his mother and said co-worker, policemen determined that Schaefer was lying and immediately arrested him. After searching the house, investigators found the red sweatshirt described by Zeitz, which served as additional physical evidence to his potential guilt. Schaefer was put on suicide watch at the Woodstock Correctional Center with his bail set at $50,000, pleading not guilty on all charges brought against him. By that time, it was suggested that he might be linked to the murders of Nastasia and Fenton from years prior.

== Trials and charges ==
=== Buxton kidnapping trial ===
Before the trial even began, Schaefer was proposed as a suspect in the November 12, 1982 kidnapping and attempted rape of a 17-year-old girl in Chester. In that incident, Deana Buxton was picked up by a man who claimed to be from Bellows Falls, but when she entered a car, he pulled a shotgun on her and made sexual advances towards her. She managed to escape when the offender stopped to buy some beer at a convenience store in Hartford. He would eventually be arraigned on a separate kidnapping charge for this case on April 21, 1983.

On the aforementioned date, the trial began in the district court of White River Junction. At the trial, a discrepancy in police statements was corrected, as it was revealed that the alleged offender had stopped to relieve himself at the rest area, and not to buy beer. Much of the information surrounding the trial was sealed, as Justice George F. Ellison issued a gag order on the case, citing his concern about the possibility of the defendant not getting a fair trial due to the extensive media coverage.

=== Richards murder trial ===
Even before the Buxton trial had concluded, Schaefer was charged with the Richards murder, since lab results examining blood and hair samples were finally released. The prosecutor, William S. Bos, noted that it would not prejudice the case, as both he and the police were confident that Schaefer was the perpetrator. In response to these charges, Schaefer pleaded not guilty. In the meantime, two newspapers, the Vermont-based Rutland Herald and the New Hampshire-based Valley News, filed suit against Justice Ellison, claiming that his gag order and subsequent media blackout on the trial was unconstitutional.

In early October 1983, Richards' mother told the press that Schaefer had allegedly written a letter in which he confessed his responsibility for the murder of her daughter and Theresa Fenton, but was unable to provide it due to the gag order issued on the case. The following month, after undergoing a psychiatric examination conducted by doctors E. Haskell Schell Jr. and Erwin Stunkel, Schaefer was declared sane to stand trial. On December 5, Schaefer suddenly changed his plea to no contest, saying through his attorney that he wanted to "clear himself in the eyes of God". As a result, he was given a 30-year-to-life sentence for the Richards killing, with an additional 15-to-20 years for the other charges relating to the Buxton case. After sentencing, his attorney, Donald H. Graham, suggested that Schaefer be enrolled in a sex offender treatment study at Johns Hopkins University in Baltimore, where he would undergo treatment with Depo-Provera.

=== Fenton and Nastasia charges ===
Following the Richards conviction, authorities started investigating Schaefer in relation to other murders, including the 1968 murder of Joanne Dunham in Charlestown, New Hampshire - a possible victim of the Connecticut River Valley Killer. In January 1984, it was decided that authorities would interview Schaefer for the Fenton murder. The interview would be conducted at the Woodstock Community Correctional Center, before he could be transferred to the St. Albans Correctional Center and later to a federal prison. Schaefer later met with Fenton's mother, and during their talk, he reportedly confessed to the murder again, but as he was granted immunity from prosecution as part of his plea deal, he could not be charged with the murder. Fenton's parents later created the Theresa M. Fenton Information Fund, which provided trustees and family members of Schaefer's victims with monetary compensation. A notable exception was Deana Buxton, who later attempted to sue the foundation for $14,000, saying that she was entitled to the money as she was the one who had positively identified Schaefer out of a suspect line-up.

== Sentencing and aftermath ==
On May 7, 1984, Schaefer was finally charged with Nastasia's murder, with Justice Ellison presiding over the trial. Schaefer pleaded not guilty to the murder, with his lawyer alleging that his naval records showed that he was not in Springfield on the day of the murder. This trial received substantial media coverage, which raised concerns that some of the evidence might be rendered inadmissible. The trial itself was also prolonged by the fact that Ellison granted Schaefer's lawyer additional time to locate supposed witnesses which could corroborate his client's alibi.

At one point, Detective Michael J. LeClair of the Windsor County Attorney's Office claimed that the Springfield police had botched the original investigations, and offered to interview Schaefer anew in relation to the Nastasia case, which was denied. In an unexpected turn of events, the psychologist who had previously examined Schaefer, Edwin Stunkel, announced that the convict suffered from multiple personality disorder.

Eventually, the murder charges against Schaefer were dropped altogether, as a judge ruled that his confession was obtained illegitimately through hypnosis. Three years later, representatives of several newspapers requested that the case records finally be unsealed, but to no avail. As of December 2021, the Nastasia murder officially remains unsolved.

In May 1985 he was imprisoned at the Kentucky State Penitentiary in Eddyville, Kentucky. He remained there until November 26, 2023, when he died after suffering an unsuspicious medical event.

== See also ==
- Connecticut River Valley Killer
