= Beoria Simmons =

Convicted American serial killer

- Mugshot of Beoria Simmons
- Born: Beoria Abraham Simmons II; May 17, 1954 (age 72); Louisville, Kentucky, U.S.
- Convictions: Murder (3 counts); Attempted murder; Kidnapping resulting in death (3 counts); Kidnapping; First degree rape (3 counts); Attempted first degree rape
- Penalty: Death; commuted to life imprisonment

Details
- Victims: 3
- Span of crimes: May 18, 1981 – March 12, 1983
- Country: United States
- State: Kentucky
- Date apprehended: June 11, 1983
- Imprisoned at: Kentucky State Penitentiary

Beoria Abraham Simmons II (born May 17, 1954) is an American serial killer who kidnapped and murdered two women and a teenage girl in Jefferson County, Kentucky, between 1981 and 1983. He was arrested after failing to kidnap a fourth victim, and by the time of his capture, another man had been wrongfully imprisoned for one of his crimes. Simmons was convicted and originally sentenced to death, but his sentence was reduced to life in prison in 2010.

== Early life ==
Simmons was born on May 17, 1954, in Louisville, Kentucky, the son of a retired Army sergeant. Although little was reported about his childhood, as a young man he attended Louisville's Spalding College and graduated with a bachelor's degree in social work. Afterwards, a supervisor netted him a date with his sister-in-law. Six months before his 1983 arrest, Simmons was granted a job as a halfway house counselor. He was considered an upstanding citizen by his peers, but a psychiatrist who would later evaluate Simmons before his trial diagnosed him with mild depression.

== Murders ==
=== Robin L. Barnes ===
On May 18, 1981, a fisherman discovered the body of Robin L. Barnes, 15, in a marshy area in southern Jefferson County. Barnes was a middle school cheerleader who had a history of running away and was known to hitchhike. Barnes' body was fully clothed, and police originally began investigating her relatives and acquaintances and reportedly conducted as many as 75 interviews with people with connections to her. Detectives found a singular pubic hair on her coat, which suggested she had been raped.

Investigators collected three bullet casings from beneath her body and submitted them to the Kentucky State Police Regional Crime Lab in Louisville, and experts concluded the bullets had been fired from a .360 caliber pistol. Detective Pat Conkling made trips to three gun shops in the area and ran reports on customers who had recently bought or owned a .360 caliber pistol. However, each person had an alibi at the time of the murder. With few leads to go off of, investigators presented the case on Crime Stoppers, and this fueled dozens of tips but none led to an arrest.

=== Shannon House ===
Over ten months after Barnes' murder, on March 25, 1982, a roofer found the body of 29-year-old Shannon House in a wooded area near Iroquois Park in southern Louisville. At the time, police believed there was no connection with the Barnes case'; House much older than Barnes, was shot once while Barnes was shot three times, and the murder scenes were 12 miles apart. The only thing similar was that both had been raped, but police still had no evidence at the time to suggest that they were connected.

As with Barnes' case, police investigated acquaintances of House, but all were eventually ruled out. During the investigation, detectives uncovered a bullet casing, which was confirmed to have been fired from a .360 caliber pistol, which investigators used to link both cases together.

=== Nancy Bettman ===
On March 12, 1983, three boys discovered the body of 39-year-old Nancy Bettman laying in a creek beside a golf course. Bettman had been shot once in the back of the head, and unlike the previous victims, she was partially nude. Police suspected her murder was related to the others, and ballistics evidence confirmed it.

== Investigation ==
A profile of the suspected killer was made. Psychologists theorized the killer had been raised in a religious family and had an authoritarian father. They also believed the killer was well known in the community and had a good reputation. Due to the killer's pattern of striking once a year, investigators theorized he might have been passing through, killing elsewhere when not in Louisville. Detectives reached out to police departments all around the country about any murders that fitted the profile, but none were found.

=== Arrest ===
In the early hours of June 11, 1983, a 16-year-old girl was kidnapped by a heavy-set black man at gunpoint, who later drove her to Iroquois Park. When there, the man got out and ordered her to do the same, but when she did she stabbed him with a pocketknife and ran away. She found shelter in a nearby convenience store and called the police to report the attack. At the same time, police became aware of a man who had arrived at Humana Hospital with a knife wound. The man, 29-year-old Beoria Abraham Simmons II, claimed he had been robbed and stabbed by three hitchhikers.

Police made a connection; the girl said her attacker had driven a 1975 Chrysler Cordoba, which Simmons had also owned. The girl identified Simmons's vehicle and later Simmons himself. Simmons was questioned, and confessed. Police also immediately linked him to the murders due to finding a .380 caliber pistol under the driver seat of his car, which matched the murder weapon used in the killings. When confronted he confessed, but claimed the killings were accidental after heated arguments with the victims.

== Wrongful conviction of Paul Thomas ==
On June 10, 1982, a woman named Phyllis Downes was accosted by a black man wielding a gun at a bus stop in Louisville. The man attempted to force Downes into his car, which was a lime-green Chevrolet Camaro, but instead of getting in she ran to a nearby bus attempting to get it to stop, and the man drove away. She described her attacker as a black man with large arms, a heavyset build, a big head, and no facial hair. Police began investigating Paul Davis Thomas, a black man with a similar build who owned a dark green vehicle. They arrested him after Downes identified him from a series of photos, and he was also charged with the rape of a woman that occurred days prior to Downes' attempted abduction. Thomas was tried under an all-white jury and was convicted, receiving a three-year sentence, and was acquitted in the rape case. Following Simmons' arrest five months after Thomas' conviction, the prosecutor involved in Thomas' case became overwhelmed after seeing Simmons' picture and ran a report to the Louisville homicide office, where it was learned that Simmons drove a light green Camaro and owned a semi-automatic pistol.

Following this, Thomas was given three lie detector tests, all of which proved he was telling the truth when he denied committing the crime. When Downes returned to Kentucky from North Carolina, she was shown Simmons' photo, and identified him as the culprit who she ran into that night. Consequently, Thomas' convictions were overturned and he was released from prison. In a post-release interview, Thomas said he believed he was convicted since he was a black man going up trying to defend himself against a bunch of white people.

== Trial and aftermath ==
Simmons went to trial 20 months later. He admitted to killing the three women but claimed to be insane, attempting an insanity defense. A psychologist reviewed him and diagnosed him with depression, but said he was not insane. In the end, Simmons was found criminally responsible and guilty of murdering the three women, with the jury imposing the sentence of death. In 2010, his sentence was changed to 6 life terms without parole after a successful appeal. In a deal with prosecutors, Simmons agreed to waive his right to parole.

== See also ==
- Cleo Joel Green
- Larry Lamont White
- List of serial killers in the United States
