= Marco Allen Chapman =

American murderer

- Born: September 4, 1971; West Virginia, U.S.
- Died: November 21, 2008 (aged 37); Kentucky State Penitentiary, Kentucky, U.S.
- Status: Executed by lethal injection
- Motive: Revenge for Carolyn Marksberry advising a friend to end her abusive relationship with him
- Convictions: Murder (2 counts); Attempted murder (2 counts); First degree rape First degree burglary First degree robbery
- Penalty: Death

Details
- Victims: Chelbi Marksberry, 7 Cody Marksberry, 6
- Date: August 23, 2002
- Injured: Carolyn Marksberry; Courtney Sharon
- Weapon: Knife
- Imprisoned at: Kentucky State Penitentiary

Marco Allen Chapman (September 4, 1971 – November 21, 2008) was a convicted murderer and the last person executed by the Commonwealth of Kentucky. He was executed on November 21, 2008, by lethal injection at the Kentucky State Penitentiary in Eddyville, Kentucky. Chapman was executed for a series of murders he committed on August 23, 2002, in Warsaw, Kentucky, on Weldon Way, killing two children, Chelbi Sharon, 7, and Cody Sharon, 6, by stabbing after he had raped and stabbed their mother, Carolyn Marksberry, the city clerk of Warsaw at the time, over 15 times. 10-year-old Courtney Sharon played dead after she had also been stabbed by Chapman several times, and escaped.

== Early life ==
Marco Allen Chapman was born in West Virginia on September 4, 1971. Both of his parents were alcoholics. His father was sexually abusive and would often beat him until he was unconscious. His mother whacked him many times in the head with a skillet. Chapman was suicidal as a child and began abusing drugs as a result. Chapman suffered from depression, suffered from flashbacks and hallucinations, and, according to a court motion, showed symptoms of bipolar disorder. Chapman dropped out of school in the 8th grade.

The federal government had convicted Chapman of a bank robbery in Texas. While serving his sentence at FCI Oakdale, in Oakdale, Chapman was known as "the kid". He held a job in the paint shop which paid him 19 cents an hour, and was a good worker. He was well liked by his peers in prison and for the most part abided by the rules and stayed out of trouble. Those who knew him in prison described him as a nice, responsible individual.

Chapman previously worked in construction and as a soccer coach.

Chapman's last known address was in Warsaw, but the Boone County Sheriff's Office said he had been staying at a home on Beaver Road in Boone County.

== Murders of Cody and Chelbi Sharon ==
On August 23, 2002, some time between 4:10 a.m. and 5:49 a.m., Chapman knocked on Carolyn Marksberry's door on Weldon Way, waking her up, and asking to use her telephone. Carolyn let Chapman in.

Chapman had previously played cards with Carolyn's family, and helped with some home improvement work at her house. Chapman claimed he and "Carolyn had been involved in a sexual relationship for about a year", and that he knew Chuck Marksberry, Carolyn's husband, was working out of the country. Chapman admitted going to Carolyn's home armed with a knife, but he said he planned to have consensual sex with her, and had only premeditated the robbery. After they had consensual sex, according to Chapman, Carolyn "raised all kinds of hell" when he told her that he was going to steal from her.

Carolyn Marksberry had been counseling her best friend, unnamed, to get out of an abusive relationship with Chapman. The friend lived within yards of the Marksberry home on Weldon Way. Ms. Marksberry's unidentified friend often spent the night at the Marksberry home since she was afraid of Chapman.

Immediately after Carolyn let Chapman in, he punched her in the stomach, and pulled out a knife he had in his duffel bag, "put a knife to [Carolyn's] throat," and demanded of Carolyn to give him money. Carolyn gave Chapman all of her credit cards and all of her cash, which amounted to about $120. Chapman then "bounded her hands with duct tape, tied her to the bed frame, and raped her". He used the cord he had cut from her vacuum cleaner, and apologized to Carolyn for cutting the cord, before sexually assaulting her. Chapman stabbed Carolyn repeatedly, even going to the kitchen to get more knives after breaking two during the attack. Chapman stabbed Carolyn a total of 15 times with a knife that broke off in her chest, and then he "attacked her children."

Marksberry's youngest child, her son, Cody, 6, was awakened by the noise, and came into the bedroom during the attack, and told his mother he'd had a bad dream. Carolyn told Cody to return to bed and to turn on the light, so he would not be afraid. Cody, instead, went into Courtney Sharon's room, awakening his 10-year-old sister. According to Linda Tally Smith, Cody said, "I think Mom needs help. Mom's hurt." Courtney had already been awakened by her mother's cries for help. Courtney went into the hallway to find her younger brother Cody saying their mother was hurt. Courtney and Cody met Chapman coming out of the bedroom. He told them that their mother was hurt, and that they needed to call an ambulance. Chapman then attacked Courtney Sharon. He missed Courtney's throat, slashing her ear instead. Courtney Sharon fell to the floor and played dead. Courtney peeked and saw Chapman stab her brother Cody with a serrated-edged knife, and then saw Cody fall "to the ground."

Chapman then went to Chelbi's room to kill her. Chelbi Sharon, 7, tried to fight him, but he slit her throat too. "Their throats were slashed and they bled to death," Kentucky State Police Detective Todd Harwood said. Both Cody Sharon, 6, and Chelbi Sharon, 7, had their throats slit, and they also had many stab wounds in their bodies. While still tied up on the bed, Carolyn Marksberry listened to the horror. "She could hear her kids screaming."

Courtney told Cody she was going for help. Courtney grabbed Cody's hand and said, "I gotta go get help." Cody responded, "No, don't leave me." Courtney said, "I'll be there in a minute. I'll be back." Courtney ran out the back door to a neighbor's house.

After killing Chelbi, Chapman had heard the back door bang, and came back out. That's when he saw that Courtney Sharon was gone. Chapman took more things out of the house, and then fled.

When Chapman left, Carolyn Marksberry, in the nude, and bleeding badly, gnawed through her restraints, and jerked loose from the vacuum cord binding her to the bed. Carolyn crawled over Cody's slain body, and eventually made it to a neighbor's house. Carolyn crawled to the neighbor's porch, and used her head to bang on the door."

Neighbors told police they heard tires squealing near the Weldon Way residence about 5 a.m. The initial call was heard by Gallatin County's 911 dispatch at 6 a.m. Warsaw Police Chief Donnie Gould was the first officer on the scene.

Linda Tally Smith, the Commonwealth's lead prosecutor in Gallatin and Boone County, said she thinks that Chapman was a crack cocaine abuser coming off a crack binge, and had targeted Marksberry for robbery; in part because he probably knew that her husband was out of town for job training. "He basically was just desperate for money," Smith said. Chuck Marksberry, Carolyn's husband, was coming back from a trip to Spain for the steel company employer he was working for, and was en route back to Cincinnati when the attack took place.

Courtney Sharon, 10, was wounded, and taken to Children's Hospital in Cincinnati. Carolyn Marksberry had many stab wounds and a collapsed lung, and was in critical condition. "Her wounds were deep," Sandra Miller, a University of Cincinnati surgeon, said. "[There were] cuts to her neck and trachea. She had a collapsed lung due to a stab wound to the chest, but the lung has re-expanded now." Carolyn also suffered "eye trauma." Carolyn Marksberry underwent 5 hours of emergency surgery.

== Arrest ==
Chapman was arrested later the same day at 12:30 p.m. in Shrewsbury, West Virginia, approximately 8 hours after the attack.

At his Boone County home, Chapman dropped off the Geo he was driving, and swapped it out with his friend's gray 1992 Dodge Dakota. After cleaning himself up, Chapman left a note telling his friend that he was taking the Dakota out to "get a load of firewood". This gray 1992 Dodge Dakota is what Chapman was driving when authorities caught him that day. The police found blood on Chapman's clothes, a bloody knife in the gray 1992 Dodge Dakota, and blood in the Geo, which was parked in Boone County. After being picked up by the authorities in West Virginia, Chapman confessed to the crimes on tape.

To the authorities in West Virginia, Chapman said he was "gonna go get some party materials and park out in the woods somewhere and die". Chapman asked one of the police officers, "How about doing me a favor and put a bullet in my forehead?"

Chapman was arraigned in Charleston, W.V., charged with 5 charges (2 counts of murder, 2 counts of assault, and 1 count of burglary), and extradited to Kentucky.

District Judge Charles Moore sends the felony case immediately to the Grand Jury. Chapman pleaded not guilty to the five charges, and was being held at the Carroll County Regional Detention Center on a $50 million bond.

== Criminal trial and death sentence ==
Detective Harwood, the detective who transported Chapman back to Kentucky, said that Chapman had shown no remorse for the crimes he was charged with before the preliminary hearing. Detective Harwood said Chapman made jokes about raping his next cellmate, and suggested the best route to take to get back to Warsaw.

John Delaney was the public defender appointed to represent Chapman. Jim Gibson, a death-penalty specialist in the public defender's office in Frankfort, assisted John Delaney. Linda Tally Smith said she may seek the death penalty.

When a police officer was testifying about how Carolyn Marksberry had to crawl over the lifeless body of her 6 year old son Cody, Chapman bowed his head down, and wept.

"To this day, I still don't know why. I don't know exactly what happened that night," Chapman said. "I did something that was immoral and wrong. I want to pay the price for it."

On January 15, 2004, during a routine transfer for a pretrial hearing in Boone County, Chapman managed to unshackle his legs, and tried to run away, by running across the parking lot. Authorities tackled Chapman within 10 yards of his starting spot, his hands still cuffed, and chained at the waist. Chapman would later on explain that his mission was to provoke the police into killing him on the spot.

Chapman changed his plea to guilty, and asked to be put to death. In October 2004, Chapman wrote to Boone County Judge Anthony Frohlich he wanted to fire his attorneys, end any legal proceedings to prevent his execution, and be sentenced to death. Judge Frohlich urged Chapman not to give up his right to a trial.

Chapman wrote that his guilt was "too much for" him "to bear," and that he wanted "the Marksberrys to feel that justice has been served with my death." Chapman hoped his execution would "free the Marksberry family from the nightmares he inflicted on them".

One possible argument the defense had prepared was to point out Chapman's "wretched childhood", which could have saved him from the death penalty. Chapman himself argued that his troubled life was no excuse for his crimes.

On December 7, 2004, Judge Frohlich determined that Chapman was mentally competent, and that his requests were ones of a mentally stable man. In one document alone, he had to provide his signature for each of his 13 constitutional rights that he waived as part of his desire to be executed. Frohlich then ordered Delaney and Gibson, Chapman's court appointed lawyers, to remain on standby in case Chapman needed counsel. Delaney objected, saying he wanted no part in Chapman's "suicide". Frohlich ordered them to act as standby counsel.

On December 14, 2004, Chapman was sentenced to death by Judge Frohlich, without a jury trial, for the deaths of Cody and Chelbi Sharon. Judge Frohlich sentenced Chapman to death for the double homicide, "20-years' imprisonment for each attempted murder conviction, life imprisonment for the rape, 20-years' imprisonment for the robbery, and 20-years' imprisonment for the burglary."

The U.S. Supreme Court denied a last-ditch request to halt the execution from an attorney for people challenging the state's regulations on lethal injection.

The Kentucky Supreme Court also had denied an emergency motion in the case filed by Philip Longmeyer. After his sentencing, Chapman had consistently asked that all appeals in his case stop.

"It's long and drawn out," Chapman said, "I don't see why it should take so long. If a man is sane and competent, he ought to be able to get his wishes... especially when you plea-bargain for it."

John Delaney, Chapman's lawyer, said that Chapman was not criminally responsible at the time of the murders. To Delaney, Chapman wanted to commit suicide, and was getting the state of Kentucky to do it for him.

Reverend Pat Delahanty, the President of the Kentucky Coalition to Abolish the Death Penalty, concurred with this opinion. "It's a form of state-assisted suicide, really."

"I guess it's kind of my Christian upbringing," Chapman said. "Suicide is unforgivable. I figure if I'm not doing it to myself, it's not a suicide."

Under Kentucky law, incompetent to stand trial means that the defendant "lacks the capacity to appreciate the nature and consequences of the proceedings against one or to participate rationally in one's own defense." Since Chapman was found competent based on Kentucky law, "there is nothing inherently unconstitutional about a person deciding to take responsibility for his or her criminal misconduct." The court system does not have to accept any plea agreements regardless if criminals ask to be sentenced to death or not. Following up on Chapman v. Commonwealth, Chapman's plea was granted "because it was based on appropriateness for the crimes and not on the defendant's wishes". Kentucky Supreme Court determined that Chapman's plea was not an impermissible "suicide by court", that the plea was "competently, knowingly, intelligently and voluntarily made", and that the death penalty was "not a disproportionate sentence for Chapman's heinous offenses".

== Final statement ==
Chapman wrote in a statement he gave to Warden Tom Simpson to read, "I don't know why I did the thing that I did, and I know the hate of me over that night must be overwhelming, but Carolyn and Courtney you have to know that wasn't who I was or am," "I am not a moster (sic) even though I did a mosterously (sic) evil thing. That is why I give my life willing as well as quickly in hopes that you know how truly sorry I am. I hurt and ache daily for the loss I've created in the Marksberrys' family, but I hurt as well. I don't know if I deserve heaven after what I did, but I pray with all my heart that I find some sort of peace and happiness after my last breath."

== Final words ==
After Simpson read the statement, Chapman looked toward the two-way mirror on wall to the room where the family was and said how "terribly sorry" he was. The gallery witnessing the execution had about 20 citizens, including the slain children's grandfather, Garry Sharon. Chapman's voice shook, and he had tears in his eyes as he begged for forgiveness.

Chapman's final words were, "Carolyn. I want you to know. I am truly sorry. I don't know why it happened. This is the man. I am willing to give my life."

== Execution ==
Chapman was executed on November 21, 2008, by lethal injection in the previously unused new chamber at the Kentucky State Penitentiary in Eddyville, Kentucky.

At 8:15 p.m. Prison Warden Tom Simpson drew back the curtain so media witnesses could see Chapman. He was lying on his back with both arms tied to a gurney at right angles, perpendicular to his body. There were needles in each of his forearms. He was wearing a red T-shirt and was covered up to his chest by a white sheet. One witness said that Chapman had aged visibly in the last few months.

At 8:20 p.m. EST, Tom Simpson gave the order to start the deadly three-drug cocktail to flow into Chapman's veins. The three drugs were sodium thiopental, pancuronium bromide, and potassium chloride. Sodium thiopental rendered Chapman unconscious.

At 8:22 p.m. EST, Chapman swallowed a couple of times, took a series of short breaths, and then his breathing became shallow. Pancuronium bromide stopped his breathing by paralyzing his muscles.

At 8:23 p.m. EST, Chapman's chest stopped rising, and he was motionless. At the same time, Warden Simpson reached over and closed Chapman's eyes. Potassium chloride stopped Chapman's heart.

At 8:29 p.m. EST, Chapman's skin color had changed noticeably, which indicated that his blood was no longer circulating.

At 8:34 p.m. EST, (7:34 p.m. CST) Chapman was pronounced dead by Warden Tom Simpson.

Corrections officers said that Chapman's mood was "peaceful". Paul Miles of 84WHAS radio, said he saw a tear come down from deputy warden Greg Howard's cheek.

After his execution, a hearse drove Chapman's body to the Lyon County Coroner's office, and he was cremated.

"I pray daily but not just for me but for Carolyn and Courtney that even though they have the right to hate me, I just hope they don't live with hate in their hearts," Chapman said in a last statement which was released shortly after the execution by prison officials.

The Associated Press reported that right before Chapman's execution, a group of about 10 people huddled in a semi-heated tent and read aloud the names of Kentucky's Death Row inmates and their victims. They prayed for Chapman, his victims and his execution team. Reverend Patrick Delahanty held a candlelight vigil on the day Chapman was executed because he wanted their presence to show that state executions are "not acceptable to everybody."

Carolyn Marksberry and her family issued a statement that was read to reporters after the execution. "I believe the tears shed today should be for the victims of this crime, not Marco Chapman. Perhaps now though, not only can our family and community start to heal, but Cody and Chelbi can rest in peace."

"The Bible says an eye for an eye," Garry Sharon said. "He took the lives of two babies. He deserves to die."

Chapman remains the most recent person executed by the Commonwealth of Kentucky. Steve Beshear, Democrat, was Governor at the time. The two previous executions by the state were Edward Lee Harper Jr. on May 25, 1999, and Harold McQueen Jr. on July 1, 1997, both in Eddyville. Chapman and Harper were executed by lethal injection, and McQueen by electrocution. Harper, like Chapman, waived the remainder of his appeals, and was executed in 1999.

== See also ==
- Capital punishment in Kentucky
- Capital punishment in the United States
- List of most recent executions by jurisdiction
- List of people executed in Kentucky
- List of people executed in the United States in 2008
- Volunteer (capital punishment)

Preceded by Edward Lee Harper Jr.	Executions carried out in Kentucky	Succeeded by None
