= Cleo Joel Green =

American murderer and burglar (1957–2006)

- Green in 1989
- Born: September 7, 1957; Jefferson County, Kentucky, U.S.
- Died: May 12, 2006 (aged 48); Louisville, Kentucky, U.S.
- Other name: "Red Demon"
- Convictions: Murder; Burglary; Assault; Attempted rape
- Penalty: 40 years' imprisonment

Details
- Span of crimes: July – August 1983
- Country: United States
- State: Kentucky
- Date apprehended: August 13, 1983

Cleo Joel Green III (September 7, 1957 – May 12, 2006) was an American murderer and burglar active in Louisville, Kentucky, in the summer of 1983. In 1989, he was convicted of the murder of 76-year-old Ina Mae York, as well as two other attacks.

== Background ==
In 1983, Green was unemployed and living with his mother. He was known to have been diagnosed with schizophrenia, and at the time of his arrest, he believed that he was being chased by a large bird and floating demons.

== Attacks and arrest ==
On July 3, 1983, Green burglarized the Clarksdale Housing Complex apartment of 76-year-old Ina Mae York and attacked her with a hatchet in her bedroom. Her son discovered her decapitated body the following morning.

On July 19, Green broke into the home of 73-year-old Almira Watson. He stole a radio and stabbed her in the neck 22 times with a pair of scissors, which she survived.

Around 12:30 a.m. on August 13, Green entered the apartment of 69-year-old Rosetta M. Smith, a double amputee on a kidney dialysis machine, through a window. Green assaulted and attempted to rape her, though she managed to fight him off for an hour and a half, ending when she "grabbed him by the testicles and squeezed until he passed out" and then alerted neighbors. When police arrived, Green was still lying unconscious on the floor. He was arrested and held on a $100,000 bond.

== Trial and imprisonment ==
Green was ruled incompetent to stand trial three times until 1989, when his mental illness subsided. On November 20, he pleaded guilty to the murder of York and the two other attacks and was sentenced to 40 years' imprisonment. Due to his guilty plea, he avoided a possible death sentence, and due to time served, he was considered eligible for parole in 1991, the earliest. However, it is unclear when or if he was ever released.

Green died on May 12, 2006, in Louisville.

== See also ==
- Beoria Simmons
- Larry Lamont White
