= Connecticut River Valley Killer =

Unidentified American serial killer

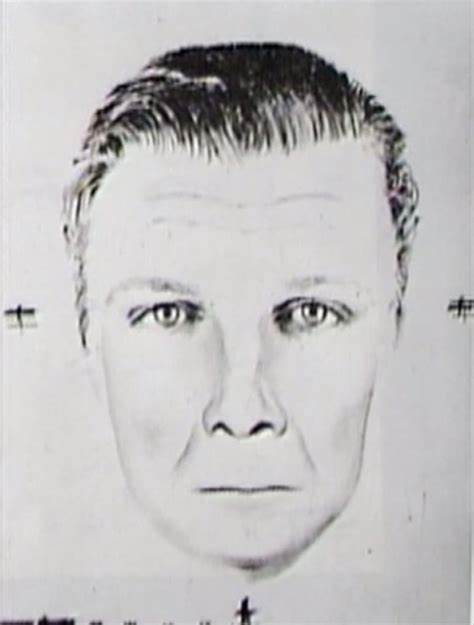
- Composite sketch of Boroski’s unidentified attacker, possibly the Valley Killer.

Details
- Victims: 7+
- Span of crimes: October 24, 1978 – August 6, 1988 (Confirmed)
- Country: United States
- States: New Hampshire, Vermont

The Connecticut River Valley Killer, also known as the Valley Killer, is the moniker for an unidentified American serial killer believed to be responsible for at least seven murders of women in the Connecticut River Valley region of New England between 1978 and 1988.

In 1985 and 1986, the skeletal remains of two victims were recovered within one thousand feet (300 m) of each other in a wooded area in Kelleyville, New Hampshire; forensic examination indicated multiple stab wounds. Between the recovery of the first and second bodies, a 36-year-old woman was fatally stabbed in a frenzied attack inside her home in Saxtons River, Vermont. Ten days later, the remains of a third missing woman were found, also bearing evidence of stab wounds. At this point, investigators began examining prior homicides in the area and found two previous cases, in 1978 and 1981, further reinforcing the presence of a serial killer.

At the peak of the investigation, and after additional homicides and one non-fatal attack, investigators noted similarities in modus operandi, often-used dump sites and specific wound patterns that linked many of the murders, suggesting a common perpetrator. The murders apparently stopped in 1988 after a woman survived an encounter with the killer.

== Victims ==
=== Confirmed ===
- On October 24, 1978, 27-year-old Catherine Millican left work and went to the Chandler Brook Wetland Preserve in New London, New Hampshire, where she was photographing birds. Her body, bearing multiple stab wounds, was found yards away from where she was last seen.
- On July 25, 1981, 37-year-old Mary Elizabeth "Betsy" Critchley, a student from the University of Vermont, disappeared near Interstate 91 at the Massachusetts-Vermont border, where she had been hitchhiking to Waterbury, Vermont. She was last seen by a friend who dropped her off near Exit 13 of the Massachusetts Turnpike. On August 9, her body was found in a wooded area off Unity Stage Road in Unity, New Hampshire, about eighty miles from where she was last seen. Owing to the condition of the body, the medical examiner was unable to determine a cause of death.
- On May 30, 1984, Bernice Courtemanche, a 17-year-old nurse's aide and high school student, was last seen by her boyfriend's mother in Claremont, New Hampshire. She was thought to have set out to see her boyfriend in Newport by hitchhiking along New Hampshire Route 12. She did not reach her destination and was subsequently reported missing. On April 19, 1986, a fisherman happened upon Courtemanche's remains near the Sugar River in Newport. Forensic examination uncovered evidence of knife wounds to the chest and an injury to the head.
- On July 10, 1985, 27-year-old single mother Eva Marie Morse was last seen hitchhiking near the border of Charlestown, New Hampshire, on Route 12. On April 25, 1986, Morse's remains were found by loggers in Unity, New Hampshire, about 500 feet (150 m) from where Critchley's body had been discovered in 1981. Post-mortem examination found evidence of knife wounds to Morse's chest and neck.
- On April 15, 1986, 36-year-old Lynda Moore was doing yard work alone outside her home in Saxtons River, Vermont, near Route 121 at 2 p.m. while her husband was at work. That evening, her husband returned home an hour after she was last seen to find his wife's dead body in the living room, bearing twenty-five knife wounds. The crime scene suggested a fierce struggle had taken place. There were no signs of forced entry or ransacking. Numerous witnesses reported having seen a slightly stocky, dark-haired man with a blue knapsack lingering near Moore's home the day of the murder. The man was thought to be between 20-and-25-years-old, clean shaven, with a round face and wearing dark-rimmed glasses. The following year, a composite sketch was released. The true crime podcast Dark Valley, however, indicates that the man in question was identified and excluded by police.

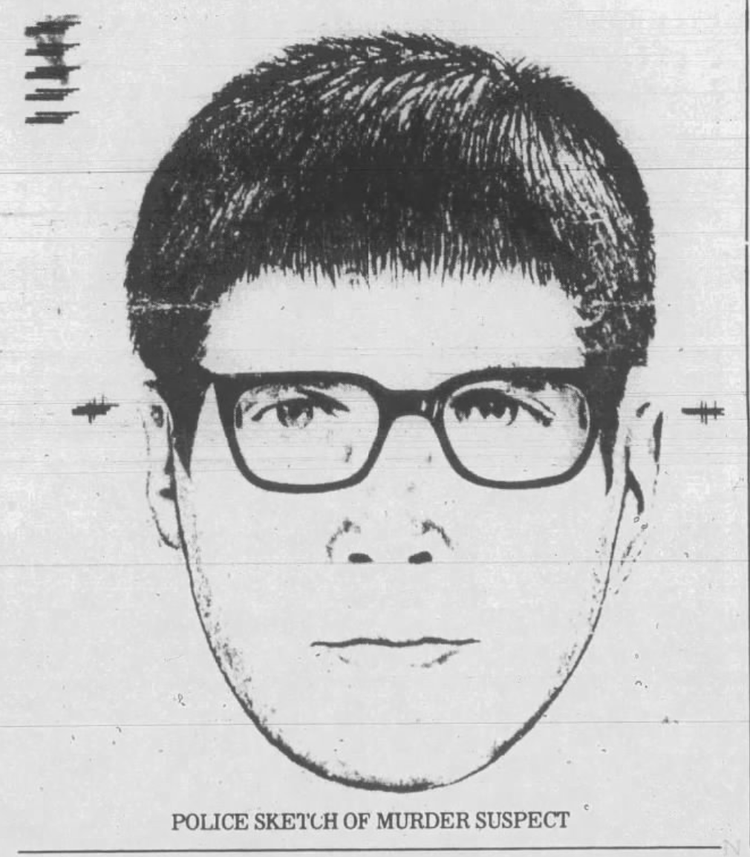
Sketch of the man seen entering Moore's home just before her murder.

- On January 10, 1987, 38-year-old nurse Barbara Agnew was last seen heading to her home in Norwich, Vermont. That evening, a snowplow driver encountered her green BMW at a northbound Interstate 91 rest stop in Hartford, Vermont. The door was cracked and there was blood on the steering wheel and back seat. Some of her bloodstained belongings were found in a nearby dumpster. On March 28, 1987, Agnew's body was found near an apple tree on Advent Hill Road in a wooded area in Hartland, Vermont, twelve miles from the rest area. She had been stabbed repeatedly in the neck and chest. She had several defensive wounds, as well as a "disabling" wound.
- Late in the evening on August 6, 1988, 22-year-old Jane Boroski, seven months pregnant, was returning from a county fair in Keene, New Hampshire, when she stopped at a closed convenience store in West Swanzey to purchase soda from a vending machine. She had returned to her car when she took notice of a Jeep Wagoneer parked next to her. Through her rear-view mirror, Boroski saw the driver of the Jeep walking around the back of her vehicle. He then approached her open window and asked her if the payphone was working, at which time he immediately grabbed her and pulled her out. Boroski struggled, and the man accused her of beating up his girlfriend and asked if she had Massachusetts plates on her car. Boroski responded that she had New Hampshire plates, but this did not deter her attacker, who proceeded to stab her twenty-seven times before driving away and leaving her to die. Boroski managed to return to her car and drive on New Hampshire Route 32 toward a friend's house for help. As she neared the house, she noticed a vehicle driving in front of her and realized that it was her attacker's Jeep. Boroski finally reached her friend's home at which the occupants immediately came to her aid. Her attacker apparently performed a U-turn and slowly passed by the house as Boroski was tended to before speeding away into the night. Boroski was treated at a local hospital, where it was determined that the attack had resulted in a severed jugular vein, two collapsed lungs, a kidney laceration and severed tendons in her knees and thumb. Fortunately, Boroski's baby survived, although not without complications; Boroski's daughter would later be diagnosed with mild cerebral palsy. Boroski was able to provide authorities with a composite sketch and the first three characters of the attacker's license plate. However, the killings ceased following the Boroski attack and the case went cold, with Boroski being the sole survivor of the killer.

=== Possible ===
- On June 11, 1968, at approximately 7:10 a.m., 15-year-old Joanne Dunham was last seen while walking from her home at Raiche Mobile Homes in Charlestown, New Hampshire, to her bus stop on her way to school. Her body was found at 4:15 p.m. the following day on a roped off dirt road on Quaker City Road in Unity, New Hampshire. An autopsy determined that she had died of asphyxiation.
- On October 5, 1982, 76-year-old Sylvia Gray was found bludgeoned and stabbed to death in a wooded area, a few hundred yards from her home in Plainfield, New Hampshire, a day after having been reported missing.
- On May 20, 1984, 16-year-old Heidi Lee Martin went for a jog in Hartland, Vermont, on Martinsville Road. The next day, her body was found in a swampy area behind Hartland Elementary School. She had been stabbed to death. 21-year-old Delbert Tallman confessed to the crime and was tried; however, he later recanted his confession and was acquitted. Her case remains unsolved. Nearly three years later, Agnew's body would be found approximately a mile from where Martin was discovered.
- On July 22, 1984, 26-year-old Ellen Ruth Fried—supervising nurse at Valley Regional Hospital—was last seen making a late-night stop at around 2 a.m. to use a payphone at Leo's Market in Claremont, New Hampshire. She spoke on the phone for about an hour with her sister, mentioning that a car had pulled into the parking lot. Fried briefly stepped away from the phone to see whether her car would start, and resumed the call for a few more minutes. The next day, Fried failed to report to work and her car was found abandoned on Jarvis Road, a few miles away from the location of the payphone. Her skeletal remains were found in a wooded area near the banks of the Sugar River on September 19, 1985. Post-mortem examination revealed evidence of multiple stab wounds and probable sexual assault.
- On June 20, 1986, 38-year-old Steven Hill was last seen retrieving his paycheck from his employer in Lebanon, New Hampshire. On July 15, Hill's body was found with multiple stab wounds in Hartland, across the Connecticut River from where Gray's body had been found four years earlier.
- On July 25, 1989, 14-year-old Carrie Moss of New Boston, New Hampshire, left her parents' home to visit friends in Goffstown and disappeared. Almost exactly two years later, on July 24, 1991, her skeletal remains were found in a wooded area in New Boston. While her cause of death could not be determined, she was thought to be the victim of a homicide.

== Possible suspects ==
=== Michael Nicholaou ===
Around 2006, private investigator Lynn-Marie Carty proposed that Michael Nicholaou, who shot his estranged wife and stepdaughter before killing himself on New Year's Eve 2005, could have been the Connecticut River Valley Killer. While initially stating that Nicholaou could be a suspect, attack survivor Jane Boroski stated in an interview for the Dark Valley Podcast that she does not believe that Michael Nicholaou was her attacker.

== See also ==
- List of serial killers in the United States
- Gary Schaefer, convicted Vermont serial killer operating at the same time and area
