= Kentucky State Penitentiary =

Maximum security prison located in Eddyville, Kentucky

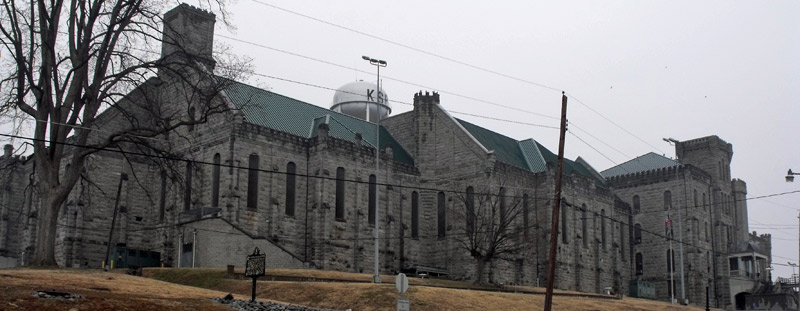

- Location in Kentucky
- Location: Eddyville, Kentucky; 37°02′53″N 88°04′35″W
- Status: Operational
- Security class: Maximum, Supermax, Minimum (outside main facility)
- Population: 856 (2015)
- Opened: 1889
- Managed by: Kentucky Department of Corrections
- Warden: Laura Plappert

The Kentucky State Penitentiary (KSP), also known as the "Castle on the Cumberland", is a maximum security and supermax prison with capacity for 856 prisoners located in Eddyville, Kentucky on Lake Barkley on the Cumberland River, about 4.8 kilometres (3 mi) from downtown Eddyville. It is managed by the Kentucky Department of Corrections. Completed in 1886, it is Kentucky's oldest prison facility and the only commonwealth-owned facility with supermax units. The penitentiary houses Kentucky's male death row inmates and the commonwealth's execution facility. As of 2015, it had approximately 350 staff members and an annual operating budget of $20 million. In most cases, inmates are not sent directly to the penitentiary after sentencing but are sent there because of violent or disruptive behavior committed in other less secure correctional facilities in the commonwealth. This was Kentucky's second penitentiary: the first was made uninhabitable by a flood in 1937.

== History ==
An Act passed both houses of the Kentucky Legislature on April 28, 1884, providing for a branch penitentiary to be located in Eddyville, Kentucky. Former Confederate States brigadier general and Eddyville native Hylan Benton Lyon was the moving force behind the Kentucky State Branch Penitentiary being located in what is now Old Eddyville. A hill overlooking the Cumberland River was chosen as the site for the new prison. Construction of the Kentucky State Branch Penitentiary began in 1884, using massive limestone blocks quarried from a site down the Cumberland. Italian stonemasons were recruited to erect the original buildings, which resemble medieval castles.

=== Commissioners ===
In 1880, three Prison Commissioners were appointed to find a location for a branch penitentiary:

- Judge Richard H. Stanton (1812–1891)
- Hylan Benton Lyon (1836–1907)
- William Morgan Beckner, (1841–1910)

== Name change ==
A part of the 1910 reform bill was to separate convicts by age and crime. All convicts under 30 years of age should be kept in a reformatory and those over 30 years of age should be kept in a penitentiary. The "Branch Penitentiary" had been built in Eddyville, Lyon County, and officially opened December 24, 1890 to ease the overcrowding of the Frankfort Penitentiary. The 1910 reform bill also stated that the electric chair should be housed in a penitentiary and a death house built. Frankfort Penitentiary did not want it. Frankfort didn't have the room nor did they want the curiosity seekers. In 1912 The Frankfort Penitentiary officially became the Kentucky State Reformatory and the Branch Penitentiary became the Kentucky State Penitentiary.

Kentucky State Penitentiary – Kentucky Department of Corrections

=== Construction ===
The "Branch Penitentiary" construction started 1884 and was completed the end of 1890. Eddyville Branch Penitentiary completed and turned over to the State December 24, 1890. A total of $484,143.93 was appropriated by the Legislature for their construction, of which $470,753.41 was expended. Capacity when finished: 1,000.

=== Founding ===
Before the penitentiary was built, prison life in Kentucky was horrific. An 1875 study showed that 20 percent of the inmates in the Kentucky State Prison had pneumonia and seventy-five percent had scurvy. The prison was a place of "slime covered walls, open sewage, and graveyard coughs [4]." Approximately seventy of the one-thousand prisoners had died in 1875. Prison life was something that Kentucky officials had really never focused on until Governor Luke P. Blackburn. He was elected governor in 1879 and immediately convinced the legislature to approve of a new prison.

=== 1889–1908 ===
By 1889, the penitentiary was overcrowded. The General Assembly allowed some inmates to work outside of prison walls, sometimes even unsupervised. In the first few years, around half of the fifty inmates working outside of the prison managed to escape. Abuse rates by the guards and over-seers against the prisoners were at their highest ever, mainly because no one was supervising the handling of the prisoners. Finally, in the early 1890s, this law was abolished and all inmates were forced to stay in the penitentiary. It was almost full immediately.

=== 1909–1987 ===
In 1909, a law was created so that the inmates were no longer required to wear stripes. Inmates would wear baggy denim pants and jackets, cloth hats, and cotton shirts. They also would have numbers stenciled on their backs. Although this was passed, the ball and chain would still be used as punishment for prison offenders until 1940. In the 1940s, the prison began to get rid of all of the convicts under age eighteen. Most of them were sent to the reformatory. The main issue with the Kentucky State Penitentiary in this period was the correctional officer force, always low in numbers and low-paid.

The electric chair was installed at Eddyville penitentiary September 1910. The Frankfort Penitentiary would soon be called Reformatory.

The penitentiary was listed on the National Register of Historic Places in 1981 as part of the Old Eddyville Historic District.

=== From 1988 ===
On June 17, 1988, eight convicts, three being murderers on death row, escaped from the Kentucky State Penitentiary. This occurred at about 2 a.m. sneaking around the fires set by other inmates. The inmates sawed through cell bars, walked through the cell-house doors, and climbed approximately thirty feet to a window using an electrical extension cord. On July 1, 1997, Kentucky executed its first inmate in thirty five years. Harold McQueen, 44 years old, was convicted in 1981 of murdering Rebecca O' Hearn, a convenience store clerk, during a robbery that netted him $1,500. Harold McQueen was electrocuted at 12:07 a.m. Over one hundred death penalty opponents and twenty five supporters of capital punishment protested outside of the penitentiary.

On November 21, 2008, death row inmate Marco Allen Chapman, convicted of murdering two northern Kentucky children in 2002, was executed by lethal injection, the most recent at Kentucky State Penitentiary.

On January 13, 2014, inmate James Kenneth Embry Jr., died of starvation and dehydration following a hunger strike. In March, following inquiries by the Associated Press, Kentucky Corrections Commissioner LaDonna Thompson asked the state Attorney General's office to review Embry's death.

In July 2016 author Steve E. Asher published Hauntings of the Kentucky State Penitentiary, a book of accounts of paranormal activity at KSP.

On July 1, 2018, DeEdra Hart was named the first female warden in the history of the Kentucky State Penitentiary. Hart previously served as warden of the Green River Correctional Complex and as deputy warden of the Western Kentucky Correctional Complex

The prison is currently under the administration of Warden Laura Plappert who was appointed in 2024 after serving as Deputy Warden at KSP and, prior to that, Deputy Warden at the Luther Luckett Correctional Complex in LaGrange.

== Distinctions ==
Five distinct custody levels make up the KSP inmate population. Inmates wear a specific color uniform based on their custody level. Those levels and their respective uniform colors are:

- General population – khaki
- Protective custody – kelly green
- Administrative segregation – canary yellow
- Death row – scarlet red
- Minimum security – dark green (see below)

In addition to the main facility, there is a small minimum security unit outside the walls of the institution whose inmates have work assignments throughout the facility & grounds. Inmates in the minimum security unit are given additional privileges, including fishing in Lake Barkley during their spare time.

== Notable Inmates ==
- Stanley Dishon - Murdered his niece Jessica Dishon in 1999. Faced charges for her murder along with three counts of sexual abuse. In 2015, he took the Alford plea. Under the terms of the plea agreement, he received a 20-year sentence, with a possibility for parole in 16 years. His maximum sentence will conclude in 2033.
- Fleece Johnson – Former inmate who became known through an interview for the prison documentary television series Lockup while incarcerated at Kentucky State Penitentiary; the interview was later parodied on The Boondocks.
- Gary Schaefer - Convicted child murderer, kidnapper and suspected serial killer from Vermont. Moved to Kentucky State Penitentiary in 1985 from Vermont as Schaefer required a facility with higher security than Vermont could provide. Schaefer died at the prison in 2023.

=== Death row ===
- Ralph Baze – convicted of killing two police officers in 1992.
- Victor Dewayne Taylor – perpetrator of the 1984 Trinity murders.
- Larry Lamont White – serial killer who murdered three females from June to July 1983.

=== Executed ===
- Harold McQueen Jr. – executed on July 1, 1997, for the 1980 murder of Rebecca O'Hearn.
- Edward Lee Harper Jr. – executed on May 25, 1999, for the 1982 murders of his parents, Alice and Edward Lee Harper Sr.
- Marco Allen Chapman – executed on November 21, 2008, for the 2002 murders of Chelbi and Cody Marksberry.
