= Capital punishment in Kentucky =

Capital punishment is a legal penalty in the U.S. state of Kentucky.

Despite remaining a legal penalty, there have been no executions in Kentucky since 2008, and only three since 1976. The most recent execution was of Marco Allen Chapman, who was executed for two murders.

Capital punishment in Kentucky has been indefinitely suspended by an order from the Franklin County Circuit Court since 2009. The Kentucky Supreme Court most recently confirmed the capital punishment suspension order in September 2026.

== Legal process ==
When the Commonwealth's Attorney seeks the death penalty, the sentence of death must be recommended by a unanimous vote of the trial jury.

Kentucky is the only state without provision on what happens if the penalty phase of the trial results in a hung jury. Thus, the Kentucky Supreme Court ruled that in cases that end with a hung jury, the judge must order a penalty retrial, applying the common law rule for mistrials.

All sentences of death are automatically appealed to the Kentucky Supreme Court. Death sentences shall, in theory, be carried out on the fifth Friday following the affirmation of the sentence by the Supreme Court. However, if the sentence is not carried out because of stays or any other reason, the governor may appoint another day of execution and may continue to do so until the sentence is carried into effect. The governor also has the sole power of clemency with respect to death sentences.

Among Kentucky death row inmates is Ralph Baze, who unsuccessfully challenged Kentucky lethal injection protocol before the U.S. Supreme Court in the 2008 case Baze v. Rees, which caused the staying of all executions in the entire United States between September 2007 and April 2008. Baze was sentenced to death for murdering Powell County Sheriff Steve Bennett and Deputy Arthur Briscoe in 1992.

== Capital crimes ==
The aggravating factors making murder, kidnapping, or armed robbery punishable by death are the following:

1. The murder or kidnapping was committed by a person with a prior record of conviction for a capital offense, or the offense of murder was committed by a person who has a substantial history of serious assaultive criminal convictions;
2. The murder was committed while the offender was engaged in the commission of arson in the first degree, robbery in the first degree, burglary in the first degree, rape in the first degree, or sodomy in the first degree;
3. The murderer, or the offender committed kidnapping or armed robbery knowingly created a great risk of death to more than one person in a public place by means of a weapon of mass destruction, weapon, or other device which would normally be hazardous to the lives of more than one person;
4. The offender committed the offense of murder for himself or another, for the purpose of receiving money or any other thing of monetary value, or for other profit;
5. The murder was committed by a person who was a prisoner and the victim was a prison employee engaged at the time of the act in the performance of his duties;
6. The offender's act or acts of killing were intentional and resulted in multiple deaths;
7. The offender's act of killing was intentional and the victim was a state or local public official or police officer, sheriff, or deputy sheriff engaged at the time of the act in the lawful performance of his duties;
8. The offender murdered the victim when an emergency protective order or a domestic violence order was in effect, or when any other order designed to protect the victim from the offender, such as an order issued as a condition of a bond, conditional release, probation, parole, or pretrial diversion, was in effect.
9. The offender's act of killing was intentional and the victim was less than 12 years of age.

Some of these aggravated factors apply to the offenses of armed robbery and kidnapping. However, the death penalty for these offenses is no longer allowed, as they have been declared unconstitutional since the 2008 U.S. Supreme Court case Kennedy v. Louisiana.

== Location and method ==
The Kentucky State Penitentiary in Eddyville houses all of Kentucky's male death row inmates. Female death row inmates are housed at the Kentucky Correctional Institute for Women in unincorporated Shelby County, near Pewee Valley. All executions occur at the Kentucky State Penitentiary.

The method of execution is lethal injection, but a prisoner condemned before March 31, 1998, may choose to be electrocuted instead. Electrocution is also authorized in the event that lethal injection is found unconstitutional by a court.

== See also ==
- List of people executed in Kentucky
- List of people executed in Kentucky (pre-1972)
- List of death row inmates in the United States § Kentucky
- Crime in Kentucky
- Law of Kentucky
