= Eddyville, Kentucky =

- City
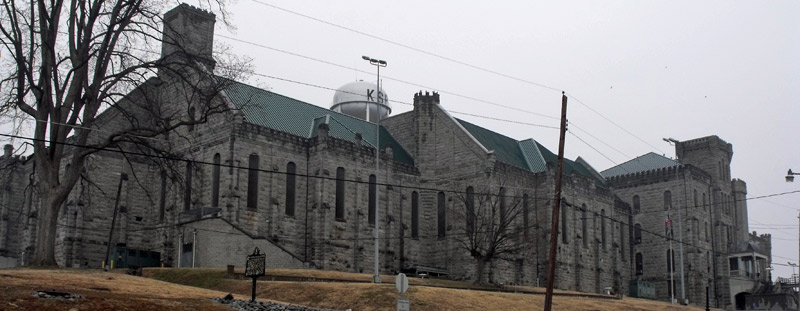
- Kentucky State Penitentiary

- Location in Lyon County, Kentucky
- Coordinates: 37°04′33″N 88°04′37″W
- Country: United States
- State: Kentucky
- County: Lyon

Area
  - Total: 7.71 sq mi (19.98 km^{2})
  - Land: 6.90 sq mi (17.87 km^{2})
  - Water: 0.81 sq mi (2.11 km^{2})
- Elevation: 436 ft (133 m)

Population (2020)
  - Total: 2,375
  - Estimate (2022): 2,429
  - Density: 344.3/sq mi (132.94/km^{2})
- Time zone: UTC-6 (Central (CST))
  - Summer (DST): UTC-5 (CDT)
- ZIP code: 42038
- Area codes: 270 & 364
- FIPS code: 21-23824
- GNIS feature ID: 2403538
- Website: eddyvilleky.org

Eddyville is a home rule-class city in Lyon County, Kentucky, United States, of which it is also the county seat. The population was 2,375 at the 2020 census, up from 2,350 in 2000. The Kentucky State Penitentiary is located at Eddyville. The town is a tourist attraction because of its access to nearby Lake Barkley.

== History ==
Eddyville, the seat of Lyon County, was settled around 1798 and named for the eddies in the nearby Cumberland River. It became the seat of Livingston County when the county was formed in 1799; then the seat of Caldwell County upon its formation in 1809; and finally the seat of Lyon County upon its establishment in 1854. Thus, it holds the distinction of being the only city in Kentucky to have served as the county seat of three separate counties. The Eddyville post office opened in 1801.

The modern steel producing technique, known as the Bessemer Process, was first discovered by William Kelly in Eddyville in the 1850s.

Throughout Kentucky, Eddyville is best known as a metonym for the Kentucky State Penitentiary, although the prison itself is actually 3 miles (5 km) south of the present town on the shore of Lake Barkley in "Old Eddyville" on KY 730. Taking six years to build (1884–1890), the massive stone prison structure towers over Lake Barkley and is sometimes called "The Castle on the Cumberland." Its electric chair has had a long history of use, dating to the period before 1936 when executions were still publicly conducted in Kentucky for some crimes (e.g. rape as in the case of Rainey Bethea) while electrocutions at Eddyville were strictly reserved for others (e.g., murder). Executions are still held at the prison, although there have only been three since 1976 and only one since 1999. The primary method has been changed to lethal injection.

Following the completion of Kentucky Dam in the 1940s, rumors began that a dam would be built on the lower Cumberland. This meant relocating Eddyville and Kuttawa. By the mid-1950s, the construction plans were confirmed. The U.S. Army Corps of Engineers began surveying for the construction of Barkley Dam. This was met with anger from the local population.

The situation was resolved by Lee S. Jones, a native of Lyon County who had attended law school and settled in Louisville, where he had gained a reputation as one of the best "tax lawyers" and made his wealth. Jones had purchased farms in the Fairview community (which is now the site of Eddyville). He came to the Eddyville City Council and presented his plan: each person owning land in the towns (Eddyville and Kuttawa) to be flooded would receive a free lot in the new Eddyville site. This also applied to businesses.

Eddyville residents accepted his offer and on August 13, 1959, the official plat for the new town was filed with the county court clerk. The plat included 254 residential lots, 46 business lots, 28 acres (110,000 m^{2}) for construction of a school and campus, city park, courthouse, health office, water works, and location of streets.

August 28, 1959, was designated as "Dedication and Free Deed Day" at the new site. A large group of people gathered for the event, which was held in a field, close to the site of the current post office. Mr. Jones handed the first deed to Boyce and Lillian Yates, then presented approximately 60 more residential lots. The first house to be built in the new town was the home of Mr. and Mrs. J. I. Moore. The first business to be built was the Kentucky Utilities office. During the time of building, Eddyville was "booming" and, with the impoundment of Lake Barkley in the 1960s, tourists began making their way into the area for the abundance of fish and boating. However, the tourist influx wasn't sufficient to create a steady economic growth. Although campgrounds and marinas were springing up around the lake, the city was struggling.

Construction of the West Kentucky Outlet Mall was launched in December 1988. Three brothers, Bob, Darrell and Ben Jent, purchased a tract of land in the city limits of Eddyville and started construction of a mall, which opened the following fall with ten stores. Within a short time the mall would boast a total of nearly 50 stores. The opening of the mall brought a surge of progress to Eddyville, as a variety of businesses began to move into the city. For the first time in the town's history, people could choose their favorite restaurant, motel, clothing store or other places to shop—all without leaving town. It has been said the mall did more for the progress of Eddyville than any other endeavor since the establishment of the town in 1799, with the possible exception of the building of the Kentucky State Penitentiary. The town was listed as the second fastest-growing area in Kentucky in 1997 based on tourism.

The mall has since suffered severe economic troubles, and few stores are currently left.

A regional water park, Venture River, has operated seasonally in Eddyville since 1992.

Hundreds of homes and businesses were damaged or destroyed in Eddyville and Lyon County from an EF4 tornado that ripped through western Kentucky on December 10–11, 2021. Later, an EF3 tornado would touchdown near Eddyville on May 26, 2024, and cause damage in areas previously affected by the western Kentucky tornado outbreak on December 10–11.

== Geography ==
Eddyville is located in north-central Lyon County and is bordered to the west by Kuttawa and to the south by Lake Barkley on the Cumberland River.

Two Interstate highways, I-24 and I-69, intersect in Eddyville. I-24 leads southeast 102 miles (164 km) to Nashville, Tennessee, and west 34 miles (55 km) to Paducah, while I-69 leads northeast 94 miles (151 km) to Evansville, Indiana, and southwest 66 miles (106 km) to the Tennessee border at Fulton. The two highways lead west together from Eddyville for 16 miles (26 km) before splitting near Calvert City. U.S. Route 62 passes through the center of Eddyville, leading northeast 11 miles (18 km) to Princeton and southwest 4 miles (6 km) into Kuttawa. U.S. Route 641 passes through Eddyville with US 62 but splits off at the northeast border of the city and leads north 18 miles (29 km) to its northern terminus in Marion.

Mineral Mound State Park occupies a peninsula in Lake Barkley in the southern part of the city. The park, golf course, and peninsula extend southwest into the city limits of Kuttawa. The Kentucky State Penitentiary, also fronting on Lake Barkley, is within the southernmost extent of the Eddyville limits, 5 miles (8 km) by road south of the center of town.

According to the United States Census Bureau, Eddyville has a total area of 7.7 square miles (20.0 km^{2}), of which 6.9 square miles (17.9 km^{2}) are land and 0.81 square miles (2.1 km^{2}), or 10.56%, are water.

== Demographics ==
Historical population
Census	Pop.	Note	%±
1800	69		—
1840	167		—
1860	599		—
1870	386		−35.6%
1880	390		1.0%
1890	680		74.4%
1900	1,210		77.9%
1910	1,442		19.2%
1920	1,182		−18.0%
1930	1,990		68.4%
1940	2,407		21.0%
1950	1,840		−23.6%
1960	1,858		1.0%
1970	1,981		6.6%
1980	1,949		−1.6%
1990	1,889		−3.1%
2000	2,350		24.4%
2010	2,554		8.7%
2020	2,375		−7.0%
2022 (est.)	2,429		2.3%
U.S. Decennial Census

=== 2020 census ===
As of the 2020 census, Eddyville had a population of 2,375. The median age was 41.7 years. 13.3% of residents were under the age of 18 and 16.5% of residents were 65 years of age or older. For every 100 females there were 182.4 males, and for every 100 females age 18 and over there were 200.7 males age 18 and over.

0.0% of residents lived in urban areas, while 100.0% lived in rural areas.

There were 750 households in Eddyville, of which 24.9% had children under the age of 18 living in them. Of all households, 38.0% were married-couple households, 20.7% were households with a male householder and no spouse or partner present, and 36.3% were households with a female householder and no spouse or partner present. About 38.9% of all households were made up of individuals and 19.4% had someone living alone who was 65 years of age or older.

There were 906 housing units, of which 17.2% were vacant. The homeowner vacancy rate was 5.9% and the rental vacancy rate was 8.2%.

Racial composition as of the 2020 census
Race	Number	Percent
White	1,940	81.7%
Black or African American	313	13.2%
American Indian and Alaska Native	8	0.3%
Asian	12	0.5%
Native Hawaiian and Other Pacific Islander	0	0.0%
Some other race	41	1.7%
Two or more races	61	2.6%
Hispanic or Latino (of any race)	54	2.3%

=== 2010 census ===
The 2010 census reported a record high total population of 2,554 people. Total households reported were 911, with 57.8% of those being family households and 42.2% being non-family households. Of those recorded in the census, 84.9% were white, 13% were black, 1.2% were Hispanic, and 2.2% other race. The median age was 41.6 years, with males comprising 54.2% and females 45.8%. 3.8% were under 5 years old, 12.8% for 5–17 years, 7.9% for 18–24 years, 31.2% for 25–44 years, 26.7% for 45–64 years, and 17.6% for 65+ years.

=== 2000 census ===
As of the 2000 census, there were 2,350 people, 733 households, and 452 families residing in the city. The population density was 351.2 inhabitants per square mile (135.6/km^{2}). There were 906 housing units at an average density of 131.8 per square mile (50.9/km^{2}). The racial makeup of the city was 85.96% White, 12.72% African American, 0.26% Native American, 0.13% Asian, 0.30% from other races, and 0.64% from two or more races. Hispanic or Latino of any race were 0.98% of the population.

24.4% of households had children under the age of 18 living with them, 48.8% were married couples living together, 10.9% had a female householder with no husband present, and 38.2% were non-families. 36.3% of all households were made up of individuals, and 17.5% had someone living alone who was 65 years of age or older. The average household size was 2.10 and the average family size was 2.71.

In the city, the population was spread out, with 13.3% under the age of 18, 9.8% from 18 to 24, 40.5% from 25 to 44, 22.7% from 45 to 64, and 13.6% who were 65 years of age or older. The median age was 38 years. For every 100 females, there were 182.8 males. For every 100 females age 18 and over, there were 197.4 males.

The median income for a household in the city was $40,500. Males had a median income of $37,778 versus $21,845 for females. The per capita income for the city was $14,591. About 11.9% of families and 14.0% of the population were below the poverty line, including 15.2% of those under age 18 and 16.2% of those age 65 or over.

== Education ==
Lyon County Public Schools is the public school district covering the entire county. The 2024–2025 school year recorded 884 students in grades K-12 with a student-teacher ratio of 15 to 1. According to state test scores, 60% of students are at least proficient in math and 65% in reading.

Eddyville has a lending library, the Lyon County Public Library.

== Notable natives and residents ==
- Francis Gracey Childers, American brigadier general and politician
- Joe Fulks, NBA player
- William Kelly, Inventor
- Chittenden Lyon, congressman
- Hylan B. Lyon, Confederate brigadier general
- Matthew Lyon, congressman
- Willis Benson Machen, Confederate congressman, U.S. senator
- Travis Perry, all-time leading career scorer in Kentucky boys' high school basketball
- John Long Routt, Governor of Colorado
