= 1998 Jefferson County Judge/Executive election =

- November 3, 1998
Nominee	Rebecca Jackson	Fred Cowan
Party	Republican	Democratic
Popular vote	112,290	101,912
Percentage	52.42%	47.58%
Judge/Executive before election
Dave Armstrong
Democratic
Elected Judge/Executive
Rebecca Jackson
Republican

The 1998 Jefferson County Judge/Executive election was held on November 3, 1998. The Republican and Democratic primary elections were held on May 26.

Incumbent Democratic Judge/Executive Dave Armstrong, who was elected to a second term in 1993, declined to seek reelection. He instead ran for mayor of Louisville. He was succeeded by Republican Rebecca Jackson, the incumbent Jefferson County Clerk. Jackson defeated Fred Cowan, the Democratic candidate and former Kentucky Attorney General. This was the final Judge/Executive election before the 2002 merged metro government of Louisville and Jefferson County, after which the duties of the Judge/Executive were reduced to a largely ceremonial capacity.

== Democratic primary ==
=== Candidates ===
==== Nominee ====
- Fred Cowan, Kentucky Attorney General (1988–1992) and state representative from the 32nd district (1982–1987)

==== Eliminated in primary ====
- Joe Corradino, engineering consultant and later Jefferson County Commissioner (1999)
- Rick D'Auria, coin laundry attendant

=== Results ===
Democratic primary results
Party	Candidate	Votes	%
Democratic	Fred Cowan	39,657	55.10
Democratic	Joe Corradino	29,275	40.68
Democratic	Rick D'Auria	3,035	4.22
Total votes		71,967	100.0

== Republican primary ==
=== Candidates ===
==== Nominee ====
- Rebecca Jackson, Jefferson County Clerk (1990–1999)

==== Eliminated in primary ====
- Tommy Klein, perennial candidate

=== Results ===
Republican primary results
Party	Candidate	Votes	%
Republican	Rebecca Jackson	21,976	93.00
Republican	Tommy Klein	1,653	7.00
Total votes		23,629	100.0

== General election ==
=== Results ===
1998 Jefferson County Judge/Executive election
Party	Candidate	Votes	%
Republican	Rebecca Jackson	112,290	52.42
Democratic	Fred Cowan	101,912	47.58
Total votes		214,202	100.0
Republican gain from Democratic			
