= Albert Mohler =

American evangelical theologian (born 1959)

Al Mohler
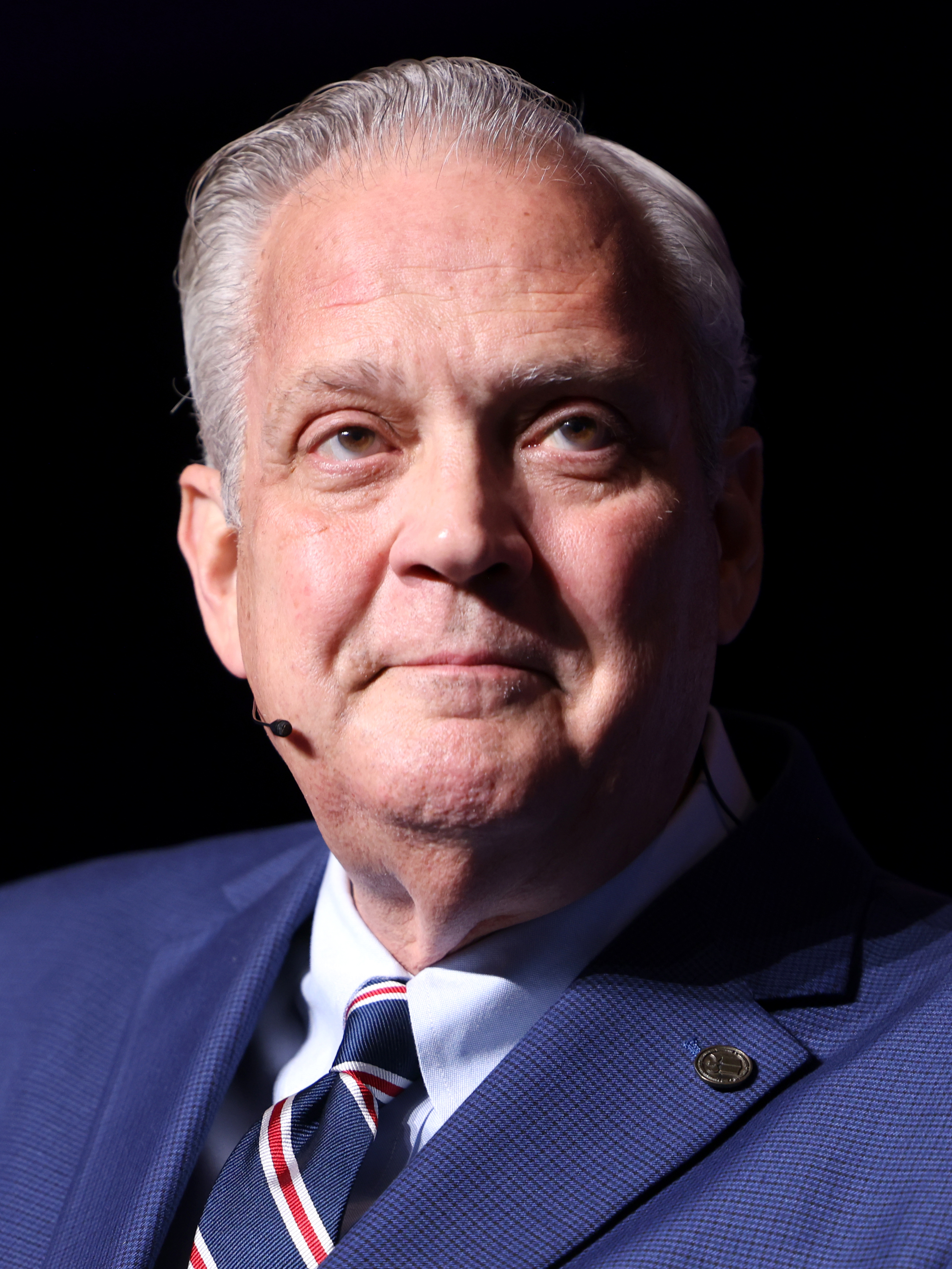
- Mohler in 2026

9th President of the Southern Baptist Theological Seminary
- Incumbent
- Assumed office March 26, 1993
- Vice President: Paul Akin
- Preceded by: Roy Honeycutt

Personal details
- Born: Richard Albert Mohler Jr. October 19, 1959 (age 67) Lakeland, Florida, U.S.
- Spouse: Mary Kahler
- Children: 2
- Education: Florida Atlantic University; Samford University (BA); Southern Baptist Theological Seminary (MDiv, PhD)
- Website: Official website

Richard Albert Mohler Jr. (born October 19, 1959) is an American evangelical theologian, the ninth president of The Southern Baptist Theological Seminary in Louisville, Kentucky, and host of the podcast The Briefing, where he gives a daily analysis of news and events from a Christian worldview.

== Education and personal life ==
Mohler was born on October 19, 1959, in Lakeland, Florida. During his Lakeland years, he attended Southside Baptist Church. Mohler attended college at Florida Atlantic University in Boca Raton in Palm Beach County as a Faculty Scholar. He then received a Bachelor of Arts from Samford University, a private, coeducational Baptist-affiliated college in Birmingham, Alabama. His Master of Divinity and Doctor of Philosophy degrees in systematic and historical theology were conferred by the Southern Baptist Theological Seminary.

== Career ==
In addition to his presidency at SBTS, Mohler was the host of The Albert Mohler Program, a nationwide radio show "devoted to engaging contemporary culture with Christian beliefs." He currently produces a weekday podcast on the news, The Briefing, in which he provides commentary on current events from a Christian point of view, often providing a historical background as well. He also regularly broadcasts interviews with various different people on a podcast called Thinking in Public. He is former vice chairman of the board of Focus on the Family and a member of the Council on Biblical Manhood and Womanhood. Mohler has presented lectures or addresses at a variety of conservative evangelical universities.

Mohler served as editor of The Christian Index, the biweekly newsletter of the Georgia Baptist Convention. From 1985 to 1993 he was Associate Editor of the bi-monthly Preaching Magazine. Mohler also served on the Advisory Council for the 2001 English Standard Version (ESV) of the Bible. Mohler previously blogged on Crosswalk.com, a web site maintained by Salem Web Network of Richmond, Virginia. Mohler currently blogs on his website, where his podcasts can also be listened to for free.

In 2018, Mohler labeled turmoil in the Southern Baptist Convention as the SBC's "own horrifying #MeToo moment" and said it stemmed from "an unorganized conspiracy of silence" about sexual misconduct and abuse. He wrote that the SBC's "issues are far deeper and wider" than the controversy surrounding Paige Patterson, who'd been moved that day from president to president emeritus of Southwestern Baptist Theological Seminary.

In early 2019, reports of sexual abuse by church leaders and volunteers shook the Southern Baptist Convention, and Mohler called for independent third-party investigations. Just days after the Houston Chronicle's 2019 report of allegations of hundreds of sexual abuse cases (some of which were not reported to law enforcement), Mohler apologized in an interview with the newspaper for supporting a religious leader who was accused of helping conceal sexual abuses at his former church. Some have lauded Mohler, while others have questioned the timing and motivations of these comments. One day after Mohler's remarks to the Houston Chronicle, his Southern Baptist Theological Seminary office released a related statement by him.

== Southern Baptist Theological Seminary ==
Mohler joined the staff of the Southern Baptist Theological Seminary in Louisville, Kentucky, in 1983 as Coordinator of Foundation Support. In 1987, he became Director of Capital Funding, a post he held until 1989. From 1983 to 1989, while still a student, he had served as assistant to then-President Roy Honeycutt. In February 1993, Mohler was appointed the ninth President of the seminary by the institution's board of trustees to succeed Honeycutt.

== Theology and other faiths ==
Mohler is an Evangelical and an exclusivist, a position that holds Christ is the only means of salvation. While identifying as an evangelical, he refused to sign the "Evangelical Manifesto" because he believed the definition of that term was so broad as to be meaningless. As a Calvinist, Mohler believes that human salvation is a free gift from God which cannot be earned by human action or will and is only given to the elect. He has publicly advanced this position with respect to Judaism, Islam, and Catholicism. In 2006 he stated "any belief system, any world view, whether it's Zen Buddhism or Hinduism or dialectical materialism for that matter, Marxism, that keeps persons captive and keeps them from coming to faith in the Lord Jesus Christ, yes, is a demonstration of Satanic power." He believes Muslims are motivated by demonic power and in the months after the September 11, 2001 attacks, Mohler characterized Islamic views of Jesus as false and destructive:

...as a Christian theologian, the biggest problem with Islamic theology is that it kills the soul. The bigger problem with Islam is not that there are those who will kill the body in its name, but that it lies about God [and] presents a false gospel, an un-gospel...

In a 2003 interview with Time magazine, Mohler further argued that faith must be differentiated from ideas of race or ethnicity:

The secular world tends to look at Iraq and say, well, it's Muslim, and that's just a fact, and any Christian influence would just be a form of Western imperialism. The Christian has to look at Iraq and see persons desperately in need of the gospel. Compelled by the love and command of Christ, the Christian will seek to take that gospel in loving and sensitive, but very direct, ways to the people of Iraq.

== Media appearances ==
Mohler appeared on MSNBC's Donahue on August 20, 2002. The subject was Christian evangelization of Jews. Mohler and Michael L. Brown, a Messianic Jew, debated this subject as well as Mohler's insistence that salvation lies exclusively in the personal acceptance of Christ before the afterlife with Donahue, a Catholic, and Rabbi Shmuley Boteach, an Orthodox Jew.

On April 15, 2003, Mohler was interviewed by Time on the subject of evangelizing Iraqi Muslims in the form of Christian aid groups.

On May 5, 2003, Mohler appeared on NPR's Fresh Air with Terry Gross to discuss the issue of evangelization of the Iraqis. At issue was whether the coupling of evangelizing with basic human aid relief might be perceived as aggressive or coercive by the Iraqi people, and whether such a perception, if widespread, might place other relief workers in jeopardy. Mohler argued that biblical, evangelical Christianity is not uniquely American, but exists as a movement throughout the world, so that Christian witnessing is not, in his view, to be interpreted as a move on the part of any single nation against the religion of another. At the same time, however, Mohler acknowledged the need for "sensitivity", and distanced himself from the idea that religion coerced. When pressed, Mohler expressed support for the idea of religious freedom as a theoretical matter of law.

On December 18, 2004, Mohler debated retired Episcopal bishop John Shelby Spong on Faith Under Fire, a program hosted by Lee Strobel and appearing on PAX, a Christian television network. The subject was the historicity and truthfulness of the Bible.

On December 19, 2013, Mohler appeared on CNN to discuss the controversy surrounding comments made by Phil Robertson of Duck Dynasty. GLAAD National Spokesman Wilson Cruz was also on the program.

== Speaking engagements ==
On November 8–9, 2004, Mohler spoke at the annual meeting of the Florida Baptist State Convention.

On May 21, 2005, Mohler gave the commencement address at Union University in Jackson, Tennessee. Mohler told graduates they could display the glory of God by telling and defending the truth, sharing the gospel, engaging the culture, changing the world, loving the church and showing the glory of God in their own lives.

On February 25, 2014, Mohler delivered a Forum Lecture in the Marriott Center Arena at Brigham Young University in Provo, Utah. The title of Mohler's lecture was, "Strengthen the Things that Remain: Human Dignity, Human Rights, and Human Flourishing in a Dangerous Age."

== Justice Sunday ==
Mohler was on the board of directors of Focus on the Family. In this role he was one of the principal organizers of Justice Sunday, a nationally televised event broadcast from Highview Baptist Church, in Louisville on April 24, 2005. Mohler shared the stage with Charles Colson and Focus on the Family founder James Dobson. US Senate Majority Leader Bill Frist appeared at the event via videotape. Another host of the program was Family Research Council president Tony Perkins.

The purpose of the broadcast was to mobilize the conservative base in lobbying the United States Senate to curtail debate on the nominations to the federal judiciary made by George W. Bush.

We want to communicate to all that we are not calling for persons merely to be moral. We want them to be believers in the Lord Jesus Christ, because we don't just need instruction, we need salvation. [...] For far too long, Christians have been concerned to elect the right people to office, and then go back home. We have learned the importance of the electoral process, and yet we're also discovering that that third branch of government, the judiciary, is so very, very important. We have been watching court cases come down the line. In 1973, Roe v. Wade [declared] a woman's right to an abortion. [...] By no stretch of the imagination did the founders of this nation and the framers of that document intend for anyone to be able to read those words and find a right to kill unborn children.

— Albert Mohler, April 24, 2005

== Theological views ==
=== On Catholicism ===
Mohler believes the Catholic Church is a "false church" that teaches a "false gospel" and regards the Papacy as an illegitimate office. During a March 13, 2014, podcast of The Briefing, Mohler stated that Evangelicals "simply cannot accept the legitimacy of the papacy" and that "to do otherwise would be to compromise Biblical truth and reverse the Reformation." Mohler denounced Pope Francis for his perceived left-leaning leadership. He praised Pope Benedict XVI upon his passing, despite their theological differences, as "a great defender of Western Civilization, shaped by historic Christian presuppositions. His defense of the sanctity of human life and the integrity of marriage and the family were grounded in two great assertions. First, the positive assertion that truth exists and is evident in revelation. Second, that a powerful “dictatorship of relativism” threatens to unravel civilization, truth, and moral authority."

Mohler stated that he was one of the original signatories to the Manhattan Declaration because it is a limited ecumenical statement of Christian conviction on the topics of abortion, euthanasia and gay marriage, and not a wide-ranging theological document that subverts confessional integrity. He emphasized that he signed the document in spite of his deep theological disagreements with the Catholic Church.

=== Family planning ===
Mohler spoke in June 2004, about married adults who choose not to have children:

The Scripture does not even envision married couples who choose not to have children. Christians have bought into this lifestyle and claim childlessness as a legitimate option. It remains a form of rebellion against God's design and order.

Mohler has also been critical of emergency contraceptives that prevent implantation of the fertilized egg, which he believes "involve nothing less than an early abortion."

=== Gender roles and sexuality ===
On February 23, 2024, St. Patrick's Cathedral held a memorial in attendance by over 1000 people for Cecilia Gentili, a transgender activist. Albert Mohler described the service as a "transgender celebration" that "scandalized" the Church.

In 2017, Mohler signed the Nashville Statement.

He said of trans people "We cannot affirm someone in a delusion" when asked whether Christians should use a person's preferred pronouns, while allowing that Christians may use the name by which someone introduces himself or herself.

He opposed the repeal of the US military's "don't ask, don't tell" policy on the grounds of religious liberty.

=== Science ===
Mohler is a young Earth creationist.

=== Yoga ===
According to Mohler, yoga practice is not consistent with Christianity.

When Christians practice yoga, they must either deny the reality of what yoga represents or fail to see the contradictions between their Christian commitments and their embrace of yoga. The contradictions are not few, nor are they peripheral. The bare fact is that yoga is a spiritual discipline by which the adherent is trained to use the body as a vehicle for achieving consciousness of the divine... The embrace of yoga is a symptom of our postmodern spiritual confusion...

After voicing his stance on the topic, Mohler stated that he was "surprised by the depth of the commitment to yoga found on the part of many who identify as Christians".

=== Libertarianism ===
Mohler has argued that libertarianism is idolatrous, and as a comprehensive world view or fundamental guiding principle for human life, is inconsistent with Christian ideals. He is a proponent of personal liberty, but believes such liberties can run into problems when applied in the political sphere. The more limited economic libertarianism, on the other hand, can be consistent with the "comprehensive world view that Christianity puts forward."

== Recognition ==
Christianity Today recognized Mohler as a leader among American evangelicals, and in 2003 Time called him the "reigning intellectual of the evangelical movement in the U.S."

Mohler received the 2023 Boniface Award from the Association of Classical Christian Schools, given to recognize "a public figure who has stood faithfully for Christian truth, beauty, and goodness with grace."

== Selected bibliography ==
=== Books authored by R. Albert Mohler Jr. ===
- Atheism Remix: A Christian Confronts the New Atheists ISBN 978-1-4335-0497-6
- Culture Shift: Engaging Current Issues with Timeless Truth (Today's Critical Concerns) ISBN 978-1-59052-974-4
- He Is Not Silent: Preaching in a Postmodern World ISBN 978-0-8024-5489-8 (September 1, 2008)
- Desire and Deceit: The Real Cost of the New Sexual Tolerance ISBN 978-1-60142-080-0 (September 16, 2008)
- The Conviction to Lead: The 25 Principles for Leadership That Matters, expresses the view that leadership stems from conviction and moral character (2012).
- We Cannot Be Silent: Speaking Truth to a Culture Redefining Sex, Marriage, and the Very Meaning of Right and Wrong ISBN 978-0718032487 (October 27, 2015)
- Acts 1–12 For You, first in a two-part popular-level commentary on the book of Acts ISBN 978-1909919914 (The Good Book Company, 2018)
- The Apostles' Creed: Discovering Authentic Christianity in an Age of Counterfeits, (Thomas Nelson, 2019)
- The Gathering Storm: Secularism, Culture, and the Church ISBN 978-1-4002-2021-2 (Thomas Nelson, 2020))
- The Disappearance of God: Dangerous Beliefs in the New Spiritual Openness Multnomah (May 5, 2009) ISBN 978-1601427403

=== Books edited by R. Albert Mohler Jr. ===
- Henry, Carl Ferdinand Howard (1994), Gods of This Age or God of the Ages? Essays by Carl F. H. Henry, Broadman & Holman Publishers, ISBN 0-8054-1548-3.
- Theological Education in the Evangelical Tradition (Editor, with D. G. Hart) ISBN 0-8010-2061-1

=== Books to which R. Albert Mohler Jr. has contributed ===
- Feed My Sheep: A Passionate Plea for Preaching ISBN 1-57358-144-5
- The Coming Evangelical Crisis: Current Challenges to the Authority of Scripture and the Gospel by R. Kent Hughes (Editor), John MacArthur Jr. (Editor), R. C. Sproul (Editor), Michael S. Horton (Editor), Albert Mohler Jr. (Editor), John H. Armstrong (Editor) (Moody, 1996) ISBN 0-8024-7738-0
- The Compromised Church John H. Armstrong (Editor) (Crossway Books, 1998) ISBN 1-58134-006-0
- Why I Am a Baptist Tom J. Nettles and Russell D. Moore Eds. Chapter 6 (p. 58), entitled "Being Baptist Means Conviction" (Broadman & Holman, 2001) ISBN 0-8054-2426-1
- A Theology For The church Daniel L. Akin (Editor). Conclusion (p. 927) entitled "The Pastor as Theologian" (Broadman & Holman, 2007) ISBN 978-0-8054-2640-3
- Five Views on Biblical Inerrancy by J. Merrick and Stephen M. Garrett, eds. (Zondervan, 2013) ISBN 9780310331360

== See also ==
- Religion and spirituality podcast
