= 1987 Kentucky Attorney General election =

- November 3, 1987
Nominee	Fred Cowan	Chris S. Combs
Party	Democratic	Republican
Popular vote	457,008	196,292
Percentage	69.94%	30.04%
- County results (Note: Pendleton County results were likely flipped when certified.); Cowan: 50–60% 60–70% 70–80% 80–90% 90–100% Combs: 50–60% 60–70% 70–80%
Attorney General before election
David L. Armstrong
Democratic
Elected Attorney General
Fred Cowan
Democratic

The 1987 Kentucky Attorney General election took place on November 3, 1987, to elect the Attorney General of Kentucky. Incumbent Democratic Attorney General David L. Armstrong, who was ineligible for reelection, ran for Lieutenant Governor.

Democratic State Representative Fred Cowan beat Republican nominee and former Estill County attorney Christopher S. Combs, 70% to 30%.

== Democratic primary ==
=== Candidates ===
==== Nominee ====
- Fred Cowan, State Representative from the 32nd district.

==== Eliminated in primary ====
- Todd Hollenbach, former Jefferson County Judge/Executive (1970–1978), candidate for Governor in 1975, Lieutenant Governor in 1979 and 1983, and father of Todd Hollenbach IV.
- Raymond Douglas Kirk, general counsel for the Kentucky Railroad Commission.

=== Results ===
May 26, 1987 Democratic primary
Party	Candidate	Votes	%
Democratic	Fred Cowan	227,504	50.87%
Democratic	Todd Hollenbach	181,696	40.62%
Democratic	Raymond D. Kirk	38,075	8.51%
Total votes		447,275	100.00%

== General election ==
=== Candidates ===
- Democratic: Fred Cowan, State Representative from the 32nd district.
- Republican: Christopher S. Combs, former Estill County attorney. (1982–1986) (Note: As Combs was unopposed in the Republican primary, there are no records available posted about the primary results, hence why there is no GOP primary section.)

=== Results ===
1987 Kentucky Attorney General election
Party	Candidate	Votes	%
Democratic	Fred Cowan	457,008	69.94%
Republican	Christopher S. Combs	196,292	30.04%
Write-in		130	0.02%
Total votes		653,430	100.00%
Democratic hold			
