= 1991 Kentucky lieutenant gubernatorial election =

- November 5, 1991
- Turnout: 46.1%
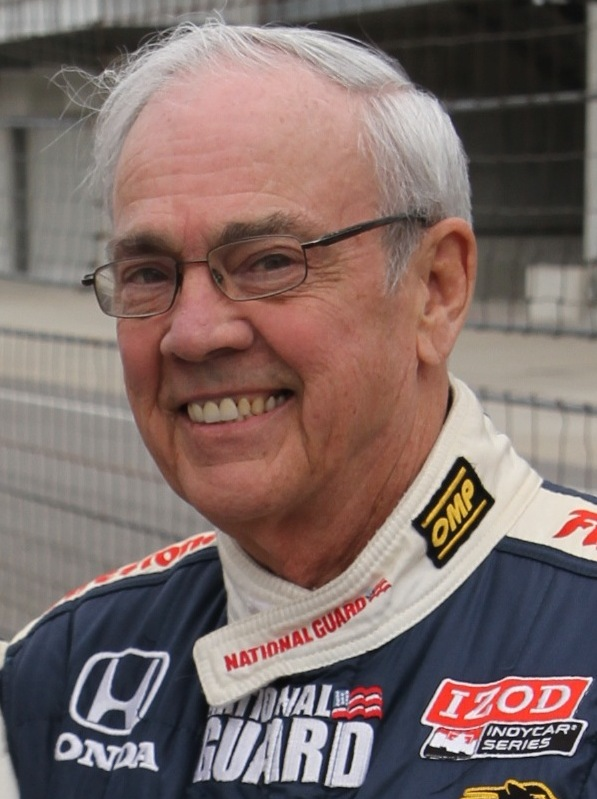

Nominee	Paul E. Patton	Eugene Goss
Party	Democratic	Republican
Popular vote	514,023	250,857
Percentage	67.20%	32.80%
- County results Patton: 50–60% 60–70% 70–80% 80–90% >90% Goss: 50–60% 60–70%
Lieutenant Governor before election
Brereton C. Jones
Democratic
Elected Lieutenant Governor
Paul E. Patton
Democratic

The 1991 Kentucky lieutenant gubernatorial election took place on November 5, 1991, to elect the lieutenant governor of Kentucky. Incumbent Democratic Lieutenant Governor Brereton Jones chose not to seek re-election to a second term in office, instead running for governor.

Pike County executive Paul E. Patton won the general election against attorney Eugene Goss, by a margin of 514,023 to 250,857 votes.

This would be the last time the Lieutenant Governor and Governor were elected separately. In 1992, three Constitutional Amendments were placed on the ballot. One of these amendments was to end the governor and lieutenant governor from running separately in an election, which passed, 51.1% to 48.9%.

== Democratic primary ==
Throughout the primary, attorney general Fred Cowan had generally been seen as the front-runner for the Democratic nomination for lieutenant governor. However, on May 15, 1991, it was revealed that Cowan had sent a campaign contribution letter to Eric P. Shaffer, a registered architect who was under investigation for political contributions by Cowan's office, just days before he was scheduled to appear in Court. In the letter, Cowan asked for a campaign contribution request of $2,000 from Shaffer. Shaffer was subpoenaed April 3, and was scheduled to arrive in court on April 9. The date of the letter was April 7. This made it look like Shaffer was being pressured to give a campaign contribution to Cowan in return for clemency.

Cowan had stated that he was not aware that Shaffer was under subpoena, and that his campaign letter was one of many sent out in early April. Nonetheless, this severely hurt his image. On election day, Cowan lost to Pike County executive Paul E. Patton by a margin of 41,765 votes.

=== Candidates ===
==== Nominee ====
- Paul E. Patton, Pike County Judge-Executive and candidate for this seat in 1987.

==== Eliminated in primary ====
- Fred Cowan, incumbent Attorney General of Kentucky.
- Steve Collins, son of former governor Martha Layne Collins.
- Bobby H. Richardson, former Speaker of the Kentucky House of Representatives (1982–1985).
- Pete Worthington, Member of the Kentucky House of Representatives from the 70th district.
- Judge Ray Corns, circuit judge (1983–1990).
- John Frith Stewart, former mayor of Pewee Valley.

=== Results ===
May 28, Democratic primary
Party	Candidate	Votes	%
Democratic	Paul E. Patton	146,102	31.81%
Democratic	Fred Cowan	104,337	22.72%
Democratic	Steve Collins	68,727	14.96%
Democratic	Bobby H. Richardson	65,080	14.17%
Democratic	Pete Worthington	33,794	7.36%
Democratic	Judge Ray Corns	22,578	4.92%
Democratic	John Frith Stewart	18,688	4.06%
Total votes		459,306	100.00%

== Republican primary ==
=== Candidates ===
==== Nominee ====
- Charles Eugene Goss, Harlan County attorney and former secretary of transportation and health and human services.

==== Eliminated in primary ====
- Lawson Walker, Member of the Kentucky House of Representatives from the 66th district.
- Tommy Klein, perennial candidate.

=== Results ===
Republican primary
Party	Candidate	Votes	%
Republican	Charles Eugene Goss	56,181	42.67%
Republican	Henry Lawson Walker	52,392	39.80%
Republican	Tommy Klein	23,077	17.53%
Total votes		131,650	100.00%

== General election ==
=== Results ===
1991 Kentucky lieutenant gubernatorial election
Party	Candidate	Votes	%
Democratic	Paul E. Patton	514,023	67.20%
Republican	Charles Eugene Goss	250,857	32.80%
Total votes		764,880	100.00%
Democratic hold			
