= 1998 Louisville mayoral election =

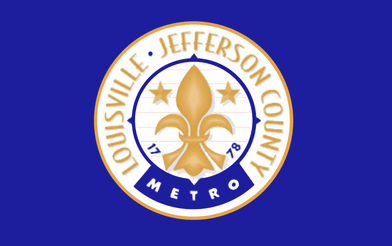
- November 3, 1998
Nominee	Dave Armstrong	Bill Wilson
Party	Democratic	Republican
Popular vote	54,164	15,718
Percentage	75.47%	21.90%
Mayor before election
Jerry Abramson
Democratic
Elected Mayor
Dave Armstrong
Democratic

The 1998 Louisville mayoral election was held on November 3, 1998. The Republican and Democratic primary elections were held on May 26.

Incumbent Democratic mayor Jerry Abramson, who was elected to a third term in 1993, was term-limited and ineligible to seek reelection. He was succeeded by Dave Armstrong, the incumbent Jefferson County Judge/Executive and former Kentucky Attorney General. This was the final mayoral election before the 2002 merged metro government of Louisville and Jefferson County.

== Democratic primary ==
=== Candidates ===
==== Nominee ====
- Dave Armstrong, Jefferson County Judge/Executive (1990–1999) and Kentucky Attorney General (1983–1988)

==== Eliminated in primary ====
- Tom Owen, member of the Louisville Board of Aldermen (1990–1999)

=== Results ===
Democratic primary results
Party	Candidate	Votes	%
Democratic	Dave Armstrong	18,521	52.12
Democratic	Tom Owen	17,017	47.88
Total votes		35,538	100.0

== Republican primary ==
=== Candidates ===
==== Nominee ====
- Bill Wilson, Democratic party member of the Louisville Board of Aldermen (1982–1997)

==== Eliminated in primary ====
- Robert Francis Eberenz, taxicab driver

=== Results ===
Republican primary results
Party	Candidate	Votes	%
Republican	Bill Wilson	3,683	66.17
Republican	Robert Francis Eberenz	1,883	33.83
Total votes		5,566	100.0

== Independent and third-party candidates ==
=== Independent candidates ===
- Bennie J. Smith, office administrator

=== Reform party ===
- K. Scott Ritcher, graphic designer

== General election ==
=== Results ===
1998 Louisville mayoral election
Party	Candidate	Votes	%
Democratic	Dave Armstrong	54,164	75.47
Republican	Bill Wilson	15,718	21.90
Reform	K. Scott Ritcher	1,157	1.61
Independent	Bennie J. Smith	726	1.01
Total votes		71,765	100.0
Democratic hold			
