= Highview Baptist Church (Louisville, Kentucky) =

Multi-site megachurch based in Louisville, Kentucky

Coordinates: 38°08′26.1″N 85°37′02.1″W

Highview Baptist Church is a Baptist multi-site megachurch based in Louisville, Kentucky. It is affiliated with the Kentucky Baptist Convention and Southern Baptist Convention. Aaron Harvie is currently the church's senior pastor.

== History ==
Founded as a baptist mission in 1947 and officially incorporated in 1953, the church has multiple campuses located throughout metro Louisville. As of 2025, the campuses include Fegenbush Campus (the main location) on Fegenbush Lane, which also is home of the Hispanic Campus (Highview en Español), East Campus on Shelbyville Road led by Blake Hodges, Southside Campus in the former Southside Baptist Church building in the Wyandotte neighborhood led by Scott Long, and Beechwood Campus in the former Beechwood Baptist Church building in the Beechwood Village neighborhood of St. Matthews led by Aaron Robb. Scott Long is a former University of Louisville wide receiver who also played briefly for the San Francisco 49ers. The former Valley Station Campus in the southwestern part of Jefferson County was launched as GracePointe Baptist Church in 2020. Other former campuses include the Spencer County Campus, which merged with an existing church to form Redemption Hill Baptist Church.

The church sponsors Whitefield Academy, founded in 1976 as Highview Baptist Christian School.

Bill Hancock served as Highview's senior pastor from 1970 until April 1995, when he resigned in disgrace over an extramarital affair. Dr. Kevin Ezell was then the senior pastor beginning in 1996 until he accepted the presidency of the North American Mission Board in the fall of 2010. Dr. Les Hughes was offered and accepted the position of senior pastor in the spring of 2012. He held the position until his resignation effective June 1, 2015.

On June 26, 2016, Aaron Harvie was called as senior pastor. Harvie has a unique relationship with Highview: in 1999 he planted a church in the suburbs of Philadelphia with Highview as a main sending partner. In addition to financial support, Highview sent missions teams to Philadelphia help the church plant launch and reach the community with the gospel. His family returned to Highview in June 2015, and he served as Interim East Campus Pastor starting in October 2015, heeding a call from interim senior pastor Randy Overstreet.

The church was the focus of national attention in April 2005 when it hosted Justice Sunday, a rally where politically active conservative Evangelical Christians gathered to protest efforts by the United States Senate to filibuster conservative-leaning candidates for judgeships in the federal courts. The event attracted leading members of the conservative Christian movement, including James Dobson and R. Albert Mohler, Jr. The event was widely covered by the news media, and also was protested by critics of the movement. It was the first of three such events to date, with the others held in Nashville, Tennessee and Philadelphia, Pennsylvania.

== Notable church members ==
- Albert Mohler, President of Southern Baptist Theological Seminary, attended Highview's East Campus for many years.
- Russell Moore, President of the Ethics & Religious Liberty Commission of the Southern Baptist Convention, was a teaching pastor at Fegenbush Campus during his time as Vice President at The Southern Baptist Theological Seminary.
- Danny Akin, President of Southeastern Baptist Theological Seminary
- Former Jefferson County Judge/Executive Rebecca Jackson previously served as a community liaison and director of senior citizens programs for the church.

== See also ==
- Whitefield Academy (Kentucky)
