= George Rekers =

American psychologist and evangelist

- Born: George Alan Rekers; July 11, 1948 (age 78); United States
- Education: Westmont College (BA); University of California, Los Angeles (MA, PhD); Columbia International University; University of South Africa
- Occupations: Psychologist; Southern Baptist minister
- Known for: Conversion therapy
- Title: Professor; Reverend

George Alan Rekers (born July 11, 1948) is an American psychologist and ordained Southern Baptist minister. He is emeritus professor of Neuropsychiatry and Behavioral Science at the University of South Carolina School of Medicine. Rekers has a PhD from University of California, Los Angeles and has been a research fellow at Harvard University, a professor and psychologist for UCLA and the University of Florida, and department head at Kansas State University.

In 1983 Rekers was on the founding board of the Family Research Council, a non-profit Christian lobbying organization, and he is a former officer and scientific advisor of the National Association for Research & Therapy of Homosexuality (NARTH), an organization offering conversion therapy, a pseudoscientific practice intended to convert homosexuals to heterosexuality. Rekers has testified in court that homosexuality is destructive, and against parenthood by gay and lesbian people in a number of court cases involving organizations and state agencies working with children.

In May 2010, Rekers employed a male prostitute as a travel companion for a two-week vacation in Europe. Rekers denied any inappropriate conduct and suggestions that he was gay. The male escort told CNN he had given Rekers "sexual massages" while traveling together in Europe. Rekers subsequently resigned from the board of NARTH.

== Personal life, education and academic career ==
Rekers is married with children.

Rekers received his B.A. in psychology from Westmont College in 1969. He later received his M.A. and PhD in psychology from University of California, Los Angeles (UCLA) in 1971 and 1972, respectively. As part of his doctoral studies at UCLA, Rekers led an experimental study which used behavioral treatment to discourage "deviant sex-role behaviors in a male child". In 2011, Anderson Cooper 360° featured a story about the fate of Kirk Murphy, a child Rekers states that he cured in many of his books. Murphy's siblings and mother state that the therapy ultimately had lasting damage to the boy and led to him growing up to be a man who grappled constantly with his homosexuality before committing suicide in 2003 at the age of 38.

== Scholarly work ==
His work has been criticized by other scholars for reinforcing sex-role stereotypes and for reliance on dubious rationales for therapeutic intervention (e.g. parents' worries that their children might become homosexuals).

Rekers refers in his academic work to "the positive therapeutic effects of religious conversion for curing transsexualism" and "the positive therapeutic effect of a church ministry to repentant homosexuals." Judith Butler describes this work as "intensely polemical", giving "highly conservative political reasons for strengthening the diagnosis [of "gender identity disorder"] so that the structures that support normalcy can be strengthened."

=== Growing Up Straight (1982) ===
Growing Up Straight: What Every Family Should Know About Homosexuality is a 1982 guide for parents on how to prevent their children from becoming homosexual. The book was influential. However, the viewpoints espoused in the book have been controversial. Professor Michael R. Schiavi wrote in a 2001 Modern Language Studies journal article that the work was a "horror show written for parents anxious to re-direct sissy sons to sexual righteousness". The columnist Frank Rich questioned the book's status as scholarship in The New York Times, writing that "many of the footnotes cite his own previous writings." The psychologist and sexologist Kenneth Zucker reviewed Growing Up Straight and Shaping Your Child's Sexual Identity, another work by Rekers, in a 1984 issue of Archives of Sexual Behavior. He described both works as, "examples of the passionate response that can be engendered by the study of human sexuality. In this instance, religious rhetoric is used to defend the author's views on the subject. What is perhaps most disappointing about these two books is the idyllic view of family life and human conduct for which the author longs." Zucker went on to write, "Ultimately, one has to wonder how Rekers will feel toward his child patients, should they grow up not to be straight. He might well benefit by recalling the words of Harry Stack Sullivan: "We are all much more simply human than otherwise."

=== Shaping Your Child's Sexual Identity (1982) ===
In Shaping Your Child's Sexual Identity, Rekers provides advice to parents which he claims can help them prevent their children from becoming homosexual. The book received a negative review from the psychologist Kenneth Zucker in Archives of Sexual Behavior. Zucker wrote that, as in some of his other work, such as Growing Up Straight (1982), Rekers ignored, dismissed, or distorted scientific data to prevent it from conflicting with his religious views. He noted that some of the material was controversial, such as Rekers's discussion of his behavior as an expert witness in a child custody case, in which he testified against a lesbian mother seeking to regain custody of her daughters because her lesbianism "placed her children at risk for deviant sex-role development". Zucker criticized Rekers for ignoring scholarly literature suggesting that there is little evidence for such claims. He concluded that Shaping Your Child's Sexual Identity is an example of "the passionate rhetoric that can be engendered by the study of human sexuality."

The neuroscientist Simon LeVay commented that Shaping Your Child's Sexual Identity reveals his "virulent antipathy towards homosexuality." Jackie M. Blount found Rekers's "language and logic reminiscent of works from earlier decades", comparing Shaping Your Child's Sexual Identity to Peter and Barbara Wyden's Growing Up Straight (1968). She wrote that the book was influential. Ellen K. Feder criticized Rekers's work for lacking scientific credibility, describing Rekers's Growing Up Straight and Shaping Your Child's Sexual Identity as "manuals for parents designed to assist them in deterring their children from pursuing a 'deviant' lifestyle." The journalist Robyn E. Blumner of the Tampa Bay Times criticized Shaping Your Child's Sexual Identity for Rekers's "gay-bashing" rhetoric, such as his claim that gay activists secretly want to legalize pedophilia.

== Views on the family ==
Rekers' views on family life were the focus of a major controversy in Florida in 2002 when then-governor Jeb Bush appointed Jerry Regier to the post of head of the Florida Department of Children and Families with responsibility for child welfare. Shortly after the announcement of Regier's appointment, it was disclosed that in 1989 the California-based Coalition on Revival had published a fundamentalist tract titled The Christian World View of the Family under the names of Regier and Rekers, which condemned working mothers as being in "bondage" and argued that the government should have no right to place children in protective custody except in cases of extreme abuse or neglect. The tract's authors also "affirm that Biblical spanking may cause temporary and superficial bruises or welts that do not constitute child abuse" and "deny that the Bible countenances any other definition of the family, such as the sharing of a household by homosexual partners, and that society's laws should be modified in any way to broaden the definition of family." The tract was condemned by Democrats; Bush told the media that Regier "doesn't share those extreme views." Regier survived the controversy and served as DCF head from 2002 to the end of Jeb Bush's term in 2007.

Rekers is a practicing Southern Baptist, and credits the work of C.S. Lewis, particularly his writings on gender relations, with influencing his religious and social views.

== Views on homosexuality ==
Rekers has attracted attention for his views on homosexuality, which have been promoted in a number of forums and court cases. He asserts that homosexuality is a "gender disturbance" that can be corrected through 18 to 22 months of weekly therapy during childhood and adolescence. Mark Pietrzyk, of the gay group the Log Cabin Republicans, has stated that Rekers' method uses aversion therapy – a practice opposed by the American Psychiatric Association (APA) – that punishes "nonconforming" behavior such as swaggering in girls or limp wrists in boys and rewards "conforming" behavior such as girls playing with dolls and boys playing basketball.

A number of authorities working in the relevant fields reject Reker's basic premise utterly; a publication from the APA states "The idea that homosexuality is a mental disorder or that the emergence of same-sex attraction and orientation among some adolescents is in any way abnormal or mentally unhealthy has no support among any mainstream health and mental health professional organizations." (Printing and distribution of that publication was with the support of the American Counseling Association, the Interfaith Alliance, and the National Education Association.) According to Rekers himself, he spends much of his time with boys whose peers regard them as "sissy" and "effeminate" with the goal of reversing those traits and "help[ing] these children to become better adapted to themselves and to their environment." The APA's opposition to his methods led to him resigning from the organization.

Rekers has appeared in court in several cases as an expert witness testifying on matters concerning homosexuality. His testimony has been strongly criticized by a number of parties including trial judges; the American Civil Liberties Union has asserted that his personal beliefs regarding homosexuality interfere with his ability to give an unbiased professional opinion on lesbian, gay, bisexual and transsexual (LGBT) topics, including gay adoption. Legal experts have discussed whether his involvement with a male prostitute in 2010 could render his testimony unreliable, possibly affecting the outcome of pending cases in Florida and California.

=== Boy Scouts of America hearing, 1998 ===
Rekers testified before the Washington, D.C. Human Rights Commission on behalf of the Boy Scouts of America in 1998 in defense of the group's policy on excluding homosexuals, arguing that it was justified because admission of homosexuals "would legitimize the value of homosexual behavior in the eyes of many of the Boy Scouts ... There would be more homosexual conduct or behavior by the boys in such troops." He has acknowledged that his views are heavily influenced by religious concerns; as a member of the Southern Baptists, he believes that the city of Sodom was destroyed by God as a punishment for allowing homosexuality and that active homosexuals face "eternal separation from God", i.e., perpetuity in hell.

=== Arkansas gay adoption case, 2004 ===
Rekers was an expert witness in a 2004 case involving gay adoption in Arkansas, which had banned LGBT people from adopting in 1999. He argued that "it would be in the best interest of foster children to be placed in a heterosexual home" because the majority of people in the country disapproved of homosexual behaviour, putting further stress on children who were already likely to suffer from psychological disorders. According to Rekers, "That disapproval filters down to children [who] will express disapproval in more cruel, insensitive ways" toward a child being parented by a gay person. In cross-examination, Rekers acknowledged that he believed that homosexuality is sinful and that the Bible is the infallible word of God. His testimony was rebutted by Dr. Michael Lamb, a psychiatrist, who stated that there was no scientific evidence for the assertion that homosexuals were worse parents than heterosexuals.

The trial judge, Pulaski County Circuit Court judge Timothy Fox, ruled against the state of Arkansas in December 2004. He was strongly critical of Rekers' testimony, describing it as "extremely suspect" and said that Rekers "was there primarily to promote his own personal ideology." Rekers responded by denouncing the trial as "utterly corrupt."

Following the case, Rekers billed the Arkansas Department of Health and Human Services a sum of $165,000 for his testimony, an amount that far exceeded what the state had anticipated. He later increased the bill to $200,000 with the addition of late fees and other charges for preparing paperwork. The unpaid bill led to two years of legal wrangling that was finally settled out of court with a $60,000 payment.

=== Florida gay adoption case, 2008 ===
In 2008, Rekers was an expert witness in In re: Gill, a case defending Florida's gay adoption ban. He presented testimony asserting that homosexuals are more likely to suffer from depression, substance abuse, and emotional problems. Citing what he called "God's moral laws," he asserted that individual homosexuals are "manipulated by leaders of the homosexual revolt" to the detriment of those suffering this "sexual perversion." He also asserted that Native Americans would make unsuitable foster parents, asserting that they suffered from a high risk of alcohol abuse and psychiatric disorders.

Miami-Dade Circuit Court Judge Cindy Lederman ruled against the state. In her decision, she said "Dr. Rekers' testimony was far from a neutral and unbiased recitation of the relevant scientific evidence. Dr. Rekers' beliefs are motivated by his strong ideological and theological convictions that are not consistent with the science. Based on his testimony and demeanor at trial, the court cannot consider his testimony to be credible nor worthy of forming the basis of public policy." It later emerged that Rekers had been paid nearly $120,000 for his testimony on behalf of the state, which had been solicited specifically by Florida Attorney General Bill McCollum. The attorney general wrote in 2007: "Our attorneys handling this case have searched long and hard for other expert witnesses with comparable expertise to Dr. Rekers and have been unable to identify any who would be available for this case." However, his choice of witness was criticized by Nadine Smith of the gay-rights organization Equality Florida: "Rekers is part of a small cadre of bogus pseudo scientists that charge these exorbitant fees to peddle information they know has been discredited time and time again. And people like McCollum will pay top dollar for it. There's a reason why he can't find credible sources. Because credible people don't believe this ban should exist."

Third District Court of Appeal State of Florida, stated in the decision: "Dr. Cochran (Professor of Epidemiology and Statistics at the University of California in Los Angeles) also testified about errors in scientific methodology and reporting in Dr. Rekers' study, stating that Dr. Rekers had failed to present an objective review of the evidence on those subjects. Cochran concluded that Dr. Rekers' work did not meet established standards in the field. Another expert, Dr. Peplau (Professor of Psychology at the University of California in Los Angeles), testified that Dr. Rekers had omitted in his review of the scientific literature “other published, widely cited studies on the stability of actual relationships over time.”

== Organizational affiliations ==
=== Family Research Council ===
In 1983 Rekers was on the founding board of the Family Research Council, a non-profit Christian lobbying organization, along with James Dobson and Armand Nicholi Jr.

=== NARTH ===
Until May 11, 2010, Rekers was listed as an advisor and officer with the National Association for Research & Therapy of Homosexuality but resigned following the exposure of the rent-boy scandal. NARTH is an association which promotes the acceptance of conversion therapy intended to change homosexuals into heterosexuals, contrary to the advice of mainstream professional associations such as the American Psychiatric Association and American Psychological Association.

== "Rent boy" allegations ==
The Miami New Times reported on May 4, 2010, that three weeks previously, Rekers had been photographed at Miami International Airport with a twenty-year-old "rent boy" who was using the pseudonym "Lucien" (later identified as Jo-Vanni Roman). Roman was available for hire through the Rentboy.com website. Rekers acknowledged hiring Roman for the 10-day European vacation as a "travel assistant" and denies any impropriety. He said that Roman was there to help carry his luggage since he had surgery recently and was unable to carry it himself, although the photograph clearly showed Rekers lifting his own luggage. Rekers was quoted as commenting, "If you talk with my travel assistant ... you will find I spent a great deal of time sharing scientific information on the desirability of abandoning homosexual intercourse, and I shared the Gospel of Jesus Christ with him in great detail." The incident was covered by media outlets and TV shows worldwide.

In subsequent interviews, Roman said Rekers had paid him to provide nude massages daily: "'Jo-vanni' in news reports, has told various media outlets that he gave Rekers daily massages in the nude during the trip, which included genital touching." He also talked about how he believed that Rekers was, in fact, homosexual: "It's a situation," Roman said, "where he's going against homosexuality when he is a homosexual." According to the New Times, Roman "made it clear they met through Rentboy.com", and denied that he had been hired to carry luggage; The Times reported that Rekers "hired a companion from a website called Rentboy.com that offers clients a wide range of choices, from 'rentboy' and 'sugar daddy' to 'masseur'." On the May 6, 2010 episode of The Daily Show, Jon Stewart pointed out that Roman is looking on in the photograph, while Rekers is seen handling his own luggage.

Following the first report about Rekers, on May 8, 2010, New York magazine reported that another individual said that Rekers had hired him in a similar capacity in 1992.

On May 12, Christianity Today reported that Rekers stated on his personal website that he had interviewed several people for the role of travel assistant, and was not aware of his assistant's internet advertisements. He e-mailed them saying "I confessed to the Lord and to my family that I was unwise and wrong to hire this travel assistant after knowing him only one month before the trip", saying he was unaware that his "travel assistant" was "more than a person raised in a Christian home". Rekers explained his regrets for the harm caused by his "unwise decision", and that he was being advised by "an experienced pastor and counselor from my church, so I can more fully understand my weaknesses and prevent this kind of unwise decision-making in the future". On his resignation from NARTH he said "I am not gay and never have been." The scandal became popular fodder for media commentators and comics. Frank Rich of the New York Times wrote: "Thanks to Rekers's clownish public exposure, we now know that his professional judgments are windows into his cracked psyche, not gay people's. But...his excursions into public policy have had real and damaging consequences on a large swath of Americans."

Newsweek's June 7, 2010 issue's Back Story listed Rekers, among others, as a prominent conservative activist who has a record of supporting anti-gay legislation and was later caught in a gay sex scandal.

== Experiments on gender-variant children ==
Rekers co-authored four papers with Ole Ivar Lovaas, a psychology professor at UCLA, on children with atypical gender behaviors. The subject of the first of these studies, a 'feminine' young boy who was homosexual by four-and-a-half years old at the inception of treatment, committed suicide as an adult; his family attribute the suicide to this treatment.

Following his suicide in 2010, the man's sister told the news that she read his journal which described how he feared disclosing his sexual orientation because when receiving the behavior modification treatment as a young boy, his father would beat him severely if he was given a different color "poker chip" as punishment for feminine-like behavior such as playing with dolls.

== Publications ==
- Growing Up Straight: What Every Family Should Know About Homosexuality (1982) ISBN 978-0-8024-0156-4
- Shaping Your Child's Sexual Identity (1982). ISBN 0-8010-7713-3
- Making up the difference: help for single parents with teenagers (1984). ISBN 978-0-8010-7726-5
- Family building: six qualities of a strong family (1985). ISBN 978-0-8307-1046-1
- Counseling Families (1988). ISBN 978-0-8499-0595-7
- The Christian World View of the Family (1989)
- Susan Smith: victim or murderer? (1996). ISBN 978-0-944435-38-0
