= Southern High School (Kentucky) =

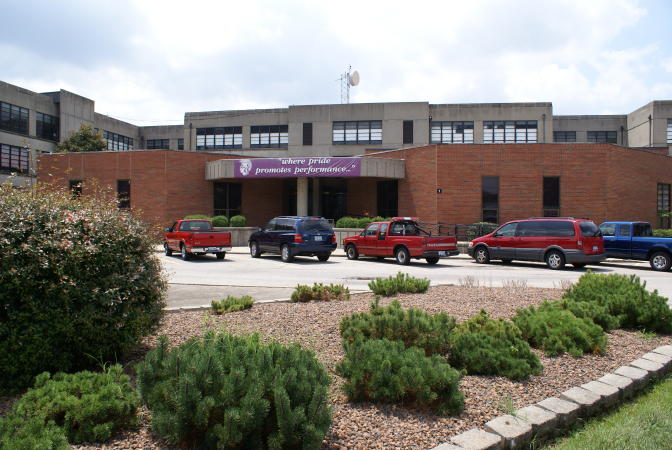

Location
- 8620 Preston Highway; Louisville, Kentucky 40219; United States; 38.12664°N 85.68121°W

Information
- Type: Public secondary
- Motto: ... where pride promotes performance ...
- Established: 1951; first graduating class: 1952
- Principal: Tyler Shearon
- Staff: 90.20 (FTE)
- Grades: 9–12
- Enrollment: 1,540 (2023–2024)
- Student to teacher ratio: 17.07
- Color
- Mascot: Trojan
- Website: Official Website

Southern High School Magnet Career Academy (MCA) was built in 1951, and the first graduating class was in 1952. All students had transferred from the recently closed Okolona High School, which became Okolona Elementary School.

Unlike in many high schools, students eventually choose a "major," including business technology, telecommunications, machine tool and die technology, and transportation technology.

Starting in the 2011–12 school year, the "Freshman Academy", which is devoted to help freshmen adjust to high school, was opened. Freshmen do not have their own lunch. However, they have taken a part of the 3rd and 2nd floor to be used as the Freshman Academy area.

Starting in the 2011–2012 school year, with the new principal came a change known as "Southern 3.0 Upgrade", in which the school has become more involved and more rigorous with learning.

== Notable alumni ==
- Lisa Harrison (1989) – athlete; former WNBA player; 1989 Naismith Prep Player of the Year
- Hoot Hester (1969) – musician; fiddler for the Grand Ole Opry
- William R. Higgins – Marine colonel; served in the Vietnam War, and was captured and later murdered while serving on a United Nations peacekeeping mission in Lebanon
- Rebecca Jackson – politician; former Jefferson County Judge/Executive
- Phil Simms (1974) – sportscaster; former NFL quarterback; two-time Super Bowl champion
- Terrence W. Wilcutt (1967) – astronaut; space shuttle pilot and mission commander
- Deon Yelder (2013) athlete, NFL Tight-End; Kansas City Chiefs

== See also ==
- Public schools in Louisville, Kentucky
