= John B. Breckinridge =

American politician

John Bayne Breckinridge
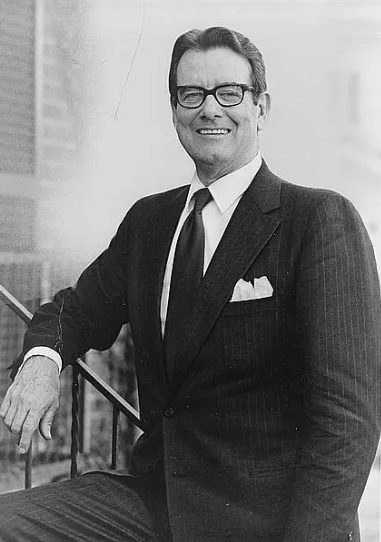

Member of the U.S. House of Representatives from Kentucky's 6th district
- In office January 3, 1973 – January 3, 1979
- Preceded by: William P. Curlin Jr.
- Succeeded by: Larry Hopkins

38th & 40th Attorney General of Kentucky
- In office January 1, 1968 – January 3, 1972
- Governor: Louie Nunn; Wendell Ford
- Preceded by: Robert F. Matthews Jr.
- Succeeded by: Ed W. Hancock
- In office January 4, 1960 – January 6, 1964
- Governor: Bert Combs; Ned Breathitt
- Preceded by: Jo M. Ferguson
- Succeeded by: Robert F. Matthews Jr.

Member of the Kentucky House of Representatives from the 49th district
- In office January 1, 1956 – January 1, 1960
- Preceded by: John Y. Brown Sr.
- Succeeded by: Ted R. Osborne

Personal details
- Born: November 29, 1913 Washington, D.C., U.S.
- Died: July 29, 1979 (aged 65) Lexington, Kentucky, U.S.
- Resting place: Lexington Cemetery
- Party: Democratic
- Spouse: Helen Congleton
- Relations: See Breckinridge family
- Children: 2
- Parent(s): Scott Dudley Breckinridge Sr. Gertrude Ashby Bayne

John Bayne Breckinridge (November 29, 1913 – July 29, 1979) was an American politician, a Democrat who served as Attorney General of Kentucky twice and also served as a member of the United States House of Representatives from Kentucky.

== Early life ==
Breckinridge was born in the District of Columbia on November 29, 1913. His father was Dr. Scott Dudley Breckinridge Sr. and his mother was Gertrude Ashby (née Bayne) Breckinridge. His father was a fencer who competed in the 1912 Summer Olympics, and was a gynecologist in Lexington.

The Breckinridge family has been one of Kentucky's most prominent. John B.'s grandfather was Joseph Cabell Breckinridge Sr. and his great-uncle was John C. Breckinridge, who was vice president under James Buchanan, the Southern Democratic nominee for president in 1860 and a major general in the Confederate Army. Among John B.'s uncles were Joseph Cabell Breckinridge Jr., an officer in the United States Navy during the Spanish–American War, and Henry Skillman Breckinridge, who served as the United States Assistant Secretary of War under President Woodrow Wilson. He was the great-great-grandson of John Breckinridge, who had served as the second Attorney General of Kentucky and in the Kentucky House of Representatives and who also served as a member of the United States Senate and as Attorney General of the United States. John B. Breckinridge was also the great-nephew of William Campbell Preston Breckinridge who also represented Kentucky in the United States House of Representatives.

He received his bachelor's and law degrees from the University of Kentucky. He was admitted to the Kentucky Bar in 1940 and practiced law in Lexington, Kentucky. He worked in the Anti-Trust Division of the United States Department of Justice in 1940–1941. He served in the United States Army from April 18, 1941, to October 30, 1946, during World War II, rising to the rank of lieutenant colonel.

== Political career ==
Breckinridge was twice elected to the Kentucky House of Representatives from the 49th district and served from 1956 to 1959.

Breckinridge was elected Attorney General of Kentucky in 1959 when Bert T. Combs led the Democratic ticket to victory. He served his first term from 1960 to 1963, also serving on the National Conference of Commissioners on Uniform State Law and as a delegate to the Democratic National Convention in 1960. Under state law at that time Breckinridge could not run for a second consecutive term as attorney general. He ran in 1963 for Lieutenant Governor of Kentucky but lost in the Democratic primary to Harry Lee Waterfield. After that defeat Breckinridge returned to his law practice and planned a return to public office.

Breckinridge was elected to a second, non-consecutive term as Attorney General of Kentucky in 1967. He was one of three statewide Democratic candidates elected while the Republican ticket, led by Louie B. Nunn, won the governorship. Breckinridge served his second term as Attorney General of Kentucky from 1968 to 1971. He ran for lieutenant governor in 1971 but again lost in the Democratic primary, this time to Speaker of the Kentucky House of Representatives Julian Carroll, who was running on an informal slate with former Gov. Bert Combs, who lost to Lt. Gov. Wendell Ford.

In 1972 Breckinridge was elected to an open seat in the United States House of Representatives from Kentucky's Sixth Congressional District (Lexington and the central Bluegrass). He defeated Republican Laban P. Jackson. He was re-elected in 1974 and 1976 but was defeated in the 1978 Democratic primary by state Sen. Tom Easterly of Frankfort, who in turn lost the seat to Republican Larry Hopkins.

After his defeat Breckinridge returned to the practice of law in Lexington, Kentucky, where he died less than a year later on July 29, 1979. His ashes were interred at Lexington Cemetery.

=== Legacy ===
As a member of the Kentucky House of Representatives and the United States House of Representatives, Breckinridge was regarded as an independent moderate.

== Personal life ==
Breckinridge was married to Helen Congleton, with whom he would have two children, Knight Osheroff and John B. Breckinridge, Jr.

== Electoral history ==
Kentucky Attorney General Election, 1959
Party	Candidate	Votes	%
Democratic	John B. Breckinridge	477,288	61.93%
Republican	Samuel S. Cannon	293,375	38.07%
Total votes		770,663	100.00%
Democratic hold			

Kentucky Lieutenant Gubernatorial Democratic primary results, 1963
Party	Candidate	Votes	%
Democratic	Harry Lee Waterfield	247,464	55.90%
Democratic	John B. Breckinridge	195,238	44.10%
Total votes		442,702	100.00%

Kentucky Attorney General Democratic primary results, 1967
Party	Candidate	Votes	%
Democratic	John B. Breckinridge	134,280	68.16%
Democratic	M. R. "Mike" Mills	62,709	31.84%
Total votes		196,989	100.00%

Kentucky Attorney General Election, 1967
Party	Candidate	Votes	%
Democratic	John B. Breckinridge	403,204	50.79%
Republican	Lester H. Burns, Jr.	385,325	48.53%
Conservative	Clarence L. Bell	5,347	0.68%
Total votes		793,876	100.00%
Democratic hold			

Kentucky Lieutenant Gubernatorial Democratic primary results, 1971
Party	Candidate	Votes	%
Democratic	Julian M. Carroll	152,336	44.64%
Democratic	John B. Breckinridge	130,673	38.30%
Democratic	Henry Beach	43,593	12.78%
Democratic	James W. Rogers	14,601	4.28%
Total votes		341,203	100.00%

Kentucky's 6th congressional district, Democratic primary results, 1972
Party	Candidate	Votes	%
Democratic	John B. Breckinridge	18,537	57.39%
Democratic	Tom Ward	10,330	31.98%
Democratic	Philip E. (Phil) King	3,433	10.63%
Total votes		32,300	100.00%

Kentucky's 6th congressional district general election, 1972
Party	Candidate	Votes	%
Democratic	John B. Breckinridge	76,185	52.40%
Republican	Laban P. Jackson	68,012	46.77%
People's	Thomas F. Lundeen	1,215	0.83%
Total votes		145,412	100.00%
Democratic hold			

Kentucky's 6th congressional district, Democratic primary results, 1974
Party	Candidate	Votes	%
Democratic	John B. Breckinridge (incumbent)	21,202	84.05%
Democratic	Robert K. Landrum	4,023	15.95%
Total votes		25,225	100.00%

Kentucky's 6th congressional district general election, 1974
Party	Candidate	Votes	%
Democratic	John B. Breckinridge (incumbent)	63,010	72.08%
Republican	Thomas F. Rogers III	21,039	24.06%
American	Fred Kerestesy	3,367	3.86%
Total votes		87,416	100.00%
Democratic hold			

Kentucky's 6th congressional district, Democratic primary results, 1976
Party	Candidate	Votes	%
Democratic	John B. Breckinridge (incumbent)	36,887	88.18%
Democratic	Victor E. Privette	4,942	11.82%
Total votes		41,829	100.00%

Kentucky's 6th congressional district general election, 1976
Party	Candidate	Votes	%
Democratic	John B. Breckinridge (incumbent)	90,695	93.99%
American	Anthony A. McCord	5,795	6.00%
Write-in		3	0.00%
Total votes		96,493	100.00%
Democratic hold			

Kentucky's 6th congressional district, Democratic primary results, 1978
Party	Candidate	Votes	%
Democratic	Tom Easterly	17,673	50.11%
Democratic	John B. Breckinridge (incumbent)	17,178	48.71%
Democratic	Victor E. Privette	414	1.18%
Total votes		35,265	100.00%

== See also ==
- List of members of the American Legion

Party political offices
Preceded by Jo M. Ferguson	Democratic nominee for Attorney General of Kentucky; 1959	Succeeded by Robert F. Matthews Jr.
Preceded by Robert F. Matthews Jr.	Democratic nominee for Attorney General of Kentucky; 1967	Succeeded by Ed W. Hancock
U.S. House of Representatives
Preceded by William P. Curlin, Jr.	U.S. Representative from Kentucky's 6th congressional district January 3, 1973-January 3, 1979	Succeeded by Larry Hopkins
Legal offices
Preceded by Jo M. Ferguson	Attorney General of Kentucky; 1960–1964	Succeeded by Robert F. Matthews, Jr.
Preceded by Robert F. Matthews, Jr.	Attorney General of Kentucky; 1968–1972	Succeeded by Ed W. Hancock
