= Tina Bojanowski =

American politician (born 1964)

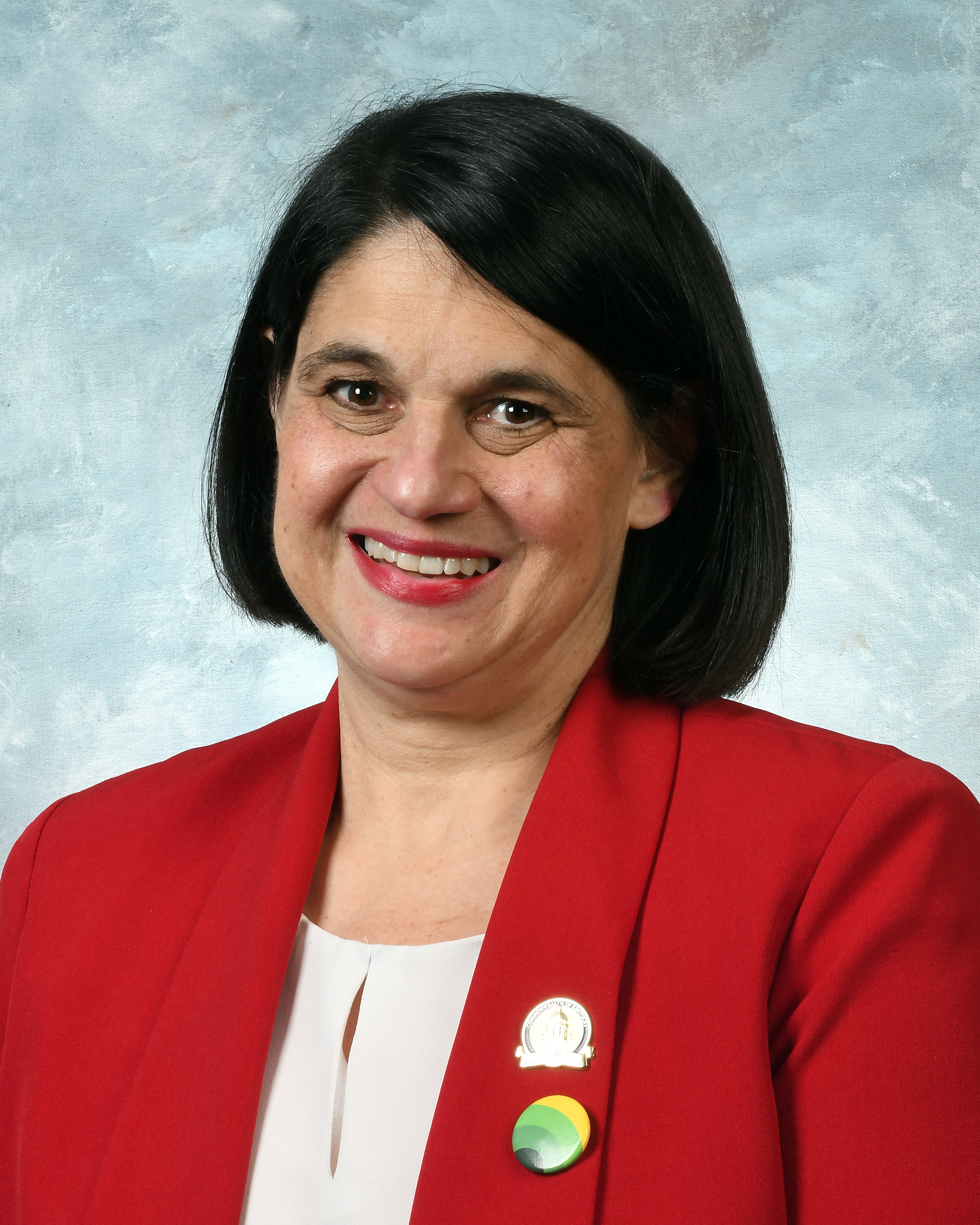

Member of the Kentucky House of Representatives from the 32nd district
- Incumbent
- Assumed office January 1, 2019
- Preceded by: Phil Moffett

Personal details
- Born: August 29, 1964 (age 62)
- Party: Democratic
- Education: University of Louisville; Bellarmine University

Christine Bojanowski (born August 29, 1964) is an American politician. She is a Democrat representing District 32 in the Kentucky House of Representatives.

== Personal life ==
Bojanowski holds a Bachelor of Science and an MBA from the University of Louisville, and a MAT and PhD from Bellarmine University. She is currently a teacher at Watterson Elementary School, a public school in Louisville, Kentucky.

== Political career ==
Bojanowski was elected to represent the 32nd district in the Kentucky House of Representatives in 2018, defeating Republican incumbent Phil Moffett.

=== Committee assignments ===
- Primary & Secondary Ed & Workforce Development
- Education
- State Government
- Veterans, Military Affairs, & Public Protection

=== Legislation ===
Since 2019, Bojanowski has been a primary sponsor of the following bills which have been considered by at least one house:

Bill	Title	House Vote	Senate Vote	Governor	Ky. Acts
21 HB 305	An act establishing the official Kentucky Mental Health Flag	Passed 96–0	Not voted	—N/a	—N/a
22 HB 226	An act relating to early literacy education, making an appropriation therefor, and declaring an emergency	Passed 86–7	Not voted	—N/a	—N/a
24 HB 612	An act relating to reading and language arts instruction	Passed 79–15	Not voted	—N/a	—N/a

== Electoral history ==
=== 2018 ===
2018 Kentucky House of Representatives 32nd district election
Party	Candidate	Votes	%
Democratic	Tina Bojanowski	10,243	53.6
Republican	Phil Moffett (incumbent)	8,877	46.4
Total votes		19,120	100.0
Democratic gain from Republican			

=== 2020 ===
2020 Kentucky House of Representatives 32nd district election
Party	Candidate	Votes	%
Democratic	Tina Bojanowski (incumbent)	13,047	53.7
Republican	G. Hunt Rounsavall Jr.	11,244	46.3
Total votes		24,291	100.0
Democratic hold			

=== 2022 ===
2022 Kentucky House of Representatives 32nd district election
Party	Candidate	Votes	%
Democratic	Tina Bojanowski (incumbent)	Unopposed	
Total votes		13,061	100.0
Democratic hold			

=== 2024 ===
2024 Kentucky House of Representatives 32nd district election
Party	Candidate	Votes	%
Democratic	Tina Bojanowski (incumbent)	Unopposed	
Total votes		16,494	100.0
Democratic hold			
