= Fred Cowan =

American politician

45th Attorney General of Kentucky
- In office January 4, 1988 – January 6, 1992
- Governor: Wallace Wilkinson; Brereton C. Jones
- Preceded by: David L. Armstrong
- Succeeded by: Chris Gorman

Member of the Kentucky House of Representatives from the 32nd district
- In office January 1, 1982 – November 2, 1987
- Preceded by: E. Bruce Blythe
- Succeeded by: Anne Northup

Personal details
- Born: October 11, 1945 (age 80) New York City, U.S.
- Party: Democratic
- Education: Dartmouth College (BA); Harvard University (JD)

Frederic Joseph Cowan Jr. (born October 11, 1945) is a Kentucky politician. He served as a Kentucky Circuit Judge of the 30th judicial circuit in Louisville from 2007 to 2015. He is a former Kentucky Attorney General (1988–1992) and former member of the Kentucky State House of Representatives for the 32nd district (1982–1987). Cowan is one of the few Kentuckians to have been elected to offices in all three branches of Kentucky state government

== Early life and education ==
Cowan was born on October 11, 1945, in New York City to Mary Virginia Wesley of Union County, Kentucky, and Frederic Sr., also of New York City. At age 8 he moved to Sturgis, Kentucky and a year later moved to Louisville where he attended Bloom Elementary, Highland Middle, and Atherton High School. In 1963, Cowan applied to multiple universities and was accepted in to all of them. Eventually it came down between Dartmouth and Harvard. Harvard did not offer him any scholarship money, so he attended Dartmouth, which he graduated from in 1967. He served in the Peace Corps in Dessie, Ethiopia (1967–1969). While in Ethiopia, he taught English at Woizero Siheen High School and became fluent in Amharic.

Once he returned to the US, he taught 5th grade in North Carolina before moving to Little Rock, Arkansas where he was a copy editor at the Arkansas Democrat and then started a grassroots consumer organization. In Little Rock, he met and married Linda Marshall Scholle, granddaughter of Lenore Marshall and great-granddaughter of Louis Marshall. Fred and Linda moved to Massachusetts for Fred to attend Harvard Law School where he graduated in 1978.

== Political career ==
Cowan moved to Louisville and worked for the campaign of Harvey Sloane for Governor of Kentucky in 1978–1979. After the unsuccessful campaign, Cowan practiced law with former Brown, Todd and Heyburn (Frost Brown Todd) and ran for State Representative, defeating a ten-term Republican incumbent. In the 1987 election he ran for Attorney General of Kentucky and defeated Todd Hollenbach in the Democratic primary. As Attorney General he successfully argued Stanford v. Kentucky before the United States Supreme Court in 1989. In 2005, the case was reversed by Roper v. Simmons.

In 1991, Cowan unsuccessfully ran for lieutenant governor. In 1998, Cowan unsuccessfully ran for Judge/Executive of Jefferson County.

Before being elected as a Circuit Court judge in 2006, he practiced law from 1992 to 2006 with Lynch, Cox, Gillman and Mayhan (now Lynch, Cox, Gillman and Goodman).

== Personal life ==
Cowan is the younger brother of author Roberta Bondi, older brother of History Detective and Antiques Roadshow appraiser Wes Cowan and first cousin of actress and singer Kassie Wesley DePaiva. He and Linda have three daughters.

Party political offices
Preceded by David L. Armstrong	Democratic nominee for Attorney General of Kentucky; 1987	Succeeded by Chris Gorman
Legal offices
Preceded by David L. Armstrong	Attorney General of Kentucky; 1988–1992	Succeeded by Chris Gorman
