= Charlie Walton =

American politician

Member of the Kentucky House of Representatives from the 66th district
- In office January 1, 1993 – January 1, 2005
- Preceded by: Lawson Walker
- Succeeded by: Addia Wuchner

Personal details
- Born: Charles Robert Walton; January 25, 1947 Dayton, Kentucky
- Died: August 29, 2025 (aged 78)
- Party: Republican

Charles Robert Walton (January 25, 1947 – August 29, 2025) was an American politician from Kentucky who was a member of the Kentucky House of Representatives from 1993 to 2005 and a member of the Boone County Commission from 2011 to 2018.

Walton was first elected in 1992, succeeding incumbent representative Lawson Walker who retired after unsuccessfully running for lieutenant governor in 1991. He unsuccessfully ran for the Kentucky Senate in 2004, losing to incumbent Dick Roeding, and again in 2008 against former Boone County jailer and U.S. Marshal John Schickel.

Walton died on August 29, 2025, in Florence, Kentucky, at the age of 78.
