= Solicitor General of Kentucky =

Solicitor General of the Commonwealth of Kentucky

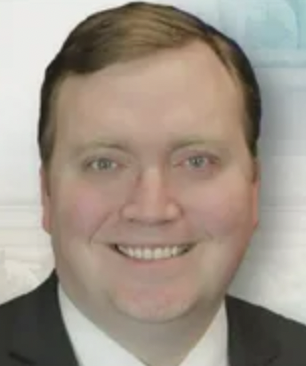
- Incumbent; Matt Kuhn since 2021
- Appointer: Attorney General of Kentucky
- Formation: August 7, 2019
- First holder: Chad Meredith
- Salary: $161,761

The Solicitor General of Kentucky is the top appellate lawyer of the U.S. commonwealth of Kentucky. Appointed by the Kentucky attorney general, the solicitor general is tasked with arguing all criminal and civil appeals where Kentucky is a party as well as any amicus curiae briefs the commonwealth files in the Supreme Court of the United States, United States Court of Appeals for the Sixth Circuit, Kentucky Supreme Court, and Kentucky Court of Appeals.

The current solicitor general is Matt Kuhn, who has served in the position since 2021.

== History ==
On August 7, 2019, a restructuring of the executive branch's general counsel office was announced which, among other changes, created the position of solicitor general to oversee all appellant litigation related to the executive branch. Chief deputy general counsel Chad Meredith was appointed to assume the new role.

On December 11, attorney general-elect Daniel Cameron announced his appointment of Meredith as solicitor general within his office as well as his intent to have the position of solicitor general codified during the next legislative session.

During the 2020 General Assembly, state senator Whitney Westerfield filed Senate Bill 160 to reorganize the office of the attorney general. Included in its provisions was the creation of the office of the solicitor general, the consolidation of the criminal and civil appeals divisions to be under the solicitor general, and the requirement for the attorney general to appoint a solicitor general, designate their duties, and grant them a salary. The bill was signed into law by Governor Andy Beshear on March 24.

== List of solicitors general ==
No.	Portrait	Name	Term of office	Attorney General
1		Chad Meredith	2019–2021	Daniel Cameron
2		Matt Kuhn	2021–present	Daniel Cameron Russell Coleman

== Notable cases ==
- Cameron v. EMW Women's Surgical Center
