= Justice Sunday =

Justice Sunday was a series of religious conferences organized by the Family Research Council, founded by James Dobson and headed by Tony Perkins, and Dobson's Focus on the Family organizations. According to FRC, the purpose of the events was to "request an end to filibusters of judicial nominees that were based, at least in part, on the nominees' religious views or imputed inability to decide cases on the basis of the law regardless of their beliefs." Three such conferences were held. Perkins and Dobson have been present as speakers at all events, and some conservative politicians, including Zell Miller, Tom DeLay and Bill Frist have also made appearances.

== Justice Sunday: April 24, 2005 ==
The first Justice Sunday, subtitled "Stopping the Filibuster Against People of Faith," was organized primarily to protest a perceived bias on the part of the Federal Judiciary of the United States. The organizers hoped to provoke large numbers of evangelical Christians to place pressure on U.S. Senators to bring an end to the filibuster of nominees to the Federal Judiciary made by President George W. Bush. Their web site featured a letter dated April 20, 2005, four days before the event took place, which sought to assuage churches' fears of challenges to their tax-exempt status under laws prohibiting political activity by tax-exempt churches . The two sponsoring organizations did not choose to sponsor the program directly, but did so through their legally separate lobbying organizations FRC Action and Focus on the Family Action .

The nationally televised event took place at Highview Baptist Church in Louisville, Kentucky. The program featured James Dobson, R. Albert Mohler, Jr., Watergate-convicted criminal-turned-evangelical Charles Colson and, via videotape, Republican U.S. Senate Majority Leader Bill Frist.

The organizers of the event were criticized for holding this event, dubbed "Just-us Sunday" by some critics. Some felt that this was an attempt to demonize opponents of conservatives as being against religion; others felt that this was an attempt to politicize religion. Still others felt that this was an attempt to undermine the independence of the Federal Judiciary. Among those opposed to the event were a number of religious leaders from a wide spectrum of faiths — including Catholic, Jewish, Protestant, and Eastern Orthodox leaders.

An equally successful counter rally was held at Central Presbyterian Church in Louisville, KY called "Social Justice Sunday." Here, speakers such as Jim Wallis reaffirmed their support of the United States Justice System towards people of faith. Furthermore, they voiced their opinions that the actions at Highview Baptist Church did not speak for them.

== Justice Sunday II: August 14, 2005 ==
A sequel to the first Justice Sunday, subtitled "God Save the United States and this Honorable Court" event was held on August 14, 2005 in Nashville, Tennessee. Conspicuously absent from the event was U. S. Senate Majority Leader Bill Frist, who had recently drawn fire for departing from U. S. President George W. Bush's policy on stem cell research.

Speakers included Tony Perkins, James Dobson, Robert H. Bork, Tom DeLay, Zell Miller, Chuck Colson, Phyllis Schlafly, William A. Donohue, Harry R. Jackson, Jr., and Dr. Jerry Sutton.

== Justice Sunday III: January 8, 2006 ==
A third Justice Sunday event, subtitled "Proclaim Liberty Throughout the Land" took place January 8, 2006, the day before Samuel Alito's confirmation hearings for the Supreme Court began. The event took place in Philadelphia, Pennsylvania at the Greater Exodus Baptist Church.

Greater Exodus is led by Pastor Herbert H. Lusk, II. Lusk explains his reasoning by saying, that he wants the government to "appoint people to the justice system that would be attentive to the needs I care about - stopping same-sex marriage, assisted suicide and abortions for minors and supporting prayer and Christmas celebrations in school."

James Dobson, Tony Perkins and Jerry Falwell took part as speakers, as well as Alveda King and Rick Santorum. Members from the local community and various organizations including Planned Parenthood and The World Can't Wait stood outside and protested the event.
