= Rebecca Jackson (politician) =

American politician

5th Judge/Executive of Jefferson County
- In office January 4, 1999 – January 6, 2003
- Preceded by: David L. Armstrong
- Succeeded by: Ken Herndon

Personal details
- Party: Republican

Rebecca Jackson is a former Republican politician from Louisville, Kentucky. She previously served as the Jefferson County Judge/Executive and also ran unsuccessfully for the Republican party nomination for governor. She is the former chief executive officer of the WHAS Crusade for Children, a local charity that operates a large annual telethon.

== Early life ==
Jackson was born in Short Creek in Grayson County. She graduated from Southern High School in Louisville and earned bachelor's and master's degrees from the University of Louisville. She served as a teacher, first for first grade and later serving special needs students, and administrator in the Jefferson County Public Schools system. In 1987, Jackson founded JobCenter, an employment agency serving the disabled.

== Political career ==
Jackson first won elected office in 1989, upsetting long-time Democratic incumbent Jefferson County clerk Jim Malone. She was re-elected in 1993. In 1998, Jackson ran for and won the race for Judge/Executive; she was sworn in on January 1, 1999, and served one term. She was the last person to serve in that office before city and county governments merged in 2002; the office was largely replaced by the Mayor of Louisville Metro, though technically the office still exists in a largely ceremonial capacity. Jackson had been a staunch proponent of a consolidated city-county government.

== Activism career ==
Jackson ran for governor in 2003, losing in the primary election to Ernie Fletcher, who eventually won the seat.

Jackson joined the WHAS Crusade for Children in 2005, the first person from outside the WHAS-TV corporate structure to hold the post. She was instrumental in establishing an endowment for the telethon, funded by bequests from people who left donations to the Crusade in their wills. The endowment is designed to fund the day-to-day operating expenses of the organization, allowing 100 percent of the donations collected from the general public to go directly to agencies providing direct services to children with special needs.

Jackson is the author of the children's book Mackenzie And The Baby Robin. Released in 2004, the book has a religious message and features her oldest grandchild, Mackenzie. The book was illustrated by her cousin, Richard Wayne Thompson.

== Personal life ==
On the web site of her gubernatorial campaign, Jackson listed her "first home" as Short Creek, Kentucky.

Jackson has been married to Ralph W. Jackson since 1969. The couple has three sons, three granddaughters, a grandson, two step-granddaughters and a foster daughter.

Jackson is also active in her church, Highview Baptist Church. In 1980, she founded Kentucky's New Horizons, a ministry of Highview Baptist that is a social-recreation program for adults with handicaps. She has directed it ever since. In 2006, she was appointed by Governor Fletcher to the Board of Trustees for the University of Louisville.

Legal offices
Preceded by David L. Armstrong	Jefferson County Judge/Executive (Kentucky); 1999–2003	Succeeded by Ken Herndon (ceremonial capacity only)
