= Phil Moffett =

American politician

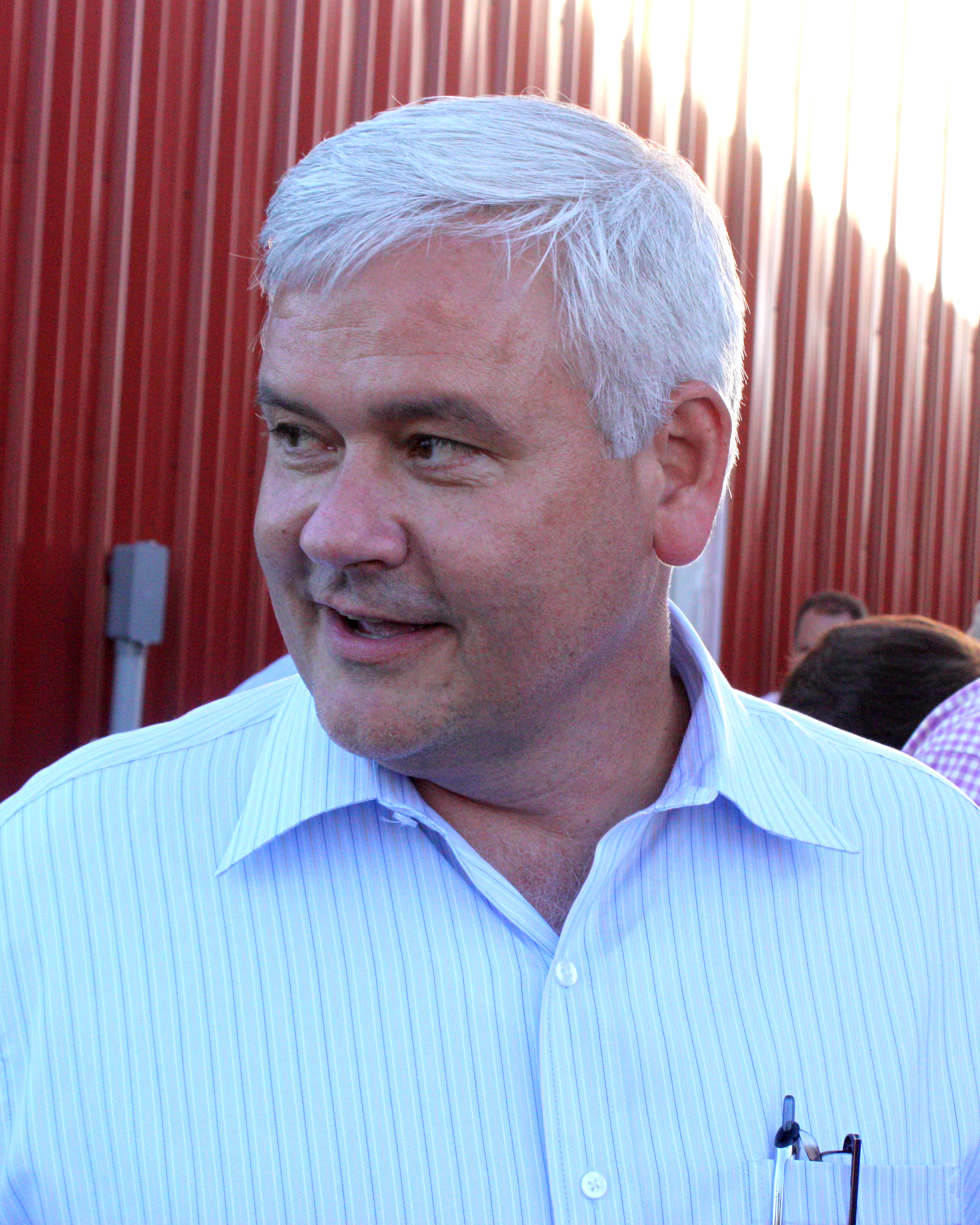
- Moffett in 2010

Member of the Kentucky House of Representatives from the 32nd district
- In office January 1, 2015 – January 1, 2019
- Preceded by: Julie Raque Adams
- Succeeded by: Tina Bojanowski

Personal details
- Born: December 13, 1962 (age 63)
- Party: Republican
- Education: University of Kentucky

Phillip Joseph Moffett (born December 13, 1962) is an American politician from Kentucky who was a member of the Kentucky House of Representatives from 2015 to 2019. Moffett was an unsuccessful candidate for governor in 2011, losing the Republican nomination to David Williams. He was first elected to the house in 2014 following the retirement of incumbent Julie Raque Adams to run for the Kentucky Senate. He was defeated for reelection in 2018 by Democrat Tina Bojanowski.
