= Robert F. Matthews Jr. =

American lawyer and politician (1923–2010)

Robert Foster Matthews Jr. (September 14, 1923 – October 30, 2010) was an American lawyer and politician.

Born in Shelbyville, Kentucky, Matthews served in the United States Navy during World War II. He received his bachelor's degree from the College of William & Mary and his law degree from the University of Virginia School of Law. Matthews practiced law and served as Kentucky Commissioner of Finance from 1960 to 1963. From 1964 to 1968, Matthews served as Kentucky Attorney General. In 1967, he ran for the office of Lieutenant Governor of Kentucky and lost the election to Wendell Ford. After he left office, Matthews continued to practice law and was chief administrative hearing officer for the city of Louisville and later Shelbyville, Kentucky.

== Notes ==
Party political offices
Preceded by John B. Breckinridge	Democratic nominee for Attorney General of Kentucky; 1963	Succeeded by John B. Breckinridge
Legal offices
Preceded by John Bayne Breckinridge	Attorney General of Kentucky; 1964–1968	Succeeded by John Bayne Breckinridge
