= Mike Denham =

American politician member of the Kentucky House of Representatives

Member of the Kentucky House of Representatives from the 70th district
- In office January 1, 2001 – January 1, 2017
- Preceded by: Pete Worthington
- Succeeded by: John Sims Jr.

Personal details
- Born: April 4, 1950 (age 76) Maysville, Kentucky
- Party: Democratic
- Education: Maysville Community and Technical College; University of Kentucky; Morehead State University

Mitchel B. "Mike" Denham Jr. (born April 4, 1950, in Maysville, Kentucky) is an American politician, serving as a Democratic member of the Kentucky House of Representatives representing District 70 from 2001 to 2017. In December 2015, Denham announced that he would not seek re-election in 2016, citing health issues.

== Education ==
Denham earned his associate degree from Maysville Community and Technical College, his BS from the University of Kentucky, and his MA in business administration from Morehead State University.

== Elections ==
- 2012 Denham was unopposed for both the May 22, 2012 Democratic Primary and the November 6, 2012 General election, winning with 12,301 votes.
- 2000 When District 70 Representative Pete Worthington left the Legislature and left the seat open, Denham was unopposed for the 2000 Democratic Primary and won the November 7, 2000 General election with 9,294 votes (98.7%) against a write-in candidate.
- 2002 Denham was unopposed for both the 2002 Democratic Primary and also the November 5, 2002 General election, winning with 7,809 votes.
- 2004 Denham was unopposed for the 2004 Democratic Primary and won the November 2, 2004 General election with 10,461 votes (64.8%) against Republican nominee Dale Jefferson.
- 2006 Denham unopposed for both the 2006 Democratic Primary and the November 7, 2006 General election, winning with 11,453 votes.
- 2008 Denham was unopposed for both the 2008 Democratic Primary and the November 4, 2008 General election, winning with 13,332 votes.
- 2010 Denham was unopposed for both the May 18, 2010 Democratic Primary and the November 2, 2010 General election, winning with 10,881 votes.
