= Deon Yelder =

American football player (born 1995)

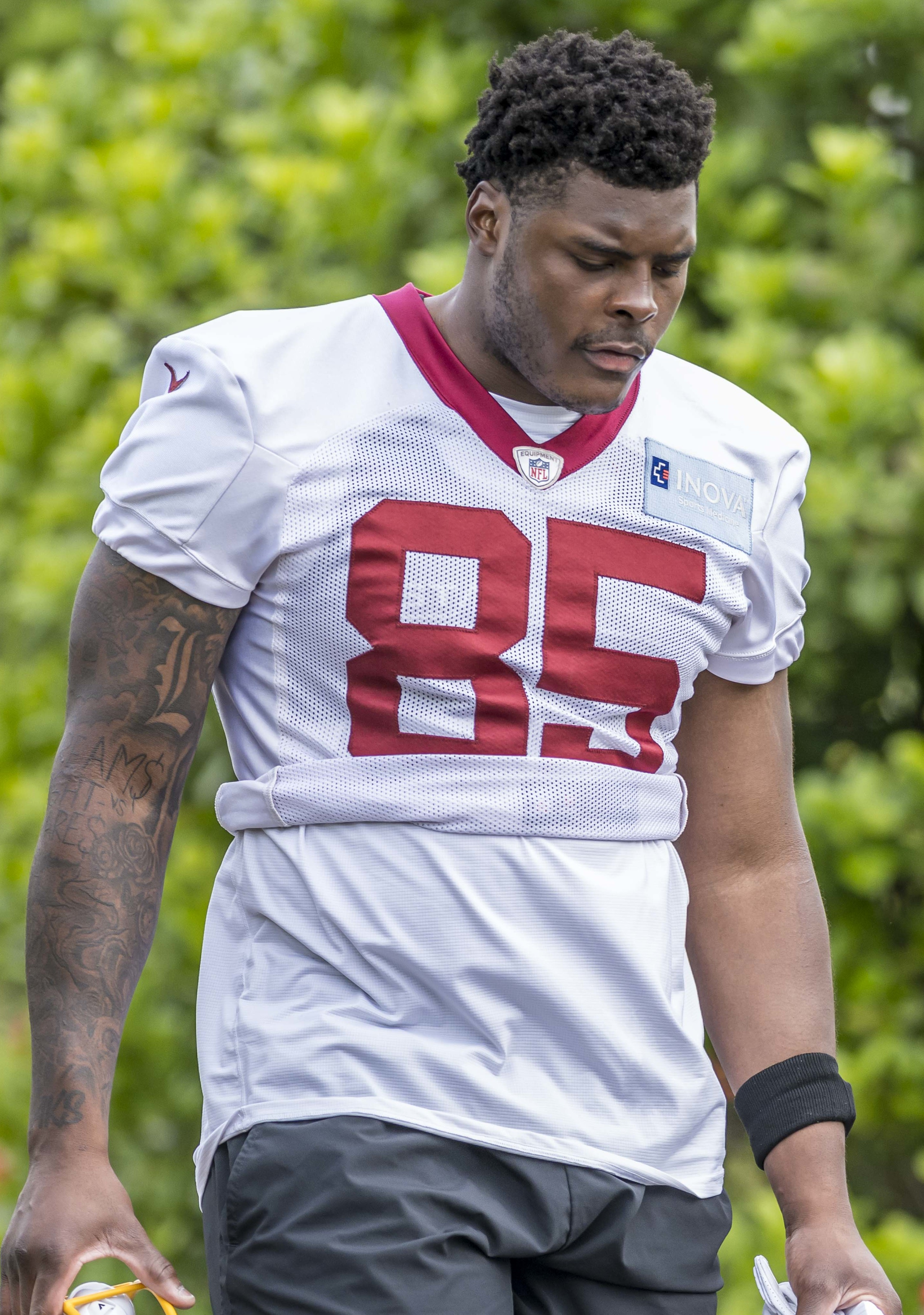
- Yelder with the Washington Football Team in 2021

No. 82, 85
- Position: Tight end

Personal information
- Born: March 6, 1995 (age 31); Louisville, Kentucky, U.S.
- Listed height: 6 ft 4 in (1.93 m)
- Listed weight: 255 lb (116 kg)

Career information
- High school: Southern (Louisville)
- College: Western Kentucky
- NFL draft: 2018: undrafted

Career history
- New Orleans Saints (2018)*; Kansas City Chiefs (2018–2020); Washington Football Team (2021)*; Tennessee Titans (2021)*; Tampa Bay Buccaneers (2021); New York Giants (2021)*; Arizona Cardinals (2022)*; San Antonio Brahmas (2023)
- * Offseason or practice squad member only

Awards and highlights
- Super Bowl champion (LIV); Third-team All-Conference USA (2017)

Career NFL statistics
- Receptions: 11
- Receiving yards: 86
- Stats at Pro Football Reference

Deon Yelder (born March 6, 1995) is an American former professional football player who was a tight end in the National Football League (NFL). He played college football for the Western Kentucky Hilltoppers and signed with the New Orleans Saints as an undrafted free agent in 2018. Yelder won a Super Bowl title as part of the Kansas City Chiefs in Super Bowl LIV.

== Early life ==
Yelder was born and raised in Louisville, Kentucky and attended Southern High School. He originally only played basketball at Southern and did not play football until his junior year.

== College career ==
Yelder began his career at Western Kentucky as a walk-on and redshirted his freshman season. He saw his first collegiate action during his redshirt sophomore season, playing special teams, and did not catch his first career pass until his redshirt junior season. He earned a scholarship going into his redshirt senior season and finished the season with 52 receptions for 688 yards and eight total touchdowns and was named third-team All-Conference USA. Yelder's performance earned him an invitation to the 2017 NFLPA Collegiate Bowl and a late invitation to the 2017 Senior Bowl, where he scored a touchdown on a one-yard reception from quarterback Kyle Lauletta.

== Professional career ==
Pre-draft measurables
Height	Weight	Arm length	Hand span	40-yard dash	10-yard split	20-yard split	20-yard shuttle	Three-cone drill	Vertical jump	Broad jump	Bench press
6 ft 3 1/4 in (1.91 m)	255 lb (116 kg)	33 in (0.84 m)	10 1/8 in (0.26 m)	4.78 s	1.62 s	2.72 s	4.64 s	7.32 s	33.0 in (0.84 m)	10 ft 0 in (3.05 m)	18 reps
All values from Pro Day

=== New Orleans Saints ===
Yelder was signed by the New Orleans Saints as an undrafted free agent on May 2, 2018, and received a signing bonus of $90,000. He was cut at the end of training camp and subsequently re-signed to the team's practice squad on September 2. Yelder was released by the Saints on October 3.

=== Kansas City Chiefs ===
Yelder was signed to the Kansas City Chiefs' practice squad on October 4, 2018. He was promoted by the Chiefs to their active roster on October 23. Yelder made NFL debut on October 28, in a 30–23 win against the Denver Broncos, appearing on special teams. He appeared in three games on special teams during his rookie season.

Yelder caught his first career pass, a 24-yard reception from Patrick Mahomes, in a 34–30 win over the Detroit Lions in 2019. He played in all three of the Chiefs playoff games, catching a pass for 11 yards in the team's Divisional Round win over the Houston Texans and playing in the Chiefs' victory over the San Francisco 49ers in Super Bowl LIV.

Yelder signed a one-year exclusive-rights free agent tender with the Chiefs on April 20, 2020. He was placed on injured reserve on January 16, 2021. On February 6, Yelder was activated off of injured reserve ahead of Super Bowl LV against the Tampa Bay Buccaneers.

=== Washington Football Team ===
Yelder signed with the Washington Football Team on May 5, 2021, but was waived prior to the season on July 27.

=== Tennessee Titans ===
Yelder signed with the Tennessee Titans on August 15, 2021, but was waived the next day.

=== Tampa Bay Buccaneers ===
On September 1, 2021, Yelder signed with the Tampa Bay Buccaneers' practice squad. He was released by the Buccaneers on November 10.

=== New York Giants ===
On November 25, 2021, Yelder signed with the New York Giants' practice squad. His contract expired when the teams season ended on January 9, 2022.

=== Arizona Cardinals ===
On January 19, 2022, Yelder signed a reserve/future contract with the Arizona Cardinals. He was released by the Cardinals on August 19.

=== San Antonio Brahmas ===
The San Antonio Brahmas selected Yelder in the 13th round of the 2023 XFL Supplemental Draft on January 1, 2023. He was removed from the roster on September 1.
