= Lawson Walker =

American politician (1949–2013)

Member of the Kentucky House of Representatives from the 66th district
- In office January 1, 1987 – January 1, 1993
- Preceded by: Barry G. Caldwell
- Succeeded by: Charlie Walton

Personal details
- Born: 1949
- Died: September 9, 2013 (aged 64)
- Party: Republican

Henry Lawson Walker II (1949 – September 9, 2013) was an American politician from Kentucky who was a member of the Kentucky House of Representatives from 1987 to 1993. Walker was first elected to the house in 1986 after incumbent representative Barry G. Caldwell did not seek reelection. Walker retired from the house in 1992 after unsuccessfully running for lieutenant governor in 1991.

Walker died on September 9, 2013.
