= Faith Under Fire =

- Starring: Lee Strobel
- Country of origin: United States
- Original language: English
- No. of seasons: 2
- No. of episodes: 26

Original release
- Network: PAX TV
- Release: October 2, 2004 – July 2, 2005

Faith Under Fire is an American television series hosted by Lee Strobel that aired on PAX TV from October 2, 2004, to July 2, 2005.

== History ==
In 2004, Lee Strobel, an American Evangelical Christian author and a former investigative journalist, founded the Christian apologetics show Faith Under Fire.

In the main segments, two guests would discuss current issues related to Christianity. It aired every Saturday at 10pm EST on PAX TV.

In segments following commercial breaks, people on the street were interviewed on the same topics. Guests included Randy Alcorn, Michael Shermer, Deepak Chopra, Shabir Ally, Tovia Singer and Julia Sweeney. Its final episode aired July 2, 2005, less than a month before PAX TV changed its name to i: Independent Television on July 1, 2005. When the network underwent some turmoil, it cancelled production of all of its original programming including Faith Under Fire.

== Episodes ==
=== Season 1 (2004) ===
1. "The End of Faith" – February 10, 2004
2. "Is the Supernatural Real?" – September 10, 2004
3. "Embryos: Cells or Souls?" – October 16, 2004
4. "Why Evangelize Jews?" – October 23, 2004
5. "Are the Media Anti-Faith?" – October 30, 2004
6. "The Kabbalah Craze" – June 11, 2004"
7. "Islam: Peace or Terror" – November 13, 2004
8. "Porn Again?" – November 20, 2004"
9. "Jesus: Divine or Prophet?" – November 27, 2004
10. "What Color is Your God?" – August 1, 2005
11. "Faith in the City" – November 12, 2004
12. "Public School Exodus" – December 18, 2004
13. "Legalizing Drugs" – December 25, 2004

=== Season 2 (2005) ===
1. "Culture Wars" – February 26, 2005
2. "Tough Faith Questions" – May 3, 2005
3. "Politics and Religion" – December 3, 2005
4. "Women and Faith" – March 19, 2005
5. "The Jesus Debate" – March 26, 2005
6. "The Contemporary Church" – February 4, 2005
7. "A Potpourri of Faith" – September 4, 2005
8. "Current Controversies" – April 16, 2005
9. "Faith Under Scrutiny" – April 23, 2005
10. "The Future of Faith" – April 30, 2005
11. "Islam: The Issues" – May 14, 2005
12. "Hot Topics" – May 28, 2005
13. "Bible Controversies" – April 6, 2005 – Includes a discussion and debate about the so-called Bible code.

== Curriculum ==
A small-group curriculum called Faith Under Fire has been produced on DVD, which features clips from the show as part of a discussion-oriented experience for both Christians and spiritual seekers. Its publisher is Zondervan. The DVDs are:

- Faith Under Fire 1: Faith & Jesus
- Faith Under Fire 2: Faith & Facts
- Faith Under Fire 3: Tough Faith Questions
- Faith Under Fire 4: A New Kind of Faith
