= Lee Strobel =

American author and journalist (born 1952)

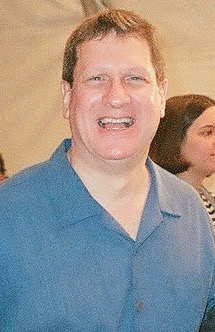
- Strobel in 2007
- Born: Lee Patrick Strobel; January 25, 1952 (age 74); Arlington Heights, Illinois, U.S.
- Education: University of Missouri (BA); Yale University (MSL)
- Occupations: Legal editor; writer; journalist; Baptist pastor; professor
- Spouse: Leslie Strobel
- Children: 2
- Writing career
- Genres: Christology; Historicity of the Gospels
- Subject: Christian apologetics
- Website: leestrobel.com

Lee Patrick Strobel (born January 25, 1952) is an American Christian author, Baptist pastor, professor, and a former investigative journalist. He has written several books, including four that received ECPA Christian Book Awards (1994, 1999, 2001, 2005) and a series which addresses challenges to the veracity of Christianity. He also hosted a television program called Faith Under Fire on PAX TV and runs a video apologetics web site.

== Early life and education ==
Lee Patrick Strobel was born on January 25, 1952, in Arlington Heights, Illinois. He received a journalism degree from the University of Missouri and a Master of Studies in Law degree from Yale Law School.

== Career ==
Lee was a journalist for the Chicago Tribune and other newspapers for 14 years. In 1980, the UPI Illinois Editors Association newspaper award program gave him a first place for public service (the Len H. Small Memorial award) for his coverage of the Ford Pinto crash trial involving a class-action lawsuit against the Ford Motor Company in Winamac, Indiana. Strobel later became assistant managing editor of the Daily Herald, before leaving journalism in 1987.

Strobel has said he was an atheist when he began investigating the biblical claims about Jesus Christ after his wife's conversion. Prompted by the results of his investigation, he became a Christian at the age of 29.

== Ministry ==
Strobel was teaching pastor of Willow Creek Community Church in South Barrington, Illinois, from 1987 to 2000. In 2000, he became pastor at Saddleback Church in Lake Forest, California. In 2004, he left his post as pastor to host the Christian apologetics show Faith Under Fire. In 2014, he became a teaching pastor at Woodlands Church in The Woodlands, Texas, and a professor of Christian thought at Houston Baptist University.

In 2020, he founded the Lee Strobel Center for Evangelism and Applied Apologetics at Colorado Christian University.

== Recognition ==
In 2007, he was awarded an honorary doctoral degree by Southern Evangelical Seminary in recognition of his contributions to Christian apologetics.

== Personal life ==
Strobel and his wife Leslie have two children and several grandchildren. His daughter Alison is a novelist, and his son Kyle is an assistant professor of Spiritual Theology and Formation at the Talbot School of Theology.

== Film ==
Strobel appeared in the 2016 film God's Not Dead 2.

A film titled The Case for Christ, based on Strobel's book, had its theatrical release in April 2017. The film was directed by Jonathan M. Gunn and is about an atheist reporter who tries to prove Christianity to be a cult.

== Bibliography ==
- Reckless Homicide? Ford's Pinto Trial (1980) ISBN 0-89708-022-X
- Inside the Mind of Unchurched Harry and Mary (1993) ISBN 0-310-37561-4
- What Jesus Would Say (1994) ISBN 0-310-48511-8
- God's Outrageous Claims (1998) ISBN 0-310-26612-2
- Surviving a Spiritual Mismatch in Marriage (2002) ISBN 0-310-22014-9
- Experiencing the Passion of Jesus (2004), with Garry Poole, Zondervan, ISBN 0-310-26375-1
- Discussing the Da Vinci Code: Exploring the Issues Raised by the Book and Movie (2006) ISBN 0-310-27263-7
- The Unexpected Adventure: Taking Everyday Risks to Talk with People about Jesus (May 29, 2009), Zondervan, ISBN 0-310-28392-2
- Today's Moment of Truth: Devotions to Deepen Your Faith in Christ (July 12, 2016), Zondervan, ISBN 0-310-35940-6

=== "The Case for..." series ===
- The Case for Christ: A Journalist's Personal Investigation of the Evidence for Jesus (September 1, 1998), Zondervan, ISBN 0-310-22605-8
- The Case for Faith: A Journalist Investigates the Toughest Objections to Christianity (October 1, 2000), Zondervan, ISBN 0-310-22015-7
- The Case for a Creator: A Journalist Investigates Scientific Evidence That Points Toward God (2004), Zondervan, ISBN 0-310-26386-7
- The Case for Easter: Journalist Investigates the Evidence for the Resurrection (2004), Zondervan, ISBN 0-310-25475-2
- The Case for Christmas: A Journalist Investigates the Identity of the Child in the Manger (2005), Zondervan, ISBN 0-310-25476-0
- The Case for the Real Jesus: A Journalist Investigates Current Attacks on the Identity of Christ (September 10, 2007), Zondervan, ISBN 0-310-24210-X
- The Case for Christianity Answer Book (July 1, 2014), Zondervan, ISBN 0-310-33955-3
- The Case for Hope: Looking Ahead with Confidence and Courage (2015), Zondervan, ISBN 0-310-33957-X
- The Case for Grace: A Journalist Explores the Evidence of Transformed Lives (2015), Zondervan, ISBN 0-310-25923-1
- In Defense of Jesus: Investigating Attacks on the Identity of Christ (2016)
- The Case for Miracles: A Journalist Investigates Evidence for the Supernatural (2018)
- The Case for Heaven: A Journalist Investigates Evidence for Life After Death (2021)
- Is God Real? Exploring the Ultimate Question of Life (2023)
- Seeing the Supernatural: Investigating Angels, Demons, Mystical Dreams, Near-Death Encounters, and Other Mysteries of the Unseen World (2025)

=== Children's apologetics series ===
- The Case for Faith for Kids (2006), Zonderkidz, ISBN 978-0-310-71146-9
- The Case for Christ for Kids (2006), Zonderkidz, ISBN 978-0-310-71147-6
- A Case for a Creator for Kids (2006), Zonderkidz, ISBN 978-0-310-71148-3
- Off My Case for Kids: 12 Stories to Help You Defend Your Faith (2006), Zonderkidz, ISBN 978-0-310-71199-5

=== Novels ===
- The Ambition: A Novel (May 14, 2011), Zondervan, ISBN 9780310334224
