= Pete Worthington =

American politician

Speaker pro tempore of the Kentucky House of Representatives
- In office January 8, 1985 – January 6, 1993
- Preceded by: Don Blandford
- Succeeded by: Larry Clark

Member of the Kentucky House of Representatives from the 70th district
- In office January 1, 1978 – October 12, 2000
- Preceded by: Mitchel Denham
- Succeeded by: Mike Denham

Personal details
- Born: 1940
- Died: October 12, 2000 (aged 59)
- Party: Democratic

Pete Worthington (1940 – October 12, 2000) was an American politician from Kentucky who was a member of the Kentucky House of Representatives from 1978 to 2000. Worthington was first elected in 1977, succeeding incumbent representative Mitchel Denham. In October 2000 Worthington, who was driving drunk, died in a car crash. He had been unopposed for the 2000 election and was replaced on the ballot by Mike Denham, Mitchel's son.
