= Laban Jackson =

American business executive (born 1943)

Laban P. Jackson, Jr.
- Born: 1943 (age 82–83)
- Education: United States Military Academy

Laban P. Jackson Jr. (born 1943) is an American businessman who is the chairman and CEO of Clear Creek Properties. He was a director of The Home Depot from 2004–2008, and IPIX from 2000–2006.

== Career ==
In 1965, Jackson graduated from the United States Military Academy. From 1987–1992, Jackson was a director of the Federal Reserve Bank of Cleveland. From 1993, he served as a Director of Bank One Corporation until 2004 when it was acquired by JPMorgan Chase. Since 2004, he has been an Independent Director of JPMorgan Chase.

In March 2020, JPMorgan announced in a regulatory filing that Jackson had decided to retire from the board when his term expires on the eve of the 2020 annual meeting of shareholders.
