= Family Research Council =

American evangelical activist group

- Logo
- Founded: 1983; 43 years ago
- Founder: James Dobson
- Type: 501(c)(3) non-profit organization
- Tax ID no.: 52-1792772 (EIN)
- Location: 801 G St NW, Washington, D.C.
- Region served: United States
- Key people: Tony Perkins, President; Thomas R. Anderson, Chairman
- Revenue: $22,031,968 (2023)
- Expenses: $21,980,863 (2023)
- Employees: 116
- Website: frc.org

The Family Research Council (FRC) is an American evangelical 501(c)(3) non-profit activist group and think-tank with an affiliated lobbying organization. FRC promotes what it considers to be family values. It opposes and lobbies against access to pornography, embryonic stem-cell research, abortion, divorce, and LGBT rights—such as anti-discrimination laws, same-sex marriage, same-sex civil unions, and LGBT adoption. The FRC has been criticized by media sources and professional organizations such as the American Sociological Association for using "anti-gay pseudoscience" to falsely conflate homosexuality and pedophilia, and to falsely claim that the children of same-sex parents suffer from more mental health problems.

FRC was formed in the United States in 1981 by James Dobson and incorporated in 1983. In the late 1980s, FRC officially became a division of Dobson's main organization, Focus on the Family; however, after an administrative separation, FRC became an independent entity in 1992. Tony Perkins is its current president. FRC is affiliated with a lobbying PAC known as FRC Action, of which Josh Duggar was the executive director from 2013 until 2015.

The FRC is active outside of the United States; in 2010, FRC paid $25,000 to congressional lobbyists for what they described as "Res.1064 Ugandan Resolution Pro-homosexual promotion" in a lobbying disclosure report. Uganda would go on to pass the Uganda Anti-Homosexuality Bill, a bill which would have imposed either the death penalty or life imprisonment for sexual relations between persons of the same sex. On August 1, 2014, however, the Constitutional Court of Uganda ruled the act invalid on procedural grounds.

In 2010, the Southern Poverty Law Center classified FRC as an anti-LGBT hate group due to what it says are the group's "false claims about the LGBT community based on discredited research and junk science" in an effort to block LGBT civil rights. In 2012, the FRC's headquarters were attacked by a gunman, resulting in an injury to a security guard. The gunman later told investigators he selected the organization as a target after seeing it listed as an anti-LGBT hate group by the SPLC.

== History ==
The Council was incorporated as a nonprofit organization in 1983. James Dobson, Armand Nicholi Jr., and George Rekers were some of its founding board members. In 1988, following financial difficulties, FRC was incorporated into Focus on the Family, and Gary Bauer joined the organization as president. FRC remained under the Focus on the Family umbrella until 1992, when it separated out of concern for Focus' tax-exempt status. Tony Perkins joined FRC as its president in 2003.

On June 18, 2013, Josh Duggar was named executive director of FRC Action, the non-profit and tax-exempt legislative action arm of Family Research Council. Duggar resigned his position on May 21, 2015, after his history of sexual misconduct as a minor became public.

=== 2012 shooting ===
On August 15, 2012, Floyd Lee Corkins II, a resident of nearby Herndon, Virginia, entered the lobby of the FRC's Washington, D.C., headquarters with a 9mm pistol and two magazines with 50 rounds of ammunition. Corkins shot an unarmed security guard, 46-year-old Leonardo Johnson, in the left arm. Although injured, Johnson assisted others who wrestled Corkins to the ground until police arrived and placed him under arrest. Politico reported that "Corkins was carrying 15 Chick-fil-A sandwiches that he intended to smear on employees’ faces in a political statement, he told the FBI."

The FBI and the Metropolitan Police Department investigated jointly "to determine motive/intent and whether a hate crime/terrorism nexus exists." During his FBI interview, Corkins was asked how he chose his target. His response was "Southern Poverty Law lists anti-gay groups. I found them online." Corkins had told Johnson "words to the effect of 'I don't like your politics.'" Corkins had served as a volunteer at an LGBT community center.

In January 2013, Corkins pleaded guilty to two charges in the District of Columbia, possession of a handgun during a violent crime and assault with intent to kill, and interstate transportation of a firearm and ammunition, a federal charge. He was found mentally ill and, in September 2013, was sentenced to 25 years in prison.

On the day of the shooting, a joint statement of 25 LGBT groups condemned Corkins's action. The SPLC also condemned the shooting, but refused to take the FRC off its hate map.

The National Organization for Marriage, an active campaigner against same-sex marriage, issued a statement saying "Today's attack is the clearest sign we've seen that labeling pro-marriage groups as 'hateful' must end".

FRC president Tony Perkins issued a public statement calling the shooting "an act of domestic terrorism" and criticizing the Southern Poverty Law Center for being "reckless in labeling organizations as hate groups because they disagree with them on public policy." SPLC spokesman Mark Potok called Perkins's accusation "outrageous", and in a statement said: "The FRC and its allies on the religious right are saying, in effect, that offering legitimate and fact-based criticism in a democratic society is tantamount to suggesting that the objects of criticism should be the targets of criminal violence." Potok posted that "The SPLC has listed the FRC as a hate group since 2010 because it has knowingly spread false and denigrating propaganda about LGBT people—not, as some claim, because it opposes same-sex marriage."

== Politics, policies and positions ==
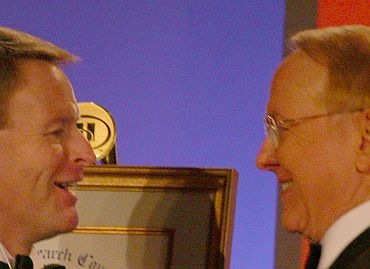
Tony Perkins and James Dobson at the Values Voters conference in Washington, D.C., 2007

Tony Perkins has blamed the constitutional separation of church and state for encouraging the rise of ISIS and similar Islamic extremist groups.

The FRC has opposed efforts to make the human papilloma virus (HPV) vaccine mandatory for school attendance. HPV is a virus that can be transmitted by sexual contact, that can cause cervical cancer. FRC defends its position on the basis of the rights of parents and because of its support for abstinence prior to marriage.

It supports a federal conscience clause, allowing medical workers to refuse to provide certain treatments to their patients, such as abortion or birth control. It also advocates for abstinence-only sex education, intelligent design, prayer in public schools and the regulation of pornography and other "obscene, indecent, or profane programming" on broadcast and cable television. It unsuccessfully opposed the introduction of an .xxx domain name and lobbied for an increase in indecency fines from the Federal Communications Commission. The group holds that hotel pornography may be prosecutable under federal and state obscenity laws. It opposed the expansion of civil rights laws to include sexual orientation and gender identity as illegal bases for discrimination.

Family Research Council supports the requirement of a one-year waiting period before a married couple with children can legally get a divorce so that they can receive marital counseling, unless the marriage involves domestic violence. FRC also supports permanently eliminating the marriage penalty and estate taxes.

The Council opposes legalized abortion, stem-cell research which involves the destruction of human embryos and funding thereof. (It advocates for research solely using adult stem cells.) It opposes legal recognition of same-sex domestic partnerships in the form of marriage or civil unions. It has opposed all forms of gambling. The Council has questioned whether humans are mainly or completely responsible for climate change, and has opposed other evangelicals who accepted the scientific consensus on it.

=== Statements on homosexuality ===
The FRC maintains that "homosexual conduct is harmful to the persons who engage in it and to society at large, and can never be affirmed", and asserts that it is "by definition unnatural, and as such is associated with negative physical and psychological health effects." The Council also asserts that "there is no convincing evidence that a homosexual identity is ever something genetic or inborn". These positions are in opposition to the consensus of mainstream psychological and medical experts that homosexuality is a normal, healthy variation of human behavior, and that sexual orientation is generally not chosen.

Certain FRC statements and positions have been criticized as based upon pseudo/junk science; according to Wired, the group has misrepresented data and mis-designed sociological studies in order to negatively depict LGBT people.

FRC also states that "[s]ympathy must be extended to those who struggle with unwanted same-sex attractions, and every effort should be made to assist such persons to overcome those attractions, as many already have". Evidence on the effectiveness of sexual orientation change efforts is limited; according to a 2009 publication from the American Psychological Association, "[there] are no studies of adequate scientific rigor to conclude whether or not recent [sexual orientation change efforts] do or do not work to change a person's sexual orientation."

In 2012, Rob Schwartzwalder, then a senior vice president at FRC, wrote: "To love people who identify as gays or lesbians means to extend grace to them: to welcome them as friends, to care for them when ill, and to respect them as persons whose creation was ordained by the God of the universe and for whom the Son of God died. Such love will oppose attempts to legalize homosexual marriage, as to do so would vindicate a corruption of that which God intended. ... To love homosexuals means that believing churches cannot accept those practicing or advocating homosexuality as members, ministers, or leaders any more than persons living in any other kind of sexual sin."

Jointly with Focus on the Family, the Council submitted an amicus brief in Lawrence v. Texas, the U.S. Supreme Court case in which anti-sodomy laws were ruled unconstitutional on privacy grounds. The summary of the amicus curiae brief declares that "[states] may discourage the 'evils' ... of sexual acts outside of marriage by means up to and including criminal prohibition" and that it is constitutionally permissible for Texas to "choose to protect marital intimacy by prohibiting same-sex 'deviate'^{a} acts".

Similar positions have been advocated by representatives of the organization since Lawrence was decided in 2003. In February 2010, Family Research Council's senior researcher for policy studies, Peter Sprigg, stated on NBC's Hardball that same-sex behavior should be outlawed and that "criminal sanctions against homosexual behavior" should be enforced. Three months later, in May 2010, Sprigg publicly suggested that repealing the Don't Ask, Don't Tell policy would encourage molestation of heterosexual service members.

In November 2010, Perkins was asked about Sprigg's comments regarding the criminalization of same-sex behavior: he responded that criminalizing homosexuality is not a goal of Family Research Council. Perkins repeated FRC's association of homosexuals with pedophilia, stating: "If you look at the American College of Pediatricians, they say the research is overwhelming that homosexuality poses a danger to children." Perkins' statements have been contradicted by mainstream social science research, and the likelihood of child molestation by homosexuals and bisexuals has been found to be no higher than child molestation by heterosexuals; as Newsweek put it, "[f]or decades, the [FRC] has smeared homosexuals in its publications, insinuating that gay people are more likely to sexually abuse children" and an analysis by John Aravosis concluded that FRC "cherry-picks and distorts evidence as part of a deliberate campaign to smear the LGBT community." Some scientists whose work is cited by the socially conservative group the American College of Pediatricians – which was created following the American Academy of Pediatrics' endorsement of adoption by same-sex couples and to which FRC points for evidence supporting its positions – have said the organization has distorted or misrepresented their work and the organization has been criticized by Psychology Today for making "false statements ... that have the potential to harm LGBT youth". The Southern Poverty Law Center (SPLC) designated the FRC as a hate group in its Winter 2010 Intelligence Report. Mother Jones reported that "The Southern Poverty Law Center's classification of FRC as a hate group stems from FRC's more than decade-long insistence that gay people are more likely to molest children. ... Research from non-ideological outfits is actually firm in concluding the opposite."

In 2017, at the council-sponsored Values Voter Summit, a tote bag was distributed to all attendees that included a copy of a flyer entitled "The Health Hazards of Homosexuality" written by MassResistance, which the SPLC has also designated as a hate group.

An amicus brief submitted in relation to United States v. Windsor (which struck down part of the Defense of Marriage Act) argued that DOMA did not discriminate on the basis of sexual orientation, and their amicus brief in Obergefell v. Hodges argued against same-sex marriage. An article written by Travis Weber, the director of the Council's Center for Religious Liberty, was highly critical of both Supreme Court decisions.

=== Same-sex marriage cases ===
The FRC, on January 28, 2013, issued an amicus brief in support of the Proposition 8 and the Defense of Marriage Act cases before the Supreme Court, arguing for the court to uphold DOMA banning federal recognition of same-sex unions and Proposition 8 banning gay marriage in California. On June 26, 2013, the Supreme Court ruled in United States v. Windsor that the Defense of Marriage Act unconstitutionally deprived gay and lesbian couples of liberty, and in Hollingsworth v. Perry that Proposition 8's proponents had no standing to defend the law, leaving in place a lower-court ruling overturning the ban.

=== Project 2025 ===
FRC is a member of the advisory board of Project 2025, a collection of conservative and right-wing policy proposals from the Heritage Foundation to reshape the United States federal government and consolidate executive power should the Republican nominee win the 2024 presidential election.

== Publishing and lobbying activities ==
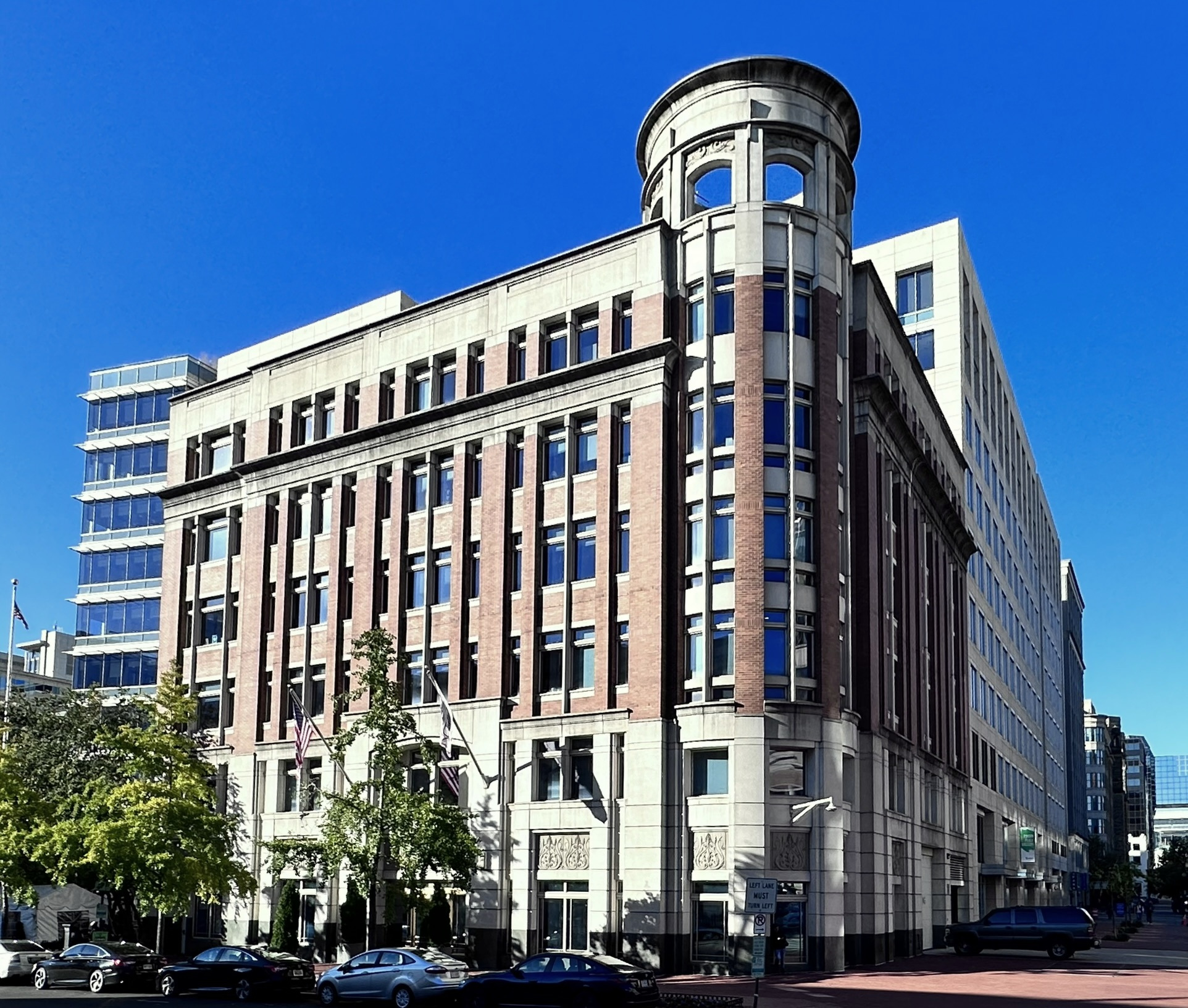
Family Research Council Building in Washington, D.C.

Family Research Council is a member of ProtectMarriage.com, a coalition formed to sponsor California Proposition 8 to restrict marriage to opposite-sex couples only, which passed in 2008 (but was later struck down as unconstitutional by a federal court in California).

The Council publishes The Washington Stand, a periodical of news and commentary from the council's perspective.

=== Justice Sunday ===
Justice Sunday was the name for three religious conferences organized by FRC and Focus on the Family in 2005 and 2006. According to FRC, the purpose of the events was to "request an end to filibusters of judicial nominees that were based, at least in part, on the nominees' religious views or imputed inability to decide cases on the basis of the law regardless of their beliefs."

=== Pray Vote Stand Summit ===
Every fall, FRC Action (the political action group affiliated with FRC) holds an annual summit composed for conservative Christian activists and evangelical voters in Washington, D.C. The summit has been a place for social conservatives across the nation to hear Republican presidential hopefuls' platforms. Since 2007 a straw poll has been taken as a means of providing an early prediction of which candidate will win the endorsement of Christian conservatives.

=== Ugandan Resolution ===
In 2010, FRC paid $25,000 to congressional lobbyists for what they described as "Res.1064 Ugandan Resolution Pro-homosexual promotion" in a lobbying disclosure report. The US House of Representatives resolution condemned the Uganda Anti-Homosexuality Bill, a bill which, among other things, would have imposed either the death penalty or life imprisonment for sexual relations between persons of the same sex.

Following exposure of the lobbying contribution in June 2010, FRC issued a statement denying that they were trying to kill the bill, but rather that they wanted to change the language of the bill "to remove sweeping and inaccurate assertions that homosexual conduct is internationally recognized as a fundamental human right." They further stated, "FRC does not support the Uganda bill, and does not support the death penalty for homosexuality – nor any other penalty which would have the effect of inhibiting compassionate pastoral, psychological, and medical care and treatment for those who experience same-sex attractions or who engage in homosexual conduct". The Ugandan Resolution was revived by Uganda's President Museveni in 2012. On 1 August 2014, however, the Constitutional Court of Uganda ruled the act invalid on procedural grounds.

The FRC used one of Museveni's speeches in an e-mail to its supporters praising Uganda's commitment to Christian faith and "national repentance" around the time that he reintroduced the Anti-Homosexuality Bill. The speech did not refer to homosexuality specifically, but did mention "sexual immorality" among the sins for which Ugandans must repent.

== Controversies and criticism ==
=== 2010 listing as a hate group by SPLC ===
The Southern Poverty Law Center (SPLC) designated FRC as a hate group in the winter 2010 issue of its magazine, Intelligence Report. Aside from statements made earlier in the year by Sprigg and Perkins (see Statements on homosexuality), the SPLC described FRC as a "font of anti-gay propaganda throughout its history".

As evidence, the SPLC cited a 1999 publication by FRC, Homosexual Activists Work to Normalize Sex With Boys, which stated: "one of the primary goals of the homosexual rights movement is to abolish all age of consent laws and to eventually recognize pedophiles as the 'prophets' of a new sexual order." The report said FRC senior research fellows Tim Dailey and Peter Sprigg (2001) had "pushed false accusations linking gay men to pedophilia".

FRC President Tony Perkins called the "hate" designation a political attack on FRC by a "liberal organization". On December 15, 2010, FRC ran an open letter as an advertisement in two Washington, D.C., newspapers disputing the SPLC's action; in a press release, FRC called the allegation "intolerance pure and simple" and said it was dedicated to upholding "Judeo-Christian moral views, including marriage as the union of a man and a woman". In response, SPLC spokesman Mark Potok emphasized the factual evidence upon which the SPLC had taken the step of making the designation.

A shooting incident in the lobby of FRC headquarters in 2012 (see above) prompted further comments on the SPLC's 'hate group' listing. Dana Milbank, columnist for The Washington Post, referred to the incident as "a madman's act" for which the SPLC should not be blamed, but called its classification of FRC as a hate group "reckless" and said that "it's absurd to put the group, as the law center does, in the same category as Aryan Nations, Knights of the Ku Klux Klan, Stormfront and the Westboro Baptist Church." David Sessions, writing for the Daily Beast, noted that FRC's hostile, false depiction of LGBT people invited strong pushback; "the FRC cannot wage an all-out rhetorical war against the 'gay agenda' and then accuse its critics of being too harsh."

Tufts University political science professor Jeffrey Berry described himself as "not comfortable" with the designation: "There's probably some things that have been said by one or two individuals that qualify as hate speech. But overall, it's not seen as a hate group." Journalist Adam Serwer of Mother Jones argued that the description, while subjective, was justified by the "FRC's record of purveying stereotypes, prejudice, and junk science as a justification for public policy that would deny gays and lesbians equal rights and criminalize their conduct."

=== Tax status ===
In 2020, the FRC asked the IRS to consider it as an “association of churches,” and the Internal Revenue Service (IRS) approved that status change. As part of this request, the FRC had to claim that it conducts weddings, baptisms and funerals. The FRC continues to be a nonprofit 501(c)(3) organization, but as a church, it is shielded from public inspection as it no longer must submit an annual Form 990 to the IRS.

=== George Alan Rekers ===
George Rekers was a founding board member in 1983. In May 2010, Rekers employed a male prostitute as a travel companion for a two-week vacation in Europe. Rekers denied any inappropriate conduct and suggestions that he was gay. The male escort told CNN he had given Rekers "sexual massages" while traveling together in Europe. Rekers subsequently resigned from the board of the National Association for Research & Therapy of Homosexuality (NARTH).

=== Josh Duggar ===
On June 18, 2013, it was announced that Josh Duggar of the television show 19 Kids and Counting would serve as the executive director of FRC Action, the non-profit and tax-exempt legislative action arm of Family Research Council. FRC President Tony Perkins said at the time that the hiring was aimed to tap into the popularity of Duggar's television show, and that "The big part of Josh's focus is going to be building our grass-roots across the country." Published reports listed Duggar as a lobbyist for the group.

Duggar resigned on May 21, 2015, when a scandal involving his past molestation of five underage girls – including some of his sisters – became public knowledge. In reference to Duggar's resignation, Perkins said "Josh believes that the situation will make it difficult for him to be effective in his current work."

== List of presidents ==
- Gerald P. Regier (1984–1988)
- Gary Bauer (1988–1999)
- Kenneth L. Connor (2000–2003)
- Tony Perkins (2003–present)

== See also ==
- Christian Coalition of America – Religious non-profit organization
- Christian right – Socially conservative Christian political ideology
- Christian Voice – American political advocacy group
- LGBT rights opposition
- Moral Majority – American right-wing Christian political organization
- Project Esther – American conservative project against pro-Palestinian protests and alleged antisemitism

== Notes ==
^a The terms "deviate" and "deviant" sex were used historically in laws such as the one struck down by Lawrence v. Texas.
