= Armand Nicholi =

American psychiatrist and professor

Armand M. Nicholi Jr. (October 18, 1927 – June 22, 2017) was a clinical professor of psychiatry at Harvard Medical School and the Massachusetts General Hospital. His clinical work and research focused on the impact of absent parents on the emotional development of children and young adults. He was the editor and coauthor of the classic The Harvard Guide to Psychiatry (3rd edition, 1999). He was also a founding board member of the Family Research Council.

== Biography ==
Nicholi was born in Johnson City, New York on October 18, 1927, to Armand and Mary (née Nitto) Nicholi. He had an older sister Constance and younger sister Maryann. He graduated from Cornell University and New York Medical College. He intended a career in neurosurgery so he began his internship at Cornell Surgical Division at Bellevue Hospital. After a year, he switched to psychiatry. He taught a course on Sigmund Freud and C. S. Lewis at Harvard College and the Harvard Medical School for more than 35 years. For 15 years he served as the psychiatrist for the New England Patriots NFL (football) team. He also had an active practice and served as a consultant to government groups, corporations, and professional athletes. He was married, with two children, and lived in Concord, Massachusetts until his death on June 22, 2017, at his home in Concord, Massachusetts, aged 89.

== Bibliography ==
- The Question of God: C.S. Lewis and Sigmund Freud Debate God, Love, Sex, and the Meaning of Life (2002). Free Press, New York: Simon & Schuster; ISBN 0-7432-0237-6.
- The Question of God. PBS TV series.
