= Kentucky's 32nd House of Representatives district =

American legislative district

Kentucky's 32nd State House of Representatives district
Representative
Tina Bojanowski; D–Louisville
since January 1, 2019
- Registration: 51.7% Democratic; 34.5% Republican; 13.1% No party preference
- Demographics: 70.6% White; 12.8% Black; 6.5% Hispanic; 4.5% Asian; 0.1% Native American; 0.2% Other; 5.4% Multiracial
- Population (2024): 46,564
- Registered voters (2026): 37,975

Kentucky's 32nd House of Representatives district is one of 100 districts in the Kentucky House of Representatives. It comprises part of Jefferson County. It has been represented by Tina Bojanowski (D–Louisville) since 2019. As of 2024, the district had a population of 46,564.

== Voter registration ==
On January 1, 2026, the district had 37,975 registered voters, who were registered with the following parties.

Party	Registration	
Party	Voters	%
Democratic	19,643	51.73
Republican	13,104	34.51
Independent	2,637	6.94
Libertarian	199	0.52
Green	29	0.08
Constitution	17	0.04
Socialist Workers	8	0.02
Reform	6	0.02
"Other"	2,332	6.14
Total	37,975	100.00

== List of members representing the district ==
Member	Party	Years	Electoral history	District location
Fred Cowan (Louisville)	Democratic	January 1, 1982 – November 1987	Elected in 1981. Reelected in 1984. Reelected in 1986. Resigned after being elected Attorney General of Kentucky.	1974–1985; Jefferson County (part).
Fred Cowan (Louisville)	Democratic	January 1, 1982 – November 1987	Elected in 1981. Reelected in 1984. Reelected in 1986. Resigned after being elected Attorney General of Kentucky.	1985–1993; Jefferson County (part).
Anne Northup (Louisville)	Republican	November 1987 – January 1, 1997	Elected to finish Cowan's term. Reelected in 1988. Reelected in 1990. Reelected in 1992. Reelected in 1994. Retired to run for Kentucky's; 3rd congressional district.	1985–1993; Jefferson County (part).
Anne Northup (Louisville)	Republican	November 1987 – January 1, 1997	Elected to finish Cowan's term. Reelected in 1988. Reelected in 1990. Reelected in 1992. Reelected in 1994. Retired to run for Kentucky's; 3rd congressional district.	1993–1997; Jefferson County (part).
Susan Johns (Louisville)	Democratic	January 1, 1997 – January 1, 2001	Elected in 1996. Reelected in 1998. Lost reelection.	1997–2003
Scott Brinkman (Louisville)	Republican	January 1, 2001 – January 1, 2011	Elected in 2000. Reelected in 2002. Reelected in 2004. Reelected in 2006. Reelected in 2008. Retired.	1997–2003
Scott Brinkman (Louisville)	Republican	January 1, 2001 – January 1, 2011	Elected in 2000. Reelected in 2002. Reelected in 2004. Reelected in 2006. Reelected in 2008. Retired.	2003–2015
Julie Raque Adams (Louisville)	Republican	January 1, 2011 – January 1, 2015	Elected in 2010. Reelected in 2012. Retired to run for the Kentucky Senate.	2003–2015
Phil Moffett (Louisville)	Republican	January 1, 2015 – January 1, 2019	Elected in 2014. Reelected in 2016. Lost reelection.	2015–2023
Tina Bojanowski (Louisville)	Democratic	January 1, 2019 – present	Elected in 2018. Reelected in 2020. Reelected in 2022. Reelected in 2024. Reelected in 2026.	2015–2023
Tina Bojanowski (Louisville)	Democratic	January 1, 2019 – present	Elected in 2018. Reelected in 2020. Reelected in 2022. Reelected in 2024. Reelected in 2026.	2023–present
