= David L. Armstrong =

American politician

Dave Armstrong

56th Mayor of Louisville
- In office January 4, 1999 – January 6, 2003
- Preceded by: Jerry Abramson
- Succeeded by: Jerry Abramson

4th Judge/Executive of Jefferson County
- In office January 1, 1990 – January 4, 1999
- Preceded by: Harvey I. Sloane
- Succeeded by: Rebecca Jackson

44th Attorney General of Kentucky
- In office January 2, 1984 – January 4, 1988; Acting: December 13, 1983 – January 2, 1984
- Governor: Martha Layne Collins; Wallace Wilkinson
- Preceded by: Steve Beshear
- Succeeded by: Fred Cowan

Commonwealth's Attorney of the 30th Kentucky Circuit Court
- In office January 5, 1976 – December 12, 1983
- Preceded by: Edwin Schroering
- Succeeded by: Paul Richwalsky

Personal details
- Born: August 6, 1941 Hope, Arkansas, U.S.
- Died: June 15, 2017 (aged 75)
- Party: Democratic
- Education: Hanover College; Murray State University (BA); University of Louisville (JD)

David L. Armstrong (August 6, 1941 – June 15, 2017) was an American politician. He served as the mayor of Louisville, Kentucky from 1999 to 2003. He was the city's last mayor before its merger with Jefferson County to form Louisville Metro.

== Early life and education ==
Armstrong was born in Hope, Arkansas. He was raised in Madison, Indiana. He attended Hanover College, where he became a member of the Sigma Chi fraternity, before graduating from Murray State University in 1966. He earned a J.D. from the University of Louisville school of law in 1969.

== Early career ==
Following graduation Armstrong worked in the public and private sector, including a term as a family court judge and election as Jefferson County's Commonwealth's Attorney, the local felony prosecutor. In 1983 Armstrong was elected Attorney General of Kentucky. He ran unsuccessfully for lieutenant governor in 1987, losing in the Democratic primary to Brereton C. Jones.

== Mayor of Louisville ==
Prior to becoming mayor, he had served as Jefferson County Judge/Executive from 1989 until 1999. The city of Louisville was merged with Jefferson County near the end of his term; Armstrong was a supporter of the ballot measure that brought about the merger.

His term had several successes, most notably his support for the revitalization of Downtown Louisville. Some of the projects he championed were expansions of the medical district, a $111-million Marriott hotel, Fourth Street Live! and Louisville Glassworks. The Louisville Extreme Park, renamed in his honor in 2015, was one of his signature accomplishments as Mayor.

Armstrong's term as mayor was marked by several controversies. Several NBA teams at least considered a move to Louisville during his term, but nothing materialized. Armstrong was criticized for not exploring the possibility of a downtown arena for such a team, although Armstrong rebutted that he shouldn't have been singlehandedly expected to lure a franchise to Louisville. Nevertheless, some, including members of the city's NBA pursuit team, blamed Armstrong for a lack of leadership on the issue.

In 2000, Armstrong fired Police Chief Gene Sherrard, after Sherrard, without the mayor's knowledge, had approved valor awards for two officers involved in a deadly shooting with racial overtones. The officers had been cleared of charges in the fatal shooting of an unarmed black 18-year-old, Desmond Rudolph. The firing won praise from the African American community, but enraged police officers and supporters, leading to a march on Louisville City Hall.

Armstrong did not run to be the first mayor of Metro Louisville, where he would have been a heavy underdog to Jerry Abramson. In early 2007 Armstrong stated that he was considering a campaign for Governor of Kentucky, though he eventually chose not to run.

Armstrong died on June 15, 2017.

Party political offices
Preceded by Steve Beshear	Democratic nominee for Attorney General of Kentucky; 1983	Succeeded by Fred Cowan
Legal offices
Preceded by Steve Beshear	Attorney General of Kentucky; 1984–1988	Succeeded by Frederic J. Cowan
Political offices
Preceded by Jerry Abramson	Mayor of Louisville; 1999–2003	Succeeded by Jerry Abramson
