= Kentucky Attorney General =

Elected official in the U.S. state of Kentucky

Attorney General of Kentucky
- Seal of the attorney general

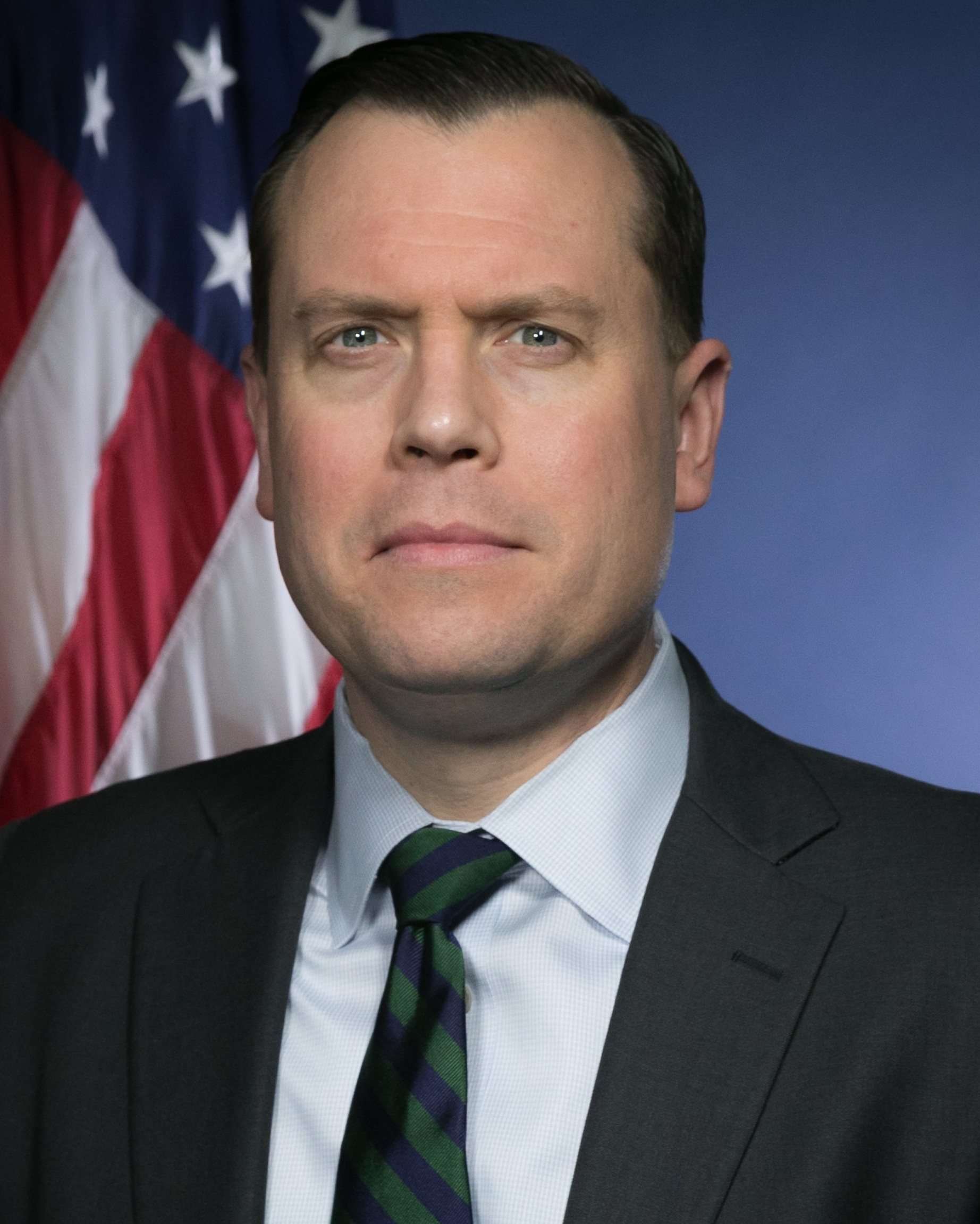
- Incumbent; Russell Coleman since January 1, 2024
- Style: The Honorable
- Term length: Four years, two term limit
- Inaugural holder: George Nicholas; 1792
- Formation: Kentucky Constitution
- Succession: Third
- Salary: $139,724.88
- Website: Office of the Attorney General

The attorney general of Kentucky is the chief legal officer of the U.S. state of Kentucky, created by the Kentucky Constitution (Ky.Const. § 91). Under Kentucky law, they serve several roles, including the state's chief prosecutor (KRS 15.700), the state's chief law enforcement officer (KRS 15.700), and the state's chief law officer (KRS 15.020). As the chief prosecutor, the attorney general is the chairman of the Kentucky Prosecutors Advisory Council, which supervises the prosecutors of Kentucky (KRS 15.700, KRS 15.705). As chief law officer, they write opinions to advise government officials and agencies concerning the law. (KRS 15.020). The attorney general holds an ex officio seat on various Kentucky state boards and agencies.

The attorney general of Kentucky is elected for a four-year term in the same year other statewide officers are elected, rather than being appointed as in some states such as Alaska. A 1992 amendment to the Kentucky Constitution permits the attorney general of Kentucky to serve two consecutive terms. (Ky.Const. § 93). The attorney general appoints a deputy and various assistants to the attorney general, who have the power to act on his behalf. (KRS 15.100(1)). The office of the attorney general is subdivided into five divisions: appellant (overseen by the Kentucky solicitor general), child support services, civil, criminal, and criminal investigations.

The attorney general of Kentucky is currently Republican Russell Coleman.

== List of attorneys general of Kentucky ==
#	Image	Name	Political party	Term
1		George Nicholas	Federalist	1792–1793
2		John Breckinridge	Democratic-Republican	1793–1797
3		James Blair	Democratic-Republican	1797–1820
4		Joseph M. White	Democratic-Republican	1820
5		Ben Hardin	Democratic-Republican	1820–1821
6		Solomon P. Sharp	Democratic-Republican	1821–1825
7		Frederick W. S. Grayson	Jacksonian	1825–1825
8		James W. Denny	Jacksonian	1825–1832
9		Charles Morehead	Whig	1832–1838
10		Owen G. Cotes	Democratic	1838–1849
11		Madison Conyers Johnson	Democratic	1849
12		James Harlan	Whig	1849–1859
13		Andrew J. James	Democratic	1859–1861
14		John M. Harlan	Union	1861–1865
15		John Rodman	Democratic	1865–1875
16		Thomas Edward Moss	Democratic	1875–1879
17		Parker Watkins Hardin	Democratic	1879–1889
18		William J. Hendrick	Democratic	1889–1896
19		William S. Taylor	Republican	1896–1900
20		Robert J. Breckinridge Jr.	Democratic	1900–1902
21		Clifton J. Pratt	Republican	1902–1904
22		N. B. Hays	Democratic	1904–1908
23		James Breathitt	Republican	1908–1912
24		James Garnett	Democratic	1912–1916
25		M. M. Logan	Democratic	1916–1917
26		Charles H. Morris	Democratic	1917–1920
27		Charles I. Dawson	Republican	1920–1923
28		Thomas Burnett McGregor	Democratic	1923–1924
29		Frank E. Daugherty	Democratic	1924–1928
30		James W. Cammack	Democratic	1928–1932
31		Bailey P. Wootton	Democratic	1932–1936
32		B. M. Vincent	Democratic	1936–1937
33		Hubert Meredith	Democratic	1937–1944
34		Eldon S. Dummit	Republican	1944–1948
35		Alvarado E. Funk	Democratic	1948–1952
36		J. D. Buckman, Jr.	Democratic	1952–1956
37		Jo M. Ferguson	Democratic	1956–1960
38		John Bayne Breckinridge	Democratic	1960–1964
39		Robert F. Matthews, Jr.	Democratic	1964–1968
40		John Bayne Breckinridge	Democratic	1968–1972
41		Ed W. Hancock	Democratic	1972–1976
42		Robert F. Stephens	Democratic	1976–1979
Acting		Steve Beshear	Democratic	1979–1980
43		Steve Beshear	Democratic	1980–1984
44		David L. Armstrong	Democratic	1984–1988
45		Fred Cowan	Democratic	1988–1992
46		Chris Gorman	Democratic	1992–1996
47		Ben Chandler	Democratic	1996–2004
48		Greg Stumbo	Democratic	2004–2008
49		Jack Conway	Democratic	2008–2016
50		Andy Beshear	Democratic	2016–2019
Acting		Daniel Cameron	Republican	2019–2020
51		Daniel Cameron	Republican	2020–2024
52		Russell Coleman	Republican	2024–present
