= Jefferson County Judge/Executive =

Chief executive of Jefferson County, Kentucky, USA

The Jefferson County Judge/Executive is the nominal county executive of Jefferson County, Kentucky. Since 2003, when the county government merged with that of its largest city, Louisville, to create the Louisville Metro Government, the former powers of the County Judge/Executive have been assigned to the Mayor of Louisville Metro.

The position of county judge/executive is established in the state constitution. Kentucky Revised Statutes 67.700 further establishes the position of "County Judge/Executive" for all counties in Kentucky. As a result of the city-county consolidation, Jefferson County is the only county in which the office has no governing powers, but it remains an elected office. The holder of the position continues to represent the county in various organizational and lobbying groups, such as the National Association of Counties and the state judge/executive association.

== History ==
Kentucky's Constitutions of 1792 and 1799 did not provide for a county judge. Justices of the peace were the most important local judicial officials during the time these constitutions were in effect. Their duties included responsibility for county administrative matters.

Article IV, section 29, of the Kentucky Constitution of 1850 provided for a county judge. During the time this constitution was in effect the county judge presided over county court, the court of claims, and quarterly court. County court exercised appellate jurisdiction over justices' courts and functioned as the legislative and administrative authority for the county. Courts of claims were an aggregation of all of a county's justices of the peace sitting for the purpose of imposing the county tax levy and appropriating county funds. Quarterly court exercised minor civil jurisdiction.

Under the 1891 Constitution, the office of judge of the county court combined a number of judicial, legislative and administrative duties. Sections 139 and 140 made the county judge the chief judicial officer of the county and quarterly courts. He was also made the presiding officer of the fiscal court, the county legislative body (Section 144). Over the years, additional duties of an executive and administrative nature were assigned to the county judge by the General Assembly.

The 1975 Judicial Amendment to the Constitution, which reorganized the state's judicial system, stripped the office of the county judge of its judicial powers and responsibilities. While the county judge was no longer a judicial officer, the Judicial Amendment (Ky. Const., sec. 124) left other aspects of the office intact. Section 124 says that "[n]othing...shall be construed to limit the powers otherwise granted by this Constitution to the county judge as the chief executive, administrative and fiscal officer of the county..." Also unchanged were numerous statutory powers and duties that have accumulated over the years.

During the 1976 Extraordinary Session, the General Assembly restyled the office of county judge by enacting legislation that strengthened and clarified its administrative and executive powers (KRS 67.710 and 67.715). The title of the office was changed from county judge to county judge/executive, underscoring the altered nature and duties of the position. Additional changes, primarily growth of the judge/executive's responsibilities for financial administration, were made by the General Assembly in 1978 and 1980.

The Jefferson County Judge/Executive formerly had a number of responsibilities unique to the office, by virtue of Louisville being a first-class city. In 2003, the city and county governments merged following a referendum. The new Mayor of Louisville Metro then absorbed all the powers and authority previously held by the county judge/executive, as well as that of the city's mayor. See Kentucky Revised Statutes 67C.105 (1)(4).

Bryan Matthews resigned on July 31, 2014; before the expiration of his term. Governor Steve Beshear appointed Queenie Averette his successor on September 12; Averette was unopposed for a full term in November.

== List ==
	Portrait	Name (Birth–Death)	Term	Party	Election
1		Mitch McConnell (b. 1942)	January 2, 1978 – January 3, 1985	Republican	1977 1981
2		Bremer Ehrler (1914–2013)	January 3, 1985 – January 6, 1986	Democratic	
3		Harvey I. Sloane (b. 1936)	January 6, 1986 – January 1, 1990	Democratic	1985
4		David L. Armstrong (1941–2017)	January 1, 1990 – January 4, 1999	Democratic	1989 1993
5		Rebecca Jackson (b. 1949)	January 4, 1999 – January 6, 2003	Republican	1998
6		Ken Herndon (b. 1957)	January 6, 2003 – January 3, 2011	Democratic	2002 2006
7		Bryan Mathews (b. 1984)	January 3, 2011 – July 31, 2014	Democratic	2010
—	Office vacant July 31 – September 12, 2014				
8		Queenie Averette (b. 1954)	September 12, 2014 – Incumbent	Democratic	2014 2018 2022 2026
