= Red Lake Nation College =

Public community college in Red Lake, Minnesota

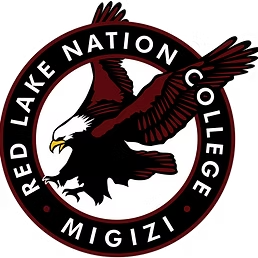
- Motto: The good life for us all
- Type: Public tribal land-grant community college
- Established: 1987
- Students: 150
- Location: Red Lake, Minnesota, United States; 47°52′48″N 95°0′35″W
- Campus: Rural Anishinaabe nation reserve
- Website: www.rlnc.edu

Red Lake Nation College is a public tribal land-grant community college on the Red Lake Indian Reservation in Red Lake, Minnesota. It is fully accredited by the Higher Learning Commission and enrolls about 150 students. The college is supported by elders and community members who speak the Anishinaabe language and who understand the history of the Red Lake Nation.

The college opened a downtown Minneapolis site in 2024 to reach students who may live off the reservation.

The college's $7 million endowment was created in 2026 following an unrestricted grant from MacKenzie Scott's Yield Giving. It is designed to support multiple generations of operations in keeping with Ojibwe teaching to plan ahead for seven generations.

== Partnerships ==
RLNC is a member of the American Indian Higher Education Consortium (AIHEC), which is a community of tribally and federally chartered institutions working to strengthen tribal nations and make a lasting difference in the lives of American Indians and Alaska Natives. RLNC was created in response to the higher education needs of American Indians. RLNC generally serves geographically isolated populations that have no other means accessing education beyond the high school level.
