= Britainy Beshear =

First lady of Kentucky

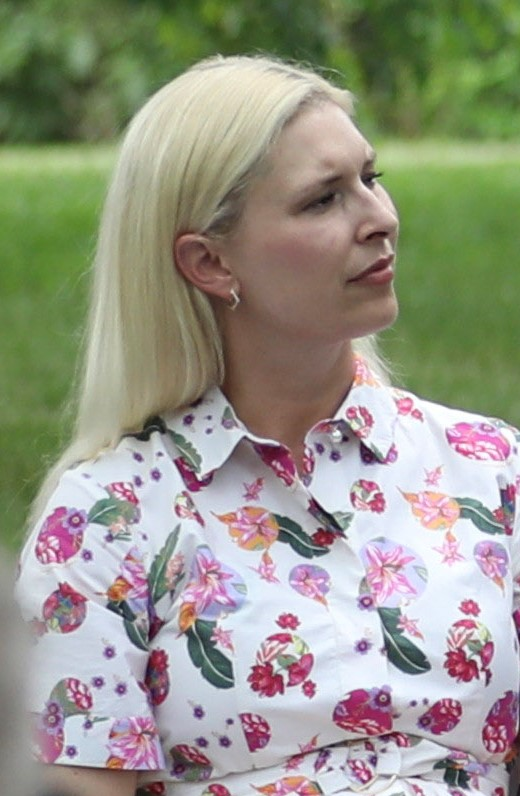
- Beshear in 2023

First Lady of Kentucky
- Current
- Assumed role December 10, 2019
- Governor: Andy Beshear
- Preceded by: Glenna Bevin

Personal details
- Born: Britainy Anne Colman; July 11, 1979 (age 47) Rancho Palos Verdes, California, U.S.
- Spouse: Andy Beshear (m. 2006)
- Children: 2

Britainy Anne Beshear (née Colman; born July 11, 1979) has been serving as the first lady of Kentucky since 2019, as the wife of Governor Andy Beshear. She is known for her advocacy in combatting human trafficking and supporting victims of domestic violence.

== Early life ==
Beshear was born Britainy Colman in Rancho Palos Verdes, California, to Allan and Robin Colman.

She has been a volunteer at her children's school and Family Scholar House. In 2016, Beshear and her husband founded the Hope Gallery art exhibit that features works by youth assisted by Family Scholar House. From 2013 to 2019, she served on the board of directors of Maryhurst, an organization that provides social services.

== First Lady of Kentucky (2019–present) ==
Beshear became first lady of Kentucky on December 10, 2019, when her husband, Andy Beshear, became the 63rd governor of Kentucky. During her first six months as the first lady, she started the Coverings for Kids campaign advocating for face masks during the COVID-19 pandemic. In January 2021, Beshear issued a statement against political divisiveness and called for unity in the state. That year, she started a toy drive which collected over 20,000 toys for families impacted by the 2021 Western Kentucky tornado. She did a drive in 2022 for children impacted by the July–August 2022 United States floods.

In support of victims of domestic violence, Beshear works with the Shop and Share program started by former first lady Jane Beshear. Beshear is a member of the National Coalition for the Prevention of Human Sex Trafficking. Before the 2023 Kentucky Derby, she spoke to raise awareness of human trafficking. On April 21, 2023, Beshear traveled to Fort Knox April 21 for Purple Up Day to honor the month of the military child.

== Personal life ==
Beshear married Andy Beshear on April 1, 2006. They have a son and a daughter. She is a deacon at Beargrass Christian, a Disciples of Christ church in St. Matthews, Kentucky.

== See also ==
- List of current United States first spouses
