= One Goal =

One Goal may refer to:

- OneGoal, an American educational nonprofit organization founded in 2007
- One Goal (film), a 2008 26-minute documentary film directed by the Spanish documentary maker Sergi Agustí
- One Goal, anti-cancer fundraiser Pelotonia, U.S. bicycle ride to raise money for cancer research
- "One Goal", song from Contact!
