= First ladies and gentlemen of Kentucky =

Spouses of the governors of Kentucky, USA

First Lady of Kentucky
- Seal of the Commonwealth of Kentucky

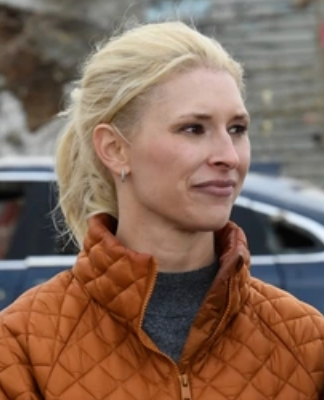
- Current; Britainy Beshear since December 10, 2019
- Residence: Kentucky Governor's Mansion
- Inaugural holder: Susannah Hart (as first lady); Bill Collins (as first gentleman)
- Formation: June 4, 1792

The first lady or first gentleman of Kentucky is the unofficial title of the spouse of the governor of the Commonwealth of Kentucky. In situations where a governor was widowed or unmarried, the duties of the first spouse were undertaken by an official host. The current first lady of Kentucky is Britainy Beshear.

== List of first ladies and gentlemen and official hosts of the Commonwealth of Kentucky ==
First ladies and gentlemen and official hosts of the Commonwealth of Kentucky
Name	Image	Birth - Death	Term	Governor	Ref(s)
Susannah Hart		February 18, 1764 – June 19, 1833	June 4, 1792 – June 1, 1796	Isaac Shelby	
Elizabeth Mountjoy	Elizabeth-Mountjoy-Garrard	May 26, 1751 – August 28, 1832	June 7, 1796 – September 5, 1804	James Garrard	
Mary Catherine 'Caty' Pope		1765 – October 22, 1807	September 5, 1804 – October 22, 1807	Christopher Greenup	
Judith Cary Bell Gist		1750 – June 1833	September 1, 1808 – August 24, 1812	Charles Scott (governor)	
Susannah Hart		February 18, 1764 – June 19, 1833	August 24, 1812 – September 5, 1816	Isaac Shelby	
Elizabeth Thompson Rodes		October 26, 1770 – September 23, 1843	October 14, 1816 – August 29, 1820	Gabriel Slaughter	
Catherine Eleanor Palmer		October 17, 1768 – September 24, 1854	August 29, 1820 – August 24, 1824	John Adair	
Margaret 'Peggy' Bledsoe		July 7, 1773 – May 20, 1849	August 24, 1824 – August 26, 1828	Joseph Desha	
Nancy Mason		December 22, 1788 – June 19, 1852	August 26, 1828 – September 4, 1832	Thomas Metcalfe (Kentucky politician)	
Susan Mildred Harris		January 26, 1800 – April 18, 1833	September 4, 1832 – April 18, 1833	John Breathitt	
Elizabeth Breathitt Harwood		March 11, 1799 – July 26, 1842	April 18, 1833 – February 21, 1834	John Breathitt	
Susan Helm Roberts		1797 – March 14, 1838	February 21, 1834 – August 30, 1836	James T. Morehead (Kentucky politician)	
Judith Campbell Clark Bright		July 25, 1820 – December 24, 1855	August 30, 1836 – August 27, 1839	James Clark (Kentucky politician)	
Margaret Crepps		September 7, 1788 – December 18, 1863	August 27, 1839 – September 2, 1840	Charles A. Wickliffe	
Charlotte Robertson		mid-1790s – October 29, 1879	September 2, 1840 – September 4, 1844	Robert P. Letcher	
Elizabeth Gill		August 1, 1788 – April 17, 1858	September 4, 1844 – September 6, 1848	William Owsley	
Maria Knox Innes Todd		October 4, 1796 – September 8, 1851	September 6, 1848 – July 31, 1850	John J. Crittenden	
Lucinda Barbour Hardin		February 2, 1809 – December 25, 1885	July 31, 1850 – September 2, 1851	John L. Helm	
Mary Ann Drake Metcalfe		August 31, 1831 – May 6, 1900	September 2, 1851 – September 4, 1855	Lazarus Powell	
Margaret Leavy		Between 1804 and 1810 – December 17, 1871	September 4, 1855 – August 30, 1859	Charles S. Morehead	
Anna Nelson Shelby		August 5, 1818 – May 7, 1880	August 30, 1859 – August 18, 1862	Beriah Magoffin	
Emily Jane Robinson Burbridge Downey Busbey		July 14, 1827 – November 17, 1879	August 16, 1862 – September 1, 1863	James Fisher Robinson	
Sarah Lean Travis		October 4, 1819 – March 4, 1872	September 1, 1863 – September 3, 1867	Thomas E. Bramlette	
Lucinda Barbour Hardin		February 2, 1809 – December 25, 1885	September 3, 1867 – September 8, 1867	John L. Helm	
Sibella Winston		January 1823 – September 12, 1904	September 8, 1867 – February 3, 1871	John W. Stevenson	
Mary Maupin Kuykendall		April 22, 1833 – September 3, 1900	February 13, 1871 – August 31, 1875	Preston Leslie	
Sarah Catherine "Kate" Hughes	Sarah Catherine Hughes	April 15, 1844 – October 22, 1908	August 31, 1875 – September 2, 1879	James B. McCreary	
Julia Marie Churchill		September 30, 1833 – December 26, 1922	September 2, 1879 – September 5, 1883	Luke P. Blackburn	
Sarah Rosannah McElroy		April 27, 1834 – July 16, 1915	September 5, 1883 – August 30, 1887	J. Proctor Knott	
Delia Hayes Claiborne		July 27, 1857 – March 3, 1932	August 30, 1887 – September 2, 1891	Simon Bolivar Buckner	
Rebecca Hart Dixon		May 28, 1839 – March 15, 1922	September 2, 1891 – December 10, 1895	John Y. Brown	
Margaret Robertson Duncan		January 1, 1846 – September 8, 1923	December 10, 1895 – December 12, 1899	William O'Connell Bradley	
Sarah "Sallie" Belle Tanner		July 12, 1862 – July 9, 1901	December 12, 1899 – January 13, 1900	William S. Taylor (Kentucky politician)	
Julia Tevis Wickliffe Beckham		July 14, 1835 – August 1, 1913	February 3, 1900 – November 20, 1900	J. C. W. Beckham	
Jean Raphael Fuqua		August 19, 1879 – October 4, 1962	November 21, 1900 – December 10, 1907	J. C. W. Beckham	
Mary Elizabeth Ekin		August 15, 1847 – July 29, 1934	December 10, 1907 – December 12, 1911	Augustus E. Willson	
Harriet Newberry McCreary Gay Harbison		June 23, 1895 – March 22, 1971	December 12, 1911 – December 7, 1915	James B. McCreary	
Susan "Sue" F. Soaper		October 3, 1874 – December 21, 1970	December 7, 1915 – May 19, 1919	Augustus Owsley Stanley	
Mary Janette "Nettie" Pitzer		December 10, 1859 – November 19, 1942	May 19, 1919 – December 9, 1919	James D. Black	
Katherine "Kate" Hail Waddle		November 25, 1878 – September 8, 1957	December 9, 1919 – December 11, 1923	Edwin P. Morrow	
Dora Belle McDavid		March 15, 1875 – April 1, 1970	December 11, 1923 – December 13, 1927	William J. Fields	
Susan "Susie" Rachel Steele		November 18, 1875 – February 6, 1952	December 13, 1927 – December 8, 1931	Flem D. Sampson	
Mary Bryant Nisbet		February 13, 1874 – June 5, 1972	December 8, 1931 – December 10, 1935	Ruby Laffoon	
Mildred Lucille Watkins		November 23, 1899 – January 23, 1995	December 10, 1935 – October 9, 1939	Happy Chandler	
Eunice Lee Nichols		September 19, 1895 – May 14, 1982	October 9, 1939 – December 7, 1943	Keen Johnson	
Ida Lee Mills		December 25, 1897 – November 11, 1978	December 7, 1943 – December 9, 1947	Simeon Willis	
Sara McGoodwin Blue		November 23, 1894 – February 23, 1976	December 9, 1947 – November 27, 1950	Earle Clements	
Helen Dwyer		December 27, 1907 – January 12, 2005	November 27, 1950 – December 13, 1955	Lawrence Wetherby	
Mildred Lucille Watkins		November 23, 1899 – January 23, 1995	December 13, 1955 – December 8, 1959	Happy Chandler	
Mabel Hall		April 8, 1915 – December 22, 1972	December 8, 1959 – December 10, 1963	Bert Combs	
Frances Holleman		September 12, 1926 – July 11, 1985	December 10, 1963 – December 12, 1967	Ned Breathitt	
Beula Cornelius Aspey		February 19, 1914 – June 30, 1995	December 12, 1967 – December 26, 1971	Louie Nunn	
Ruby Jean Neel		March 1, 1924 – October 12, 2025	December 7, 1971 – December 28, 1974	Wendell Ford	
Charlann Harting		September 17, 1932 – September 10, 2014	December 28, 1974 – December 11, 1979	Julian Carroll	
Phyllis George	Phyllis George	June 25, 1949 – May 14, 2020	December 11, 1979 – December 13, 1983	John Y. Brown Jr.	
William Louis Collins		January 8, 1938 – living	December 13, 1983 – December 8, 1987	Martha Layne Collins	
Martha Carol Stafford		August 28, 1941 – May 7, 2014	December 8, 1987 – December 10, 1991	Wallace Wilkinson	
Elizabeth "Libby" Alexander Lloyd		October 2, 1943 – living	December 10, 1991 – December 12, 1995	Brereton C. Jones	
Judi Jane Conway	Judi Conway Patton by Alison Davis Lyne (2003)	November 23, 1940 – living	December 12, 1995 – December 9, 2003	Paul E. Patton	
Glenna Aubin Foster		May 11, 1952 – living	December 9, 2003 – December 11, 2007	Ernie Fletcher	
Mary Jane Klingner	Jane Beshear	December 13, 1946 – living	December 11, 2007 – December 8, 2015	Steve Beshear	
Glenna Young		1965 – living	December 8, 2015 – December 10, 2019	Matt Bevin	
Britainy Colman	Britainy Beshear	July 11, 1979 – living	December 10, 2019 – present	Andy Beshear	
