= Undue Medical Debt =

American charity

Medical Debt Resolution Inc
- Formation: Tax-exempt since May 2016; 10 years ago
- Type: 501(c)(3)
- Headquarters: Long Island City
- Region served: United States
- Revenue: 28,294,801 USD (2023)
- Expenses: 22,656,788 USD (2023)
- Website: unduemedicaldebt.org

Undue Medical Debt, formerly RIP Medical Debt, is a Long Island City–based 501(c)(3) charity focused on the elimination of personal medical debt. Founded in 2014 by former debt collection executives Jerry Ashton and Craig Antico, the charity purchases portfolios of income-qualifying medical debt from debt collectors and healthcare providers, and then relieves the debt. The charity converts every dollar contributed into an average of $100 of purchased medical debt relief. The founders were inspired by medical debt elimination efforts by Occupy Wall Street. As of October 2026, the charity claims to have relieved debts for over 31.6 million people, totaling over $49.6 billion.

== Initial media attention ==
The charity gained attention in 2016 when the TV show Last Week Tonight with John Oliver used them to turn $60,000 into $15 million of debt relief. CBS News Sunday Morning profiled Undue Medical Debt in a long-form journalism piece by correspondent Martha Teichner in the April 16, 2023, episode of the Sunday morning television newsmagazine, in which it was stated that the non-profit charity had already extinguished more than $9.5 billion in medical debt.

== High-profile donations ==
In January 2020, professional basketball player Trae Young of the Atlanta Hawks donated $10,000 to the non-profit to abolish a total of $1,000,000 in medical debt.

In December 2020, philanthropist MacKenzie Scott, who was previously married to Amazon.com founder Jeff Bezos, donated $50 million.

In April 2023, a video of the Trinity Moravian Church of Winston-Salem, North Carolina, burning medical debts went viral after they spent $15,000 to acquire and abolish $3.3 million in medical debt. The congregation collaborated with Undue Medical Debt to relieve this debt.

In April 2023, Cleveland, Ohio, announced plans to use nearly $1.9 million from the city's American Rescue Plan Act funding to abolish over $200 million in medical debt in partnership with Undue Medical Debt.

In May 2023, Cook County, Illinois, abolished over $280 million in medical debt through a county-wide medical debt relief program in partnership with Undue Medical Debt.

In October 2023, Oakland County, Michigan, announced plans to use $2,000,000 from the county's American Rescue Plan Act funding to abolish a total of $200 million in medical debt in partnership with Undue Medical Debt.

In November 2023, Casey McIntyre made national news after announcing her own death from ovarian cancer on social media and encouraging her followers donate to Undue Medical Debt. This widespread coverage led to one of the most successful individual campaigns in the charity's history, with nearly $1.1 million donated to an individual campaign in her honor to abolish around $111 million in medical debt.

In January 2024, New York City announced an investment of $18 million over the span of three years to abolish over $2 billion in medical debt in partnership with Undue Medical Debt.

In July 2025, Pittsburgh, Pennsylvania, abolished more than $58 million in medical debt for over 43,000 Pittsburgh residents in partnership with Undue Medical Debt.

In August 2025, entertainment company Cineverse and its subsidiary Bloody Disgusting announced that they would spend the rest of their marketing budget for the release of their film The Toxic Avenger to relieve at least $5 million in medical debt across the country. They also pledged to relieve $1 million more for each million dollars the film grosses at the box office.

In February 2026, YouTube personality Tom Grossi successfully raised $1 million for Undue Medical Debt during a weeklong YouTube stream. It was his second annual $1 Million for Charity stream.

In 2024, Scott gave the organization a rare third donation of $50 million through Yield Giving, bringing her total support of the organization to $130 million. Her donations were reported to have inspired Evan Spiegel to support the organization in 2026.

== Criticism ==
In April 2024, the National Bureau of Economic Research released a study questioning the effectiveness of Undue Medical Debt's strategy. After randomly selecting some of 213,000 people with medical debt to work with the nonprofit, researchers concluded that debt relief, on average, did not improve the mental health or credit scores of debtors. They also found that those whose bills had been paid were just as likely to forgo medical care as those whose bills were left unpaid.

Allison Sesso, Undue Medical Debt's executive director, claimed the study was at odds with the feedback the organization typically heard from the people they helped. "We're hearing back from people who are thrilled," she said.
