= Traps (novel) =

2013 novel by MacKenzie Scott

Traps is a 2013 neo-noir novel by MacKenzie Scott. It follows the lives of four women in the southwestern U.S. whose lives intersect near Las Vegas. It was published by Knopf in 2013.

== Reception ==
Critics approved of the book's unemotional, detached writing style and the divergent storylines involving Scott's four female protagonists. Mark McGurl of The Paris Review wrote:

"It has something of the structure of the modern thriller à la Dan Brown but without the global conspiracies and evil monks and rigorously indifferent prose. Instead it features a subtle background motif of our relation to dogs, those creatures we care for but who can also occasionally be dangerous."

Vogue's Rebecca Johnson called it "taut but nuanced, a character-driven thriller that is both suspenseful and intelligent." Kirkus Reviews wrote that "Each woman is impressively rendered for such a slim book, and each is at a different level of flinty no-nonsensehood that Bezos implies is essential to avoid the "traps" of the title—mostly men but also just life itself."

Jennifer B. Stidham of Library Journal wrote that "Bezos skillfully interweaves the stories of these four compelling characters, all of whom are facing individual challenges and seeking escape and peace." Katy Waldman of The New Yorker wrote that "Unfortunately, "Traps" contains few of "Luther Albright"'s merits, and most of its flaws. It's fatally sentimental and, at times, improbable, even as it labors for realism."

Publishers Weekly wrote "Bezos has a knack for the slow-build. In her second novel she galvanizes the mundane with a sense of dread, presenting four women trapped by sad circumstances and their own fallibility".
