= One Million Degrees =

American non-profit organization

- Abbreviation: OMD
- Formation: 2006
- Type: Non-profit
- Legal status: 501(c)(3)
- Headquarters: 180 N. Wabash #310, Chicago, Illinois 60601, United States
- Revenue: $ $7,000,000 (2024)
- Expenses: $2,011,079 (2016)
- Volunteers: 650 coaches
- Website: onemilliondegrees.org

One Million Degrees (OMD) is a nonprofit organization based in Chicago, Illinois. OMD aims to support students from low-income backgrounds in the Chicago area to graduate from community college. Additionally, OMD helps students network with professionals and receive mentoring in their chosen career fields. One Million Degrees offers financial, educational, and emotional support throughout the participants' studies.

== History ==
David Scherer, Rose Lizarraga, and the family of Daniel Kerrane founded the Daniel M. Kerrane Foundation in 2002 to assist Chicago-area community college students, and to raise graduation rates in the area. By 2006, the program would evolve into One Million Degrees. The organization aims to provide financial support, mentoring, and access to training for school and work. In 2006, One Million Degrees began with 21 students. By 2014, 500 students had graduated from the program.

In 2013, Paige Ponder became the CEO of One Million Degrees. Ponder formerly worked in Chicago Public Schools and was the leader of the STEM organization Project Exploration. She also worked in The Grow Network and at McGraw-Hill Education.

In 2014, assistant professor at University of Illinois Lorenzo Baber conducted a study where he interviewed alumni of the One Million Degrees program. His goal was to examine whether or not the program had impacted individual's life trajectories. He found that participants felt the organization focused on each of the individuals, their skills, and their goals, and attempted to expand on those. Baber concluded that One Million Degrees' organizational structure is beneficial because it "fosters a commitment to change and development in their participants". In 2015, a study done by a PhD student at Northwestern University examined how OMD could help people transition into adulthood. The study concluded that OMD's focus on capital and personal growth helped achieve this goal with many other graduates.

In 2017, One Million Degrees was nominated in Inside Philanthropy's fifth annual Philanthropy Awards, recognizing the work of non-for-profits.

== Services ==
Some offerings of One Million Degrees include tutoring, one-on-one program coordinator support, coaching, and stipends for things like transportation, childcare and internet access. As of 2017, there were 800 OMD "scholars" from ten community colleges. "Program assistants" at OMD work to help the students finish their degrees. OMD claims that participants are graduating at a rate of 70% and 94% of graduates are working, continuing their education, or both.

One Million Degrees has had multiple fundraising events. Their eighth annual Food and Wine Benefit, in May 2015, had over 450 attendees and over $500,000 was raised to continue providing resources for low income community college students. Their ninth annual benefit event had an attendance of over 490, and raised over $650,000 plus a grant of $1.5 million from the Caerus Foundation.

== Partnerships ==
Working with Chicago Mayor Rahm Emanuel's program "Beyond the Diploma", One Million Degrees provides students with vocational training and certification programs. In conjunction with city businesses, the staff mentor and support adults who are getting an education while working. In recognition of One Million Degrees' work with local community college students, Emanuel accompanied OMD and other recipients of the Chicago Innovation Awards in New York City to ring the closing bell at the NASDAQ stock exchange.

One Million Degrees has been supported by MacKenzie Scott's Yield Giving.
