= Sergi Agustí =

Spanish film director (born 1967)

- Born: 1967 (age 58–59); Barcelona, Spain
- Occupation: Film director
- Website: sergiagusti.com

Sergi Agustí (born 1967) is a Spanish film director who has made a number of documentaries in African countries including Sierra Leone, Ethiopia and Congo.

Sergi Agustí was born in Barcelona in 1967. He worked for many years as a photographer. His documentary work covers social issues, but takes a more optimistic view of Africa than is common with other observers.

Agustí's One Goal tells the story of a group of young amputee war veterans in Sierra Leone who decided to advocate peace and show another way to handle differences. The young men changed their lives for the better and became role models for their communities through their determination to play soccer. The film was a finalist in the LinkTV online film contest in the category of "Overcoming Conflict". It received several awards including the Audience Award at the MIRADAS.DOC festival in Tenerife and the Benicàssim festival, Special Jury Mention at the Festival de Alcala de Henares ALCINE38, and the Grand Prize of Spanish Cinema in the ZINEBI Documentary Film Festival of Bilbao. It won the main award at the 14th International Sport Film Festival of 2011 in Liberec.

Agustí's Free Town (2009) documents the recovery of Sierra Leone after ten years of civil war. The video watches the photographer Pep Bonet, his work and interactions with the people and places of Sierra Leone over a five-year period, showing both the damage caused by the war and the hope of the survivors. It is complemented by Pep Bonet's photo essay, which brings a new viewpoint of the conditions in Sierra Leone through a combination of emotion and reality.

== Filmography ==
Selected films.

Year	Title	Notes
2003	Faith in Chaos	
2004	Back To Life	Documentary
2006	My Image Still completed	Documentary
2006	Muzuzangabo: El Despertador de los Demas	Documentary. Audience Award for Best Documentary and Special Jury Mention at the 8th International Film Festival in Valladolid, April 2008.
2008	One Goal	Documentary. Various awards.
2009	Free Town	Spanish, English and French versions.

== Bibliography ==
- Pep Bonet, Sergi Agustí (2008). One goal: [exposición]. Fonart. p. 135. ISBN 978-8493572617.
