= Andy Beshear =

Governor of Kentucky since 2019

- Beshear in 2026

63rd Governor of Kentucky
- Incumbent
- Assumed office December 10, 2019
- Lieutenant: Jacqueline Coleman
- Preceded by: Matt Bevin

50th Attorney General of Kentucky
- In office January 4, 2016 – December 10, 2019
- Governor: Matt Bevin
- Preceded by: Jack Conway
- Succeeded by: Daniel Cameron

Personal details
- Born: Andrew Graham Beshear; November 29, 1977 (age 48) Lexington, Kentucky, U.S.
- Party: Democratic
- Spouse: Britainy Colman (m. 2006)
- Children: 2
- Parents: Steve Beshear; Jane Beshear
- Education: Vanderbilt University (BA); University of Virginia (JD)
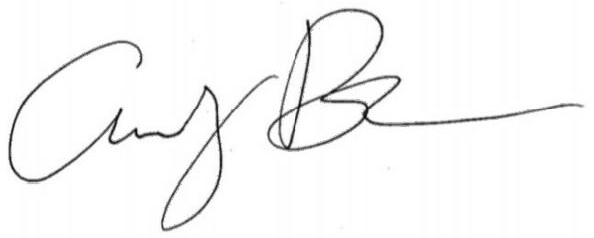
- Signature
- Website: Office website Campaign website
- Beshear's voice Beshear on the response to the 2021 Western Kentucky tornado Recorded December 15, 2021

Andrew Graham Beshear (/bəˈʃɪər/ bə-SHEER; born November 29, 1977) is an American politician and attorney serving since 2019 as the 63rd governor of Kentucky. A member of the Democratic Party, he served from 2016 to 2019 as the 50th attorney general of Kentucky. He is the son of former Kentucky governor Steve Beshear, who served from 2007 to 2015.

As attorney general, Beshear filed multiple lawsuits against Republican governor Matt Bevin over issues such as pension reform. He ran in the 2019 gubernatorial election, defeating Bevin by approximately 0.4%. Beshear was reelected to a second term in 2023, defeating Republican nominee Daniel Cameron by a 5% margin. As of 2026, Beshear and Lieutenant Governor Jacqueline Coleman are the only Democrats in Kentucky holding statewide office.

Beshear has expressed interest in running in the 2028 United States presidential election.

== Early life and education ==
Andrew Graham Beshear was born on November 29, 1977, in Lexington, Kentucky, (Note: Beshear's father, former governor Steve Beshear, has said Andy was born in Lexington. Other sources say he was born in Louisville.) the son of Mary Jane Beshear (née Klingner) and Steven Lynn Beshear. He was raised in Lexington and graduated from Henry Clay High School. His father, an attorney and politician, was the governor of Kentucky from 2007 to 2015.

Beshear is descended from a western Kentucky family. His paternal great-grandfather founded Beshear Funeral Home in Dawson Springs, Kentucky, and the business remains family-run. His great-grandfather and grandfather were also both pastors.

Beshear has said "all his first jobs were around horses". This included mucking horse stalls, giving horseback riding lessons, and working at a summer camp.

After high school, Beshear earned a National Merit Scholarship to Vanderbilt University, where he studied political science and anthropology, earning a bachelor of arts magna cum laude in 2000. He was a member of the Sigma Chi fraternity, and during his senior year served as president of Interhall, Vanderbilt's student government association. He then attended the University of Virginia School of Law, as a Dean's Scholar, graduating with a Juris Doctor in 2003.

== Legal career ==
Beshear began his legal career in the private sector as an associate at White & Case in New York, the same law firm where his father started his law career. Beshear worked at the firm's Washington D.C. office for two years after graduating from UVA Law. In 2005, he was hired by the law firm Stites & Harbison, where his father was a partner. Based in Louisville, he represented the developers of the Bluegrass Pipeline, which would have transported natural gas liquid through Kentucky. The project was controversial; critics voiced environmental concerns and objections to the use of eminent domain for the pipeline. His father's office maintained that there was no conflict of interest with the son's representation. Beshear also represented the Indian company UFlex, which sought $20 million in tax breaks from his father's administration, drawing criticism from ethics watchdogs over a potential conflict of interest. In 2013, while he was working at Stites & Harbison, Lawyer Monthly named Beshear its "Consumer Lawyer of the Year – USA". He was also named a "Rising Star" by Super Lawyers.

In addition to his legal work, he was active in political circles, supporting Democratic candidates and campaigns, including working on those of his father, Steve Beshear, who served as governor of Kentucky from 2007 to 2015.

== Kentucky Attorney General (2016–2019) ==
=== 2015 election ===
Results by county Beshear: 50–60%; 60–70%; Westerfield: 50–60%; 60–70%; 70–80%; 80–90%

In November 2013, Beshear announced his candidacy in the 2015 election for Attorney General of Kentucky, to succeed Democrat Jack Conway, who could not run for reelection, due to term limits. Beshear secured the Democratic nomination without opposition.

Beshear defeated Republican Whitney Westerfield with 50.1% of the vote to Westerfield's 49.9%. a margin of 2,194 votes.

==== Health care and the Affordable Care Act ====
The Affordable Care Act was an issue in the 2015 campaign. The race occurred during ongoing legal and political battles over Kentucky's implementation of the law under Governor Steve Beshear. Beshear supported the expansion of Kentucky health care, while Westerfield said he would "fight against the Affordable Care Act and the federal government".

=== Tenure ===
Beshear's stated priorities as Attorney General were to "prevent child abuse, combat the spread of heroin and get treatment for those suffering, and protect our seniors from scams and abuse."

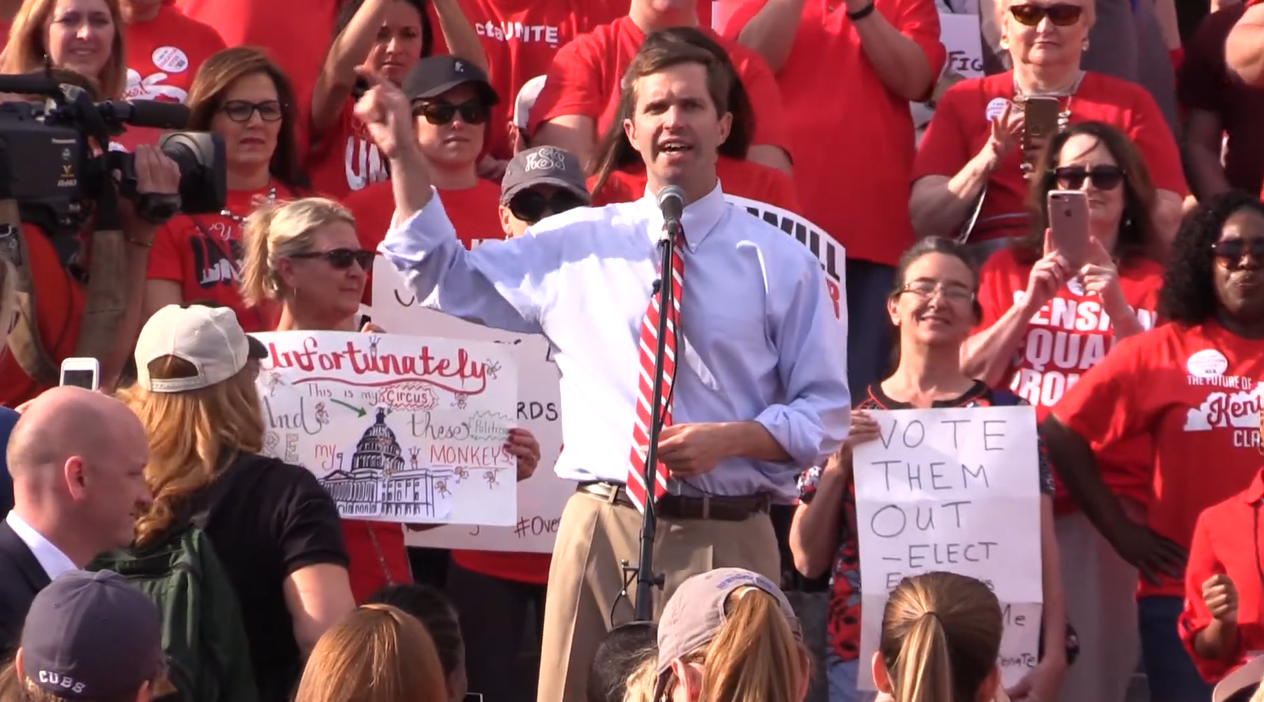
Beshear speaks at a teachers' rally at the Kentucky State Capitol in 2018, which was part of a larger countrywide teacher protest movement.

Beshear declined to run for a second term as attorney general so he could run for governor against Bevin. He resigned as attorney general on December 10, 2019, and was inaugurated as governor the same day. By executive order, Beshear appointed Attorney General-elect Daniel Cameron to serve the remainder of his term. Cameron was Kentucky's first African-American attorney general and unsuccessfully ran for governor against Beshear in 2023.

==== Child abuse prevention ====
As attorney general, Beshear created the Office of Child Abuse and Human Trafficking Prevention and Prosecution and said he had arrested record numbers of child predators.

==== Opioid litigation ====
A major priority during Beshear's tenure was addressing Kentucky's opioid epidemic. He joined multi-state investigations and lawsuits targeting opioid manufacturers and distributors, alleging their role in fueling addiction and overdose deaths.

Beginning in January 2018, Beshear filed nine lawsuits against pharmaceutical companies for their alleged involvement in fueling Kentucky's opioid epidemic.

==== Consumer protection ====
Beshear emphasized consumer protection as a central responsibility of the attorney general's office. His office pursued actions against scams, fraud, and predatory business practices, particularly those affecting seniors. His office also worked to stop price gouging during emergencies and strengthened enforcement of state consumer protection laws.

==== Eliminating Sexual Assault Forensic Evidence (SAFE) kit backlog ====
Beshear made the elimination of Kentucky's Sexual Assault Forensic Evidence (SAFE) kit backlog a priority as attorney general, saying "let there be no doubt—this issue is not about the backlog of kits. It is about justice for victims of rape."

Before Beshear became attorney general, a 2015 audit found more than 4,000 Sexual Assault Forensic Evidence (SAFE) kits were sitting untested in local law enforcement evidence rooms across Kentucky. This backlog represented years of rape survivors waiting for DNA evidence to be processed, often due to lack of funding and standardized testing protocols at the Kentucky State Police crime lab.

During the 2016 Kentucky legislative session, Beshear secured $4.5 million from a settlement with Johnson & Johnson to fund the testing of backlogged kits. He also advocated for and helped implement the SAFE Act of 2016, which mandates that every new SAFE kit be tested within set time frames and that police be trained to conduct victim-centered sexual assault investigations. The law was designed to avoid a recurrence of such backlogs.

Beshear also established a Cold Case Unit within the Attorney General's office. This specialized team of investigators and prosecutors, including a Sexual Assault Kit Initiative (SAKI) coordinator and victim advocate, followed up on "DNA hits" generated by the newly tested kits, identifying serial offenders and solving cold cases.

The initiative resulted in several indictments for decades-old crimes, including serial rape.

==== Open records litigation ====
In 2017, Beshear found the University of Kentucky and Western Kentucky University had illegally withheld faculty and staff sexual misconduct records from their student newspapers. Beshear ruled the schools must allow immediate access to the records, with the exception of names and personal identifiers of complainants and witnesses. Both universities sued to block the release, citing student privacy. The Kentucky Court of Appeals agreed with Beshear and the student newspapers, ruling records were wrongly withheld and the Open Records Act had been violated.

==== Legal disputes with Bevin Administration ====
Beshear sued Governor Matt Bevin several times over what he argued was Bevin's abuse of executive powers during Beshear's tenure as attorney general and while he was campaigning against Bevin for governor. Beshear won some cases and lost others. In April 2016, he sued Bevin over his mid-cycle budget cuts to the state university system. The Kentucky Supreme Court issued a 5–2 ruling agreeing with Beshear that Bevin lacked the authority to make mid-cycle budget cuts without the Kentucky General Assembly's approval. Also in 2016, the Kentucky Supreme Court unanimously sided with Bevin when Beshear sued him on the grounds that Bevin lacked the authority to overhaul the University of Louisville's board of trustees. In 2017, the Kentucky Supreme Court dismissed a lawsuit Beshear brought against Bevin, holding that Bevin had the power to temporarily reshape boards while the legislature is out of session; Bevin called Beshear's lawsuit a "shameful waste of taxpayer resources".

===== Pension and constitutional litigation =====
In April 2018, Beshear sued Bevin for signing Senate Bill 151, a controversial plan to reform all public servants, including teachers and pensions. The Kentucky Supreme Court found the bill unconstitutional. Bevin said Beshear "never sues on behalf of the people of Kentucky. He does it on behalf of his own political career".

== Gubernatorial campaigns ==
=== 2019 ===
Results by county Beshear: 40–50%; 50–60%; 60–70%; Bevin: 40–50%; 50–60%; 60–70%; 70–80%

On July 9, 2018, Beshear declared his candidacy for the Democratic nomination for governor of Kentucky in the 2019 election. He chose Jacqueline Coleman, a nonprofit organization president, assistant principal, and former state house candidate, as his running mate. Beshear said he would make public education a priority. In May 2019, he won the Democratic nomination with 37.9% of the vote in a three-way contest.

Beshear faced incumbent Governor Matt Bevin, the nation's least popular governor, in the November 5 general election. Beshear campaigned on his proposed healthcare and education policies and pledged to enact consumer protections based on the Affordable Care Act and increase public education funding. He defeated Bevin with 49.20% of the vote to Bevin's 48.83%. It was the closest Kentucky gubernatorial election ever by percentage, and the closest race of the 2019 gubernatorial election cycle.

Days later, Bevin had not yet conceded the race, claiming large-scale voting irregularities. Kentucky Secretary of State Alison Lundergan Grimes's office nevertheless declared Beshear the winner. On November 14, Bevin conceded the election after a recanvass was performed at his request that resulted in just a single change, an additional vote for a write-in candidate.

Beshear defeated Bevin largely by winning the state's two most populous counties, Jefferson and Fayette (respectively home to Louisville and Lexington), by an overwhelming margin, taking over 65% of the vote in each. He also narrowly carried the historically heavily Republican suburban counties of Campbell and Kenton in Northern Kentucky, as well as several historically Democratic rural counties in Eastern Kentucky that had swung heavily Republican in recent elections.

=== 2023 ===
Results by county Beshear: 50–60%; 60–70%; 70–80%; Cameron: 50–60%; 60–70%; 70–80%

On October 1, 2021, Beshear declared his candidacy for reelection as governor in the 2023 election. He defeated perennial candidates Peppy Martin and Geoff Young in the Democratic primary election, receiving over 90% of the vote.

On November 7, 2023, Beshear defeated Republican nominee Daniel Cameron 53% to 47% in the 2023 Kentucky gubernatorial election, winning reelection to a second term. Beshear became the third two-consecutive-term governor in Kentucky history.

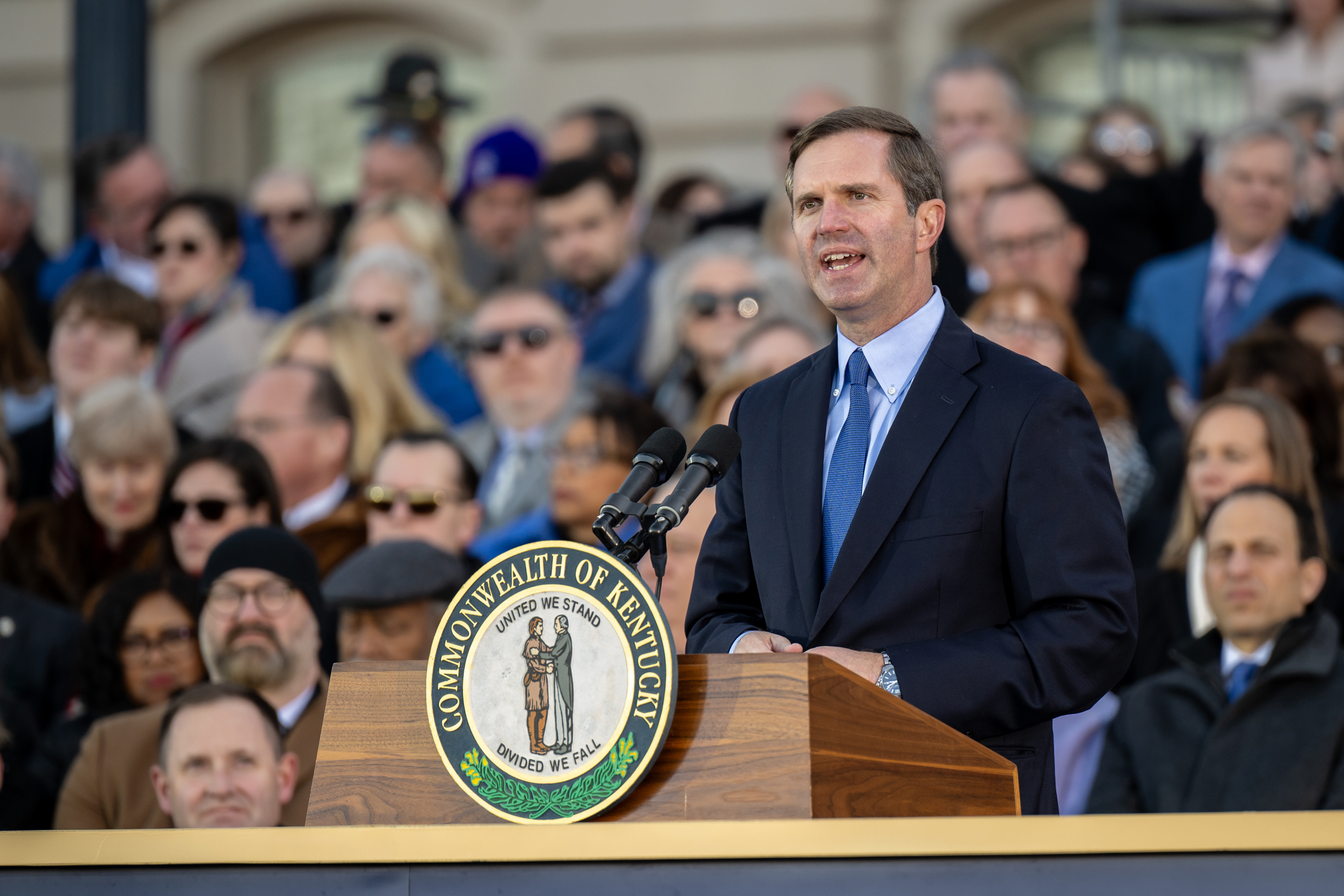
Beshear delivering his second-term inauguration speech, December 2023

Beshear's victory has been attributed to his broad popularity among Democrats and independents, as well as approximately half of Republicans in the state. Compared to 2019, Beshear most improved his performance in suburban precincts; he increased his margins by nearly six percentage points in suburban areas, compared to 4.5 percentage points in urban and rural precincts. In addition, Republican leadership credited a viral ad featuring Hadley Duvall, whose stepfather raped and impregnated her when she was 12, for contributing to Beshear's victory, as they noted that Republicans won the down-ballot races. Kentucky was one of 12 states that had anti-abortion laws that allowed no exceptions for rape or incest, which Cameron initially supported before saying he was open to exceptions.

== Governor of Kentucky (2019–present) ==
=== First term ===
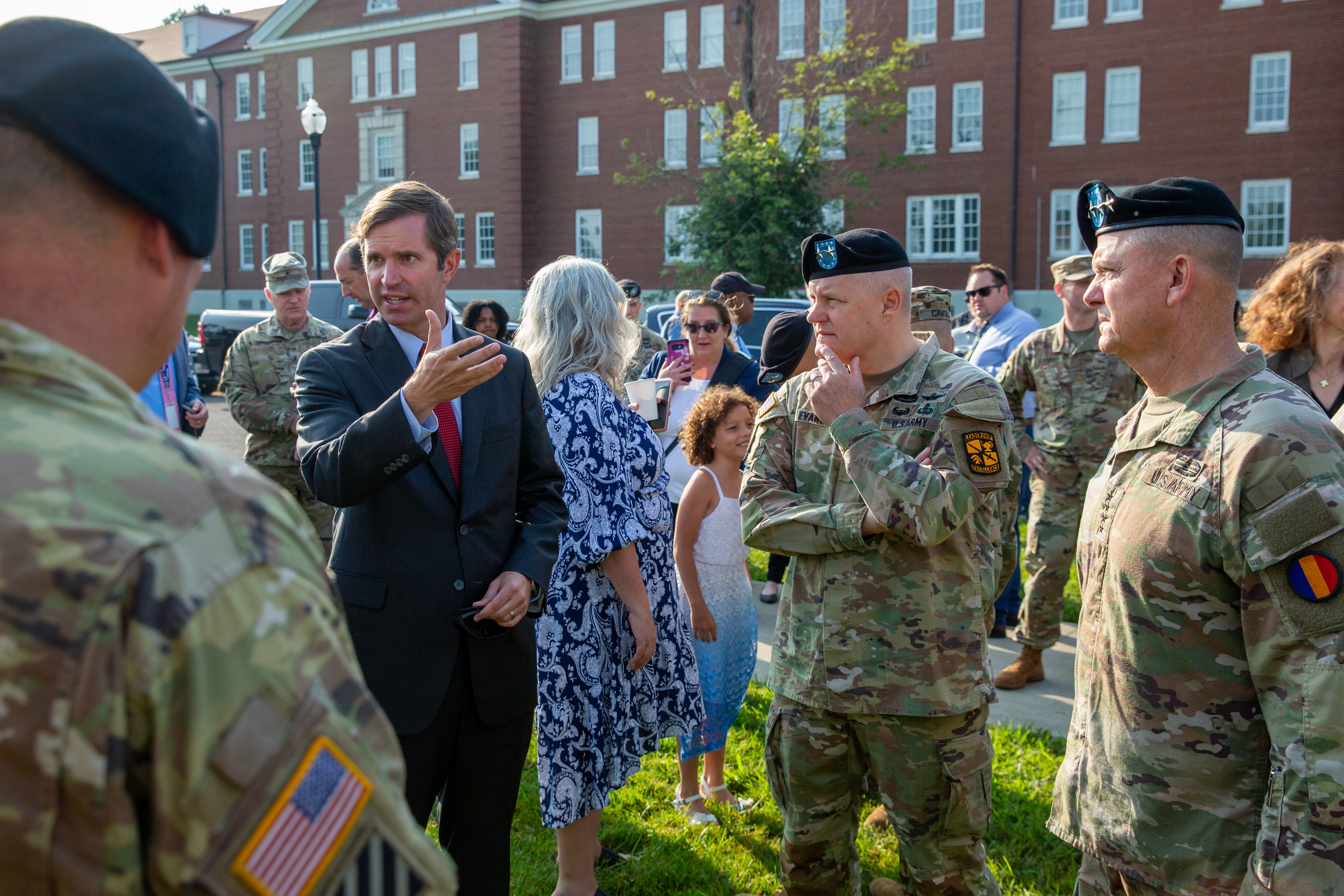
Beshear meets with U.S. Army Cadet Command leadership at Fort Knox in August 2021.

Beshear addresses soldiers and airmen from the Kentucky National Guard in February 2023.

Beshear was inaugurated as governor on December 10, 2019. In his inaugural address, he called on Republicans, who had a supermajority in both houses of the Kentucky General Assembly, to reach across the aisle and solve Kentucky's issues in a bipartisan way.

Upon taking office, Beshear replaced all 11 members of the Kentucky Board of Education before the end of their two-year terms. The firing of the board members fulfilled a campaign pledge and was an unprecedented use of the governor's power to reorganize state boards while the legislature was not in session. Beshear's critics suggested that the appointments undermined the Kentucky Education Reform Act of 1990, which sought to insulate the board from political influence; the Board had increasingly been the focus of political battles in the years preceding 2019.

In December 2019, Beshear canceled planned changes to the state's Medicaid requirements set by his predecessor, maintaining coverage for an estimated 100,000 Kentuckians. On December 12, Beshear signed an executive order restoring voting rights to 180,315 Kentuckians who had been convicted of nonviolent felonies.

In January 2020, Beshear waived testing fees for Kentuckians seeking to earn a GED.

In June 2020, Beshear launched a campaign to enroll African-American residents of Kentucky in Medicaid in an attempt to resolve health care inequities that came to light during the COVID-19 pandemic. Later that month, Beshear removed a statue of Jefferson Davis from the Kentucky Capitol rotunda.

In March 2021, Beshear signed bipartisan legislation providing for three days of no-excuse, early in-person voting, including Saturday, before Election Day. The law also allow counties to establish voting centers where voters can cast ballots regardless of their precinct. On March 22, Beshear signed HB95, bipartisan legislation capping the cost of insulin at $30 per 30-day supply for those with state-regulated health care plans, plans purchased on the marketplace exchange, Kentucky state employees, or people under group plans. The same month, Beshear vetoed all or part of 27 bills the Kentucky legislature had passed. The legislature overrode his vetoes.

In September 2021, the BlueOval SK Battery Park was announced. Beshear called it the "single largest investment in the history" of Kentucky, with the state providing a $250 million loan for the project. The partnership between SK On and the Ford Motor Company was dissolved in December 2025. Ford retained ownership of the site and laid off more than 1,500 workers with plans to repurpose the facility by 2027. Senate president Robert Stivers called the project "the biggest boondoggle of economic recruitment in the state's history."

In May 2022, Beshear expanded Kentucky's Medicaid postpartum coverage from 60 days to 12 months.

In October 2022, Beshear extended Medicaid coverage for dental, hearing, and vision.

In November 2022, Beshear issued an executive order to allow Kentuckians with serious medical conditions to possess medical cannabis lawfully purchased out of state.

On January 4, 2023, Beshear was selected by fellow Appalachian governors to serve as states' co-chair of the Appalachian Regional Commission for 2023, succeeding Maryland governor Larry Hogan. During his tenure as co-chair, the commission put $322 million into financing 701 projects. His father, Steve Beshear, served in the role in 2015. Later that month, Beshear announced Kentucky State Police troopers would be equipped with body-worn cameras in an effort to enhance officer and public safety and increase transparency.

In March 2023, Beshear signed Kentucky Senate Bill 47, legalizing medical cannabis in Kentucky.

=== Second term ===
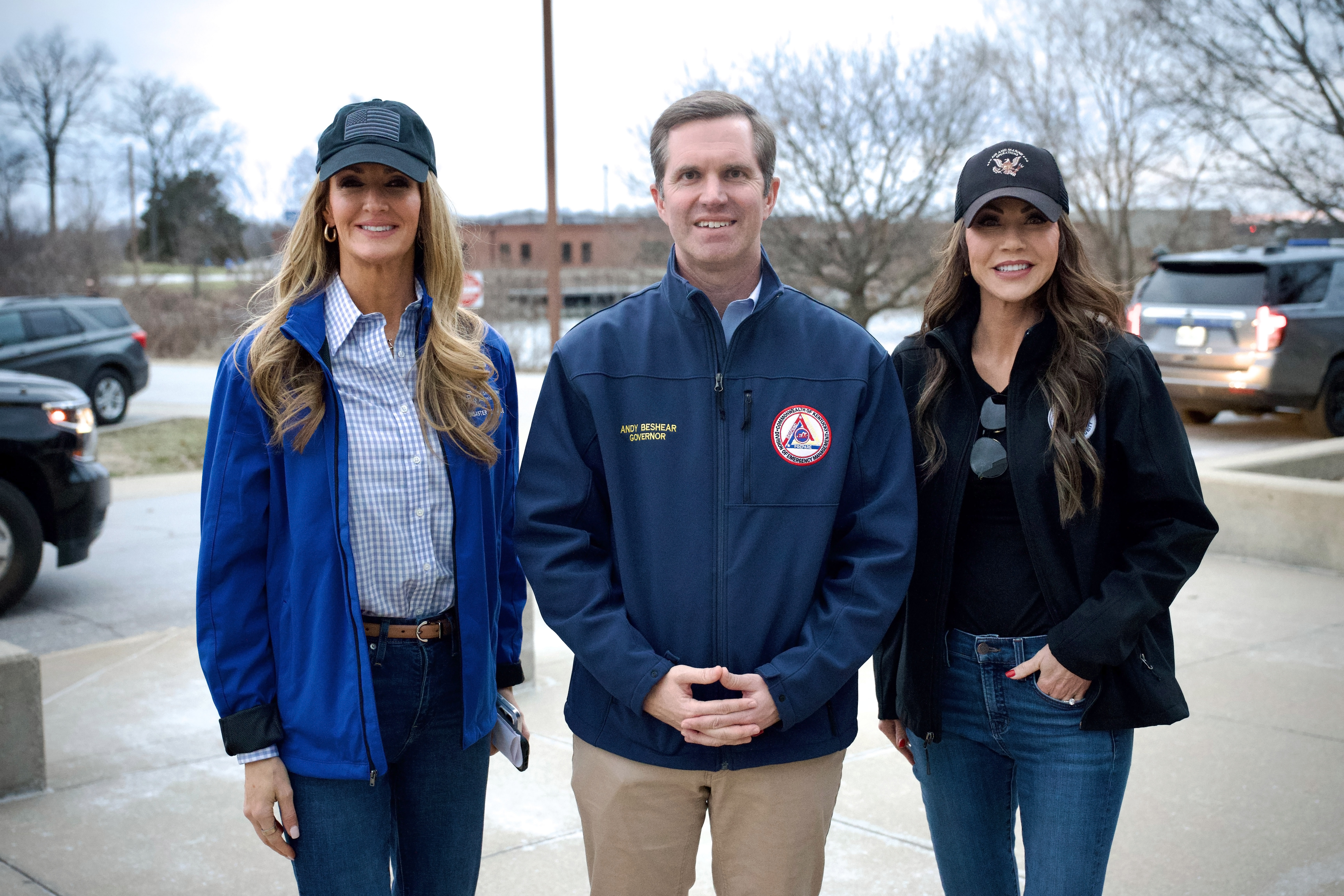
Beshear with DHS Secretary Kristi Noem (right) and Kelly Loeffler (left) in 2025.

In May 2024, Beshear issued an executive order declaring Juneteenth a state holiday and issued an executive order expanding protections in state hiring and employment by banning discrimination based on hairstyles.

In June 2025, at the Muhammad Ali Center in Louisville, Beshear announced a new statewide African-American Heritage Trail that shows how African-Americans contributed to Kentucky and the United States. When adding ten new stops to the trail, Beshear said: "Black history is American history. Black history is Kentucky history, but for much of our history, it has been overlooked and underappreciated. We must honor the incredible contributions that African Americans have made by sharing the stories that otherwise have not been told."

In November 2025, UPS Airlines Flight 2976 from Louisville to Honolulu, an MD-11 with three crew members aboard, was involved in fatal crash just beyond the takeoff runway. Impacts created dangerous conditions, including fumes. Beshear declared a state of emergency and opened a relief fund for those affected.

Polling data released by Morning Consult in March 2026 ranked Beshear as the nation's most popular Democratic governor and the third-most popular governor overall, with 65% of voters approving of his performance in office.

In April 2026, Beshear signed into law HB 5, bipartisan legislation serving as the first step in creating an inmate reentry campus in Kentucky. At the signing, he said: "My faith teaches me the importance of second chances, and I am grateful to know this joint vision between Team Kentucky and KCTCS was supported through bipartisan legislation, which I am proud to sign into law. This first-of-its-kind reentry campus will increase second-chance opportunities, boost public safety and help us fill vital positions across our economy. This work will build on the progress we've made to secure historically low recidivism rates, making Kentucky a national model when it comes to public safety and second chances."

In May, attributing higher gas prices to the 2026 Iran war, Beshear issued an executive order freezing the state gas tax, activated price-gouging laws, and sent two letters to Congress requesting a pause in the federal gas tax. He also declared a state of emergency to temporarily reduce the state's gas tax. Also in May, Beshear issued an executive order launching the Team Kentucky Pre-K Pilot Program to expand free full-day preschool access.

In June, Beshear issued an executive order expanding the list of qualifying conditions for medical cannabis. Fifteen additional conditions were added, including sickle cell disease, ALS, Crohn's disease, Parkinson's disease, and terminal illness.

In July, during U.S. Senator Mitch McConnell's prolonged hospitalization after a fall and absence from the Senate, Beshear sent McConnell's office a letter requesting a detailed public update on McConnell's health. He publicly urged McConnell to provide more than a written statement, suggesting a video appearance or interview to reassure constituents and end speculation. Beshear later revealed that, before McConnell's July 12 health update, he had received calls from agencies indicating that McConnell might have died, underscoring the need for clearer communication.

In August, Beshear skipped the Fancy Farm Picnic, attending his son's baseball game instead. At the event, Senator Rand Paul and Congressman Andy Barr mocked him. Beshear subsequently fired back on Twitter. Later that month, he issued an executive order requiring developers to submit a plan demonstrating their projects will not raise electricity costs for local families and directing the Kentucky Public Service Commission to prevent utilities from passing data center infrastructure costs on to consumers. The order also prohibits data center developments that affect air quality, water quality, wetlands, or other natural resources. Developers must also pay their fair share of state, local, and school taxes, and transparently engage with local communities.

In September, Beshear issued an executive order erasing medical debt for 130,000 Kentuckians. Kentucky partnered with Undue Medical Debt to relieve Kentuckians of $250 million in medical debt.

=== 2024 presidential election ===
In 2024, Beshear created a political action committee to raise money for candidates in the 2024 United States elections who "push back against this national trend of anger politics and division". After Joe Biden withdrew from the race, Beshear was on Kamala Harris's shortlist for vice president. On August 6, Harris chose Tim Walz.

=== Disaster and emergency response ===
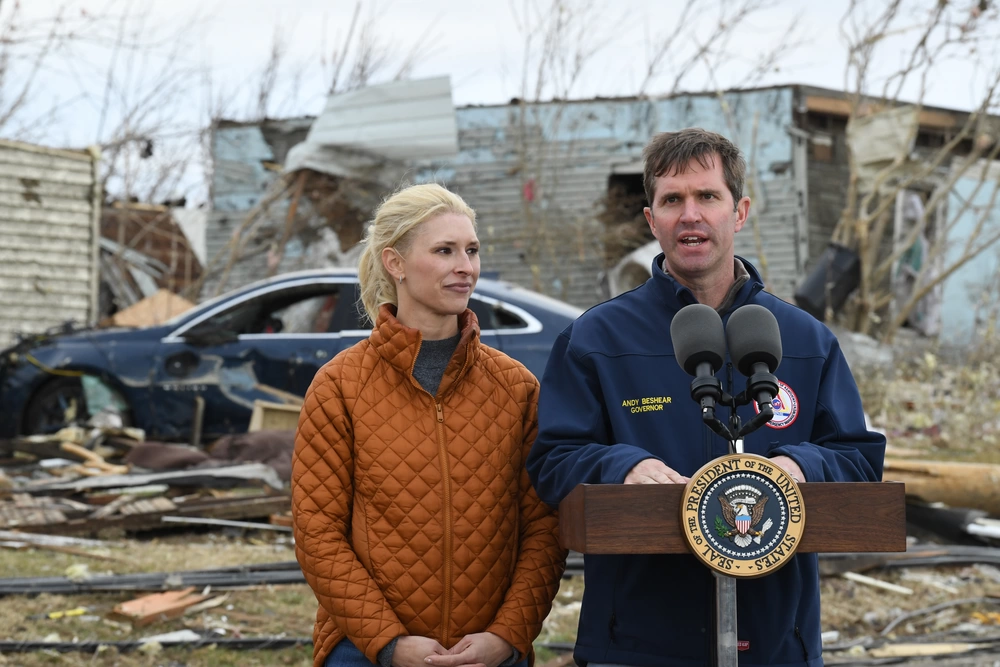
Beshear and his wife Britainy visit Mayfield, which was severely damaged by tornadoes in December 2021.

Beshear's tenure in office has been marked by several natural disasters, 17 of which were federally declared disasters. In December 2021, Beshear led the emergency response to a tornado outbreak in western Kentucky that devastated the town of Mayfield and killed 81 people. In July 2022, torrential rain caused severe flooding across Kentucky's Appalachia region and led to the deaths of over 25 people; Beshear worked with the federal government to coordinate search and rescue missions as President Biden declared a federal disaster to direct relief money to the state.

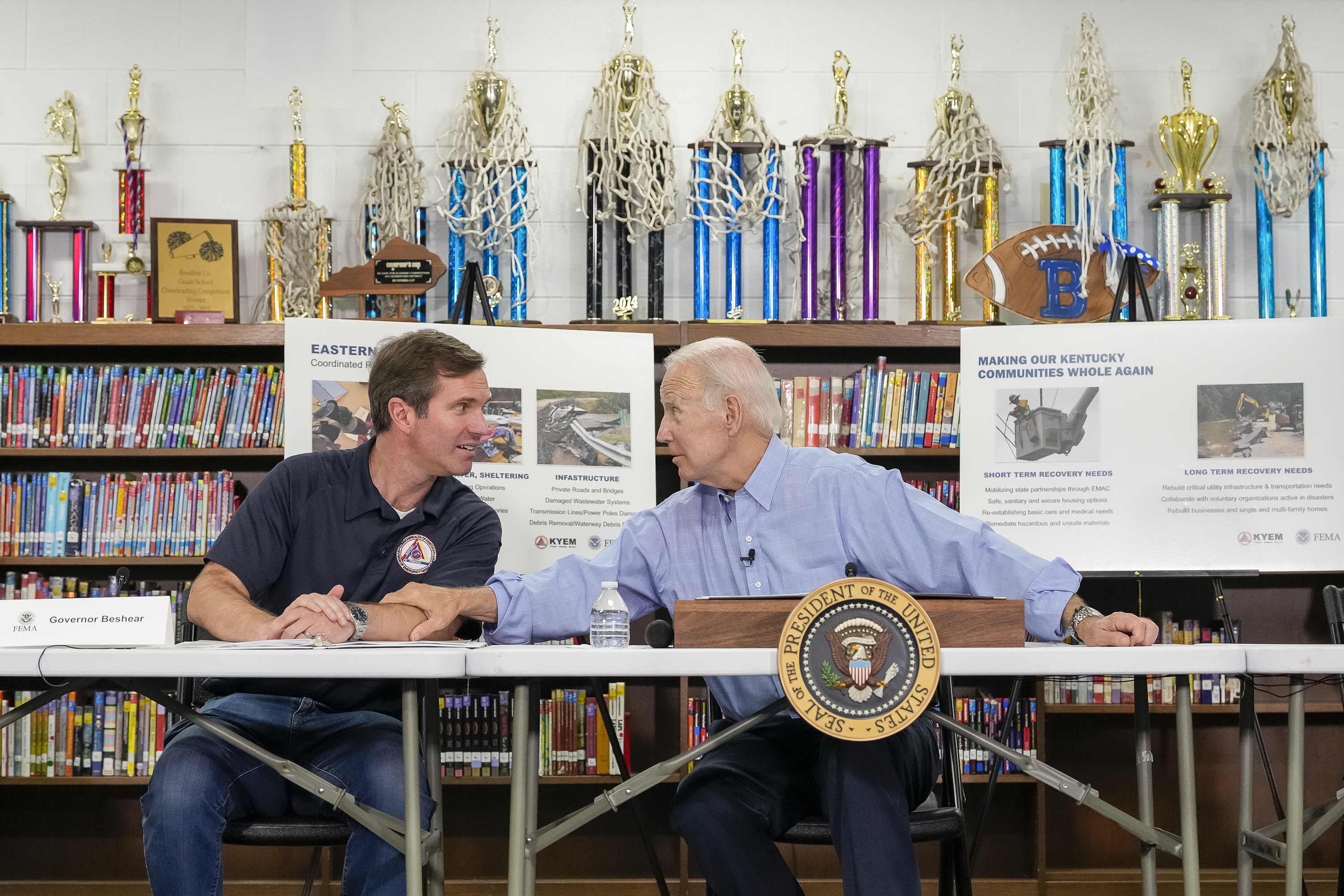
Beshear and President Joe Biden discuss the government response to severe flooding in Kentucky in July 2022.

Beshear has been called "Kentucky's disaster governor" for having dealt "with everything from ice storms to the COVID shutdowns, to the tornado, to eastern Kentucky flooding".

==== COVID-19 pandemic ====
During the COVID-19 pandemic, Beshear oversaw Kentucky's public health response beginning in early 2020. The state confirmed its first case of COVID-19 on March 6, 2020, in Lexington; on the same day, Beshear declared a state of emergency to mobilize government resources and coordinate the response.

After the declaration, Beshear implemented a series of executive orders aimed at slowing the spread of the virus. Soon the administration ordered the closure of bars and in-person dining at restaurants while allowing takeout and delivery services. In March 2020, Beshear recommended Kentucky schools cease in-person instruction until April 20 and the cancellation of large gatherings. Elective medical procedures were suspended to preserve hospital capacity and critical supplies such as personal protective equipment. Beshear also issued an executive order to waive co-pays, deductibles, cost-sharing, and diagnostic testing fees for private insurance and state employees.

A central feature of Beshear's response were his Team Kentucky Updates, daily televised briefings, which began in March 2020 and continued throughout the pandemic. These included updates on case numbers, hospitalizations, and deaths, and public health guidance and personal appeals to Kentuckians. Beshear spoke about mask wearing, social distancing, and later vaccination, while highlighting stories of front-line workers and individuals affected by the virus.

In April 2020, Beshear ordered Kentucky State Police to record the license plate numbers of churchgoers who violated the state's COVID-19 stay-at-home order to attend Easter services. The order led to contentious debate.

In July 2020, Beshear issued an executive order requiring most people to wear masks in public settings where social distancing was not possible, making Kentucky one of several states to adopt a mask mandate. Additional measures included travel advisories, quarantine recommendations for out-of-state visitors, and targeted restrictions on high-risk settings such as long-term care facilities. The administration also expanded testing capacity over time and worked to increase contact tracing efforts in coordination with local health departments.

On November 18, 2020, as the state's COVID-19 cases continued to increase, Beshear ordered Kentucky's public and private schools to halt in-person learning on November 23, with in-person classes to resume in January 2021. This was the first time Beshear ordered, rather than recommended, schools to cease in-person instruction.

Beshear's policies drew both support and opposition. Public health experts and some observers credited early interventions with helping to lessen the initial spread of the virus in Kentucky. At the same time, restrictions prompted protest at the Kentucky State Capitol and legal challenges from individuals, religious organizations, and businesses. Danville Christian Academy, joined by Attorney General Daniel Cameron, sued in the United States District Court for the Eastern District of Kentucky, claiming that Beshear's order violated the First Amendment by prohibiting religious organizations from educating children in accordance with their faith. A group of Republican U.S. senators supported the challenge. The U.S. Court of Appeals for the Sixth Circuit and the U.S. Supreme Court upheld Beshear's order.

==== 2021 western Kentucky tornadoes ====
In December 2021, Beshear led the emergency response to tornadoes that struck western Kentucky. The storms, which occurred on the night of December 10–11, caused widespread destruction across multiple communities, including Mayfield, Dawson Springs, Bremen, and Bowling Green, killing 81 people, making it among the deadliest in the state's history.

Beshear declared a state of emergency and later expanded emergency measures as the scale of disaster became clear. State emergency operations were activated, and the Kentucky National Guard was deployed to assist with search and rescue, debris removal, and security in affected areas.

In the immediate aftermath, Kentucky coordinated large-scale rescue and recovery operations, including efforts to find survivors trapped in collapsed buildings. One of the most heavily hit sites was a Mayfield candle factory, where numerous workers were inside when it was destroyed. Emergency shelters were established for displaced residents, including at Kentucky State Parks. State agencies worked with local officials to restore critical infrastructure, including power and water systems.

Beshear provided frequent public briefings, offering updates on casualties, damage assessments, and ongoing response efforts. His administration created the Team Western Kentucky Relief Fund so people could donate to help those affected by the tornadoes. About 150,000 people donated, for a total of $52 million. Aid included financial assistance, debris removal, and funding for infrastructure repairs.

With funds from the Team Western Kentucky Relief Fund nearly 300 homes have been rebuilt or repaired.

In the months after the tornadoes, the Beshear administration focused on long-term recovery and rebuilding. State and federal programs provided housing assistance, supported local governments, and helped businesses recover. In June 2024, Beshear announced a $223 million investment to building nearly 1,000 affordable rental units in western Kentucky, one of the largest housing development projects in the state's history. The initiative spans 11 projects in Christian, Graves, Hopkins, and Warren Counties.

==== 2022 eastern Kentucky flooding ====
In July 2022, Beshear led the response to catastrophic flooding in eastern Kentucky. The flooding, caused by several days of intense rainfall between July 26 and August 1, caused widespread destruction and dozens of deaths, and displaced thousands of residents, with entire homes and parts of towns swept away by flood waters.

On July 28, Beshear declared a state of emergency, activating the state's emergency operations and authorizing the mobilization of the Kentucky National Guard to assist with rescue and relief efforts. The state coordinated large-scale search-and-rescue operations, including helicopter and boat rescues of residents trapped by rapidly rising water, with hundreds of evacuations conducted in the immediate aftermath.

Beshear provided frequent public briefings, reporting casualty figures and ongoing rescue operations while urging residents to seek safety. He also formally requested federal assistance, and a major disaster declaration was subsequently approved, enabling support from the Federal Emergency Management Agency and other federal agencies. Emergency shelters were established in schools, churches, state parks, and public facilities to house displaced residents.

In the months after the flooding, the Beshear administration worked on recovery and rebuilding. State officials coordinated with federal and local partners to provide financial assistance, restore infrastructure, and address housing shortages. The Team Eastern Kentucky Flood Relief Fund was established so people could donate and help those affected by flooding. Hundreds of millions of dollars in disaster recovery funding went to affected communities.

The long-term response included the creation of "high ground communities". These are neighborhoods built in safer locations, many atop former mountain strip mines, in partnership with state government and local housing nonprofits. Flood survivors were eligible to buy these homes below market rate. Recovery efforts continued for years, with Beshear maintaining a visible role in public updates and reconstruction initiatives.

== Political positions ==
Beshear with Maryland governor Wes Moore in 2024

Beshear has been called a moderate Democrat and also a "liberal" with a "populist streak".

=== 2028 presidential election ===
Beshear has expressed interest in running in the 2028 United States presidential election. He chaired the Democratic Governors Association in 2026. He gave his reasons for running in an interview with Politico, and hired several national-level strategists to guide him through the early stages of his campaign. He urged Democratic voters to prioritize a candidate's electability.

In April 2026, Al Sharpton invited a group of Democrats seen as possible presidential candidates to a convention of the National Action Network. Sharpton said the audience was "taken" with Beshear, and "if there was one that was an eyebrow raise, it was Beshear."

In May, Beshear visited South Carolina and attended Representative Jim Clyburn's annual fish fry. The event has long attracted presidential hopefuls. Clyburn said Beshear gave "one of the most incredible speeches" he had heard.

In August, New York Times political columnist Nicholas Kristof compared Beshear to Bill Clinton.

=== Abortion ===
Beshear supports access to abortion. In 2019, during the Democratic primary for governor, Beshear was endorsed by the abortion rights group NARAL.

One month after Beshear took office as governor, his administration gave Planned Parenthood permission to provide abortions at its Louisville clinic, making it the second facility in Kentucky to offer abortions. In April 2020, Beshear vetoed a bill that would have allowed the state attorney general to suspend abortions during the COVID-19 pandemic and exercise more power regulating clinics that offer abortions. In his veto message, he said, "bills similar to Senate Bill 9 have been struck down as unconstitutional in the majority of states in America when challenged. During this worldwide health pandemic, it is simply not the time for a divisive set of lawsuits that reduce our unity and our focus on defeating the novel coronavirus and restarting our economy." He was endorsed by Reproductive Freedom for All, an abortion-rights group, and is supported by Planned Parenthood.

In 2021, Beshear allowed a born-alive bill to become law without his signature, requiring doctors to provide medical care for any infant born alive, including those born alive due to a failed abortion procedure. In an interview, Beshear said he was not "endorsing the bill" and that "everybody on any side related to Senate Bill 9 agreed that it never happens. And so this being something that never happens and would likely be illegal under other statutes, we ultimately did not sign it but did not feel the need to veto it."

On April 8, 2022, Beshear vetoed HB3, a statewide ban on abortion after 15 weeks with no exceptions for rape or incest. In his veto message, he said: "Rape and incest are violent crimes. Victims of these crimes should have options, not be further scarred through a process that exposes them to more harm from their rapists or that treats them like offenders themselves."

In November 2022, Kentucky voters rejected Amendment 2, a ballot measure that would have added language to the state constitution making abortion restrictions harder to challenge. Beshear voted and campaigned against this ballot measure.

On March 25, 2025, Beshear vetoed HB90, saying in his veto message: "House Bill 90 restricts access to medical care, places barriers on doctors and undermines their clinical judgment, and threatens the lives of pregnant women in Kentucky."

=== Actions taken in response to Trump administration ===
In April 2025, Beshear filed a lawsuit challenging the Trump administration's termination of about $11 billion in federal public health funding. The grants supported vaccination, infectious disease tracking, mental health services, addiction recovery programs, and other public health programs. Kentucky's share included about $148 million in obligated funds. The suit argued the Department of Health and Human Services lacked the legal ground to terminate the grants and that abrupt cancellations threatened public health. In May 2025, a federal judge issued a preliminary injunction preventing the administration from implementing the funding terminations against the plaintiff states. The same month, Beshear filed a lawsuit challenging the Trump administration's attempt to dismantle AmeriCorps. The suit alleged at least $400 million in funds were illegally withheld. The plaintiffs argued the administration could not cancel congressionally appropriated AmeriCorps funding. In August 2025, Beshear announced they won they case. As a result, Serve Kentucky received more than $9 million in federal funds to address issues like housing development, disaster relief, fighting hunger and family support.

In July 2025, Beshear filed a lawsuit to stop the Trump administration from freezing $6.8 billion in federal K-12 education funding. The U.S. Department of Education told states it would withhold funding for before and after school programs, migrant education, and English language learning. Later that month, Beshear filed a lawsuit challenging a U.S. Department of Agriculture demand that states provide extensive personal information about recipients of and applicants for the Supplemental Nutrition Assistance Program (SNAP). The requested information included names, dates of birth, Social Security numbers, addresses, and eligibility-related financial information. Beshear argued that the demand violated privacy protections and could discourage eligible people from participating in SNAP. In September 2025, a federal judge blocked the Agriculture Department from obtaining the requested information.

In March 2026, Beshear filed a lawsuit aimed to stop the Trump administration's proposed tariffs. The lawsuit followed the administration's attempt to impose 15% tariffs worldwide after the Supreme Court ruled in February 2026 that the tariffs were unlawful.

In July 2026, Beshear sued the Federal Emergency Management Agency (FEMA) and the United States Department of Homeland Security. The lawsuit challenges the administration's conditioning of millions of dollars in disaster preparedness and homeland security grants on states accepting and adopting election and immigration policies aligned with the administration.

In August 2026, Beshear filed a lawsuit challenging a Trump administration policy that would allow the sharing of private Temporary Assistance for Needy Families (TANF) recipient data with other agencies to verify recipients' immigration statuses. The suit claimed that the change would illegally expose private information, such as Social Security numbers. Upon joining the suit, Beshear said, "I joined this lawsuit because no Kentuckian—and no American—should have to worry about their confidential and personal information being shared unlawfully. Social Security numbers, addresses and more are private—and we're fighting back against the Trump administration's unlawful actions to ensure they stay that way."

In September 2026, Beshear sent President Trump a letter demanding that he rescind his tariff and trade policies. Beshear said the tariffs are "fueling a cost-of-living crisis" and harming signature Kentucky industries like agriculture, bourbon, coal, and horse racing.

=== Constitutional amendment ===
In 2026, Beshear pushed for a "fix the darn country constitutional amendment" to place term limits on Congress and the Supreme Court, overturn Citizens United v. FEC, abolish the Electoral College, and outlaw partisan gerrymandering. Beshear also supports enshrining the Voting Rights Act of 1965 into the Constitution.

=== COVID-19 ===
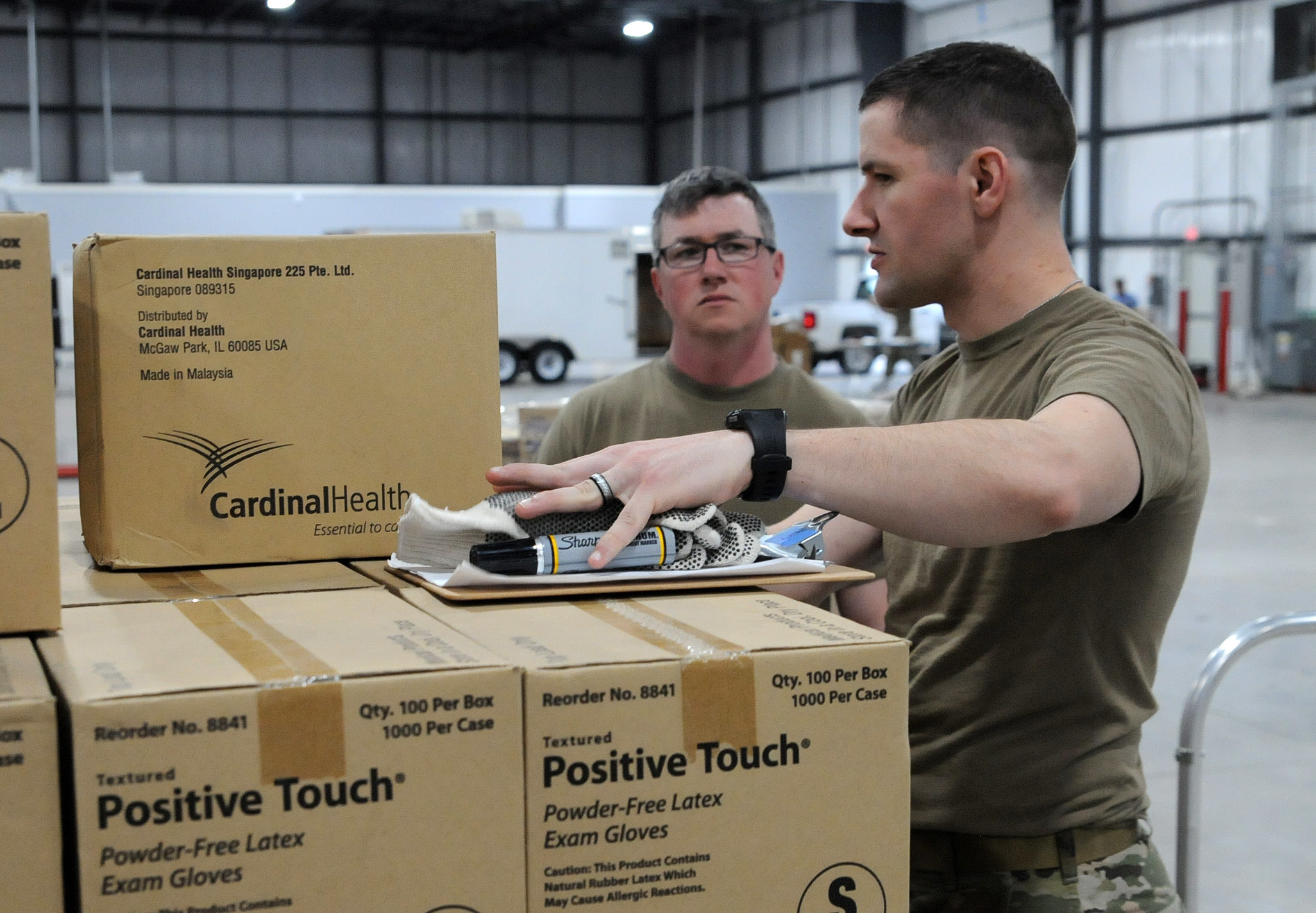
Members of the Kentucky National Guard called up by Beshear provide medical supplies to assist in the COVID-19 pandemic response, March 2020.

On March 25, 2020, Beshear declared a state of emergency over the COVID-19 pandemic. He encouraged business owners to require customers to wear face coverings while indoors. He also banned "mass gatherings" including protests but not normal gatherings at shopping malls and libraries; constitutional law professor Floyd Abrams and lawyer John Langford opined that Beshear's order was inappropriate as it violated public protests' special protected status under the First Amendment.

In August 2020, Beshear signed an executive order releasing inmates from overcrowded prisons and jails in an effort to slow the virus's spread. The Kentucky Department of Information and Technology Services Research and Statistics found that over 48% of the 1,704 inmates released committed a crime within a year of their release and that a third of those were felonies.

Beshear was criticized for not calling the Kentucky General Assembly into a special session (a power only the governor has) in order to work with state representatives to better address their constituents' needs during the pandemic. In November 2020, the Kentucky Supreme Court upheld the constitutionality of Beshear's emergency executive orders. In late November 2020, Beshear imposed new restrictions to further slow the spread of COVID-19, including closing all indoor service for restaurants and bars, restricting in-person learning at schools, limiting occupancy at gyms, and limiting social gatherings. House Speaker David Osborne and Senate President Robert Stivers criticized Beshear for failing to consult the legislature before making his decisions.

Beshear's targeted closures were criticized after it was discovered that state and local authorities were unable to establish contact tracing as it relates to certain types of businesses listed in his restrictions. On June 11, 2021 – one day after the Kentucky Supreme Court heard oral argument on the emergency powers issue – Beshear lifted most of Kentucky's COVID-19 restrictions. In August 2021, amid an upsurge in cases driven by the Delta variant, Beshear mandated that face masks be worn in public schools.

On August 19, 2021, U.S. District Judge William Bertelsman issued a temporary restraining order blocking the school mask mandate. Two days later, the Kentucky Supreme Court ruled against Beshear's challenge of several newly enacted Kentucky laws that, among other things, limit the governor's authority to issue executive orders in times of emergency to 30 days, unless extended by state legislators. The state supreme court dissolved an injunction against the law issued by a Kentucky trial court at Beshear's request. The Supreme Court's opinion, by Justice Lawrence VanMeter, addressed separation of powers between the governor and the General Assembly. The Kentucky Supreme Court found that the challenged laws were valid exercises of the General Assembly's legislative powers, although two justices wrote in a concurring opinion that the 30-day "kill switch" enacted by the legislature should be scrutinized on remand to the lower courts. On August 23, 2021, Beshear rescinded his executive order requiring masks in Kentucky schools.

=== Crime ===
Beshear signed an executive order completely restoring the voting rights, and right to hold public office, of 180,315 Kentuckians who had been convicted of nonviolent felonies. As of 2021, he had restored rights to more felons than any other governor in American history.

In March 2021, Beshear signed a law that allows judges to decide whether to transfer minors 14 and older to adult court if they are charged with a crime involving a firearm. Previously, judges were required to send juveniles to adult court to be prosecuted for a felony if a firearm was involved.

Also in March 2021, after the Kentucky legislature passed a bill to make it a crime to cause $500 or more damage to a rental property, Beshear vetoed the bill. The Kentucky House (74–18) and Senate (28–8) overrode his veto.

In January 2022, Beshear proposed and signed a budget allocating funds to equip Kentucky State Police with body cameras.

Beshear has said he supports the death penalty in some cases, saying, "there are some crimes so terrible and some people so dangerous that I do believe this law needs to continue to be on the books." But despite political pressure, he has refused to authorize any executions as governor, saying, "Kentucky does not currently have, nor can it obtain, the drugs necessary to carry out lethal injection executions."

=== Data centers ===
On August 5, 2026, Beshear issued an executive order establishing strict rules on data center development. It requires developers to submit a plan demonstrating their facilities will not raise electricity costs for local families and directs the Kentucky Public Service Commission to prevent utilities from passing data center infrastructure costs on to consumers. The order also prevents data center developments that affect air quality, water quality, wetlands, or other natural resources. Developers must also pay their fair share of state, local and school taxes, alongside transparent engagement with local communities.

Beshear called for ending all state tax incentives for data centers, saying: "I don't think data centers need incentives. I don't think we should be providing them, and so I would certainly support rolling back any of that."

=== Drugs ===
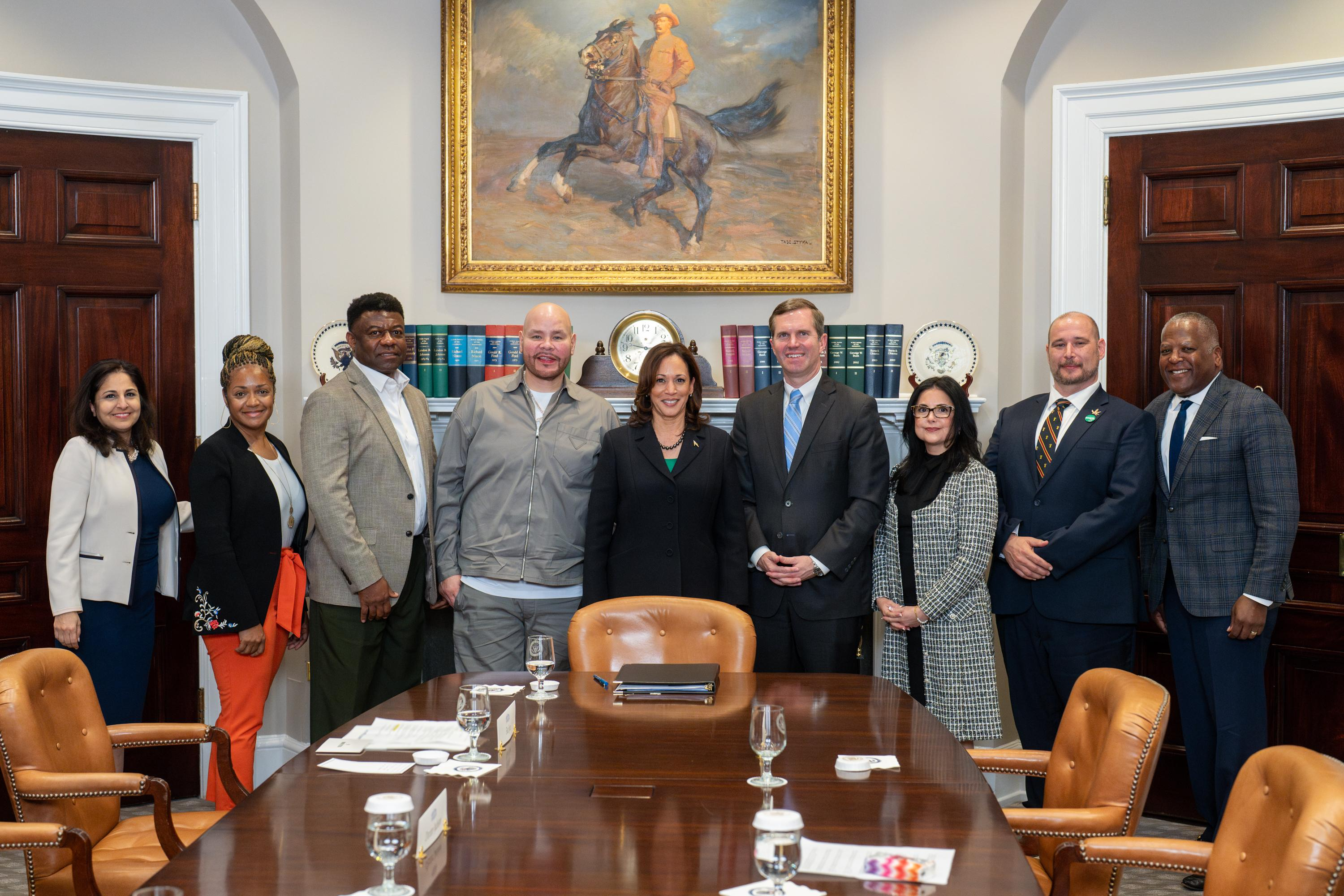
Beshear at the White House to discuss cannabis reform in March 2024

Beshear has said that a significant driver of incarceration in Kentucky is the drug epidemic and that Kentucky "must reduce the overall size of our incarcerated population... We don't have more criminals. We just put more people in our prisons and jails."

==== Cannabis ====
Beshear is of the view that possession of cannabis should never result in incarceration. He supported legalization of medical cannabis. In November 2022, Beshear signed an executive order to allow medical marijuana possession and to regulate delta-8-THC. On March 31, 2023, he signed SB 47, which established a medical cannabis program in Kentucky.

On June 2, 2026, Beshear issued an executive order expanding medical cannabis access, adding 15 new qualifying conditions, including sickle cell disease, Crohn's disease, glaucoma, and ulcerative colitis.

==== Opioids ====
In April 2026, Beshear announced overdose deaths in Kentucky had declined for four consecutive years. This included a 22.9% decrease from 2024 and a 50.8% decrease from 2021, which saw the highest number of overdose deaths ever recorded in Kentucky.

=== Economic policy ===
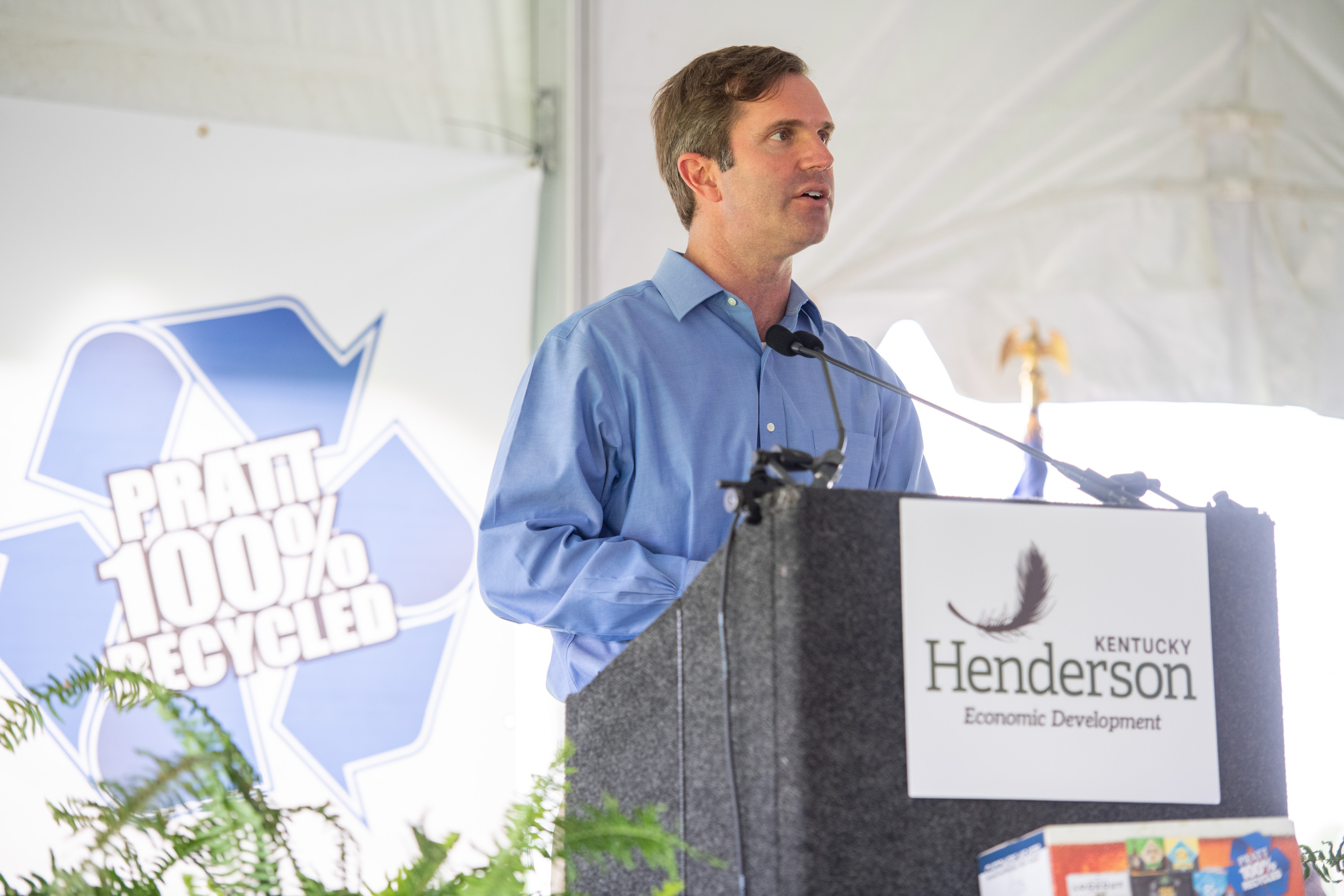
Beshear announces construction of a new paper mill in Henderson, 2021.

Beshear opposes the Kentucky right-to-work law.

In 2019, Beshear pledged to bring more advanced manufacturing jobs and health care jobs to Kentucky, to offset job losses due to the decline of coal and has taken steps to that end.

In June 2021, Beshear signed an executive order to allow college athletes to receive name, image, and likeness compensation. Kentucky was the first state to do so by executive order; six other states had done so by legislation.

In August 2025, Beshear expressed his support for unions in response to an election at BlueOval SK Battery Park. In December 2025, he said Kentucky would "remain the EV battery capital of the U.S." even after layoffs of the Hardin County plant's entire workforce.

=== Education ===
In 2019, Beshear pledged to include a $2,000 pay raise for all Kentucky teachers in his budgets (at what he estimated would be a cost of $84 million). Republican House Majority Floor Leader John Carney rejected the proposal. Beshear has proposed such a pay raise in his budgets, but the Kentucky legislature has not included such raises in the budgets it passed.

Beshear has voiced opposition to charter schools, commenting that "schools run by corporations are not public schools" and that funding them violates the state constitution. The Kentucky Supreme Court agreed, unanimously striking down a charter school funding law.

Beshear has also opposed school choice programs, saying that 2024 Kentucky Amendment 2 meant "less money in public schools" Amendment 2 would have changed the Kentucky constitution to allow state funds to go toward education outside public schools. Beshear campaigned against the amendment and appeared in advertisements. The amendment failed by a wide margin, winning a majority in no county. Beshear said voters had "definitively stated" that public funds should only be spent on public education.

In 2026, Beshear issued an executive order launching the Team Kentucky Pre-K Pilot Program to expand free full-day preschool access. He created the program shortly after Republican leaders in the Kentucky General Assembly decided not to fund preschool in the state budget.

=== Environment ===
Beshear accepts the scientific consensus on climate change. In 2019, he said he wanted to create more clean energy jobs to employ those who lose their jobs in the coal industry and to expand clean coal technology in Kentucky.

=== Gambling ===
Beshear supports legalizing casino gambling, sports betting, fantasy sports betting, and online poker betting in Kentucky. Beshear proclaimed March 2020 Responsible Gambling Awareness Month in Kentucky. On March 31, 2023, Beshear signed House Bill 551 into law, legalizing sports betting in Kentucky.

=== Gun rights ===
Beshear said he would not support an assault weapons ban. He said he would instead support a red flag law authorizing courts to allow police to temporarily confiscate firearms from people a judge deemed a danger to themselves or others. In March 2023, Beshear allowed a bill that would bar state police from enforcing federal gun regulations to become law without his signature.

In April 2026, Beshear issued two firearm-related vetoes during a public event in Louisville. The event was organized alongside advocates affected by the 2023 Louisville bank shooting. Beshear vetoed HB312, legislation that sought to create provisional concealed carry licenses from 18- to 20-year-olds. In his veto message, Beshear noted federal law restricts this age group from buying handguns. He dedicated the veto to his close friend Tommy Elliott, who was murdered in the 2023 bank shooting. Beshear also vetoed a bill that would shield gun manufacturers and licensed dealers from civil liability. In his veto message, he said the bill unfairly prioritized corporate immunity over gun violence victims' rights.

=== Health care ===
Beshear supports Kentucky's Medicaid expansion, which provides affordable health care to over 500,000 Kentuckians, including anyone with a preexisting condition. He criticized Bevin for trying to roll back the state's Medicaid expansion (which ultimately failed). As attorney general and governor, Beshear expressed support for the Affordable Care Act and criticized efforts to strike the law down in the courts. On October 5, 2020, he announced the relaunch and expansion of kynect, the state health insurance marketplace that was started in 2013 during Steve Beshear's term as governor and dismantled by Bevin in 2017.

Beshear also said that he believes healthcare is a "human right".

=== Housing ===
In 2024, Beshear vetoed HB18, saying the bill "allowed discriminatory housing practices." Under the bill, landlords can refuse to rent to tenants who pay with public housing assistance such as Section 8 vouchers. It also stops cities like Louisville and Lexington from enforcing their bans on housing and source of income discrimination. Beshear said: "This bill is just wrong and mean. My hope is that lawmakers will look inside their heart and realize there are those that are less fortunate and they deserve a roof over their heads too. In the end, the same rent is oftentimes being paid; it's just where it's coming from, so why should a landlord be able to say, 'well I'll take cash, but I won't take a voucher of the same value?'"

In July 2026, Beshear issued an executive order directing that $2.5 million be used to build more affordable housing in Eastern Kentucky's High Ground Communities.

=== Immigration ===
In December 2019, Beshear told President Donald Trump's administration that he planned to have Kentucky continue to accept refugees under the U.S. immigration program. Trump had told state governments that they had the power to opt out of the U.S. refugee resettlement program.

Beshear has been critical of U.S. Immigration and Customs Enforcement (ICE), calling them the "worst-trained, most aggressive law enforcement unit I've ever seen" and saying ICE agents had operated outside the law. Beshear said ICE has left a "body count" in the United States and called for a complete pause on all ICE activities, a withdrawal of all ICE agents, and total retraining of personnel. Beshear also said ICE violated constitutional rights by entering homes without warrants.

=== Infrastructure ===
Beshear supports a $2.5-billion project to build a companion bridge to supplement the Brent Spence Bridge that carries Interstates 71 and 75 over the Ohio River between Covington, Kentucky, and Cincinnati, Ohio. He hoped to fund the bridge by conventional means, not tolling, but was unsure whether the state in fact had the funds to do that. In 2021, Kentucky Senator Chris McDaniel, Northern Kentucky's top Republican state lawmaker and chair of the Senate finance and budget committee, said he opposed Beshear's proposal to use the state's rainy day fund or a general fund surplus to help pay for the project.

In late 2022, funding was settled for the Brent Spence Bridge Corridor Project, which will construct a new double-deck companion bridge to carry interstate through traffic while the existing Brent Spence Bridge is reconfigured for local traffic only, through Cincinnati and Covington. About eight miles of improved roadways spanning Kentucky and Ohio will be constructed. The project is estimated to cost $3.6 billion, and received a $1.6 billion federal grant in late 2022. The remaining cost will be evenly split between Ohio and Kentucky. Major construction is expected to begin in 2026. Beshear said there will be no tolls.

In August 2019, Beshear promised to construct the I-69 Ohio River Crossing between Henderson, Kentucky, and Evansville, Indiana, by 2023, saying, "we will build that I-69 bridge in my first term as governor." The project would cost $914 million (plus financing and interest costs). He said he believed the project would provide economic benefits to Western Kentucky.

=== Labor ===
In both 2019 and 2023, Beshear was endorsed by the Kentucky AFL-CIO, United Auto Workers (UAW), and the United Mine Workers of America (UMWA). In 2023, he walked the picket line with striking Ford workers in Louisville. UAW Local 862 was taking part in a nationwide strike against Ford, General Motors, and Stellantis.

=== LGBT rights ===
Beshear supports the legality of same-sex marriage. He also supports anti-discrimination laws that include gay, lesbian, bisexual, and transgender people. He was the first sitting governor of Kentucky to attend a rally staged by the Fairness Campaign, and he supports banning the practice of conversion therapy for LGBTQ youth. In 2024, he signed an executive order to ban conversion therapy for minors after Republicans in the state legislature had repeatedly blocked legislative efforts to do so.

In March 2023, Beshear vetoed a bill creating new regulations and restrictions for transgender youth, including a ban on gender-affirming care; the legislature overrode his veto. Beshear also showed support for a group of drag queens he took a selfie with and defended his actions when criticized by Republicans. During a February 2026 appearance on The View, Beshear said his faith "teaches him that all children are children of God", while defending his veto of a ban on gender-affirming care.

In April 2026, Beshear was the featured speaker at the National LGBTQ+ Victory Fund Brunch in Washington D.C. He also received the organization's national allyship award for "taking difficult stands, vetoing legislation that would cause harm and remaining steadfast in his commitment to fairness and dignity."

=== Pensions ===
Beshear has sought to fund the state's pension system, which has accumulated $24 billion in debt since 2000, the most of any state in the country. He opposed pension cuts made by Bevin, and said he wants to guarantee all workers pensions when they retire. As of June 30, 2020, the Kentucky State Pension Fund was at 58.8% of its obligations for the coming decades.

=== Foreign policy ===
Beshear has met with foreign dignitaries to promote Kentucky as a place to do business and participated in the 2024 World Economic Forum in Davos.

==== Israel-Palestine conflict ====
In July 2025, when asked about President Trump's decision to strike Iran, Beshear said history would be the judge, adding: "We cannot have a nuclear Iran. But was it effective? If you're going to commit this act, it better work." He was optimistic for a possible ceasefire between Israel and Hamas and called Israel "a critical ally" and said "I believe when someone is an ally, when you disagree, you don't do it publicly or through the media." In August 2025, Beshear said he believed that "we always need an Israel that is able to defend itself, both for its and the United States' national security, and also people shouldn't be starving in Gaza". He declined to say whether he would support blocking offensive weapons sales to Israel. In response to an October 2025 ad criticizing his stance on the Gaza war during his visit to New Hampshire, his spokesperson said: "President Trump can and should provide aid to address starvation and suffering in Gaza, and he should do so in a way that does not compromise the safety of the Israeli people."

In March 2026, a spokesperson for Beshear said that AIPAC "has never contributed" to Beshear and never will.

== Public image ==
Beshear has gained increasing national attention during his governorship, particularly as a popular Democratic figure in a Republican-leaning state. He has been frequently mentioned as a potential contender for higher national office, including the 2028 presidential election. Media outlets have noted his efforts to build a national image through media appearances, podcasts, and travel to key early primary states such as Iowa and New Hampshire.

== Other work ==
In April 2025, Beshear began hosting a podcast, The Andy Beshear Podcast, which has featured such guests as Mark Cuban, Maryland Governor Wes Moore, Steve Zahn, Charles Barkley, Gina Hinojosa, former North Carolina Governor Roy Cooper, college basketball coaches Rick Pitino and John Calipari, and U.S. Representative Jim Clyburn.

On July 10, 2025, Beshear played the Doctor in the Lexington Opera House's production of 42nd Street.

In February 2026, Beshear announced he had authored a memoir, Go and Do Likewise, with publication scheduled for September 22. The book focuses on the role of faith in public life and argues for "reclaim[ing] faith as a force for good" in U.S. politics.

== Personal life ==
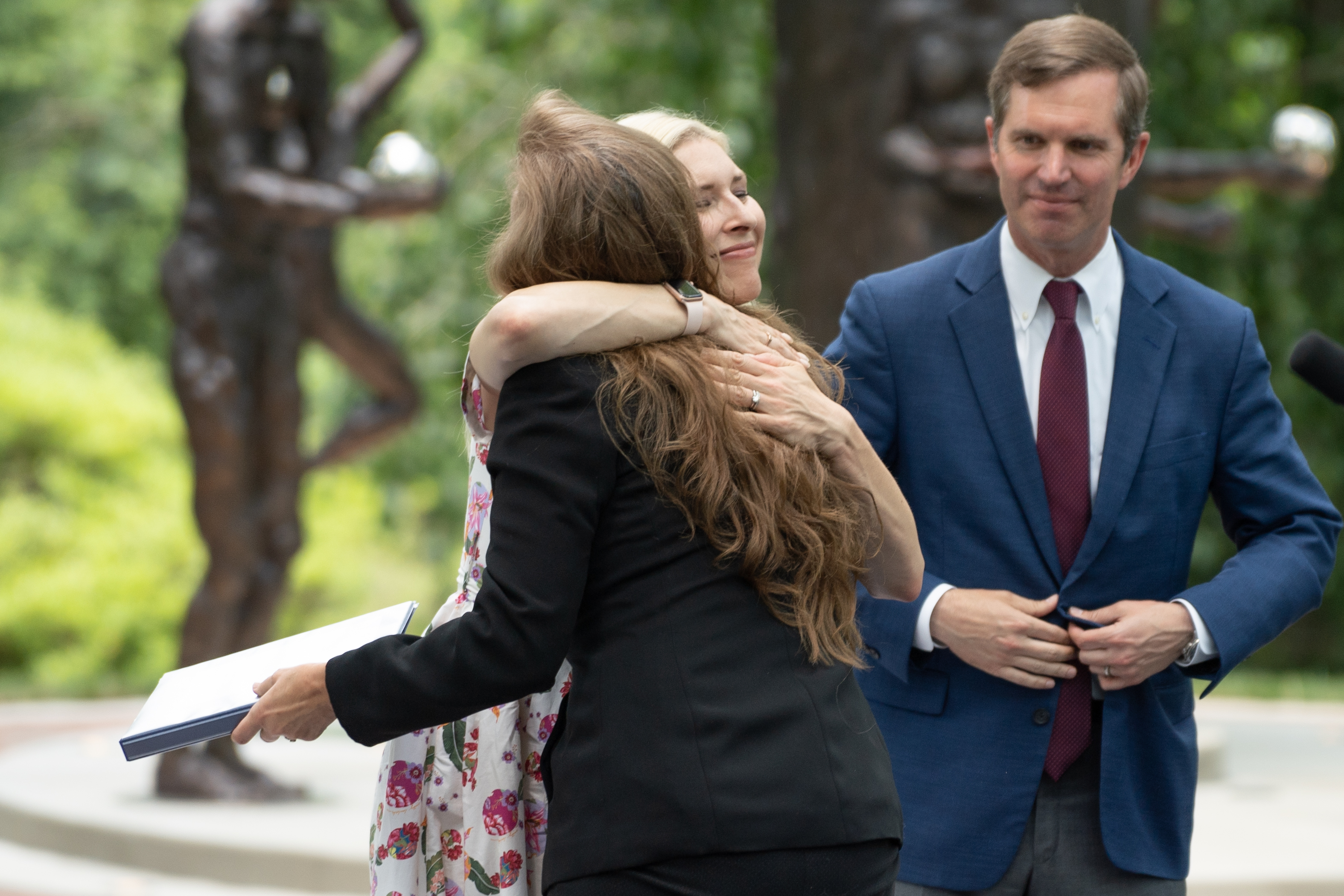
Beshear attends an event with his wife, Britainy Beshear.

Beshear was baptized and raised in the Christian Church (Disciples of Christ).

Beshear and his wife Britainy are deacons of Beargrass Christian Church (Disciples of Christ) in Louisville. Beshear frequently cites his faith as a guiding influence in his personal life and public service. He has said "my why is my faith" and said it motivates his work and daily life. He has also said his faith "teaches that all children are children of God", emphasizing compassion and the Golden Rule in explaining policy decisions.

Beshear has often framed his faith in terms of service to others, saying it "drives me to get up daily and help others", and has cited Biblical teachings about loving one's neighbor as central to his worldview.

Beshear has a poodle named Winnie.

=== Relationships and family ===
Beshear met his wife at a Mexican restaurant while they were both living in Washington D.C. She attended Southern Methodist University, and later had a career as a social worker. First Lady of Kentucky since 2019, she has been active in advocacy for children and families, including efforts to combat human trafficking and support victims of domestic violence. She has worked with organizations such as Family Scholar House. The Beshears have two children.

After Beshear was elected governor, he and his family moved into the Kentucky Governor's Mansion in Frankfort, Kentucky. Beshear's children are the first children to live full-time in the residence since 1995. They attend public school in Frankfort.

Beshear's elder brother, Jeffrey Beshear, is a large animal veterinarian in Virginia.

== Publications ==
=== Articles ===
- "How Democrats can win, everywhere", The Washington Post, November 25, 2019 (co-authored with John Bel Edwards)
- "I'm the Governor of Kentucky. Here's How Democrats Can Win Again", The New York Times, November 12, 2024

=== Books ===
- Go and Do Likewise, St. Martin's Press, September 22, 2026.

== Electoral history ==
2015

Beshear ran unopposed in the 2015 Democratic primary for Kentucky attorney general.

2015 Kentucky Attorney General election
Party	Candidate	Votes	%
Democratic	Andy Beshear	479,929	50.1%
Republican	Whitney Westerfield	477,735	49.9%
Total votes		957,664	100.0%
Democratic hold			

2019

2019 Kentucky gubernatorial Democratic primary
Party	Candidate	Votes	%
Democratic	Andy Beshear	149,438	37.9%
Democratic	Rocky Adkins	125,970	31.9%
Democratic	Adam Edelen	110,159	27.9%
Democratic	Geoff Young	8,923	2.3%
Total votes		394,490	100.0%

2019 Kentucky gubernatorial election
Party	Candidate	Votes	%
Democratic	Andy Beshear	709,577	49.20%
Republican	Matt Bevin (incumbent)	704,388	48.83%
Libertarian	John Hicks	28,425	1.97%
Total votes		1,442,390	100.0%
Democratic gain from Republican			

2023

2023 Kentucky gubernatorial Democratic primary
Party	Candidate	Votes	%
Democratic	Andy Beshear (incumbent)	176,589	91.3%
Democratic	Geoff Young	9,865	5.1%
Democratic	Peppy Martin	6,913	3.6%
Total votes		193,367	100.0%

2023 Kentucky gubernatorial election
Party	Candidate	Votes	%
Democratic	Andy Beshear (incumbent)	694,167	52.5%
Republican	Daniel Cameron	627,086	47.4%
Total votes		1,321,253	100.0%
Democratic hold			

== See also ==
- 2024 Democratic Party vice presidential candidate selection
- Political family

== Notes ==
Party political offices
Preceded by Jack Conway	Democratic nominee for Attorney General of Kentucky; 2015	Succeeded by Greg Stumbo
Preceded by Jack Conway	Democratic nominee for Governor of Kentucky; 2019, 2023	Most recent
Preceded by Laura Kelly	Chair of the Democratic Governors Association; 2025–present	Incumbent
Legal offices
Preceded by Jack Conway	Attorney General of Kentucky; 2016–2019	Succeeded by Daniel Cameron
Political offices
Preceded by Matt Bevin	Governor of Kentucky; 2019–present	Incumbent
U.S. order of precedence (ceremonial)
Preceded by JD Vance as Vice President	Order of precedence of the United States; Within Kentucky	Succeeded by Mayor of city in which event is held
Preceded by JD Vance as Vice President	Order of precedence of the United States; Within Kentucky	Succeeded by Otherwise Mike Johnson as Speaker of the House
Preceded by Phil Scott as Governor of Vermont	Order of precedence of the United States; Outside Kentucky	Succeeded by Bill Lee as Governor of Tennessee
