= The Testing of Luther Albright =

2005 novel by MacKenzie Bezos

- Author: MacKenzie Bezos
- Language: English
- Genre: Novel
- Published: 2005 (Fourth Estate)
- Publication place: United States
- ISBN: 978-0060751425

The Testing of Luther Albright is the debut novel by MacKenzie Bezos, published in 2005 by Fourth Estate, an imprint of HarperCollins.

== Plot ==
Luther Albright is a civil engineer who designs dams in Sacramento, California. He lives with his wife, Liz, and teenage son, Elliott, in a house that he built. Luther is emotionally reserved with no friends, and the novel traces how this alienates him from his wife and child over the course of Elliott's coming of age.

At the beginning of the novel, an earthquake hits Sacramento while Luther and Elliott spend the summer remodelling the attic. Elliott is entering adolescence, and this project marks a symbolic shift in their relationship. Luther notices that he has started to grow facial hair, and gives Elliott the reins to build and install the plumbing for a new bathroom independently. Elliott starts to test Luther's emotional boundaries, beginning with haphazardly operating power tools.

Elliott chooses Luther's father as his subject for a biography he has to write at school. Throughout their projects, Elliott questions Luther about what his own father was like, and Luther routinely evades these questions. Luther interprets this as Elliott challenging him, and the questions continue throughout the novel.

Luther leaves a shaving set by the sink for Elliott, and the next morning, Elliott comes downstairs completely bald. This shocks Luther and Liz, but they don't react. Around this time, Liz expresses that she worries what she and Luther will talk about once Elliott moves out, and that one day she might realize that she "doesn't know that she doesn't know [Luther]". At work, Luther is given a prestigious corner office, with rumors of a promotion. This frustrates Luther's workplace rival, Belsky.

Luther and Liz are woken one night to the sound of a girl from Elliott's high school calling to him from their yard, and Elliott telling her to leave. Liz invites the girl in, and Luther convinces Elliott to come downstairs to talk to her. Luther and Elliott walk in to see the girl giving Liz a bolder, shorter haircut, and the parents leave the teenagers to talk. The girl eventually becomes Elliott's first girlfriend.

At Elliott's request, Luther brings him to work and introduces him to his colleagues. Luther watches as Elliott jokes around with Belsky about his bald head, and Belsky makes a dig about one of Luther's dams getting a routine inspection following the earthquake. Luther and Elliott go for a drink, and Elliott questions Luther about why he doesn't defend himself against Belsky's criticisms. Elliott then spends more and more time at Belsky's house after befriending his children. This bothers Luther, but he doesn't interfere with it.

There is a sewage gas leak in the house, and Luther suspects the cause may be from the renovations Elliott did by himself that summer. He doesn't tell Elliott this at risk of offending him. Around this time, Luther wakes Liz up one night to suggest she enroll in training to become a counselor once Elliott moves out, something she has always wanted to do. Liz is insulted, and clarifies she was worried about them as a couple once Elliott leaves, not herself. She does, however, start volunteering at a crisis center, which results in her spending less and less time at home.

Meanwhile, the media begin to cover Luther's dam's routine inspections. Luther receives a phone call from a journalist, whom he evades. Elliott continues to ask Luther questions about his father, specifically asking if there was ever a time his father scared him. Luther continues to avoid the question, but reflects on a time his father came home with a gun, and his estrangement from his father. Luther's flashbacks interspersed throughout the novel reveal that over time his father's behaviour became shiftier and that he tried to taunt Luther's mother, not only by bringing home a gun but also by pretending he was having an affair.

Elliott visits Luther at work and asks him why he hasn't responded to the increasing media criticism about the dam. When Elliott leaves, the journalist calls again, and Luther impulsively tells the journalist that the department is only doing the inspection in order to get funding because there is little other work to do. The next day, Luther's boss threatens to relocate him to Fresno as punishment, but Luther resigns instead.

Luther notices one day when the Belskys pick Elliott up that they have been teaching him how to drive. He surprises Elliott by buying him his first car. Luther continues to receive promising job offers, and turns all of them down, including one from a former colleague, Nathan, whose firm's projects often require overseas travel. Elliott tells Luther that he knows that Belsky got Luther the job offer with Nathan.

When taking out the trash one night, Luther notices the classifieds section from a newspaper with several part-time jobs circled. When he eventually confronts Liz about it, she admits that she only interviewed with jobs just to see if she still qualified as being useful. Eventually, Luther returns to Nathan to ask if the job is still available. Luther mentions Belsky, but Nathan does not remember who Belsky is, revealing that Elliott had lied about Belsky getting him the job in order to provoke Luther.

The narrative, told from Luther's perspective decades later, reveals that Liz eventually dies of cancer. A couple of nights before her death, Luther tells her she is the most important person he knows.

Then, back in the story's narrative time, Elliott reveals that he found Luther's father's gun, which Luther had been keeping in the house the entire time, but Luther doesn't elaborate. Later that day, Luther discovers that Elliott had been tampering with the pipes to cause the sewage gas leak all along. He confronts Elliott, the angriest he's ever been, and then returns downstairs to fix it. As they grow older, Elliott and his family visit Luther, now a widower, less and less, until they only see him once a year at Thanksgiving.

== Reception ==
The book received a generally positive reception, although reviews also criticized the confusing and uncompelling narrator. The book was widely reviewed, garnering reviews from The New York Times, Publishers Weekly, New Orleans Review, The A.V. Club, Kirkus Reviews, The Independent, and The Seattle Times, among others. The book won a 2006 American Book Award.
