= Jane Beshear =

Former First Lady of Kentucky, U.S.

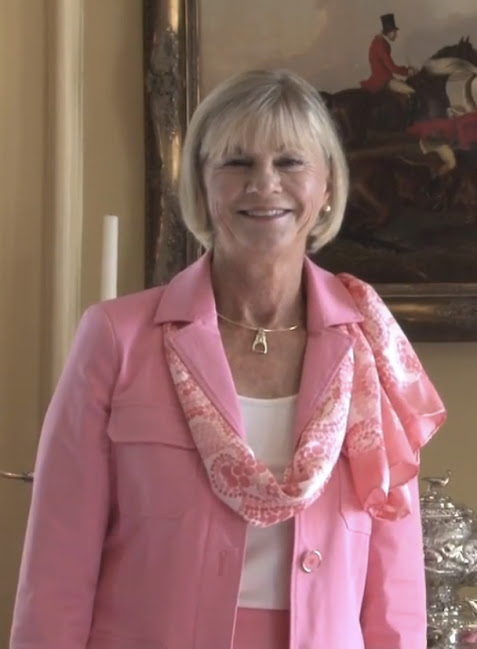
- Beshear in 2011

First Lady of Kentucky
- In role December 11, 2007 – December 8, 2015
- Governor: Steve Beshear
- Preceded by: Glenna Fletcher
- Succeeded by: Glenna Bevin

Second Lady of Kentucky
- In office December 10, 1983 – December 8, 1987
- Lieutenant Governor: Steve Beshear
- Preceded by: Phyllis George
- Succeeded by: Judi Armstrong

Personal details
- Born: Mary Jane Klingner; December 13, 1946 (age 79)
- Spouse: Steve Beshear (m. 1969)
- Children: 2, including Andy
- Education: University of Kentucky

Mary Jane Beshear (née Klingner; born December 13, 1946) is an American educator who served as first lady of Kentucky from 2007 to 2015, during the tenure of her husband, former governor Steve Beshear. She is the mother of current Kentucky governor Andy Beshear.

== Life ==
=== Early life ===
Beshear was born in 1946 as Mary Jane Klingner. She attended the University of Kentucky in Lexington. In 1969, she married Steve Beshear. The couple have two children, Jeffrey Scott Beshear and Andrew Graham Beshear (who is the current Governor of Kentucky), two grandsons, and one granddaughter.

=== First Lady of Kentucky ===
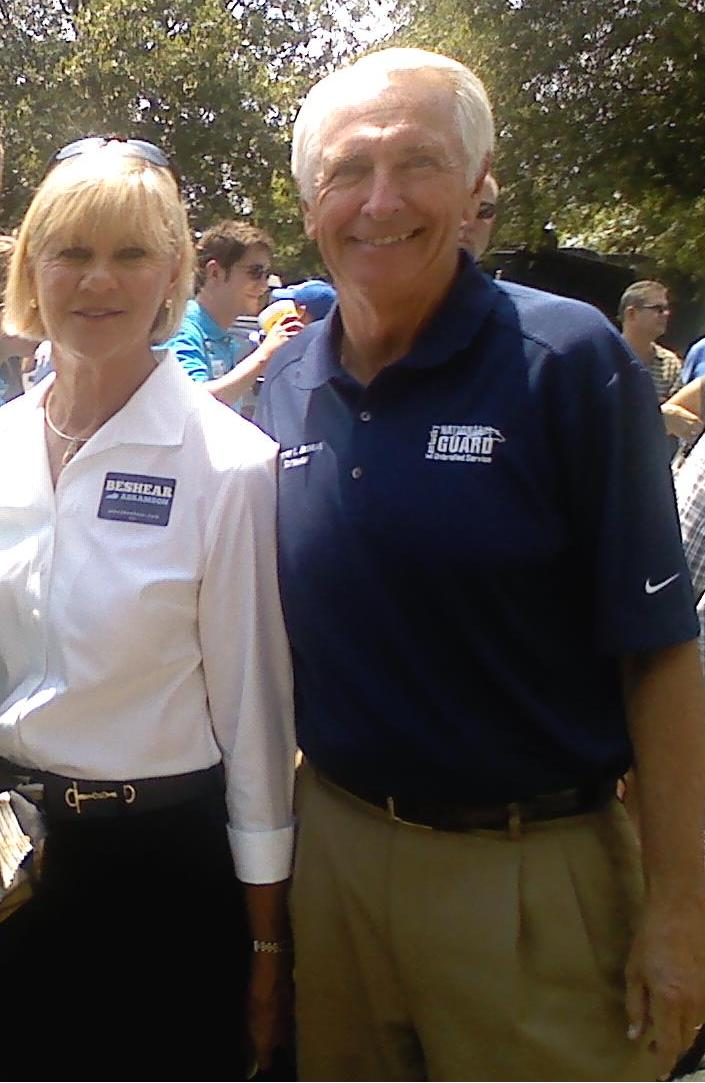
Jane and Steve Beshear at the 2011 Fancy Farm Picnic

In 2007, Beshear assumed the role of First Spouse of Kentucky after her husband, Steve, was elected governor. She held the role until 2015.

A former schoolteacher, Beshear spent five years working with lawmakers to raise the high school dropout age from 16 to 18. She worked to build a consensus for legislation to require students to obtain a diploma or drop out after their 18th birthday. She fostered a compromise that would allow the adoption of the new dropout age to be optional.

In 2015, Beshear helped pass a bill to provide protection from violence from people in dating relationships.

The Jane K. Beshear Capitol Education Center was named in her honor, but less than a year after its opening Governor Matt Bevin renamed the building to honor Kentucky's Gold Star families.

In 2017, Beshear was thrown from her horse while at the Kentucky Horse Park. She was taken to the University of Kentucky Chandler Hospital emergency room for treatment. She suffered a broken wrist and arm, as well as a severe concussion.
