= Family Scholar House =

Family Scholar House is a nonprofit organization based in Louisville, Kentucky. Family Scholar House provides services for single parents, their children, and foster alumni that includes academic coaching, family counseling, affordable supportive housing, career and workforce development, childcare and connection to basic and emergency needs.

== History ==
Family Scholar House began as Project Women in 1995 as collaboration between six orders of religious women to confront the needs of women and children in crisis in Louisville. The recognized the power of education to change lives and developed an educational program to assist single-mothers earn college degrees. Project Women continued to serve a small number of women each year until 2005 when Cathe Dykstra, Family Scholar House's CEO and Chief Possibility Officer, joined the program. Dykstra increased the programs growth by expanding outreach efforts to single-parents and in 2008, Project Women changed its name to Family Scholar House. With the name change, Family Scholar House expanded its services to meet the needs of single-parents and their children to ensure that the entire family succeeds in education. Since 2008, Family Scholar House has seen a significant increase in the number of single parents seeking assistance. As of January 2015, 379 families with 572 children have utilized the Family Scholar House residential program. There are currently 939 families with 1,548 children on the pre-residential housing waiting list. To date, Family Scholar House participants have earned a total of 241 college degrees.

== Campuses ==
In partnership with Marian Development Group, Family Scholar House has built five campuses throughout Louisville. The first campus was opened in 2008 in partnership with University of Louisville's College of Education and Human Development. Louisville Scholar House includes 56 apartments, the Owsley Brown Frazier Academic Services Center, and an Early Learning Campus, which offers care and early learning to children between the ages of 6 weeks and 4-years old through the University of Louisville College of Education and Human Development.

In January 2011, Family Scholar House opened Downtown Scholar House which provides housing to 54 single-parent students and their children. This campus in downtown Louisville is walking distance from Spalding University and Jefferson Community & Technical College, as well as on bus routes to the University of Louisville. The historic Filson Club on campus has been renovated to function as the Academic Services Center. Downtown Scholar House is also home to Linda's Closet which opened in March 2015 and provides business and professional clothing to Family Scholar House.

A third campus, Stoddard Johnston Scholar House, opened in January 2012. It is home to 57 single-parent students and their families and is located on Bradley Avenue near Eastern Parkway in the historic Stoddard Johnston Elementary School. The school building was newly renovated to house apartments and program space, allowing residents to have convenient access to academic advising and case management services.

Construction of the fourth Family Scholar House campus was completed in August 2013. Parkland Scholar House, located at the corner of Catalpa and Dumesnil Streets, is the organization's first campus in west Louisville. After renovating and preserving the historic Parkland Schools and adding two new buildings, this campus now provides homes to 48 families and program services for residents and non-residents in the community. A Family Cafe and Children's Nutrition Lab provides inter-generational family meals and activities for participants and other families, children, and senior citizens in the community.

Family Scholar House's fifth Louisville-area campus opened in August 2018. This Riverport Scholar House campus is home to 32 single-parent families and 32 foster alumni. All adults are in full-time post-secondary educational programs. Riverport Scholar House is part of the larger intergenerational Riverport Landings Development, under the leadership of the Marian Group and LDG Development.

== Programs ==
Family Scholar House serves pre-residential, residential, and post-program single-parents and their children and a smaller group of foster alumni with a comprehensive continuum of care that meets them where they are and empowers them toward their educational, career, and personal goals. All participants have experienced poverty, unstable housing and, most often, domestic violence. Programs and services are responsive to the needs of families and individuals and are provided for all ages.

=== Housing ===
Family Scholar House participants in need of stable housing may apply for the residential program, which includes housing on one of the four Family Scholar Houses campuses. In accordance with HUD (United States Department of Housing and Urban Development) guidelines, participants are responsible for their portion of their rent based on 30% of their gross annual income and their own utilities. All residential participants receive assistance with budgeting and household management.

=== Academic Support Services ===
Participants of Family Scholar House are required to be enrolled full-time at the accredited college or university of their choice. The academic advising provided by Family Scholar House helps single parents enroll in college, obtain financial assistance to pay tuition and fees. Other services provided by Family Scholar House include advising students on their class choices, informing them about work-study programs and scholarship opportunities, acquiring school supplies, assisting with financial aid applications, and advocating for them at their respective schools. As participants near graduation, Family Scholar House assists participants with career services including resume writing, mock interviews, and speed networking events.

In addition to providing academic support to single-parent participants, Family Scholar House works with the children of participants in order to truly break the cycle of inter-generational poverty. Residential parents receive assistance with children so that their children may learn and socialize in a safe environment. Family Scholar House also provides academic support services like tutoring and school supplies to its youngest scholars. As of January 2015, 23 children of Family Scholar House participants were pursuing post-secondary education opportunities.

=== Family Support Services ===
Family Scholar House provides comprehensive case management in order to assist participants in obtaining needed support services and to address barriers to self-sufficiency. Participants meet regularly with family services advocates for guidance, counseling, parenting, goal-setting and coaching. Family Advocates also provides assistance with meeting basic needs by connecting participants to community resources and navigating benefits.

Family Support Services also provides children's programming, life skills workshops, peer support groups, financial education, nutrition and wellness activities, art therapy and home ownership programs.
