= One Goal (film) =

- Directed by: Sergi Agustí
- Screenplay by: Sergi Agustí
- Produced by: Sergi Agustí Films
- Cinematography: Pep Bonet
- Edited by: Aurora Reinlein
- Music by: Fermín Dorado
- Release date: 2008
- Running time: 26 minutes
- Countries: Sierra Leone; Spain

One Goal is a 2008 documentary film directed by the Spanish documentary maker Sergi Agustí.

== Synopsis ==
One Goal is an objective, but also a passion. This documentary follows the path towards peace that a group of young amputated men began in Sierra Leone years ago. Through the power of their game they have become an example for their society. From icons of war to icons of peace and hope, they transformed their lives through a shared passion: football.

== Awards ==
The film was a finalist in the LinkTV online film contest in the category of "Overcoming Conflict". It won the main award at the 14th International Sport Film Festival of 2011 in Liberec. The film won the Paladino di Oro prize at the Sport film Festival in Palermo, Italy in November 2010, and the Venus award to human values at the FILMETS Badalona film Festival in Badalona, Spain in November 2010. It won the Audience Award at the MIRADAS.DOC festival in Tenerife and the Benicassim Festival, Special Jury Mention at the Festival de Alcala de Henares ALCINE38, and the Grand Prize of Spanish Cinema in the ZINEBI Documentary Film Festival of Bilbao among others.
