= Yield Giving =

American philanthropy founded by MacKenzie Scott

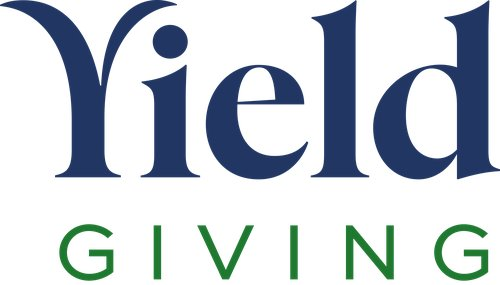
- Founded: July 2020 (first grants); December 2022 (foundation)
- Founder: MacKenzie Scott
- Type: Philanthropic foundation
- Website: yieldgiving.com

Yield Giving is an American foundation which is the primary philanthropic vehicle for MacKenzie Scott, the former wife of Amazon CEO Jeff Bezos. The organization's name is based on her philosophy of adding value in her philanthropy by giving up control to local organizations (localization).

The website was launched in December 2022. At the time, Scott had already donated approximately $14 billion to around 1,600 organizations with $1 billion directed outside the United States after her 2019 divorce from Bezos.

As of the end of 2025, Scott has given away $26.3 billion.

== Scott's donations ==
Prior to launching the Yield Giving website, Scott announced that she had donated $1.7 billion to 116 non-profit organizations, with a focus on racial equality, LGBTQ+ equality, democracy, and climate change in a July 2020 Medium post.

In December 2020, less than six months later, Scott stated that she had donated a further $4.15 billion in the previous four months to 384 organizations, with a focus on providing support to people economically impacted by the COVID-19 pandemic and addressing long-term systemic inequities. She said that after July, she wanted her advisory team to give her wealth away faster as the United States struggled with the unprecedented impact of COVID-19 while billionaires' wealth continued to climb. Her team's focus was on "identifying organizations with strong leadership teams and results, with special attention to those operating in communities facing high projected food insecurity, high measures of racial inequity, high local poverty rates, and low access to philanthropic capital." Scott's 2020 charitable giving totaled $5.8 billion, one of the largest annual distributions by a private individual to working charities.

Scott announced another $2.7 billion in giving to 286 organizations in June 2021. Forbes reported that Scott donated $8.5 billion across 780 organizations in one year (July 2020 to July 2021). In June 2021, Scott and Melinda French Gates launched the Equality Can't Wait Challenge, a contest to promote gender equality and expanding women's power and influence in the United States by 2030. The four winners received $10 million each, and an additional $8 million was split between the two finalists. In February 2022, nine organizations announced gifts from Scott totaling $264.5 million. The Association for Women's Rights in Development received a $15 million donation. On March 23, 2022, more gifts were announced, including $436 million to Habitat for Humanity and $275 million to Planned Parenthood. In May 2022, the Big Brothers, Big Sisters foundation reported a $122.6 million donation from Scott. Scott has also made donations to organizations in Kenya, India, Brazil, Micronesia, and Latin America. In April 2022, The New York Times reported that Scott's donations since 2019 have exceeded $12 billion. In September 2022, Scott donated two of her Beverly Hills homes, worth a combined $55 million, to the California Community Foundation (CCF), which provides grants to mission-based nonprofits in Los Angeles. The organization intended to sell both homes and use 90% of the earnings to fund affordable housing initiatives and direct the other 10% to an immigrant integration program. In October 2022, Scott donated $84.5 million to Girl Scouts of the USA and its 29 local councils. This was the largest donation from an individual in the organization's history. As of November 2022, Scott had donated almost $14 billion to 1500 organizations.

In March 2023, Scott announced Yield Giving would launch an "open call" for community-focused nonprofits with annual budgets between $1 and $5 million that she could fund. Scott planned to make unrestricted $1 million donations to 250 nonprofits selected in the process. Lever for Change announced that Scott's open call for grants prompted 6,000 applicants. Scott donated nearly $2.2 billion in 2023 to 360 organizations supporting early learning, access to affordable housing, race and gender equity, health equity, and civic and social engagement. As of December 2023, Scott had donated more than $16 billion to non-profit organizations. On March 19, 2024, Yield Giving announced another $640 million donated to 361 small nonprofits, more than double what the original open call planned for. 279 organizations received $2 million each while 82 were given $1 million each. In March 2024, Scott's donations had reached $17.2 billion. In December, she announced another $2 billion in donations in a blog on the Yield Giving website.

In December 2024, Scott announced that she began to direct her advisors to invest her wealth in for-profit companies and funds seeking solutions to societal challenges. She stated, "When I make gifts, rather than withdrawing funds from a bank account, or from a stock portfolio that increases the wealth and influence of leaders who already have it, I'd like to withdraw them from a portfolio of investments in mission-aligned ventures."

In 2025, Scott donated $45 million to U.S.-based The Trevor Project, the world's largest LGBTQ suicide prevention nonprofit, the largest single sum donation in the Trevor Project's history.

=== Support for higher education ===
Her initial July 2020 list of donations included over $800 million for historically Black colleges and universities (HBCUs), Hispanic-serving institutions, tribal colleges and universities, and other colleges.

According to official announcements from HBCUs and the UNCF, Scott has donated about $1.06 billion to support HBCUs between 2020 and 2025. From October 2025 to November 2025, Scott donated $739 million to 16 HBCUs, including Bowie State, Clark Atlanta, Norfolk State, North Carolina A&T, Prairie View A&M, University of Maryland Eastern Shore, Voorhees University, Winston-Salem State, and Xavier University of Louisiana. The awards ranged from $19 million for Philander Smith University to $80 million for Howard University.

On December 4, 2025, California State University, East Bay announced that they have received a $50 million gift from Scott, which is the largest philanthropic donation in school history. The gift is set to accelerate student success and economic impact in the San Francisco Bay Area. On the same day, Lehman College in the Bronx announced that they had received a gift of $50 million from Scott, the largest philanthropic gift in the history of the college, which was founded in 1968 and is part of the City University of New York. Scott previously gave $30 million to Lehman College in 2020. The gift will create a permanent resource for scholarships, student programs, and academic excellence. Scott confirmed that she donated a total of $7.1 billion to nonprofits in 2025, with over $1 billion of that given to higher education.

In Chicago, she also donated to the University of Illinois Chicago ($40 million), United Way of Chicago $25 million, Chicago Public Schools ($25 million), OneGoal ($20 million), and One Million Degrees.

== Reception ==
Forbes reported, "the unrestricted and ultimately more trusting nature of Scott's philanthropy is the exception, not the norm in their world." The New York Times noted that "Ms. Scott has turned traditional philanthropy on its head... by disbursing her money quickly and without much hoopla, Ms. Scott has pushed the focus away from the giver, and onto the nonprofits, she is trying to help." Scott stated she believed "teams with experience on the front lines of challenges will know best how to put the money to good use." According to a report from the Center for Effective Philanthropy, slightly more than half of the 277 nonprofit organizations surveyed stated that their grant from Scott has made fundraising easier, with some saying they are able to use it as leverage with other donors and the large gift "has enabled organizations to focus funds where they were most needed to achieve their mission." According to Senior Vice President of the Rockefeller Philanthropy Advisors, Renee Karibi-Whyte, competitions like Scott's open call can help organizations who do not have connections with a specific funder get considered.
