= OneGoal =

- Established: 2007; 19 years ago
- Founder: Jeff Nelson
- Type: Nonprofit
- Legal status: 501(c)(3)
- Headquarters: Chicago, Illinois, US
- Chair: Ron Sonenthal
- CEO: Melissa Connelly
- Website: https://www.onegoal.org/

OneGoal is an American educational nonprofit organization that partners with schools to provide postsecondary advising and support for students from low-income communities. Founded in Chicago in 2007, the organization developed a school-based model in which teachers lead a college-readiness class and continue supporting the same students during the transition from high school into postsecondary education. As of 2025, OneGoal's classes had served more than 30,000 students, with 80 percent of its graduates enrolled in college or vocational school, according to a New York Times editorial.

== History ==
OneGoal began in Chicago in 2007 under the name Urban Students Empowered, also abbreviated as US Empowered. The organization's cofounders included venture capitalist Eddie Lou, Northwestern University doctoral student Dawn Pankonien, and teachers Matt King and Jeff Nelson. Its early work grew out of an afterschool college-preparation program at Dunbar Vocational High School on Chicago's South Side.

Jeff Nelson, a Teach For America alumnus, became executive director in January 2007.

In 2010, 227 students at 11 Chicago high schools were participating in the organization's three-year program. In 2012, it expanded outside Chicago for the first time by launching in Houston and was renamed OneGoal. By 2013, OneGoal was in 23 Chicago high schools with 1,300 students enrolled. As of 2025, OneGoal's classes had served more than 30,000 students across the country.

== Program ==
OneGoal's core model is a teacher-led, three-year program that begins with a cohort of high school students and continues into the first year after graduation. The organization trains teachers to lead a college-readiness class and remain with the same students over multiple years, with cohorts generally beginning during junior year, meeting regularly through high school, and receiving online or direct support after graduation.

The curriculum includes college applications, application essays, financial-aid applications, college matching, scholarship guidance, and other practical steps in the transition from high school to postsecondary education. The program has also emphasized noncognitive or behavioral skills, including resilience, ambition, resourcefulness, integrity, professionalism, goal setting, time management, and study skills.

Paul Tough’s 2012 book, How Children Succeed, discusses OneGoal as an intervention for students whose academic records made college completion statistically unlikely but who showed ambition and capacity for improvement. Tough writes that OneGoal teachers recruited cohorts of roughly 25 students and stayed with them through high school and into the first year of college. He describes the program as combining academic preparation, practical college-navigation support, and explicit instruction in noncognitive skills.

== Research ==
In 2010, program officials said 98 percent of participants had been accepted to four-year colleges since the organization's founding with an average GPA increase of 0.29 and an average ACT gain of 3.5 points among program students. In 2012, Fast Company reported that 85 percent of OneGoal students were persisting in college.

In 2022, a University of Chicago report found that OneGoal participants had stronger postsecondary outcomes than comparable Chicago students. In 2024, the Journal of Human Capital published a peer-reviewed study of noncognitive skill development in adolescence using Chicago Public Schools and the OneGoal program. A 2025 New York Times editorial noted that 80 percent of OneGoal graduates enrolled in college or vocational school.
