= MacKenzie Scott =

American philanthropist and novelist (born 1970)

- Born: MacKenzie Scott Tuttle; April 7, 1970 (age 56); San Francisco, California, U.S.
- Other name: MacKenzie Bezos
- Education: Princeton University (BA)
- Occupations: Novelist; philanthropist
- Organization: Yield Giving
- Notable work: The Testing of Luther Albright
- Spouses: Jeff Bezos (m. 1993; div. 2019); Dan Jewett (m. 2021; div. 2023)
- Children: 4
- Awards: American Book Award (2006)

MacKenzie Scott (née Tuttle, formerly Bezos; born April 7, 1970) is an American novelist, philanthropist, and early contributor to Amazon. She was married to Jeff Bezos, the co-founder of Amazon, from 1993 to 2019.

As of December 2025, she had a net worth of US$40.0 billion, according to Bloomberg Billionaires Index, owning a 1.3 percent stake in Amazon. As such, Scott was the third-wealthiest woman in the United States and the 40th-wealthiest person in the world. Scott was named one of Time's 100 most influential people in 2020 and one of the world's 100 most powerful women by Forbes in 2021, 2023 and 2025.

In 2006, Scott won an American Book Award for her 2005 debut novel, The Testing of Luther Albright. Her second novel, Traps, was published in 2013.

She has been executive director of Bystander Revolution, an anti-bullying organization, since she founded it in 2014. She is committed to giving at least half of her wealth to charity as a signatory to the Giving Pledge. Scott made $5.8 billion in charitable gifts in 2020, one of the largest annual distributions by a private individual to working charities. She donated a further $2.7 billion in 2021. As of December 2025, Scott had given a total of $26.3 billion to over 1,600 charitable organizations through her vehicle, Yield Giving.

== Early life and education ==
MacKenzie Scott Tuttle was born on April 7, 1970, in San Francisco, California, to Holiday Robin (née Cuming), a homemaker, and Jason Baker Tuttle, a financial planner. She has two brothers. She says she remembers writing seriously at the age of six, when she wrote The Book Worm, a 142-page book that was destroyed in a flood.

In 1988, she graduated from the Hotchkiss School in Lakeville, Connecticut. In 1992, Tuttle earned her bachelor's degree in English from Princeton University, where she studied under Nobel Laureate in Literature Toni Morrison, who in 2013 described her as "one of the best students I've ever had in my creative writing classes".

== Career ==
After graduating from college, Tuttle worked as a research assistant to Toni Morrison for the 1992 novel Jazz. She also worked in New York City in an administrative role for hedge fund D. E. Shaw, where she met Jeff Bezos.

=== Amazon ===
In 1993, Scott and Bezos married. The following year, they left D. E. Shaw, moved to Seattle, and Bezos founded Amazon with Scott's support. Scott was one of Amazon's early key contributors, and was heavily involved in Amazon's early days, working on the company's name, business plan, accounts and order shipping, and negotiating the company's first freight contract. After 1996, Scott took a less involved role in the business, focusing on her literary career and family. Their oldest son was born in 2000.

=== Literary career ===
Scott was introduced to the literary agent Amanda "Binky" Urban by Toni Morrison, her former professor. In 2005, she published her debut novel, The Testing of Luther Albright, which won an American Book Award in 2006. Scott said that the book took her ten years to write as she was helping Bezos build Amazon and raising her family. Toni Morrison reviewed the book as "a rarity: a sophisticated novel that breaks and swells the heart". Her second novel, Traps, was published in 2013. According to NPD BookScan, sales of her books were modest.

In August 2026, over a decade after her last novel was published, Scott serialized a speculative political thriller for free on Substack titled Last Days in Two Nations (A History in Eighteen Minds). The novel is set in a post-pandemic America divided into two nations.

== Personal life ==
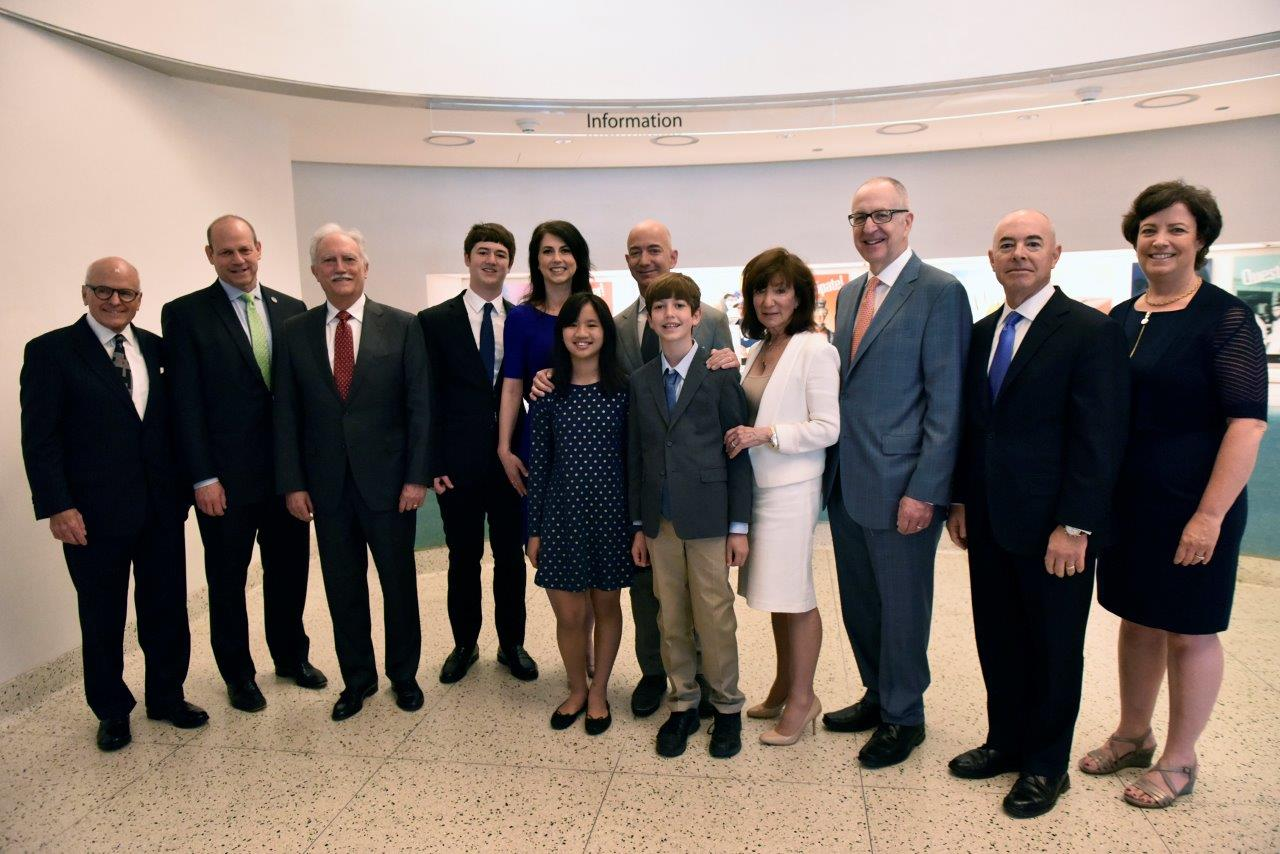
At a naturalization ceremony on June 14, 2016 (center in the back)

Scott was married to Jeff Bezos, whom she met while working as an administrative assistant at D. E. Shaw in 1992. After three months of dating, they married and moved from Manhattan to Seattle, Washington, in 1994. They have four children: three sons and an adopted daughter. Their oldest son was born in 2000.

Their community property divorce in 2019 left Scott with $35.6 billion in Amazon stock, but her former husband retained 75% of the couple's Amazon stock. She became the third-wealthiest woman in the world and one of the wealthiest people overall in April 2019. In July 2020, Scott was ranked the 22nd-richest person in the world by Forbes with a net worth estimated at $36 billion. By September 2020, Scott was named the world's richest woman, and by December 2020, her net worth was estimated at $62 billion.

After her divorce from Jeff Bezos, MacKenzie Bezos changed her name to MacKenzie Scott, with the surname deriving from her middle name given at birth, which was the surname of her maternal grandfather, G. Scott Cuming.

In 2021, Scott married Lakeside School science teacher Dan Jewett. The marriage was revealed in Jewett's Giving Pledge letter posted in March 2021. In September 2022, Scott filed for divorce, which was finalized in January 2023.

In December 2024, Scott announced that she began to direct her advisors to invest her wealth in for-profit companies and funds seeking solutions to societal challenges.

== Philanthropy ==
Since her divorce from Bezos, Scott has become a major philanthropist. In May 2019, Scott signed the Giving Pledge, a charitable-giving campaign in which she undertook to give away most of her wealth to charity over her lifetime or in her will. Much of her philanthropy is organized through Yield Giving which she uses to distribute her wealth with an emphasis on trust-based, high-impact giving.

In December 2021, Scott faced backlash for a Medium post when she stated she would not reveal how much money she has donated or to whom. She subsequently announced that her team would build a website to share details of her philanthropy. In December 2022, she posted the link to her donation database, called Yield Giving. Per the website, "Yield is named after a belief in adding value by giving up control", prioritizing unrestricted donations to community-led organizations and underserved institutions.

=== Donations ===
In a July 2020 Medium post, Scott announced that she had donated $1.7 billion to 116 non-profit organizations, with a focus on racial equality, LGBTQ+ equality, democracy, and climate change.

In December 2020, less than six months later, Scott stated that she had donated a further $4.15 billion in the previous four months to 384 organizations, with a focus on providing support to people economically impacted by the COVID-19 pandemic and addressing long-term systemic inequities.

Scott announced another $2.7 billion in giving to 286 organizations in June 2021. Forbes reported that Scott donated $8.5 billion across 780 organizations in one year (July 2020 to July 2021). In February 2022, nine organizations announced gifts from Scott totaling $264.5 million. On March 23, 2022, more gifts were announced, including $436 million to Habitat for Humanity and $275 million to Planned Parenthood. In May 2022, the Big Brothers, Big Sisters foundation reported a $122.6 million donation from Scott.

In April 2022, The New York Times reported that Scott's donations since 2019 have exceeded $12 billion. As of November 2022, Scott had donated nearly $14 billion to approximately 1500 organizations, including Friends of the Children.

In March 2023, Scott announced an "open call" for community-focused nonprofits with annual budgets between $1 and $5 million that she could fund. Lever for Change announced that Scott's open call for grants prompted 6,000 applicants. The result was announced on March 19, 2024. She ended up donating $640 million to 361 small nonprofits, giving more than double what the original open call planned for, with 279 non-profits receiving $2 million each, and 82 groups receiving $1 million each.

By the end of 2025, Scott made a $45 million donation to The Trevor Project, having previously donated $6 million to the organization in 2020. In total, by the end of 2025, she had given away $26.3 billion.

== Bibliography ==
- The Testing of Luther Albright. Fourth Estate. 2005. ISBN 006075141X. LCCN 2004063235.
- Traps. Knopf. 2013. ISBN 9780307959737. LCCN 2012029032.

== See also ==
- List of Princeton University alumni
