= Lundergan =

Lundergan is a surname. Notable people with the surname include:

- Alison Lundergan Grimes (born 1978), née Alison Lundergan, American lawyer and politician
- Jerry Lundergan (born 1946/1947), American businessman and politician, father of Alison
