= 2002 United States Senate election in Kentucky =

- November 5, 2002
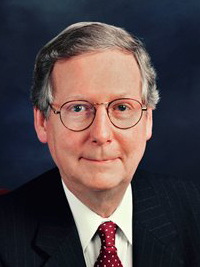

Nominee	Mitch McConnell	Lois Combs Weinberg
Party	Republican	Democratic
Popular vote	731,679	399,634
Percentage	64.68%	35.32%
- County results McConnell: 50–60% 60–70% 70–80% 80–90% Weinberg: 50–60% 60–70%
U.S. senator before election
Mitch McConnell
Republican
Elected U.S. Senator
Mitch McConnell
Republican

The 2002 United States Senate election in Kentucky was held on November 5, 2002. Incumbent Republican U.S. Senator Mitch McConnell won re-election to a fourth term. This election was McConnell's biggest margin of victory to date. It is the only election in which he won Franklin County, and the most recent in which he won urban Jefferson and Fayette counties. The latter two were the only Kentucky counties won by either Hillary Clinton in 2016 or Joe Biden in 2020, signifying their leftward drift.

== Republican primary ==
=== Candidates ===
- Mitch McConnell, incumbent U.S. senator

=== Results ===
McConnell was unopposed.

== Democratic primary ==
=== Candidates ===
- Tom Barlow, former U.S. representative from Paducah (1993–95)
- Lois Combs Weinberg, vice chair of the Council on Postsecondary Education in Kentucky

=== Results ===
Democratic primary results by county Combs Weinberg: 50–60%; 60–70%; 70–80%; Barlow: 50–60%; 60–70%; 70–80%; 80–90%

Democratic primary results
Party	Candidate	Votes	%
Democratic	Lois Combs Weinberg	231,013	50.10%
Democratic	Tom Barlow	230,055	49.90%
Total votes		461,068	100.00%

== General election ==
=== Candidates ===
- Mitch McConnell (R), incumbent U.S. senator
- Lois Combs Weinberg (D), vice chair of the Council on Postsecondary Education in Kentucky

=== Predictions ===
Source	Ranking	As of
Sabato's Crystal Ball	Safe R	November 4, 2002

=== Polling ===
Poll source	Date(s) administered	Sample size (Note: Key: A – all adults RV – registered voters LV – likely voters V – unclear)	Margin of error	Mitch McConnell (R)	Lois Weinberg (D)	Other / Undecided
SurveyUSA	October 28–30, 2002	705 (LV)	± 3.8%	66%	29%	4%

=== Results ===
General election results
Party	Candidate	Votes	%	±%
Republican	Mitch McConnell (incumbent)	731,679	64.68%	+9.22%
Democratic	Lois Combs Weinberg	399,634	35.32%	−7.52%
Majority		332,045	29.35%	+16.74%
Total votes		1,131,313	100.00%	
Republican hold				

==== Counties that flipped from Democratic to Republican ====
- Magoffin (largest city: Salyersville)
- Webster (largest city: Providence)
- Morgan (largest city: West Liberty)
- Henderson (largest city: Henderson)
- Letcher (largest city: Jenkins)
- Muhlenberg (largest city: Central City)
- Fulton (largest city: Fulton)
- Bath (largest city: Owingsville)
- Marion (largest city: Lebanon)
- Menifee (largest city: Frenchburg)
- Rowan (largest city: Morehead)
- Jefferson (largest city: Louisville)
- Carlisle (largest city: Bardwell)
- Livingston (largest city: Salem)
- Hopkins (largest city: Madisonville)
- Marshall (largest city: Benton)
- Graves (largest city: Mayfield)
- Hickman (largest city: Clinton)
- Lyon (largest city: Eddyville)
- Montgomery (largest city: Mount Sterling)
- Union (largest city: Morganfield)
- Perry (largest city: Hazard)
- Ballard (largest city: LaCenter)
- Boyd (largest city: Ashland)
- Harlan (largest city: Cumberland)

== See also ==
- 2002 United States Senate election
