= Senator Higdon =

Senator Higdon may refer to:

- Greg Higdon (born 1947), Kentucky State Senate
- Jimmy Higdon (born 1953), Kentucky State Senate
