= 1996 United States Senate election in Kentucky =

- November 5, 1996
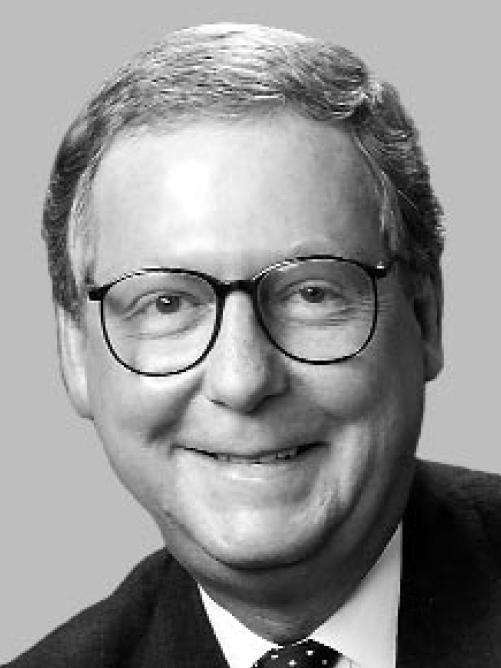

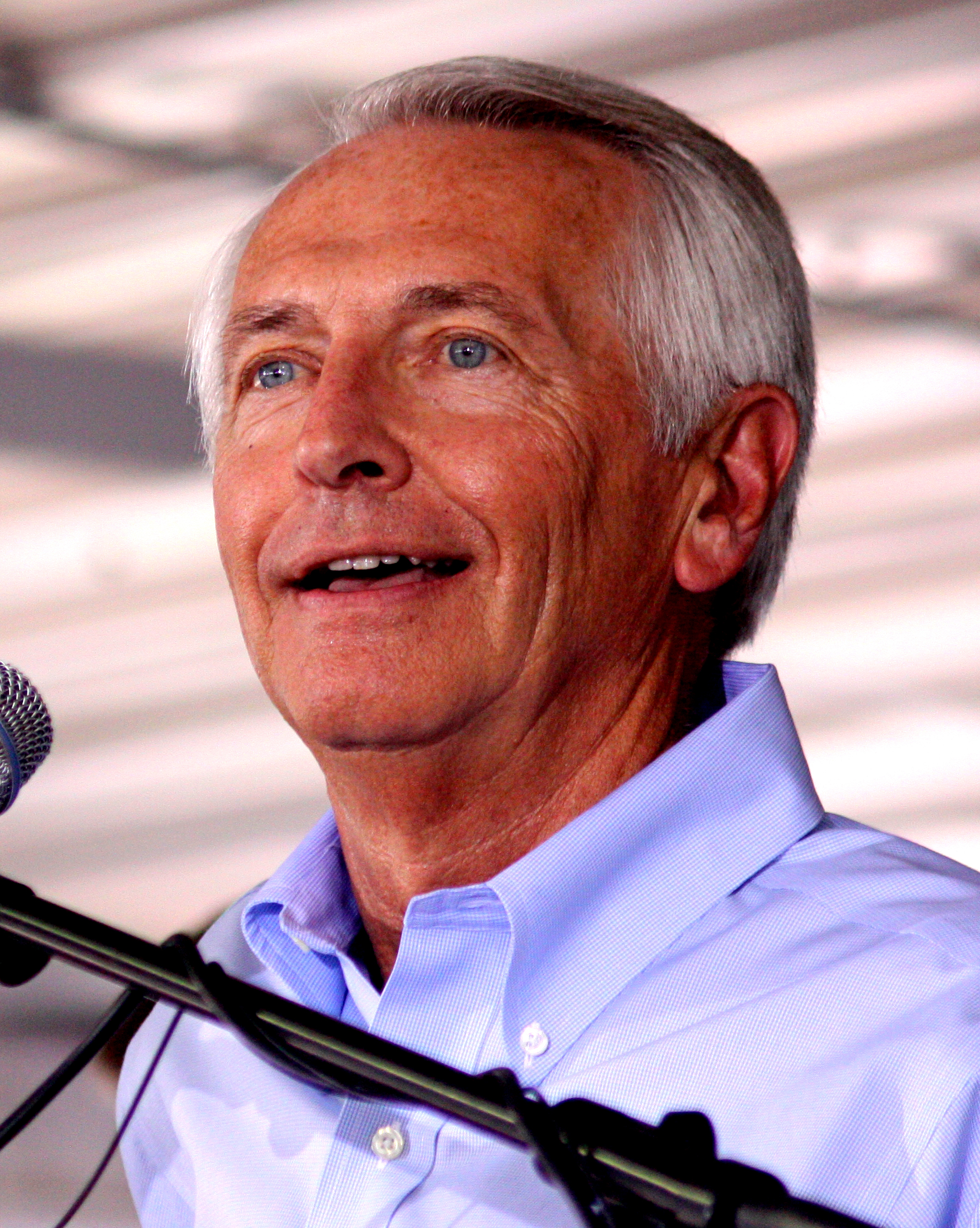
Nominee	Mitch McConnell	Steve Beshear
Party	Republican	Democratic
Popular vote	724,794	560,012
Percentage	55.45%	42.85%
- County results McConnell: 40–50% 50–60% 60–70% 70–80% Beshear: 40–50% 50–60% 60–70% 70–80%
U.S. senator before election
Mitch McConnell
Republican
Elected U.S. Senator
Mitch McConnell
Republican

The 1996 United States Senate election in Kentucky was held on November 5, 1996. Incumbent Republican U.S. Senator Mitch McConnell won re-election to a third term with a 12.6% margin of victory over Democrat Steve Beshear, who later successfully ran in 2007 and 2011 for governor of Kentucky.

== Republican primary ==
=== Candidates ===
- Tommy Klein, perennial candidate
- Mitch McConnell, incumbent U.S. senator

=== Results ===
Republican primary results
Party	Candidate	Votes	%
Republican	Mitch McConnell (incumbent)	88,620	88.59%
Republican	Tommy Klein	11,410	11.41%
Total votes		100,030	100.00%

== Democratic primary ==
=== Candidates ===
- Tom Barlow, former U.S. representative from Paducah (1993–95)
- Steve Beshear, former lieutenant governor of Kentucky, former attorney general of Kentucky and former state representative
- Shelby Lanier, perennial candidate

=== Results ===
Democratic primary results
Party	Candidate	Votes	%
Democratic	Steve Beshear	177,859	66.38%
Democratic	Tom Barlow	64,235	23.97%
Democratic	Shelby Lanier	25,856	9.65%
Total votes		267,950	100.00%

== General election ==
=== Candidates ===
- Steve Beshear (Democratic), former lieutenant governor of Kentucky, former attorney general of Kentucky and former Kentucky state representative
- Mac Elroy (U.S. Tax Payers)
- Dennis Lacy (Libertarian)
- Mitch McConnell (Republican), incumbent U.S. senator
- Patricia Jo Metten (Natural Law)

=== Fundraising ===
Campaign finance reports as of December 31, 1996
Candidate	Raised	Spent	Cash on hand
Mitch McConnell (R)	$5,030,245	$5,031,293	$189,324
Steve Beshear (D)	$1,772,276	$1,770,035	$1,448
Source: Federal Election Commission

=== Campaign ===
In 1996, Beshear started out trailing against McConnell, with an early general election poll placing McConnell ahead of Beshear 50% to 32%. The campaign ultimately became quite harsh, with the McConnell campaign sending "Hunt Man," a take off of Chicken George dressed in "the red velvet coat, jodhpurs, black riding boots and black helmet of a patrician fox hunter." This was done as a means of criticizing Beshear's membership in a fox hunting club in Lexington, and undercut the Beshear campaign's message that McConnell was a Republican in the mold of Newt Gingrich and that Beshear was the only friend of the working class in the race. Beshear did not make much traction with the electorate during the campaign. By October 1996, Beshear had narrowed the gap between himself and McConnell slightly, with McConnell leading Beshear 50% to 38%.

=== Results ===
General election results
Party	Candidate	Votes	%	±%
Republican	Mitch McConnell (incumbent)	724,794	55.45%	+3.27%
Democratic	Steve Beshear	560,012	42.85%	−4.97%
Libertarian	Dennis L. Lacy	8,595	0.66%	
Natural Law	Patricia Jo Metten	8,344	0.64%	
U.S. Taxpayers	Mac Elroy	5,284	0.40%	
Write-ins		17	0.00%	
Majority		164,782	12.61%	+8.23%
Total votes		1,307,046	100.00%	
Republican hold				

== See also ==
- 1996 United States Senate elections
