= Governor Beshear =

Governor Beshear may refer to:

- Andy Beshear (born 1977), 63rd Governor of Kentucky
- Steve Beshear (born 1944), 61st Governor of Kentucky
