= Elaine Walker (politician) =

American politician (born 1951)

Kentucky Department of Parks Commissioner
- In office January 2, 2012 – December 15, 2015
- Governor: Steve Beshear; Matt Bevin
- Preceded by: Gerry van der Meer
- Succeeded by: Donnie Holland

84th Secretary of State of Kentucky
- In office January 29, 2011 – January 2, 2012
- Governor: Steve Beshear
- Preceded by: Trey Grayson
- Succeeded by: Alison Lundergan Grimes

39th Mayor of Bowling Green, Kentucky
- In office January 1, 2005 – January 28, 2011
- Preceded by: Sandy Jones
- Succeeded by: Joe Denning

Personal details
- Born: Elaine Nogay; August 6, 1951 (age 74) Ogden, Utah, U.S.
- Party: Democratic
- Spouse: Dorian Walker
- Occupation: Mayor
- Profession: Politician

Elaine Nogay Walker (born August 6, 1951) is an American politician from the Democratic Party and a former Secretary of State of the Commonwealth of Kentucky. Walker served as Commissioner of the Kentucky Department of Parks and, prior to her appointment as Secretary of State, served as the 39th mayor of Bowling Green, Kentucky.

== Early education, and pre-political career ==
Walker moved to Bowling Green from California during the summer of 1993 with her husband and children. Walker, co-owner of Peridot Pictures, hosted a local Public-access television cable TV show for nine years prior to her election as mayor. She was also chair of the board for the Bowling Green Public Library, providing services such as the Book-fest co-chair in 2004. Historic preservation is one of her personal interests and she has been involved in numerous historical preservation groups. She has been Chair of the Bowling Green Downtown Redevelopment Authority. She was a Hobson House Commission Commissioner. She was also a College Hill Historic District Board Member.

== Mayor of Bowling Green ==
The mayor Walker succeeded, Sandy Jones, denied requesting that she suspend her hosting duties during the months prior to the election.

Transparency has been somewhat accomplished through the addition of a planning meeting to the city commission meetings. Originally created by the Mayor to help the almost all new city commissioners and her learn the ropes, these meetings have been significantly shortened as the new commissioners learn about city government and the processes used therein. These additional meetings are held in the afternoons prior to the city commission meetings.

== Kentucky Secretary of State ==
On January 7, 2011, Kentucky Governor Steve Beshear announced that he would appoint Walker as the new Secretary of State of Kentucky, following Trey Grayson's announcement of resignation. Walker was sworn in on January 29, 2011.

Walker was a candidate in the May 17, 2011 Kentucky primary election to become the Democratic nominee for a full term as Secretary of State and was defeated by Alison Lundergan Grimes.

== Commissioner of the Kentucky Department of Parks ==
On December 5, 2011, Kentucky Tourism, Arts and Heritage Cabinet Secretary Marcheta Sparrow announced that Walker had been named Commissioner of the Kentucky Department of Parks. The appointment became effective January 2, 2012, immediately upon the end of her term as Secretary of State. Walker was honored by the Kentucky State House on January 31 for her work to protect the hours of Park field staff. Resolution HR 14 was introduced by Reps. Tanya Pullin and Rick Nelson and adopted by voice vote.

== See also ==
- List of mayors of Bowling Green, Kentucky

Political offices
Preceded by Charles Merwin "Trey" Grayson III	Secretary of State of Kentucky; 2011	Succeeded by Alison Lundergan Grimes
