= Attorney General Beshear =

Attorney General Beshear may refer to:

- Andy Beshear (born 1977), Attorney General of Kentucky, son of Steve Beshear
- Steve Beshear (born 1944), Attorney General of Kentucky
