= Anne Gay Donworth =

American politician

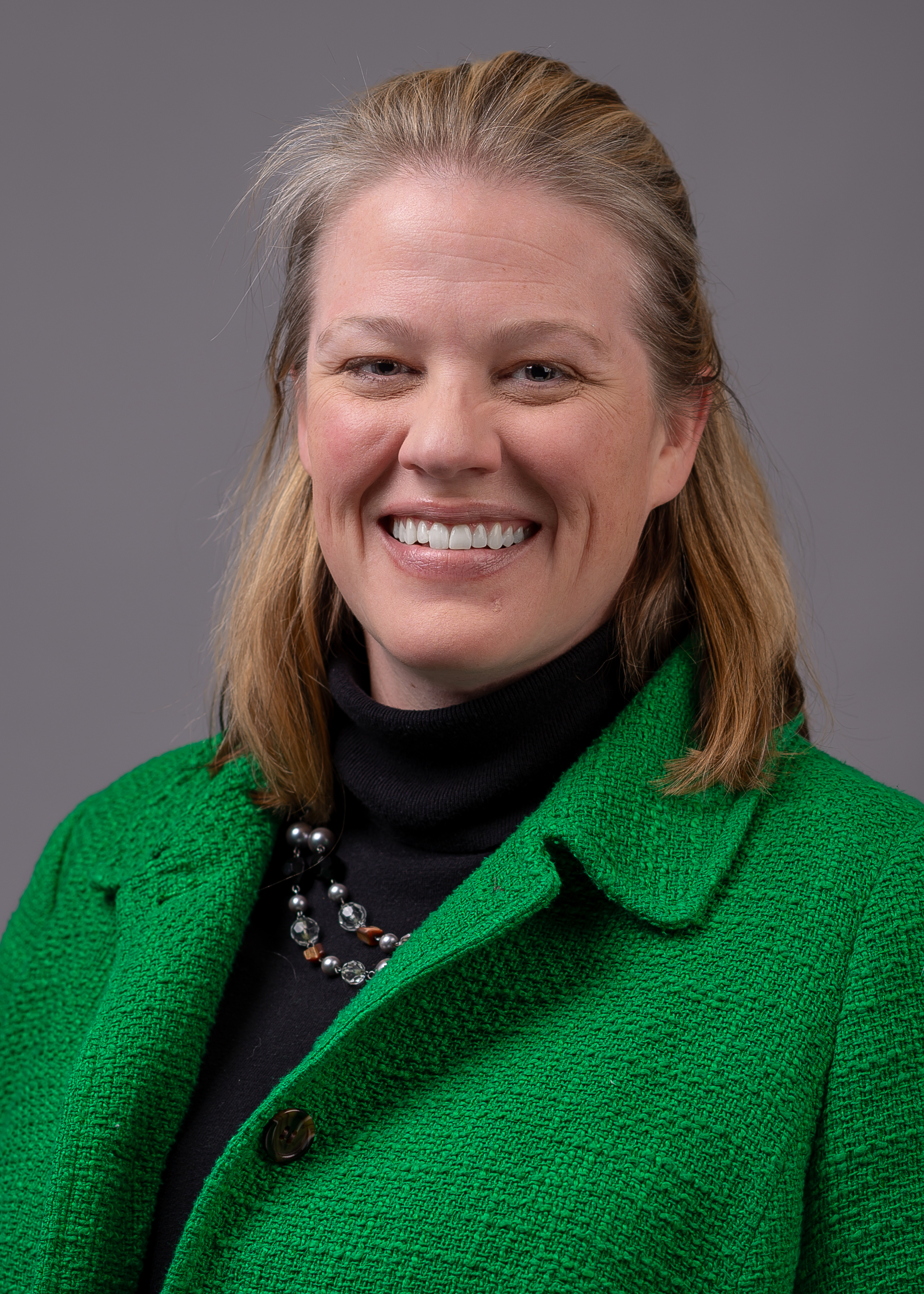

Member of the Kentucky House of Representatives from the 76th district
- Incumbent
- Assumed office January 1, 2025
- Preceded by: Ruth Ann Palumbo

Personal details
- Born: May 16, 1983 (age 43)
- Party: Democratic
- Children: 2
- Website: House website Campaign website

Anne Gay Donworth (born May 16, 1983) is an American politician who has served as a member of the Kentucky House of Representatives since January 2025. She represents the 76th district, which includes part of Fayette County.

== Biography ==
=== Political career ===
Donworth was elected unopposed in the 2024 Kentucky House of Representatives election following the retirement of incumbent representative Ruth Ann Palumbo. She defeated two other candidates in the May Democratic primary election.

== Electoral history ==
=== 2024 ===
Democratic primary results
Party	Candidate	Votes	%
Democratic	Anne Gay Donworth	1,777	44.4
Democratic	James “Jamie” Palumbo	1,627	40.7
Democratic	Joshua Daniel Buckman	594	14.9
Total votes		3,998	100.0

2024 Kentucky House of Representatives 76th district election
Party	Candidate	Votes	%
Democratic	Anne Gay Donworth	Unopposed	
Total votes		14,790	100.0
Democratic hold			

== Publications ==
- Donworth, Anne Gay (July 24, 2020). "As Fayette schools go virtual, employers need to work with working parents". The Lexington Herald-Leader.

Kentucky House of Representatives
Preceded by Ruth Ann Palumbo	Member of the Kentucky House of Representatives from the 76th district 2025–present	Succeeded by incumbent
