= Alison Lundergan Grimes =

American politician (born 1978)

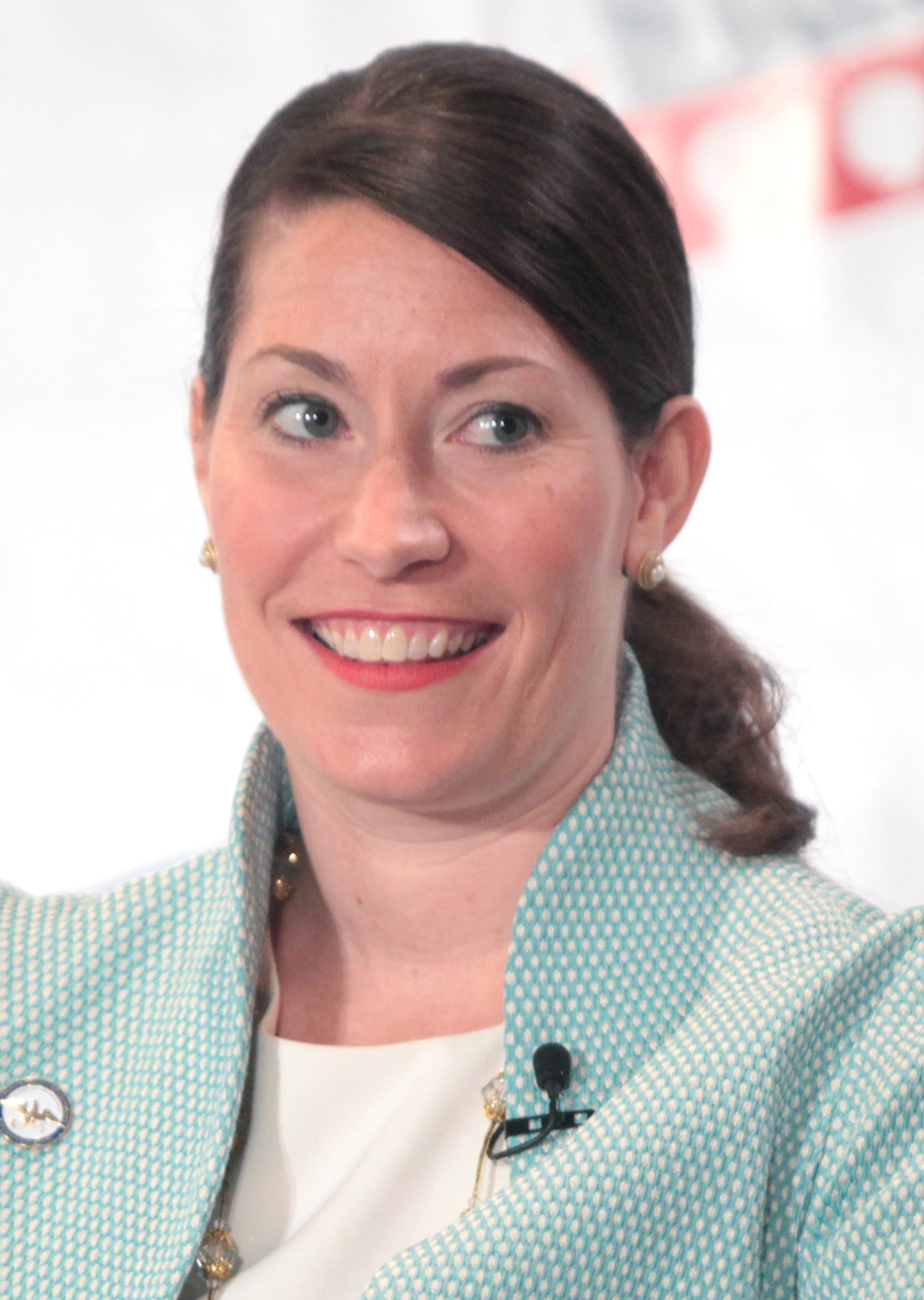
- Grimes in 2016

85th Secretary of State of Kentucky
- In office January 2, 2012 – January 6, 2020
- Governor: Steve Beshear; Matt Bevin; Andy Beshear
- Preceded by: Elaine Walker
- Succeeded by: Michael Adams

Personal details
- Born: Alison Case Lundergan; November 23, 1978 (age 47) Maysville, Kentucky, U.S.
- Party: Democratic
- Spouse: Andrew Grimes (m. 2006)
- Children: 3
- Education: Rhodes College (BA); American University (JD)

Alison Case Lundergan Grimes (born November 23, 1978) is an American lawyer and Democratic politician who was the secretary of state of Kentucky from 2012 until 2020. Grimes was elected in 2011 after defeating incumbent Elaine Walker in the Democratic primary and Republican candidate Bill Johnson in the general election. She was the Democratic nominee for the United States Senate in 2014, unsuccessfully challenging Republican incumbent and Senate Minority Leader Mitch McConnell. She was re-elected for a second term as Secretary of State of Kentucky on November 3, 2015, defeating Republican Stephen Knipper. Term limited in 2019, she was succeeded by Republican Michael Adams.

== Early life and education ==
Alison Case Lundergan was born in Maysville, Kentucky, the daughter of Charlotte (née Case) and Jerry Lundergan, a former Kentucky Democratic chairman and state representative. She is the middle child of five siblings, all girls. As a child, she knocked on doors on behalf of her father's political campaigns, and later drove voters to the polls on election day. Grimes grew up wanting to be a doctor, but changed majors in college after passing out while watching carpal tunnel surgery.

Grimes went to Lexington Catholic High School in Lexington, Kentucky, and then went on to graduate from Rhodes College in 2001. Grimes majored in political science, with a minor in history. Grimes is a member of the Chi Omega sorority and served as president of her college chapter; she also served as a student trustee and a member of student government. Grimes received her Juris Doctor degree cum laude from the Washington College of Law at American University in Washington, D.C. While at American, Grimes participated in public policy research for the National Kidney Foundation.

== Career ==
Prior to running for Secretary of State, Grimes was a practicing attorney in Lexington. She served as an associate at Stoll Keenon Ogden from 2004 to 2011, specializing in intellectual property and complex business litigation.

Grimes served as president of the Fayette County Women Lawyers' Association, and was awarded the 2010 Outstanding Young Lawyer Award by the Fayette County Bar Association.

Grimes has served numerous times as delegate to the Democratic National Convention, supporting candidate Hillary Clinton in 2008, Barack Obama in 2012, and party nominee Hillary Clinton in 2016. She addressed the 2016 Democratic National Convention on the evening of the official roll call vote as a close personal friend of the party's nominee Hillary Clinton. She was named one of the "new stars of the Democratic Party" after her address.

Grimes led the Democratic ticket in each of her three statewide races. She currently serves on the board of advisors of Let America Vote, an organization founded by former Missouri secretary of state Jason Kander designed to combat voter suppression.

Grimes endorsed Charles Booker in the 2020 U.S. Senate election in Kentucky over Amy McGrath, a surprise to some observers of the race who note that Booker is the more progressive of the two candidates.

== Secretary of State ==
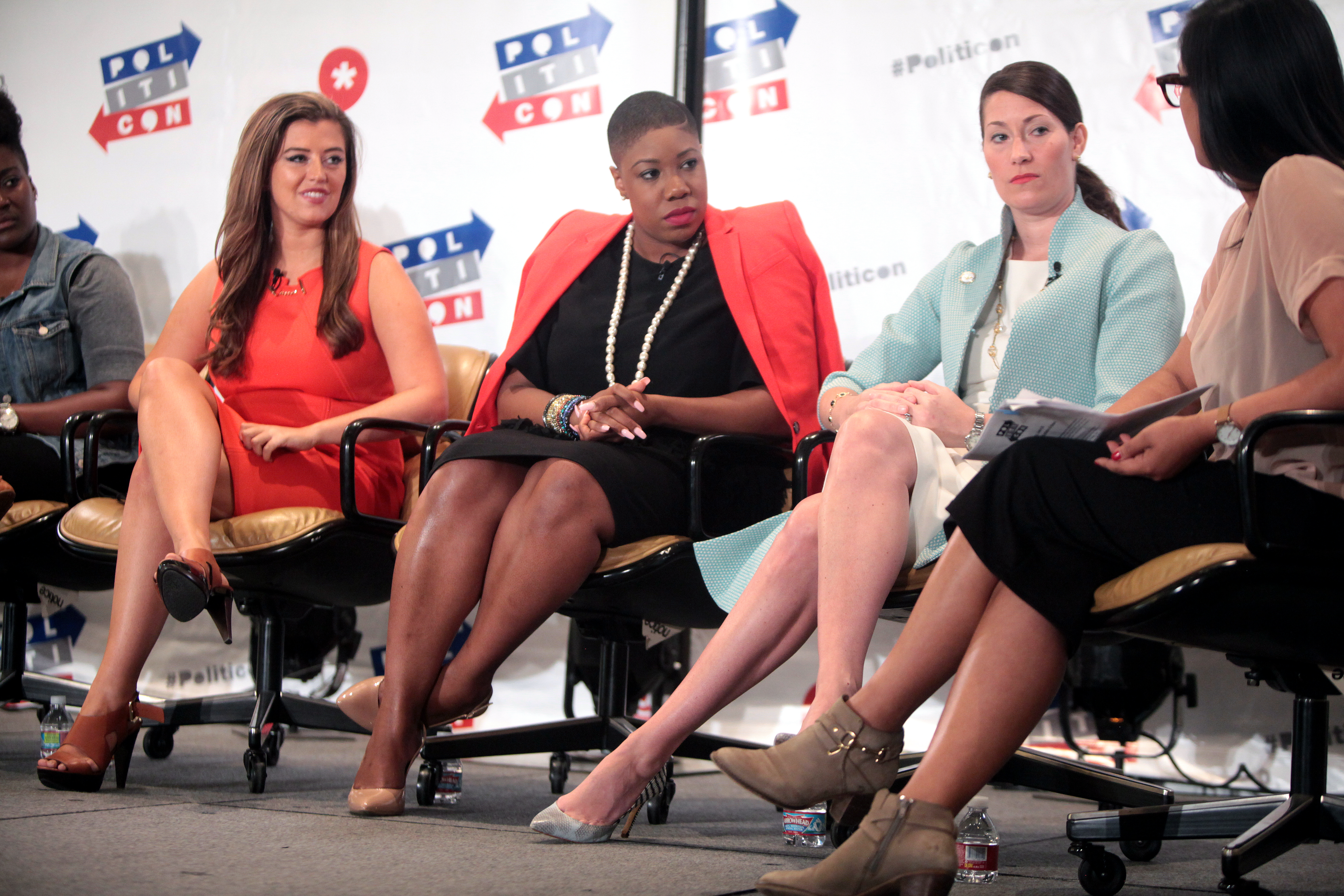
Grimes (second from right) at the 2016 Politicon at the Pasadena Convention Center in Pasadena, California

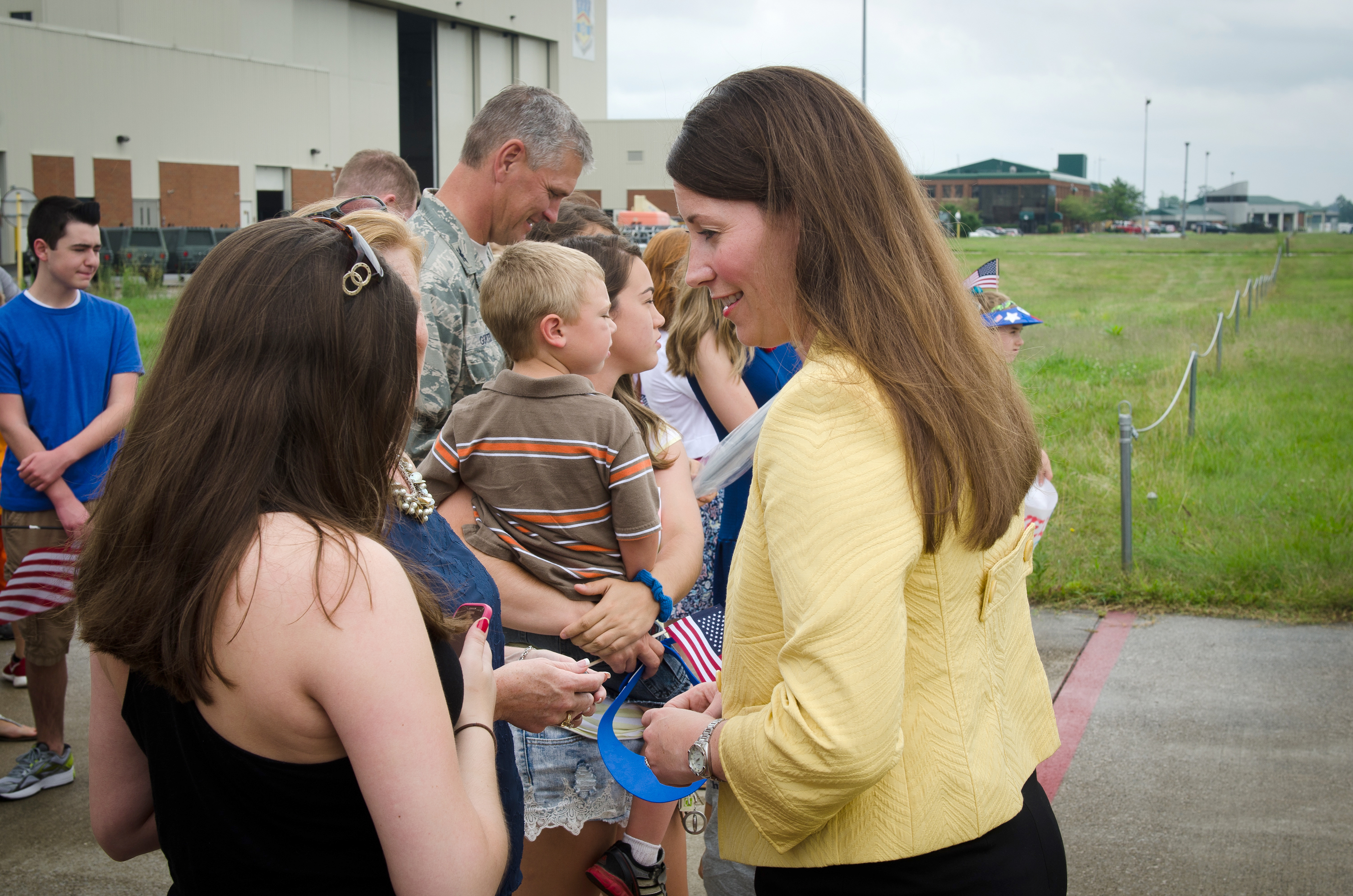
Grimes talks to family members of Airmen from the 123rd Airlift Wing Airmen during a homecoming ceremony at the Kentucky Air National Guard Base in Louisville, Kentucky.

In 2010, Grimes announced her candidacy for the office of Secretary of State of Kentucky, left open by term-limited incumbent Republican Trey Grayson.

When Grayson resigned to accept a position at the Harvard Institute of Politics, Governor Steve Beshear appointed Bowling Green mayor Elaine Walker over Grimes to fill the rest of Grayson's term in office. Despite this, Grimes stayed in the race and defeated Walker by a double-digit margin in the May primary.

Grimes faced Republican businessman and former Senate candidate Bill Johnson in the general election. A main aspect of the campaign was Grimes's opposition to Johnson's proposal to require photo IDs in order to vote. Grimes argued this would take away voting rights from the homeless among others. She said her goals when elected included "updating business and election laws, increasing voting access for veterans and protecting the identity of domestic-violence victims in registration records." She became well known through commercials that showed her elderly grandmothers. Grimes defeated Johnson with over 60% of the vote. She received a higher percentage of the vote than any other Kentucky statewide Democratic candidate during the 2011 elections. Her term as Secretary of State began on January 2, 2012.

In 2012, Grimes visited the Middle East to observe the voting process of overseas military personnel. This experience led her to become an advocate of an improved voting process for the U.S. military. Grimes's recommendations received bipartisan support in the Kentucky General Assembly and were signed into law in April 2013. The Kentucky Military Heroes Voting Initiative law allows military members and other covered voters to register to vote and update their registration online, ensures that military voters have sufficient time to vote in special elections, and extends existing protections to state and local elections and National Guard members.

On March 14, 2016, Grimes launched the online voter registration system GoVoteKY.com. A statewide voter registration drive she led during the 2016 presidential election resulted in more than 100,000 new voters. Grimes continues to push for introducing in-person early voting in Kentucky elections. Kentucky is among a handful of states which do not allow voters to cast ballots in person without an excuse before election day.

In November 2017, Grimes announced the formation of a task force for legalizing the medical use of cannabis in Kentucky. In January 2018, House Bill 166 was introduced which incorporated the recommendations of the task force. In March 2018, Grimes coauthored an op-ed with Medal of Honor recipient Dakota Meyer calling for passage of the bill. The bill stalled, however, which Grimes blamed on Republican leadership "holding the bill hostage".

Grimes is an advocate for the restoration of voting rights for Kentucky's non-violent felons who have served their sentences. Kentucky remains one of three states which does not automatically restore voting rights to felons who have completed their sentences.

Grimes has been a proponent of legislation and initiatives to aid individuals with disabilities, including working with Kentucky agencies to help educate disabled voters about their rights at the ballot box and advocating for a law that improves communication between law enforcement and the more than 700,000 Kentuckians who are deaf or hard of hearing.

Grimes has been criticized for controlling the Secretary of State office and the State Board of Elections's day-to-day functions, among other controversies. Her extensive oversight, including have representatives from the SOS office present during interviews of the SBE members making claims in the investigations of the controversies, has been described as intimidating to those in the SBE.

== 2014 U.S. Senate campaign ==
In a July 1, 2013, press conference, Grimes announced her intentions to run for the United States Senate seat held by Mitch McConnell. Grimes officially launched the campaign with a kick-off rally on July 30, 2013, and officially filed her paperwork to be on the Kentucky ballot in January 2014.

On May 20, 2014, she won the Democratic primary with 77% of the vote. She faced Senate minority leader Mitch McConnell in the general election on November 4, 2014, and lost despite that the race was initially considered to be competitive by both the Cook Political Report and the Rothenberg Political Report, which considered the race only to lean Republican."

In April 2014, Grimes attended a Chicago meeting of the Democracy Alliance, a group of liberal donors who pool their resources in support of progressive causes, where she was a featured speaker at the event.

Hollywood executives Harvey Weinstein and Jeffrey Katzenberg hosted fundraising events for Grimes in New York City and Beverly Hills. Her father's involvement in the campaign was noted as a factor in the race due to his political and fundraising connections.

Grimes and McConnell disagreed over debate proposals; McConnell preferred a series of Lincoln-Douglas style debates with only candidates asking questions and no audience, while Grimes said she wants members of the audience to ask questions. They ultimately had a single debate, aired October 13 on KET; host Bill Goodwin posed the questions and also relayed questions from viewers.

On October 26, Grimes received endorsements from the editorial boards of The Courier-Journal and The Lexington Herald-Leader. On November 4, McConnell defeated Grimes, 56.2% to 40.7%, to win re-election. After her defeat to Sen. McConnell, a federal grand jury indicted Grimes's father, Gerald G. Lundergan, and Democratic operative, Dale C. Emmons, on charges of using corporate funds for her campaign and then conspiring to cover them up.

== 2015 reelection campaign ==
After her defeat in the 2014 elections for the US Senate, Grimes was speculated as a candidate for re-election to office of Secretary of State of Kentucky, for Governor of Kentucky and for Attorney General of Kentucky, but in January 2015 she announced her plans to run for re-election as Secretary of State. On November 3, 2015, Grimes won re-election with 51% of the vote.

== Political positions ==
Grimes said she would vote to delay the employer mandate for small businesses in the Affordable Care Act, but supports the act's goals of increasing coverage. She has criticized Mitch McConnell's votes to defund the act on the grounds that doing so would "destroy Kynect," Kentucky's state-based insurance exchange.

In November 2013, Grimes claimed that as a member of the National Rifle Association of America, her "strong support for the Second Amendment is unquestioned" and added that she was "proud of Kentucky's long-held gun ownership, sporting and hunting traditions", inviting McConnell to go shooting with her.

Grimes has said that she is "pro-choice down the line on abortion" and opposes efforts to prohibit abortion after 20 weeks. She explained "I come from a family of five women. I would never pretend to tell one of my sisters what to do with their body and I don't want the federal government doing that either.… When it comes to choice, I believe, should a woman have to make that decision, it's between herself, her doctor, and her God."

Grimes supports Israel's Iron Dome missile defense system. She also supports reducing taxes for businesses that provide child care to their employees, has called for pay equity for female employees and expressed her desire to increase the federal minimum wage.

Grimes opposes further EPA rules on powerplant emissions, claiming they will result in job losses in Kentucky's coal industry.

== Electoral history ==
2011 Kentucky Secretary of State Democratic primary results
Party	Candidate	Votes	%
Democratic	Alison Lundergan Grimes	85,436	55.26
Democratic	Elaine Walker (Incumbent)	69,185	44.74
Total votes		154,621	100

2011 Kentucky Secretary of State general election results
Party	Candidate	Votes	%
Democratic	Alison Lundergan Grimes	494,368	60.63
Republican	Bill Johnson	321,065	39.37
Total votes		815,433	100

2014 U.S. Senate Democratic primary results
Party	Candidate	Votes	%
Democratic	Alison Lundergan Grimes	307,821	76.47
Democratic	Gregory Brent Leichty	32,602	8.10
Democratic	Burrel Charles Farnsley	32,310	8.03
Democratic	Tom Recktenwald	29,791	7.40
Total votes		402,524	100

2014 U.S. Senate general election results
Party	Candidate	Votes	%
Republican	Mitch McConnell (incumbent)	806,787	56.19
Democratic	Alison Lundergan Grimes	584,698	40.72
Libertarian	David Patterson	44,240	3.08
Write-ins	Write-ins	143	0.01
Total votes		1,435,868	100

2015 Kentucky Secretary of State Democratic primary election results
Party	Candidate	Votes	%
Democratic	Alison Lundergan Grimes (incumbent)	131,654	73.24
Democratic	Charles Lovett	48,096	26.76
Total votes			

2015 Kentucky Secretary of State general election results
Party	Candidate	Votes	%
Democratic	Alison Lundergan Grimes (Incumbent)	493,600	51.16
Republican	Steve Knipper	471,239	48.84
Total votes		964,839	100

== Personal life ==
Married since September 2, 2006, she and her husband, Andrew Grimes, live in downtown Lexington. On July 23, 2018, Grimes announced her pregnancy on Twitter and that she and her husband were expecting their first child, a boy, in December. She gave birth to a son on December 26, 2018. This made Grimes the second statewide officeholder to give birth while in office; the first was Kentucky state treasurer Allison Ball in July 2018. On August 8, 2020, Grimes welcomed her second child, a daughter. On February 20, 2022, Grimes welcomed her third child, another daughter.

Party political offices
Preceded by Bruce Hendrickson	Democratic nominee for Secretary of State of Kentucky; 2011, 2015	Succeeded by Heather French Henry
Preceded by Bruce Lunsford	Democratic nominee for U.S. Senator from Kentucky (Class 2); 2014	Succeeded by Amy McGrath
Political offices
Preceded by Elaine Walker	Secretary of State of Kentucky; 2012–2020	Succeeded by Michael Adams
