= Richard Weisenberger =

American politician

Member of the Kentucky Senate from the 1st district
- In office January 1, 1976 – September 30, 1981
- Preceded by: Carroll Hubbard
- Succeeded by: Greg Higdon

Personal details
- Born: April 18, 1938
- Died: July 29, 1995 (aged 57)
- Party: Democratic

Richard Glenn Weisenberger (April 18, 1938 – July 29, 1995) was an American politician from Kentucky who was a member of the Kentucky Senate from 1976 to 1981. Weisenberger was first elected in 1975; his predecessor, Carroll Hubbard, had been elected to congress in 1974. Weisenberger resigned from the senate in September 1981 in order to run for Commonwealth's Attorney.

Weisenberger served as Commonwealth's Attorney until his death in July 1995.
