= Tony Curtsinger =

American politician (born 1941)

Member of the Kentucky House of Representatives from the 76th district
- In office January 5, 1990 – January 1, 1991
- Preceded by: Jerry Lundergan
- Succeeded by: Ruth Ann Palumbo

Personal details
- Born: March 31, 1939
- Died: April 11, 2021 (aged 82)
- Party: Republican

Tony E. Curtsinger (March 31, 1939 – April 11, 2021) is an American politician from Kentucky who was a member of the Kentucky House of Representatives from 1990 to 1991. Curtsinger was elected to the house in a December 1989 special election following the resignation of incumbent representative Jerry Lundergan. He was defeated for reelection in 1990 by Democratic candidate Ruth Ann Palumbo.

He died in April 2021 at age 82.
