= Carroll Hubbard =

American politician (1937–2022)

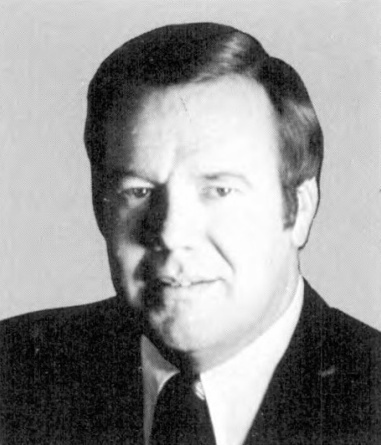
- Official portrait, 1991

Member of the U.S. House of Representatives from Kentucky's 1st district
- In office January 3, 1975 – January 3, 1993
- Preceded by: Frank Stubblefield
- Succeeded by: Thomas Barlow

Member of the Kentucky Senate from the 1st district
- In office January 1, 1968 – January 3, 1975
- Preceded by: George G. Brand
- Succeeded by: Richard Weisenberger

Personal details
- Born: July 7, 1937 Murray, Kentucky, U.S.
- Died: November 12, 2022 (aged 85) Paducah, Kentucky, U.S.
- Party: Democratic (before 2019); Republican (after 2019)
- Spouses: Carol Brown; Wilda Hubbard
- Children: 2
- Education: Georgetown College (BA); University of Louisville (JD)

Military service
- Years of service: 1962–1967 (Air); 1968–1970 (Army)
- Unit: Kentucky Air National Guard; Kentucky Army National Guard

Carroll Hubbard Jr. (July 7, 1937 – November 12, 2022) was an American politician and attorney from Kentucky. He began his political career in the Kentucky Senate, and was elected to the United States House of Representatives in 1974. He served until he was defeated in 1992, after becoming embroiled in the House banking scandal, and ultimately spent two years in prison. After being released, Hubbard ran unsuccessfully for the Kentucky General Assembly on four occasions.

Hubbard was a Democrat during his time in elected office, but he switched to the Republican Party in the last years of his life.

== Education and military service ==
Hubbard was born on July 7, 1937, in Murray, Kentucky, to Dr. Carroll Hubbard Sr., a Baptist minister, and Beth Hubbard, an elementary school teacher. The family moved several times during his youth, including to Beaver Dam, Kentucky and then Ashland, Kentucky. In 1953, the family moved to Louisville, Kentucky, when his father became pastor of St. Matthews Baptist Church. In Louisville, Mr. Hubbard attended Eastern High School and graduated in 1955.

After high school, Hubbard attended Georgetown College in Georgetown, Kentucky. At Georgetown, he was editor-in-chief of The Georgetonian, a weekly college newspaper. He was a member of the Kappa Alpha Order and served as its President of the fraternity during his senior year. During his senior year at Georgetown, Hubbard was selected as “Mr. Georgetonian.”

After graduating from Georgetown College with a degree in sociology in 1959, Hubbard attended the University of Louisville Law School, where he received a full scholarship. In 1966, Hubbard was married to Joyce Lynn Hall, of Metropolis, Illinois, with whom he had two daughters, Kelly Lynn and Krista Leigh. Their divorce was finalized in 1983.

In 1967, he was elected to serve in the Kentucky Senate, defeating incumbent senator George Brand in the Democratic primary. On June 15, 1972, Hubbard was one of seven Democratic senators that voted against Kentucky's ratification of the Equal Rights Amendment. He graduated from the United States Air Force School of Aerospace Medicine at Brooks Air Force Base in Texas in November 1962 and served in the Kentucky Air National Guard from 1962 to 1967, where he became a captain. He also served in the Kentucky Army National Guard from 1968 to 1970, where he became a captain. He moved to Mayfield, Kentucky where he practiced law for several years.

== U.S. House of Representatives ==
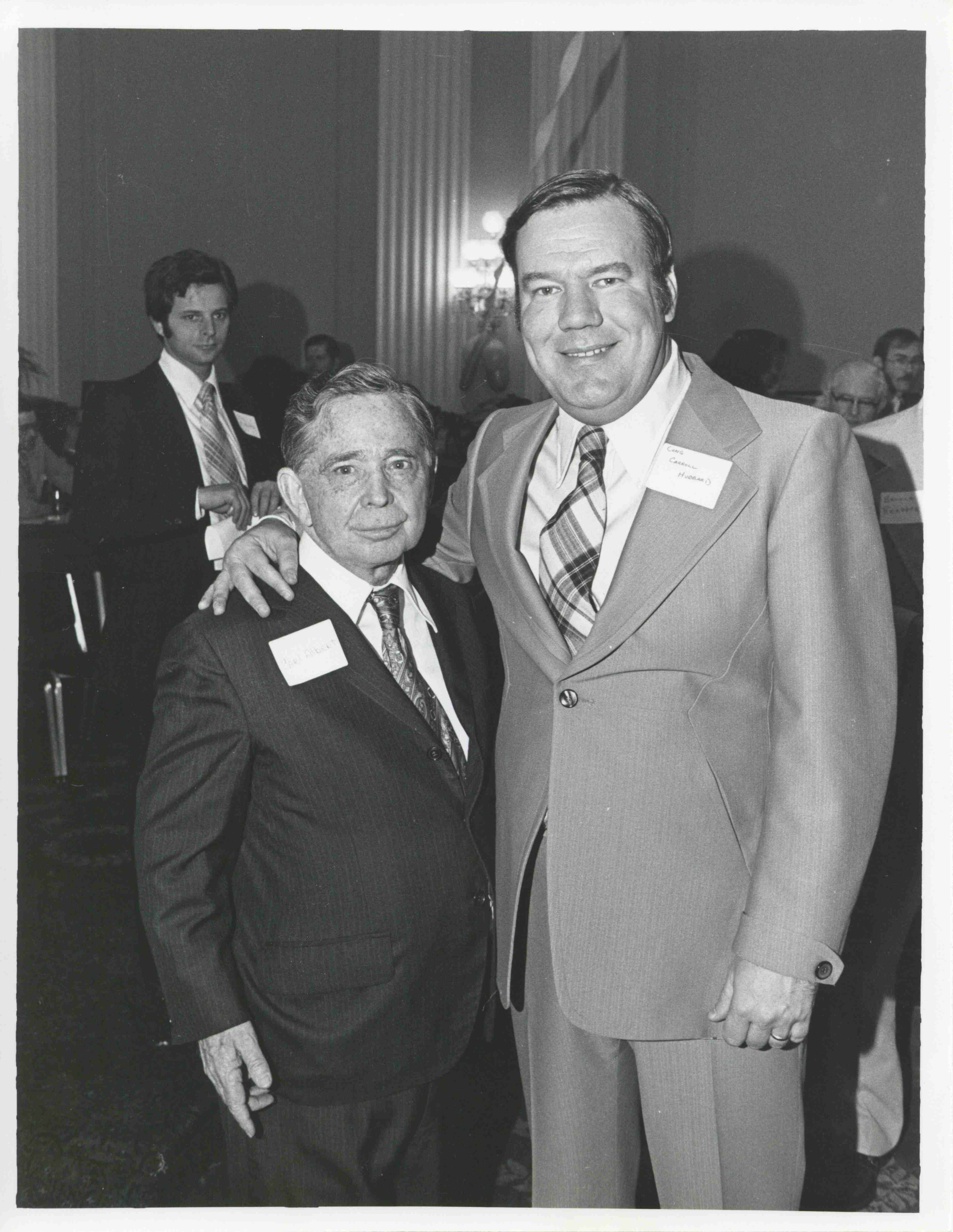
Speaker of the House Carl Albert (left) with Hubbard (right) in 1976.

In May 1974, Hubbard, then a state senator, defeated incumbent Congressman Frank Stubblefield in the Democratic primary to represent Kentucky's 1st congressional district in the United States Congress. He won the general election in November 1974 and began serving in Congress in January 1975.

As one of 75 freshmen members of the 94th Congress, Hubbard was elected as president of this large freshman class of new U.S. representatives. Hubbard was re-elected to Congress eight times.

While in Congress, Hubbard was a member of the House Banking, Finance and Urban Affairs Committee and House Merchant Marine and Fisheries Committee. In addition to his Washington, D.C. office in the Rayburn House Office Building, Hubbard maintained district offices in Henderson, Hopkinsville, Madisonville and Paducah, Kentucky; nearly every weekend he travelled from Washington back to the district, where he participated in hundreds of community meetings and events, gave countless speeches, and shook an immeasurable number of hands.

Correspondence with the district's constituents also took up much of Hubbard's time during his days in Congress. In this era before e-mail and social media, Hubbard personally signed and sent literally hundreds of thousands of letters, newsletters, calendars and Christmas cards to the citizens of western Kentucky.

Hubbard served in Congress for 18 years, during which he mounted an unsuccessful primary challenge for governor in 1979.

In 1983, Hubbard was invited to South Korea to attend a celebration of the 30th anniversary of the United States–South Korea Mutual Defense Treaty with fellow Congressman Larry McDonald and Senator Jesse Helms. Hubbard and Helms planned to join McDonald on Korean Air Lines Flight 007. However, Helms and Hubbard both experienced delays in their travel plans; both cancelled at the last minute and Hubbard accepted a Kentucky speaking engagement. The flight was shot down by the Soviet Union, killing all aboard including McDonald.

=== Rubbergate ===
Hubbard lost the 1992 Democratic primary to Tom Barlow--who went on to win the general election--after becoming one of a number of representatives embroiled in the "Rubbergate" House banking scandal. After pleading guilty to violations of federal campaign finance laws, Hubbard served two years in prison from 1995 to 1997. His wife Carol Brown Hubbard was convicted of using her husband's congressional aides to work on her failed campaign for Congress. She was sentenced to five years' probation.

Hubbard served as an FBI informant, codenamed Elmer Fudd, in an attempt to reduce his sentence. He was disbarred because of his conviction but was reinstated by the Kentucky Supreme Court in 2001 because of his "good moral character", despite the Kentucky Bar Association's board of governors voting unanimously against reinstatement.

== Later career ==
In 2019, while working on a case, Hubbard mailed a photograph of the opposing counsel and her wife with a homophobic slur written on it. The fallout from that incident resulted in five counts of misconduct including lying under oath about the incident. The Kentucky Supreme Court suspended him from the practice of law for sixty days. Later that year, Hubbard was found to be practicing law without a license as he had failed to complete the continuing education credits associated with the suspension. Hubbard was ultimately permanently disbarred as a consequence of the incident, becoming the third lawyer in Kentucky history to be disbarred more than once.

=== Post-congressional campaigns ===
In 2006 and 2008, Hubbard was unsuccessful in attempts to seek election to the Kentucky Senate. He lost by 58 votes in the 2006 race. He mounted a third and final unsuccessful bid in 2012.

Hubbard announced in 2019 that he was changing his party affiliation to Republican, expressing disagreement with "ultra liberal" positions in the Democratic Party.

In January 2020, he filed to run for the Kentucky House of Representatives against Republican incumbent Steven Rudy. Hubbard lost the primary to Rudy by a wide margin. Rudy subsequently faced Democratic candidate Corbin Snardon in the general election.

== Personal life and death ==
Hubbard was married twice and had two daughters. He died at a nursing home in Paducah, Kentucky, on November 12, 2022, at age 85.

== See also ==
- List of American federal politicians convicted of crimes
- List of federal political scandals in the United States

U.S. House of Representatives
Preceded by Frank Stubblefield	Member of the U.S. House of Representatives from Kentucky's 1st congressional district 1975–1993	Succeeded by Thomas Barlow
