= List of mayors of Bowling Green, Kentucky =

The following is a list of mayors of the city of Bowling Green, Kentucky, United States.

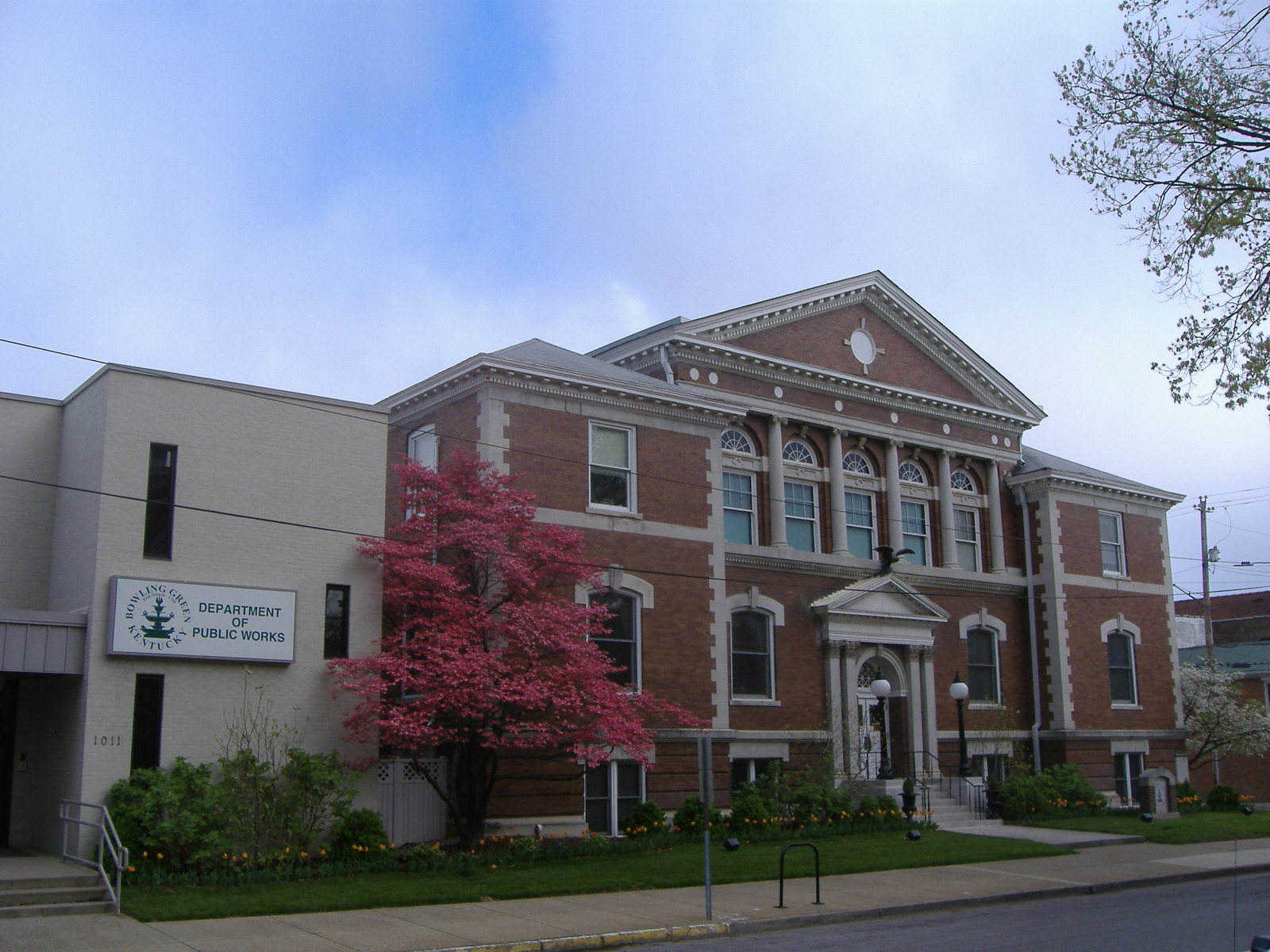
City hall building in Bowling Green, Kentucky (photo 2008)

- Thomas B. Wright, 1870–1871
- John C. Underwood, 1871–1872
- Henry C. Hines, 1872–1874, 1880–1884
- John H. Mallory, 1874–1880, 1892–1898, 1902–1903
- Henry E. Jenkins, 1884–1888
- Thomas J. Smith, 1888–1891
- James K. Forbes, 1891–1892
- Gilson E. Townsend, 1898–1902, 1909–1913
- Frank L. Kister Sr., 1903
- George T. Wilson, 1903–1909
- A.Y. Patterson, 1913–1917
- William H. Jones, 1917–1921
- Henry E. Stone, 1921–1925
- A. Scott Hines, 1925–1929, 1941–1942
- John B. Rodes, 1929–1933
- B.S. Rutherford, 1933–1937
- Thomas B. Callis, 1937–1941
- Gaston W. Cole, 1942–1945
- D.D. Spenser, 1945–1947
- Henry J. Potter, 1947–1949
- Elvis R. Campbell, 1949–1953
- Clifton Wallace Lampkin, 1953–1959
- Robert D. Graham, 1959–1963, 1968–1971
- James H. Topmiller, 1964
- Walter F. Weis, 1964–1965
- Robert E. Petrie, 1965–1967
- Spero G. Kereiakes, 1972–1976
- B.L. "Bernie" Steen, 1976–1979
- Harold Asher Miller, 1980–1983
- Charles A. Hardcastle, 1984–1987
- Patsy Sloan, 1988–1991
- Johnny D. Webb, 1992–1995
- Eldon J. Renaud, 1996–2000
- Sandy Jones, 2001–2004
- Elaine Walker, 2005–2011
- Joe Denning, 2011
- Bruce Wilkerson, 2011–2020
- Alex Compton, 2021–present

== See also ==
- Bowling Green history
