= Jerry Lundergan =

American politician

Member of the Kentucky House of Representatives from the 76th district
- In office January 1, 1987 – December 13, 1989
- Preceded by: Margaret J. Stewart
- Succeeded by: Tony Curtsinger
- In office January 1, 1980 – January 1, 1985
- Preceded by: Steve Beshear
- Succeeded by: Margaret J. Stewart

Personal details
- Born: 1946 or 1947 (age 79–80)
- Party: Democratic
- Relations: Alison Lundergan Grimes (daughter)
- Education: University of Kentucky

Gerald G. Lundergan (born 1946 or 1947) is an American businessman, politician and member of the Democratic Party from the Commonwealth of Kentucky. He served in the Kentucky House of Representatives from 1980 to 1985 and 1987 to 1989 and has served as Chairman of the Kentucky Democratic Party on two occasions. In September 2019, he was convicted in federal court of providing illegal corporate campaign contributions to his daughter, then Secretary of State of Kentucky Alison Lundergan Grimes’ unsuccessful 2014 United States Senate campaign. Lundergan was pardoned by President Joe Biden in 2025.

== Early life ==
Lundergan is from Maysville, Kentucky. He is the oldest of five children. His father sold chicken and pork chops at state fairs. His father died at age 45, when he was 18 years old. His mother took a job as a clerk for the sheriff, while Jerry and his siblings continued to sell food.

Lundergan graduated from the University of Kentucky and then worked as a staffer to U.S. Representative John B. Breckinridge. Lundergan and his brother turned their food business into Lundy's, a catering company, in 1977.

== Career ==
Lundergan challenged Steve Beshear, a member of the Kentucky House of Representatives, in the Democratic Party primary election in 1975. With about 2,700 votes cast in the election, Beshear defeated Lundergan by 202 votes. Lundergan ran against Beshear again in 1977. With over 4,100 total votes, Beshear defeated Lundergan by 412. In 1979, Beshear ran for Attorney General of Kentucky and Lundergan won his seat unopposed. Lundergan became friends with fellow freshman legislator Greg Stumbo. He was easily re-elected in 1981 and ran for Kentucky Auditor of Public Accounts in 1983 after Democratic incumbent James B. Graham ran for Kentucky Superintendent of Public Instruction. Lundergan lost the primary election to Mary Ann Tobin by 143,836 votes (38.94%) to 77,419 (20.96%). Tobin went on to win the general election.

Lundergan ran for re-election to the State House in 1984, state legislative elections having been moved from odd-numbered years to even-numbered years. During the Democratic primary campaign, which the Lexington Herald-Leader described as "bitter", Lundergan's main opponent, attorney and first-time candidate Shirley Allen Cunningham, accused his campaign of voter intimidation and possibly violating the civil rights of some black voters. Lundergan lost the primary election to Cunningham by 27 votes out of 2,941 cast. Cunningham went on to lose the general election to Republican Margaret J. Stewart.

Lundergan made a comeback in 1986, winning the Democratic primary against Eleanor H. Leonard and then unseating Stewart in the general election by 4,617 votes (54.7%) to 3,823 (45.3%).

Lundergan supported Wallace Wilkinson's campaign for Governor of Kentucky in the 1987 election. Lundergan briefly served as Chairman of the Kentucky Democratic Party during Wilkinson's administration. Ten weeks into his service, Lundergan was found to have accepted a no-bid contract worth $153,998 to cater a state event. At Wilkinson's request, he stepped down as party chair on August 22, 1988. In his 1988 re-election bid, Lundergan was challenged by Cunningham again in the Democratic primary but this time he easily defeated him, by 2,826 votes (62.37%) to 1,630 (35.97%). In the general election, Lundergan initially faced no Republican opposition but after news of his being charged with ethics violations, he was challenged by two write-in opponents, Steve Carson and Jerry Kuykendall. Carson and Kuykendall split the anti-Lundergan and he narrowly triumphed, by 3,636 votes (44.31%) to Carson's 3,008 (36.66%) and Kuykendall's 1,420 (17.30%).

On December 12, 1989, Lundergan was convicted of a felony charge of improperly using his political influence, but acquitted of theft. The prosecution asked that he be given jail time, to send a message about ethical violations, but the jury recommended the maximum fine of $1,000. He resigned his seat in the State House the next day. The conviction was later thrown out by an appeals court, which determined that Lundergan should have been charged with a misdemeanor rather than a felony. In the resulting special election for his seat, Cunningham ran as an Independent candidate and split the Democratic vote with Democratic nominee Rick L. Thomas, allowing Republican Tony Curtsinger to win the seat with 1,430 votes (38.95%) to Cunningham's 1,326 (36.12%) and Thomas' 657 (17.90%).

Curtsinger went on to lose the regularly scheduled election to Democrat Ruth Ann Palumbo, who held the seat until 2025. Lundergan has made numerous attempts to regain his old seat, challenging Palumbo in the Democratic primary in 1994, 1996, 1998 and 2000, each time losing by at least 10 points.

After the Democrats suffered defeats in the 2003 state elections, Stumbo, the highest ranking Kentucky Democrat as state Attorney General, asked Lundergan to again chair the state party. Kentucky Democrats elected Lundergan their party chair in January 2005.

Lundergan served as the state chair for Hillary Clinton's 2008 presidential campaign.

In 2019, Lundergan was convicted for making illegal campaign contributions to his daughter in her 2014 U.S. Senate race against incumbent Republican U.S. Senator Mitch McConnell.

On July 16, 2020, Lundergan was sentenced to 21 months in prison followed by two years of supervised release for his role in orchestrating a multi-year scheme to funnel more than $200,000 in secret, unlawful corporate contributions into a campaign for United States Senate and for causing the concealment of those contributions from the Federal Election Commission (FEC). Lundergan was specifically convicted of one count of conspiracy, one count of making corporate campaign contributions, four counts of causing the submission of false statements to the FEC, and four counts of causing the falsification of documents with the intent to obstruct and impede a matter within the FEC's jurisdiction. According to the evidence presented at trial, Lundergan used the funds of S.R. Holding Company Inc. (S.R. Holding), a company he owned, to pay for services provided by consultants and vendors to a campaign for a U.S. Senate seat in the 2014 election cycle. The candidate for this seat was Lundergan's daughter, Alison Lundergan Grimes. The evidence established that Lundergan caused the issuance of a number of payments from S.R. Holding funds for services that included audio-video production, lighting, recorded telephone calls and campaign consulting, between July 2013 and December 2015. The corporate contributions also included monthly payments from S.R. Holding to co-conspirator Dale C. Emmons and his company during this period. Emmons provided services to the campaign and sought and received compensation from Lundergan and S.R. Holding. Emmons also used the funds of his corporation, Emmons & Company Inc., to pay other vendors and a campaign worker for services rendered to the campaign. Those services included recorded telephone calls, technological support services, and other campaign-related expenses.

== Pardon by President Biden ==
Full and Unconditional Pardon granted by President Biden

On January 19, 2025, President Joe Biden granted Lundergan a full and unconditional pardon which was announced by the White House on January 20, 2025.

== Personal life ==
Lundergan and his wife, Charlotte, met in high school. They have five daughters. One of their daughters, Alison Lundergan Grimes, was the Secretary of State of Kentucky from 2012 to 2020, and was the Democratic Party's 2014 nominee for the United States Senate seat held by Mitch McConnell in the 2014 election.

Lundergan resides in Lexington, Kentucky. He is a devout Catholic, attending Mass every day.
