= Joe Denning =

Joe William Denning (born 1945) is an American mayor, City commissioner, and police officer who served as the first African-American mayor of Bowling Green, Kentucky.

Born in Bowling Green, Kentucky, Denning is a graduate of the Kentucky State Police Academy, the second Black Trooper in the history of the Kentucky State Police. While serving as a Kentucky State Police trooper, he became the first black ever elected to public office in Bowling Green and Warren County as member of the Bowling Green School Board in 1975. In 1991, Denning became the first black City Commissioner in Bowling Green. In January 2011, Denning served as the pro tem mayor. Denning became mayor within the thirty-day period after the resignation of Elaine Walker who was set to become the Secretary of State for Kentucky.

== See also ==
- List of first African-American mayors
- List of mayors of Bowling Green, Kentucky
