= Lois Combs Weinberg =

American politician

Personal details
- Born: Lois Ann Combs; December 18, 1943 (age 82) Lexington, Kentucky, U.S.
- Party: Democratic
- Children: 3
- Parent: Bert Combs
- Education: Randolph College (BS); Harvard University (MEd)

Lois Ann Combs Weinberg (born December 18, 1943) is an American politician and an advocate for improvements in public education in Kentucky. A native of Eastern Kentucky, Weinberg has served on the University of Kentucky Board of Trustees, the Kentucky Council on Postsecondary Education, and the Kentucky Prichard Committee for Academic Excellence.

In 2002, Weinberg was the Democratic nominee for the United States Senate, losing in a landslide to Republican incumbent Mitch McConnell, 64.7%–35.3%.

== Early life and education ==
Lois Combs Weinberg, the daughter of Bertram T. "Bert" Combs and Mabel Hall Combs, was born on December 18, 1943, in Lexington, Kentucky. Weinberg lived in Frankfort between 1959 and 1963.

Weinberg attended Randolph Macon Women's College and earned a BS in 1965, and a Master of Education from Harvard in 1996. Weinberg married Bill Weinberg and they have three children. After their marriage, the Weinbergs moved to Washington, D.C., for a short time and then moved to Alice Lloyd College. In Washington, she worked at the Office of Economic Opportunity as an evaluator. In 1967, she worked in Lynchburg, West Virginia, on a Community Action Program (CAP).

=== Combs family political influence ===
Her father, an attorney, was first elected to the political office to the position of city attorney in Prestonsburg, Kentucky, in 1950. Later that year, Governor Lawrence Wetherby appointed her father to fill a vacancy in the office of Commonwealth's Attorney for Kentucky's 31st Judicial District. In April 1951, Governor Wetherby appointed Combs to fill a vacancy on the Kentucky Court of Appeals. Later that year, he won a full eight-year term on the court. In 1959, he was elected the 50th Governor of Kentucky. He was appointed to the Sixth Circuit Court of Appeals by President Lyndon B. Johnson, serving from 1967 to 1970.

== Education in Kentucky ==
Motivated by her own son's learning problems, Weinberg became an advocate for children with learning disabilities. In 1979, Weinberg started a group offering tutorial services for children in Eastern region of Kentucky with dyslexia. This eventually lead to a comprehensive program at the Hindman Settlement School. Weinberg was also part of a commission to study the state's future approach to education. She joined the board of the Hindman Settlement School in 1984. Later Weinberg was the executive director of a non-profit organization, the Institute for Dyslexia Education in Appalachia (IDEA). She has served on the University of Kentucky board and the Council on Postsecondary Education. In 1986, she was appointed to the State Board of Education by Governor Martha Layne Collins, however, Weinberg turned the appointment down.

Weinberg is currently on the Board of IDEA: Center for Excellence, a non-profit organization focused on excellence in dyslexic services. She also works as a consultant for IDEA Academy at Carnegie Center for Literacy and Learning in Lexington, Kentucky.

== U.S. Senate election, 2002 ==
In 2002, Weinberg won the Kentucky Democratic Party primary for U.S. Senate against Tom Barlow. She lost to incumbent Mitch McConnell in the November general election, 64.7%–35.3%. A statewide advocacy group, The Women's Network, grew out of her former campaign.

Party political offices
Preceded by Steve Beshear	Democratic nominee for U.S. Senator from Kentucky (Class 2); 2002	Succeeded by Bruce Lunsford
