= National Alliance for Advanced Transportation Battery Cell Manufacture =

The National Alliance for Advanced Transportation Battery Cell Manufacture was formed in December 2008 as an alliance between 14 battery makers and the Argonne National Laboratory to improve the competitiveness of the American battery industry (which is in some respects playing catch-up to the Japanese battery industry) and to expedite the development of advanced lithium ion battery technology. The alliance is modeled after SEMATECH, formed in 1987 by a group of U.S. semiconductor manufacturers with $1 billion in federal funding to build manufacturing plants to compete with Asian competition.

The market for rechargeable lithium-ion batteries is currently too small for any one company to build a plant on its own. By combining resources, and with the help of up to $2 billion from the federal government over the next five years, the hope is to catch up on the lead of Asian manufacturers that now supply the majority of batteries used in hybrid and electric cars.

== Members ==
The alliance's members are: 3M, Johnson Controls-Saft Advanced Power Solutions, ActaCell, All Cell Technologies, Altair Nanotechnologies Inc, Eagle Picher Industries Inc., EnerSys, Envia Systems, FMC Corp, MicroSun Technologies, Mobius Power, SiLyte, Superior Graphite, and Townsend Advanced Energy.
