= Ruth Ann Palumbo =

American politician

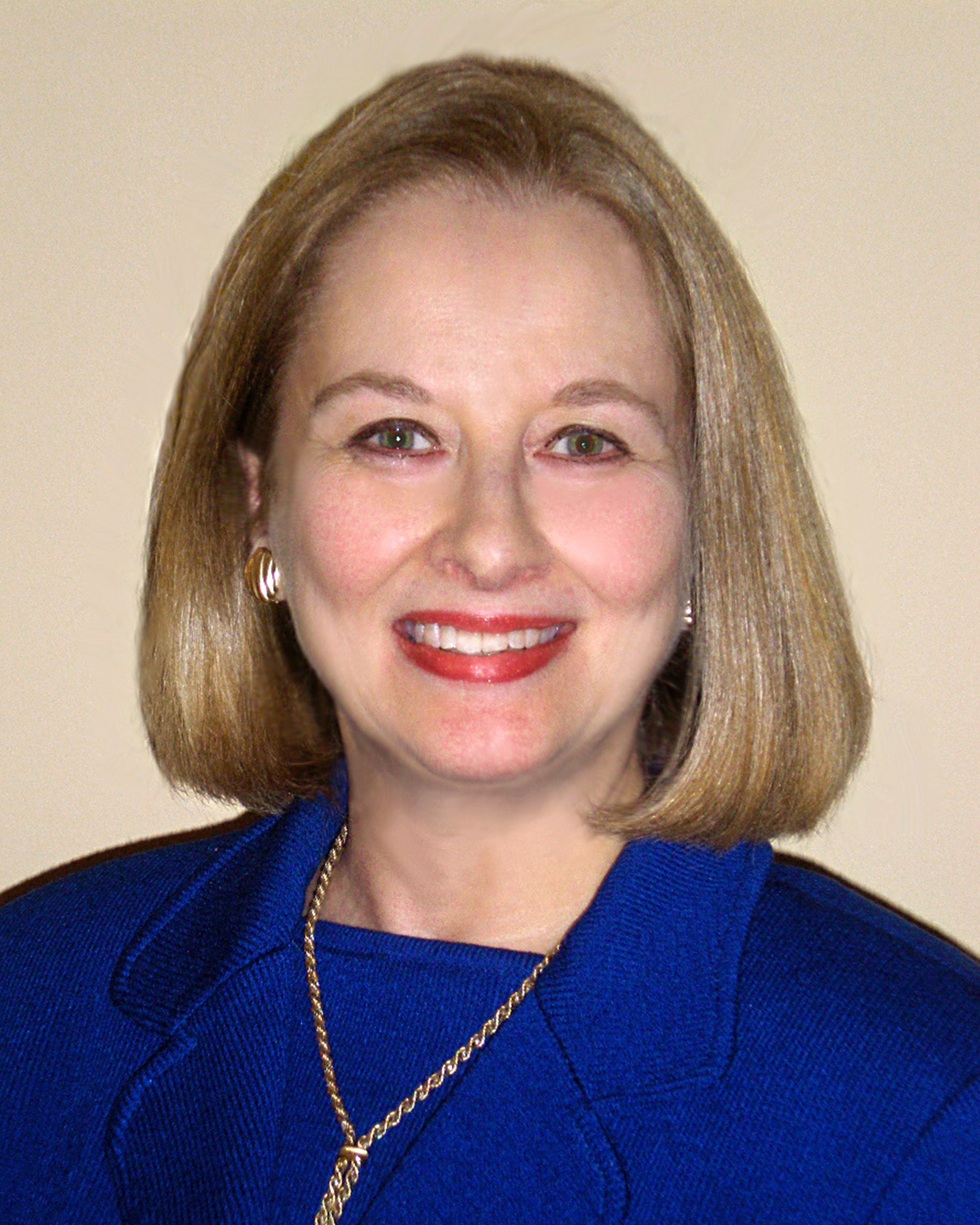

Member of the Kentucky House of Representatives from the 76th district
- In office January 1, 1991 – January 1, 2025
- Preceded by: Tony Curtsinger
- Succeeded by: Anne Donworth

Personal details
- Born: July 7, 1949 (age 77) Lexington, Kentucky, U.S.
- Party: Democratic
- Spouse: John II
- Children: John III (deceased), Joseph, James, and Stephen
- Education: University of Kentucky
- Occupation: Community Volunteer

Ruth Ann Palumbo (born July 7, 1949) is an American politician who represented district 76 in the Kentucky House of Representatives from 1991 to 2025, which covers downtown Lexington, Kentucky and eastern Fayette County. Palumbo is a member of the Kentucky Democratic Party.

Through her career, Palumbo has pushed for legislation concerning "more thorough investigations of child sexual abuse; Kentucky's compliance with the Americans with Disabilities Act [...]; and sponsorship of bills to protect the elderly in nursing homes," as well as bills to do with women's health, mammogram access, and healthcare in general.

Palumbo was first elected to the house in 1990, defeating Republican incumbent Tony Curtsinger. She did not seek reelection in 2024.

== Politics ==
In 1998, Palumbo helped pass the Women's Health Act of 1998, which brought reconstructive mastectomies after breast cancer under coverage of medical insurance, as it previously had been considered cosmetic.

In the 2000s, Palumbo began caucusing with other female legislators (including Joni Jenkins, Susan Johns, Eleanor Jordan, Mary Lou Marzian, Kathy Stein, and more) to track legislation in their individual fields of expertise and work together to affect legislation more easily than they could have done alone. One early victory involved "building statewide opposition to a bill that, before their organized effort, likely would have gone unnoticed and passed easily, [...] removing the requirement that educational institutions offer women's softball as well as men's baseball, violating the spirit if not the letter of Title IX."

In 2011, Palumbo became the longest-serving female member of the body.

During the 2009, 2013, and 2015 legislative sessions, Palumbo chaired the Economic Development Committee. Palumbo has formerly chaired the House's Economic Development and Workforce Investment Committee and co-chaired the Task Force on Economic Development.

On December 21, 2023, Palumbo announced that she would not run for reelection after serving for 33 years. Her son, James "Jamie" Palumbo, was defeated in the 2024 Democratic primary for his mother's seat by Anne Donworth.

== Personal life ==
During her youth, Palumbo thought about becoming a missionary but now considers her political work her mission. She attended Bryan Station High School before earning a Bachelor of Arts in Education from the University of Kentucky in 1972, and served as the President of the Fayette County Young Democrats from 1973 to 1974 and as the Treasurer of the Kentucky Young Democrats the same year. She once received a fellowship from the University of Kentucky, and she was President of the Lexington Philharmonic Women's Guild as well as being a board member of the Interdisciplinary Human Development Institute at the University of Kentucky. In 1988, she participated in Leadership Lexington.

== Awards ==
Palumbo was named Lexington's Outstanding Young Woman in 1982 and received the Governors Volunteer Activist Award in 1989.
