= Greg Higdon =

American politician (born 1947)

Member of the Kentucky Senate from the 1st district
- In office November 1981 – December 23, 1991
- Preceded by: Richard Weisenberger
- Succeeded by: Jeff Green

Personal details
- Born: May 13, 1947 (age 79) Paducah, Kentucky, U.S.
- Party: Democratic
- Education: Brescia College

Charles Gregory Higdon (born May 13, 1947) is an American politician from Kentucky who was a member of the Kentucky Senate from 1981 to 1991. Higdon was first elected in a November 1981 special election following the resignation of incumbent senator Richard Weisenberger. He was then elected to full terms in 1983 and 1988. Higdon resigned in December 1991 to become deputy secretary of the Kentucky Natural Resources Cabinet.

In 2018, Higdon unsuccessfully ran for Judge/Executive of Graves County.

Higdon was born to C.V. and Mabel Higdon in Paducah, Kentucky, and "lived [his] entire life" in Fancy Farm, Kentucky. He earned a degree in business administration from Brescia College in 1969.
