= Steve Beshear =

Governor of Kentucky from 2007 to 2015

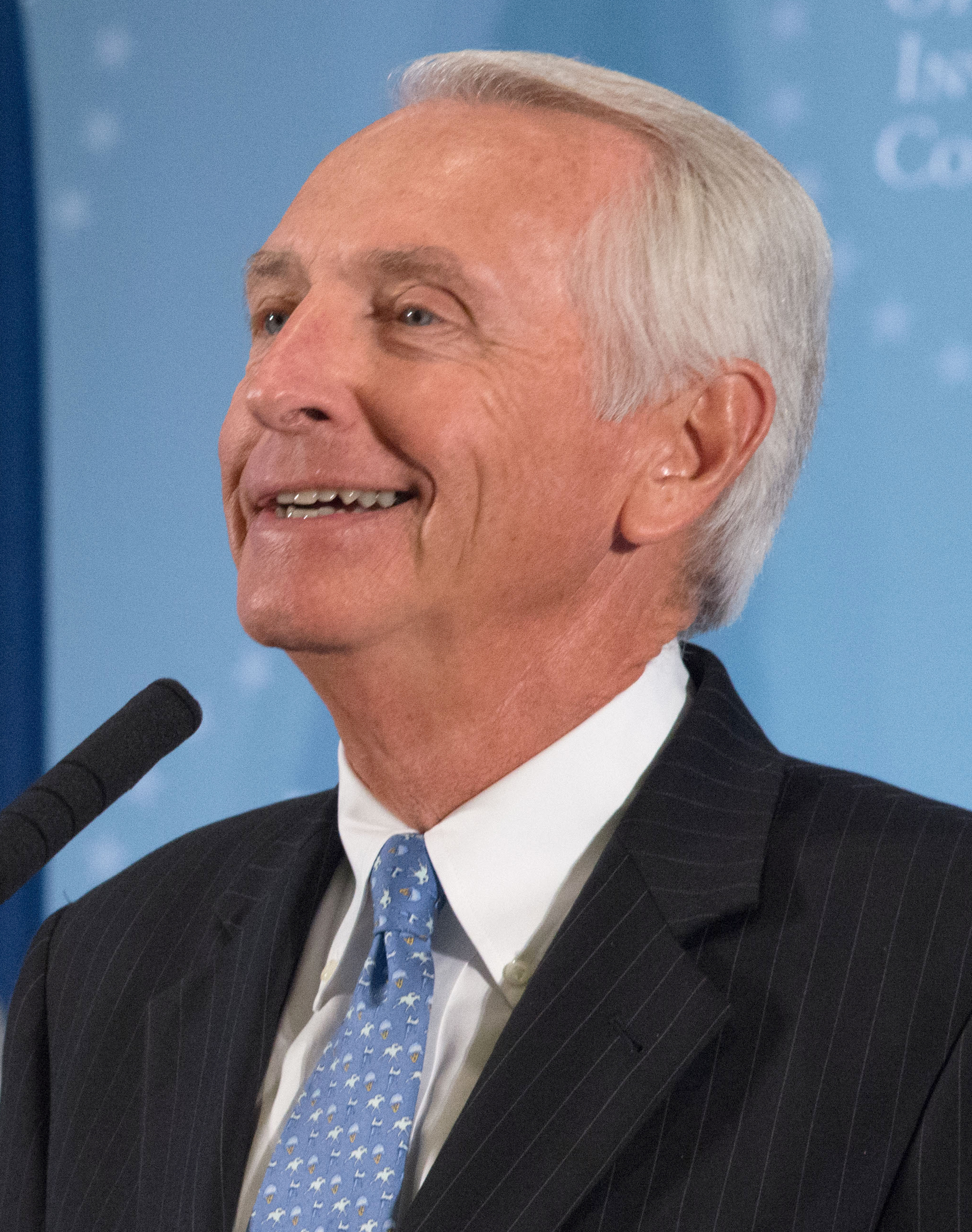
- Kentucky Governor Steve Beshear in 2014

61st Governor of Kentucky
- In office December 11, 2007 – December 8, 2015
- Lieutenant: Daniel Mongiardo; Jerry Abramson; Crit Luallen
- Preceded by: Ernie Fletcher
- Succeeded by: Matt Bevin

49th Lieutenant Governor of Kentucky
- In office December 13, 1983 – December 8, 1987
- Governor: Martha Layne Collins
- Preceded by: Martha Layne Collins
- Succeeded by: Brereton Jones

43rd Attorney General of Kentucky
- In office December 5, 1979 – December 13, 1983; Acting: December 5, 1979 – January 7, 1980
- Governor: John Y. Brown Jr.
- Preceded by: Robert F. Stephens
- Succeeded by: David L. Armstrong

Member of the Kentucky House of Representatives from the 76th district
- In office January 1, 1974 – January 1, 1980
- Preceded by: Bart Peak
- Succeeded by: Jerry Lundergan

Personal details
- Born: Steven Lynn Beshear; September 21, 1944 (age 82) Dawson Springs, Kentucky, U.S.
- Party: Democratic
- Spouse: Jane Klingner (m. 1969)
- Children: 2, including Andy
- Education: University of Kentucky (BA, JD)

Military service
- Branch/service: United States Army; Army Reserve

Steven Lynn Beshear (/bəˈʃɪər/ bə-SHEER; born September 21, 1944) is an American attorney and politician. A member of the Democratic Party, he served as the 61st governor of Kentucky from 2007 to 2015. He served in the Kentucky House of Representatives from 1974 to 1980, was the state's 44th attorney general from 1980 to 1983, and was the 49th lieutenant governor from 1983 to 1987.

After having graduated from the University of Kentucky College of Law in 1968, Beshear briefly practiced law in New York before returning to Kentucky and being elected to the state legislature, where he gained a reputation as a consumer advocate. He parlayed that reputation into a term as attorney general, serving under Governor John Y. Brown Jr. As attorney general, Beshear issued an opinion that copies of the Ten Commandments must be removed from the walls of the state's classrooms in the wake of the U.S. Supreme Court's decision in Stone v. Graham. He also clashed with first lady Phyllis George Brown when he opposed the practice of charging an admission fee for visitors to view the renovated governor's mansion. In the 1983 lieutenant gubernatorial election, Beshear was elected to the administration of Governor Martha Layne Collins. His most significant action in this capacity was the formation of the Kentucky Tomorrow Commission, a panel charged with making recommendations for the future of the state.

Beshear's initial rise to political prominence was interrupted in 1987 when he finished third in a five-candidate Democratic gubernatorial primary election. The Beshear campaign's sparring with that of former governor Brown, the second-place finisher in the primary, opened the door for political novice Wallace Wilkinson's well-financed campaign to achieve a come-from-behind upset in the race. For the next 20 years, Beshear practiced law at a Lexington law firm. His only foray into politics during this period was an unsuccessful challenge to Senator Mitch McConnell in 1996.

In 2007, Beshear was drawn back into politics by the vulnerability of incumbent Republican Governor Ernie Fletcher, whose administration was under extended investigation by then-Attorney General Greg Stumbo, over violations of the state's merit system. In the 2007 gubernatorial election, Beshear emerged from a six-candidate Democratic primary—largely on the strength of his pledge to expand casino gambling as a means of further funding social programs like education—and defeated Fletcher in the general election. Beshear was reelected in 2011, defeating Republican David L. Williams and Gatewood Galbraith, an Independent. He was ineligible for reelection in 2015 due to term limits imposed by the Kentucky Constitution, and was succeeded by Republican Matt Bevin. Bevin lost reelection in 2019 to Beshear's son Andy.

== Early life ==
Steve Beshear was born on September 21, 1944, in Hopkins County, Kentucky. He is the third of five children born to Orlando Russell and Mary Elizabeth (Joiner) Beshear. He was raised in the small town of Dawson Springs, where his father owned a furniture store, operated a funeral home, and served as mayor. His father, grandfather, and uncle were Primitive Baptist lay ministers, and in his childhood years, Beshear attended both his father's church and the Christian Church where his mother was a member. Beshear also accompanied his uncle, Fred Beshear, as he traveled around the county during several races for a seat in the state House of Representatives.

Beshear graduated as valedictorian in a class of 28 at Dawson Springs High School in 1962. He then attended the University of Kentucky, where he earned a Bachelor of Arts degree in history in 1966. He was a member of the Delta Tau Delta social fraternity and the Phi Beta Kappa honor society. He was also elected student body treasurer and from 1964 to 1965 served as student body president. While in college, he attended Lexington Primitive Baptist Church and often had lunch at the home of Harold and Marie Fletcher, whose son Ernie he would eventually challenge for the governorship of Kentucky. In 1968, Beshear graduated with honors from the University of Kentucky College of Law.

The next year, he married Jane Klingner. After the marriage, Beshear joined Crestwood Christian Church, which his wife attended. The couple has two sons, Jeffery Scott Beshear and the 63rd governor of Kentucky (2019–present), Andrew Graham Beshear. Following their marriage, the Beshears moved to New York City, where Steve worked for the Wall Street law firm of White & Case. He also served as an intelligence specialist in the United States Army Reserve, performing some of the duties of a Judge Advocate General.

After two and a half years, the family returned to Kentucky, where Beshear joined the Lexington law firm of Harbison, Kessinger, Lisle, and Bush. He went into practice for himself in 1974. Taking on partners, he formed the law firm of Beshear, Meng, and Green. He led the firm until he was elected attorney general in 1979.

== Early political career ==
In 1973, Beshear began his political career by being elected to represent the 76th District (Fayette County) in the Kentucky House of Representatives. During his first term, his colleagues named him the most outstanding freshman legislator. He was re-elected in 1975 and 1977; both campaigns featured close Democratic primaries between Beshear and Jerry Lundergan.

As a legislator, Beshear gained a reputation as a consumer advocate, and sponsored bills to increase environmental protections and end the practice of commercial bail bonding. In 1974, Beshear voted against a resolution condemning the practice of desegregation busing because it called for changes to the federal constitution. One of his major accomplishments in the House was spearheading legislation to improve neonatal care at the University of Kentucky Medical Center. Although he considered a 1978 bill requiring the posting of the Ten Commandments in Kentucky classrooms to be unconstitutional, he abstained from voting on it rather than voting against it, a move he later claimed he regretted.

=== Attorney General ===
Beshear was the first candidate to announce his bid for the post of Attorney General of Kentucky in the 1979 election. Shortly after declaring his candidacy, he was endorsed by outgoing Attorney General Robert F. Stephens. The central issue of Beshear's campaign was his pledge to be an advocate of the consumer in cases of proposed utility rate hikes. After winning the Democratic primary, he defeated Republican nominee Ron Snyder by a vote of 471,177 to 302,951. When incumbent attorney general Stephens resigned in December 1979 to accept an appointment to the Kentucky Supreme Court, Beshear was appointed to fill the vacancy until his term officially began in January. As attorney general, Beshear created the state's first Medicaid fraud division, and his office took a leading role in the Leviticus Project, an eight-state coalition committed to prosecuting organized crime in the country's coal fields.

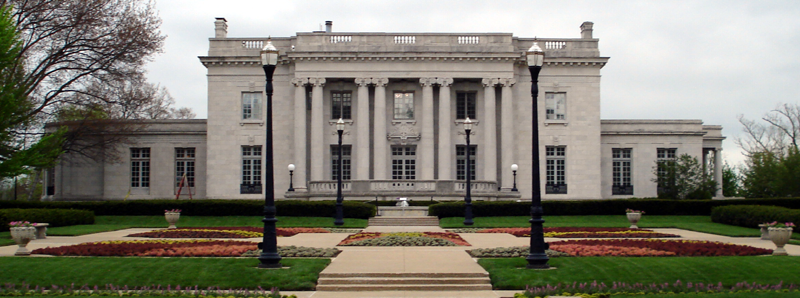
Beshear objected to the Save the Mansion Fund charging a fee to tour the Governor's Mansion.

Two minor controversies marked Beshear's tenure as attorney general. The first came in the aftermath of the U.S. Supreme Court's ruling in the 1980 case of Stone v. Graham. The ruling struck down the state law requiring the posting of the Ten Commandments in all of the state's classrooms on grounds that it violated the Establishment Clause of the federal constitution. State Superintendent Raymond Barber asked the Supreme Court to clarify whether its ruling meant that all of the copies of the Commandments already posted had to be taken down or whether it simply invalidated the Kentucky requirement for them to be posted; the Court refused the request for clarification. Beshear then issued an advisory opinion that displaying the Commandments in classrooms under any circumstances was banned by the Court's ruling.

The second controversy arose as a result of the renovation of the governor's mansion. Phyllis George Brown, Kentucky's first lady, created the Save the Mansion Fund to help cover the costs of the renovation. When the renovation was complete, she planned a nine-day showcase of the mansion for the general public. Guests were charged $10 to take a tour of the mansion. Legislator Eugene P. Stuart objected to taxpayers being charged a fee to view a mansion their tax dollars supported. He asked Beshear to protest the charge, and Beshear requested an injunction against the Save the Mansion Fund. A Lexington judge refused to grant the injunction, and Beshear appealed to the Kentucky Court of Appeals, which upheld the lower court's decision. Beshear's actions caused a rift between him and Governor John Y. Brown Jr.

=== Lieutenant governor ===
Limited to one term as attorney general by the state constitution, Beshear declared his candidacy for lieutenant governor in 1983. In a seven-candidate Democratic primary in May, Beshear captured 183,662 of the 575,022 votes cast to defeat a field that included former state Auditor George L. Atkins, Jefferson County judge executive Todd Hollenbach, Agriculture Commissioner Alben Barkley II, and former Kentucky Wildcats basketball star Bill Spivey. In the general election, Beshear faced Republican Eugene Stuart and Don Wiggins, who became the nominee of the newly formed Consumers Lobby Party after losing in the Republican gubernatorial primary. Stuart categorized Beshear as being too liberal for Kentucky, citing his opinion in the Ten Commandments case, as well as his support for abortion rights and gun control. Beshear denied advocating for gun control and charged that Stuart, a state senator from Jefferson County, had not shown any leadership worthy of election to the lieutenant governor's office. Beshear easily defeated Stuart by a vote of 568,869 to 321,352; Wiggins captured just 7,728 votes.

Several changes were proposed to the office of lieutenant governor during Beshear's tenure. In 1984, state representative Bobby Richardson proposed a constitutional amendment to abolish the office. When that effort failed, Richardson introduced a bill in the 1986 General Assembly that would have revoked the lieutenant governor's right to live rent-free in the state's Old Governor's Mansion, eliminated police protection, and restricted the lieutenant governor's use of the state's two executive helicopters. The measure would also have eliminated the lieutenant governor's salary, paying him or her per diem for days served as acting governor or president of the state senate instead. The measure would further have lifted the ban on the lieutenant governor holding other employment. Although the bill would have exempted Beshear from its provisions, Beshear still opposed it and charged that it was politically motivated. Richardson had expressed interest in running for lieutenant governor in the past, and Beshear claimed that because he was never elected to the office, he "doesn't want anybody else to have it." Richardson denied that his efforts were a political ploy; he claimed the office was largely ceremonial and served only as a stepping stone to the governorship. Three of the previous four lieutenant governors had subsequently been elected governor, including the sitting governor Martha Layne Collins.

Despite opposing Richardson's changes to the office, Beshear conceded that the provision of the state constitution that made him acting governor every time Governor Collins left the state was "archaic." During its 1987 organizational session, the General Assembly relieved the lieutenant governor of his membership on the committees that assigned bills to other committees and that managed the flow of legislation on the Senate floor. Later that year, a subcommittee of the Commission on Constitutional Review proposed requiring the governor and lieutenant governor to run as a ticket and combining the office with that of the secretary of state. These recommendations were not acted on during Beshear's term.

During his service as lieutenant governor, Beshear formed and chaired the Kentucky Tomorrow Commission, a privately financed group assembled to make recommendations for the state's future growth and development. The 30-person commission was formed in July 1984 and presented its report – containing more than 100 recommendations – in September 1986. Among the recommendations in the commission's report were several changes to the state constitution, adopted in 1891. The recommended changes included eliminating the offices of state treasurer, secretary of state, and superintendent of public instruction, holding elections only in odd-numbered years instead of every year, and raising the term limit for the state's constitutional officers from one term to two consecutive terms. The state legislature showed little interest in calling a constitutional convention, however, and the commission's recommendations were not immediately adopted, though several have since been implemented. Other recommendations in the commission's report included the creation of lifelong learning programs, implementation of criminal justice reforms, and improvements in worker training. The commission was hailed by some as the most substantial undertaking by a lieutenant governor to date, but was panned by others as a move by Beshear to better position himself for a run for governor in 1987.

Included among Beshear's other activities as lieutenant governor were his participation in an investigation of Kentucky Utilities' coal-buying practices. At issue was whether it was legal and ethical for the company's coal buyer to accept gifts and other perks from coal suppliers. Beshear had clashed with the company over similar issues during his term as attorney general. The company attempted to block Beshear's participation in the investigation, but the Kentucky Public Service Commission rejected the attempt. Due to the length of the investigation and the number of appeals filed, the matter was not fully adjudicated until 1992, well past the end of Beshear's term. The Kentucky Supreme Court ultimately ruled in favor of Kentucky Utilities.

In 1987, Beshear entered a crowded Democratic gubernatorial primary that included former governor Julian Carroll, millionaire bookstore magnate Wallace Wilkinson, and Eastern Kentucky physician Grady Stumbo. Beshear had the backing of the Collins administration and the endorsement of several labor leaders and the state teachers' association; he appeared to be the front-runner in the race until former governor John Y. Brown Jr. entered late and became the instant favorite. Beshear spent much of the campaign running ads that blasted Brown for his jet-setting lifestyle, including, the ads claimed, his "wild nights in Vegas". Brown countered with ads claiming that Beshear was distorting the facts and could not be trusted. Both Beshear and Brown claimed the other would raise taxes if he were elected. The feud between Beshear and Brown allowed Wilkinson, who was last among the candidates according to polls as late as February 1987, to launch his own blitz of ads claiming both Beshear and Brown would raise taxes and proposing a state lottery as an alternative means of raising funds for the state. In the final days of the campaign, Wilkinson surged past both Brown and Beshear and captured 221,138 votes to win the primary; Beshear finished third with 114,439, trailing Brown (163,204 votes) but leading Stumbo (84,613 votes), Carroll (42,137 votes), and three minor candidates.

== Political interim and 1996 Senate bid ==
After his defeat in the 1987 election, Beshear moved to a 35-acre (140,000 m^{2}) farm in Clark County. He resumed his career as a lawyer, joining the 125-member Lexington law firm of Stites and Harbison. He handled several high-profile cases such as the bankruptcy of Calumet Farm and the liquidation of the Kentucky Central Insurance Company. He underwent successful surgery to treat prostate cancer in 1994.

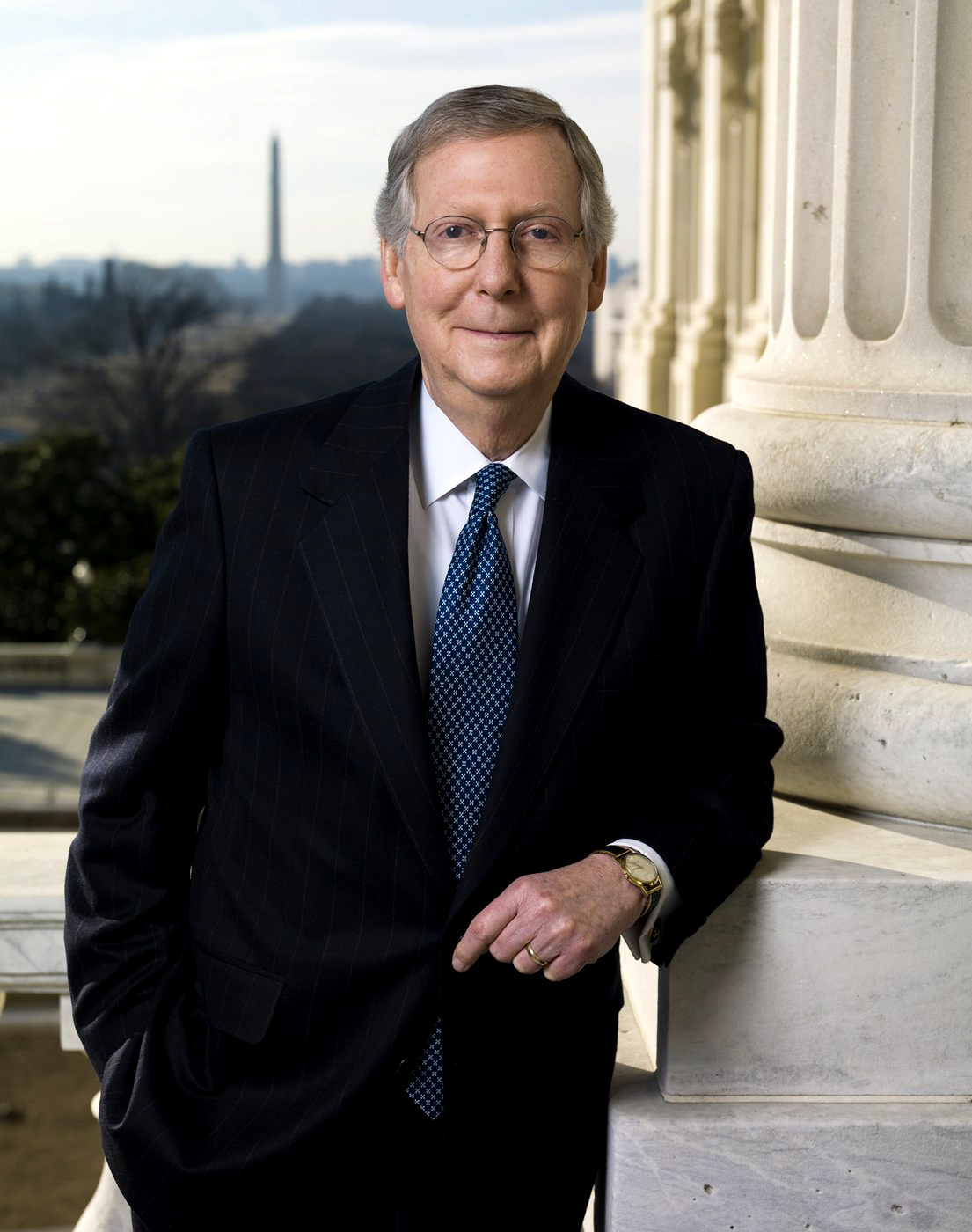
Mitch McConnell turned back Beshear's challenge for his Senate seat in 1996.

Beshear did little in the political arena for almost a decade after his 1987 primary defeat, but in late 1995, he was encouraged by Democratic leaders – including former governor Ned Breathitt, Senator Wendell H. Ford, and Democratic Senatorial Campaign Committee chair Bob Kerrey – to challenge incumbent Republican senator Mitch McConnell. Beshear entered the primary as a heavy favorite against Tom Barlow, a former one-term Congressman from Kentucky's First District, and Shelby Lanier, a retired Louisville police officer. During the primary campaign, Beshear virtually ignored Barlow and Lanier and focused his rhetoric on McConnell. Despite Barlow's tour of all 120 Kentucky counties, Beshear cruised to victory in the primary, garnering 177,859 votes (66.38%) to Barlow's 64,235 (23.97%) and Lanier's 25,856 (9.65%).

Beshear faced heavy deficits in polls against McConnell throughout the general election campaign. McConnell also raised twice as much money as Beshear during the campaign. Beshear tried to make McConnell's fundraising a campaign issue, claiming much of the money came from political action committees that represented interests that lobbied the Senate committees on which McConnell served. McConnell defended his contributors, saying that the right to free speech included the right to donate money. Beshear charged that Republicans, including McConnell, had voted to cut Medicare; McConnell responded that Republicans had not cut Medicare, but had put forward a plan to curb its growth, a plan that didn't differ significantly, McConnell said, from the one proposed by Democratic President Bill Clinton.

The campaign turned personal during the second of two debates between the two candidates when McConnell charged that the Iroquois Hunt Club, to which Beshear belonged, had no African-American members and was racially discriminatory. Beshear denied that the club was discriminatory and fired back that a prominent McConnell supporter from Louisville was "virulently anti-women." McConnell countered that Beshear had taken money from a labor union group that was under investigation for links to organized crime. After the debate, it was revealed that the Pendennis Club, of which McConnell had been a member, was under investigation for discriminatory membership practices; McConnell claimed he had resigned his membership in the club after perceiving that it practiced discrimination, but did not express his reasons for resigning to the club's membership or leadership. Ultimately, none of Beshear's arguments gained much traction, and he lost the race by 724,794 votes (55.5%) to 560,012 (42.9%). At the time, it was the largest victory margin of McConnell's career. In a 2009 biography of McConnell, author John David Dyche wrote that Beshear "had no illusions about his chance of success [in the race against McConnell], but for the sake of his party, and hoping to ride the coattails of President Clinton's likely re-election, he got in the race." After the book's release, Beshear said through a spokesman that Dyche's assessment "sounds accurate."

Beshear continued his legal practice at Stites and Harbison following his defeat by McConnell. In 2001, the firm was hired to represent creditors in a bankruptcy case against Wallace Wilkinson, Beshear's opponent in the 1987 gubernatorial primary. The firm also represented four creditors of Wallace's Bookstore, the company through which Wilkinson had made his fortune. Wilkinson unsuccessfully sought to have the firm removed from the case, citing a potential conflict of interest stemming from his old political rivalry with Beshear. The case was eventually settled in 2002, four months after Wilkinson's death.

== 2007 gubernatorial campaign ==
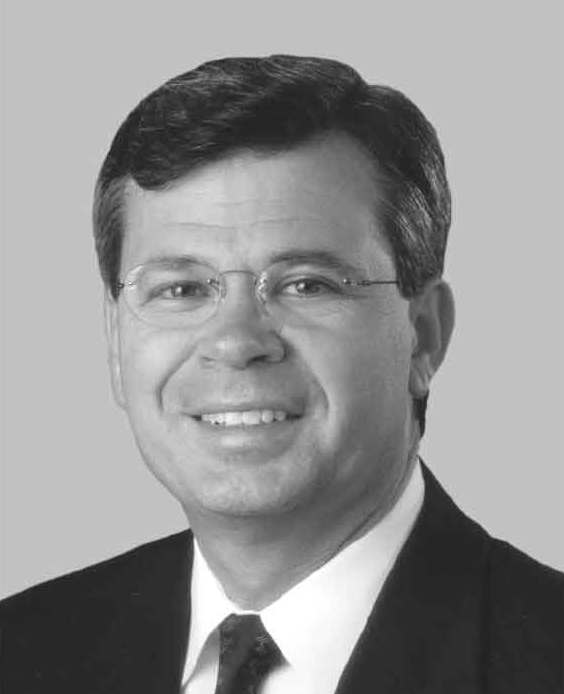
Governor Ernie Fletcher failed in his re-election bid against Beshear.

On December 18, 2006, Beshear announced that he would enter the 2007 gubernatorial race with Hazard physician and state senator Daniel Mongiardo as his running mate. Beshear promised to return "integrity" to the governor's office, a slap at sitting governor Ernie Fletcher, who was seeking re-election despite a recently concluded investigation into his administration's hiring practices conducted by Democratic Attorney General Greg Stumbo. At the time, the only other declared Democratic candidates were state treasurer Jonathan Miller and Harlan contractor Otis Hensley Jr., who only ran a limited campaign. By the filing deadline, the list of Democratic challengers had grown to include Louisville millionaire businessman Bruce Lunsford, former lieutenant governor Steve Henry, Speaker of the Kentucky House of Representatives Jody Richards, and perennial candidate Gatewood Galbraith.

Early polls showed that Beshear and Henry led the Democratic field in name recognition, but both trailed Fletcher and his Republican primary rival Anne Northup in that area. Early in the campaign, Beshear attempted to set himself apart from the other candidates by supporting a constitutional amendment that would allow expanded casino gambling in the state, which he claimed could generate $500 million in new revenue without the need to raise taxes. Observers noted that this strategy was remarkably similar to the one used by Wallace Wilkinson, who, in his 1987 primary victory over Beshear and others, trumpeted the revenue a state lottery would generate. Initially, all of the Democratic candidates except Hensley endorsed a casino amendment, but as Beshear made it the centerpiece of his campaign, support from other candidates began to waver; Richards officially changed his position to oppose the amendment, while several other candidates charged that Beshear was staking too much of his platform on a proposal that was not guaranteed to pass.

In April 2007, Beshear received the endorsement of former governor Brereton Jones. Just two weeks before the primary, candidate Jonathan Miller dropped out of the race and endorsed Beshear. Miller, who was consistently lagging in the polls, indicated that he was endorsing Beshear to prevent an "unelectable" candidate from becoming the Democratic Party's nominee for the fall campaign. He later admitted that comment was aimed at Lunsford, who dropped out of the 2003 Democratic gubernatorial primary and in the general election endorsed Fletcher over Democratic candidate Ben Chandler, and at Henry, who faced allegations of illegal medical billing and improper campaign financing. Buoyed by these endorsements, Beshear surged ahead and won the primary; he garnered 40.9 percent of the vote, just enough to avoid a costly runoff election with Lunsford, the second-place finisher.

Incumbent governor Fletcher emerged from the Republican primary, and Beshear immediately looked to make the investigation against Fletcher the primary issue of the campaign. Fletcher countered by strengthening his opposition to Beshear's casino expansion plan. In June 2007, Fletcher backed off an earlier commitment to let Kentuckians vote on a casino gambling amendment; a campaign staffer told reporters that "The voters will have their chance to decide this issue in [the] November [election]. To put it on the ballot would be redundant." Fletcher's choice to make casino gambling the centerpiece of the campaign proved ineffective. After months of campaigning on the issue, a SurveyUSA poll showed that Fletcher had gained only 6 percentage points on Beshear and still trailed him by 16 percentage points. Further, polling showed that more than half of the state's voters believed Fletcher had acted unethically about the claims in the hiring investigation, while 81% believed the casino gambling amendment should be placed on the ballot. Late in the campaign, eight of Kentucky's leading newspapers endorsed Beshear. Ultimately, Beshear was elected by a vote of 619,567 to 435,856.

== 2011 gubernatorial campaign ==
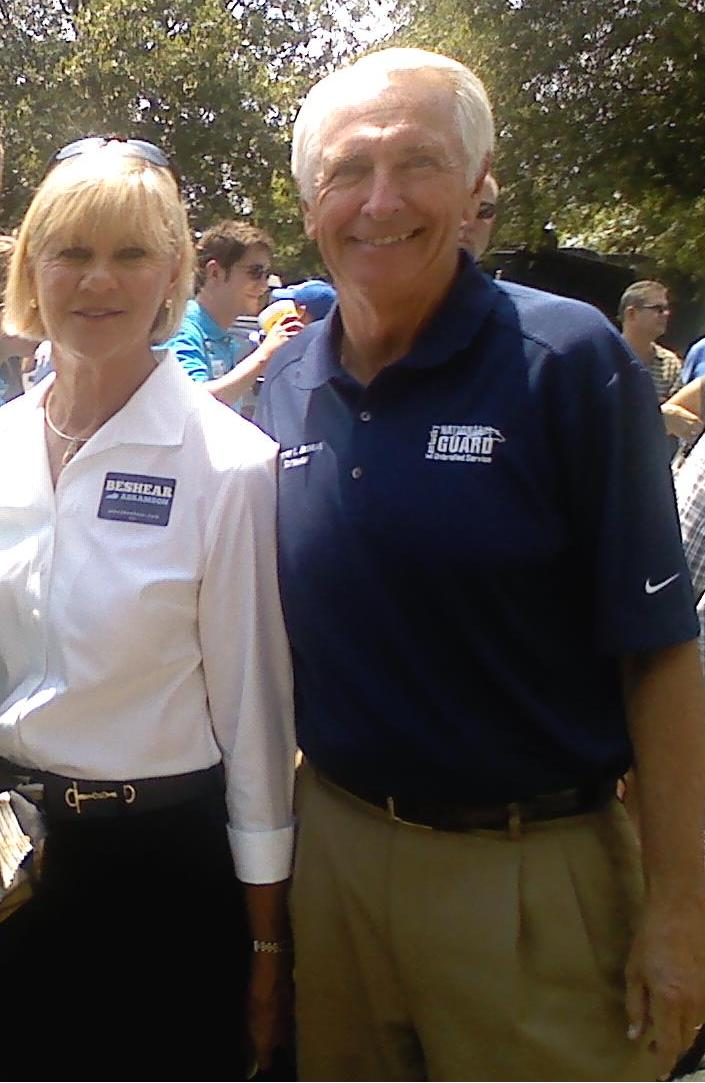
Governor Beshear and his wife Jane at Fancy Farm 2011

On January 26, 2009, Lieutenant Governor Daniel Mongiardo announced that he would seek the Democratic nomination to challenge incumbent senator Jim Bunning (who later chose to retire instead) in the 2010 senatorial election. The move effectively prohibited Mongiardo from running for re-election with Beshear in the 2011 gubernatorial contest. On July 19, 2009, Beshear announced that Louisville mayor Jerry Abramson would replace Mongiardo as his running mate in his re-election campaign.

Beshear faced no opposition in the Democratic gubernatorial primary, held on May 17, 2011. In the Republican primary, Senate President David Williams defeated Louisville businessman Phil Moffett, a favorite of the Tea Party Movement, and Bobbie Holsclaw, county clerk of Jefferson County. Perennial candidate Gatewood Galbraith sought the governorship as an independent after collecting the requisite 5,000 signatures from registered voters requesting that his name be added to the ballot.

On November 8, 2011, Beshear was re-elected as governor of Kentucky with close to 56% of the vote in a three-way race. Democratic candidates won all but one of the statewide offices on the same night.

== Governorship ==
Soon after taking office, Beshear ordered $78 million in budget cuts, citing a $434 million projected deficit in the state budget. Republican Senate President David Williams questioned the legality of the cuts, claiming that the shortfall was only $117.5 million and that $145 million in surplus funds from the previous fiscal year would cover the difference. Beshear countered that the legislature had already authorized $138 million in expenditures from the surplus fund and that his reckoning of the deficit also included $300 million in "additional spending needs". Williams stopped short of filing a legal challenge to the cuts, but warned Beshear that the General Assembly would closely monitor the cuts and override any they disagreed with by passing modifications to the 2006–2008 budget after the commencement of the legislative session in February.

Beshear was dealt the first political setback of his term in the special election to fill the state Senate seat of his lieutenant governor, Daniel Mongiardo. Despite a 2-to-1 voter registration advantage in the district for Democratic candidates and the fact that both Beshear and Mongiardo campaigned heavily for Democratic nominee Scott Alexander, Republican Brandon Smith captured the open seat by 401 votes. The loss by Alexander was the most expensive in state legislative history and gave Republicans a 22–15 advantage over Democratic members in the state senate; the chamber also included one Independent.

=== 2008 legislative session and special session ===
Much of the debate in the 2008 legislative session centered on crafting a budget for the 2008–2010 biennium, a period when the state was projected to encounter a shortfall of nearly $1 billion. Beshear expressed surprise that the budget issues consumed so much of the Assembly's time during the session, but admitted that the legislature had become much more independent of the governor than it was when he was a legislator two decades earlier. He listed early childhood education and expanded health care for children among the priorities that he was unable to address in the session.

On February 15, 2008, Beshear unveiled his promised legislation that would allow casino gambling in Kentucky. Beshear's plan included a constitutional amendment allowing 12 casinos to be licensed in the state – seven at each of the state's horse racetracks and five additional free-standing casinos – and a companion bill specifying how the increased revenues would be spent. After the plan encountered initial resistance, House leadership reduced the number of casinos that would have been allowed by the amendment to nine. One proposal, authored by House Speaker Jody Richards, would have guaranteed five casino licenses to the state's racetracks and allowed the other four to go to free-standing casinos. A competing measure, drafted by House Majority Whip Rob Wilkey and Speaker Pro Tem Larry Clark, would have allowed all nine licenses to be awarded competitively, with none specifically reserved for racetracks. In late February, the House Elections, Constitutional Amendments, and Intergovernmental Affairs committee failed to advance either proposal to the full floor of the House of Representatives. The following day, Speaker Richards removed Representative Dottie Sims from the committee; Sims claimed Richards retaliated against her for voting against the proposals, but Richards said he removed Sims because she told him she would vote for the proposals and then voted against them. Following Sims' removal the committee passed the amendment.

The casino legislation was not called to a vote in the Democratic controlled Kentucky House of Representatives, where 60 votes out of 100 would have been required for passage. Beshear announced that his proposal for a constitutional amendment to allow for casinos was dead for the regular session on March 27, 2008. Among the other proposals favored by Beshear that failed to pass in the session were an ethics reform measure Beshear proposed in the wake of the investigation of the Fletcher administration, a plan to reduce the projected shortfall in the state's pension system, and a proposed 70-cent-per-pack tax increase on cigarettes. Besides the state budget, major legislation passed during the session included incentives for homeowners and businesses to utilize energy efficiency measures, anti-bullying legislation, and increased penalties for animal cruelty.

In the final hours of the legislative session, both houses of the General Assembly resorted to the controversial practice of stopping the clocks in their respective chambers a few minutes before midnight to avoid the constitutionally mandated deadline for the end of the session – midnight on April 15. The Assembly then passed twelve bills between midnight and 1 o'clock on April 16 before adjourning. Among those bills was House Bill 79, which provided funding and direction for the state's road-building plan for the next six years. The bill was delivered to Beshear later in the day, and he vetoed it on April 26. With the General Assembly unable to reconvene and override the veto, Senate President David Williams filed suit, claiming Beshear's veto was invalid because it was not issued within 10 days of the bill's passage. Williams' reasoning was based on the fact that, according to the legislative record, the bill was passed on April 15. Beshear countersued, claiming the bill was actually passed on April 16 and thus invalid to begin with. On July 31, 2008, a Lexington judge sided with Beshear, invalidating the law and declaring that the General Assembly would no longer be allowed to use the practice of stopping the clocks; he did not rule on the validity of the other bills passed after the session expired.

Dissatisfied that the General Assembly had not acted to shore up the state pension system, Beshear called a special legislative session for July 23, 2008, after House and Senate leaders informed him that they had reached an agreement on a plan after the regular legislative session's end. The session lasted five days, the minimum amount of time required to maneuver the bill through the legislative process.

=== Other matters of 2008 ===
Following the legislative session, Beshear began to address his agenda related to energy production. In April 2008, he announced that he would divide the state's Environmental and Public Protection Cabinet to form a new Energy and Environmental Cabinet. The move essentially reversed the consolidation of Environmental, Public Protection, and Labor Cabinets effected under Beshear's predecessor, Ernie Fletcher. Later in the year, Beshear released what he called the state's first-ever comprehensive energy plan. The plan called for expansion of solar, wind, and biomass energy generation, as well as more speculative ventures such as coal gasification and carbon capture and sequestration. Although the plan called for an exploration of the use of nuclear power, Beshear stopped short of advocating an end to the state's ban on the construction of nuclear reactors.

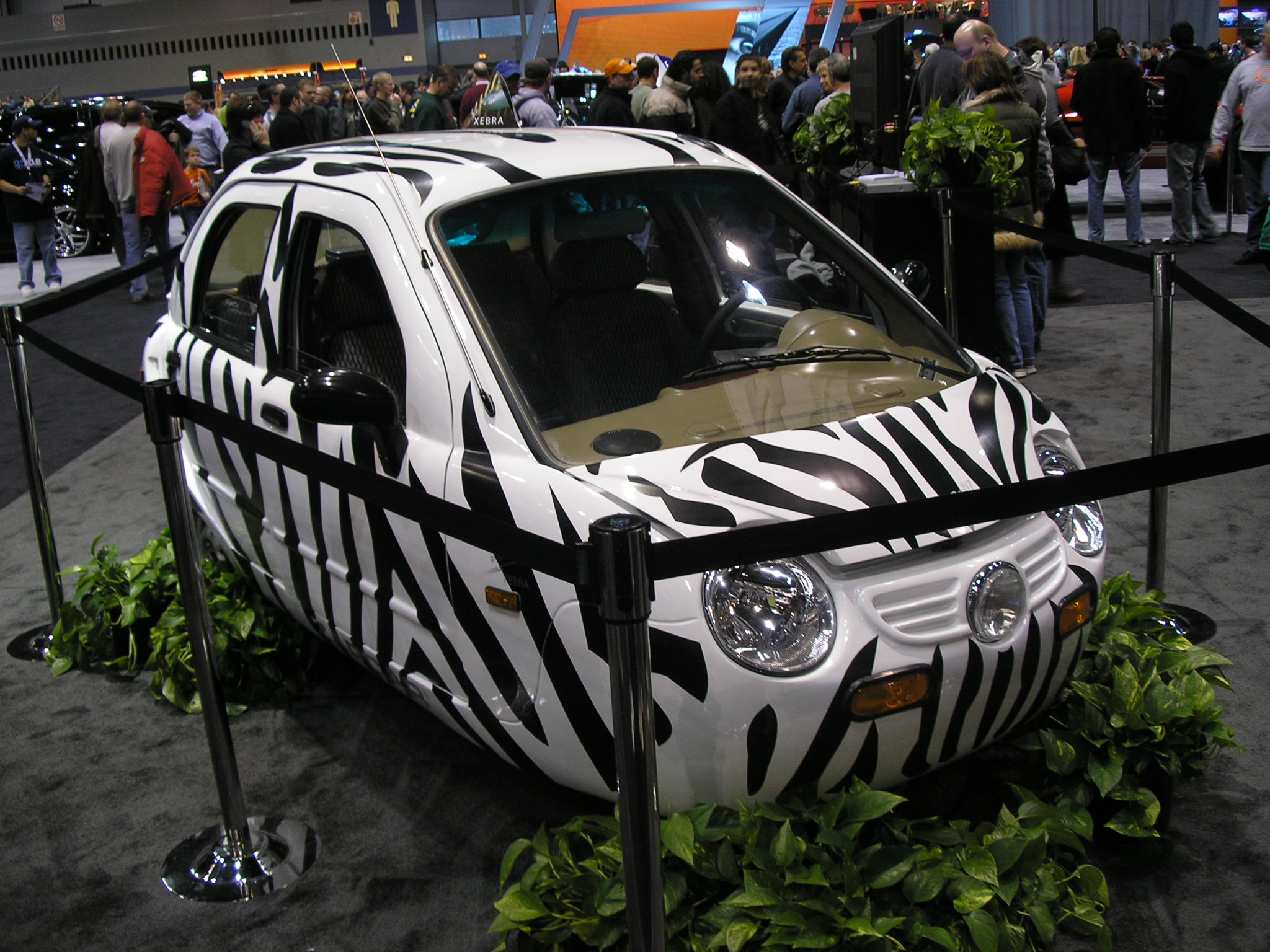
ZAP cars like this one would have been manufactured in Kentucky before the proposed factory lost its funding.

Hoping to attract a proposed ZAP electric vehicle manufacturing plant to the city of Franklin, Kentucky, Beshear issued an executive order permitting low-speed vehicles on many Kentucky roads in August 2008. The state also offered the company $48 million in tax incentives, contingent upon its delivering a promised 4,000 jobs. Construction of the proposed plant stalled, however, when GE Capital, a primary investor, pulled out of the project. ZAP officials maintained their intention to build the plant, but said they would also consider other states' proposals if they could not replace the $125 million commitment from GE.

Beshear clashed with the state Council on Postsecondary Education over its hiring of Brad Cowgill as its president. Beshear said state law required that the Council conduct a national search for its president and that they hire someone with experience and an established reputation in higher education; he claimed that Cowgill, a Lexington lawyer and state budget director for former governor Fletcher, was not qualified for the position and that the council hired him without a national search. Democratic Attorney General Jack Conway issued a non-binding opinion that the hiring was illegal under state law, and Cowgill resigned rather than wage a legal battle with Beshear. Beshear, who had considered asking all of the council members to resign or abolishing the council altogether in favor of a new one, praised Cowgill's decision. Democratic House Budget Committee Chairman Harry Moberly said Cowgill "had the council headed in the right direction" and added "I would have been satisfied if Brad had the permanent position, but I do not criticize the governor for the role he had played [in Cowgill's resignation]." Senate President David Williams called Beshear's interference in the matter "unfortunate".

In September 2008, Beshear's administration attempted to seize control of 141 gambling-related domain names in an attempt to block Kentucky residents from accessing those websites. Beshear claimed the sites were conducting illegal, unregulated gambling operations in the state and providing untaxed competition to the state's horse racing industry. Later that year, a Franklin County judge ruled that Beshear had the authority to seize the domain names, but the Kentucky Court of Appeals overturned that ruling on appeal. Beshear appealed to the Kentucky Supreme Court, partially because the website owners were being represented by gambling associations and players groups who, Beshear said, had no legal standing in the case. In 2010, the Kentucky Supreme Court agreed with Beshear and ordered the website owners themselves to appear before the court. On December 23, 2015, Franklin County Circuit Court Judge Thomas Wingate ruled in favor of the state and awarded it $870 million in damages. The other party to the case, Amaya Gaming, announced it would appeal the decision.

=== 2009 legislative session ===
During the organizational session of the 2009 General Assembly, House Speaker Jody Richards was ousted by House Democratic members by a three-vote margin in favor of former Majority Leader and Attorney General Greg Stumbo. Some speculated that Beshear had personally interfered on behalf of Stumbo, a charge he denied. When asked about Beshear's alleged interference, Richards refused to comment.

Due to the state's worsening economy, the primary issue facing the legislature for the session was a $456 million budget shortfall. Expanded gambling was again proposed as a possible source of revenue, and a bill to allow slot machines at the state's racetracks passed the House Licensing and Occupations Committee, but died in the House Appropriations and Revenue Committee. Speaker Stumbo expressed doubt that he had enough votes to pass the measure even if it were brought to the House floor. Instead, the Assembly passed a series of tax bills to deal with the shortfall. The Assembly also began the process of reforming the state's system of school accountability testing, a move advocated by Beshear. Other bills passed during the session revised the state road plan to allocate newly available federal stimulus funds, created a program to divert accused substance abusers to treatment before their trials, and created a statewide database for tracking payday loans.

The rules of the House of Representatives required that the final two days of the chamber's session be reserved for overriding any vetoes by the governor. Beshear hoped that the House would suspend the rules, as they had in previous years, to consider bills to increase funding to public defenders, create a transportation authority to oversee bridge-building projects in Louisville and Henderson, and provide various economic incentives, including a package intended to lure a NASCAR Sprint Cup Series race to Kentucky Speedway. The House refused to suspend the rules, however, citing its desire to receive legislation promptly in the future. The chamber allowed Beshear's one veto to stand and adjourned a day early.

=== Other matters of 2009 and special legislative session ===
Following the 2009 legislative session, Attorney General Jack Conway was asked to issue advisory opinions on two gambling-related issues. Republican state senator Damon Thayer asked for an opinion as to whether Instant Racing – allowing individuals to bet on the outcome of previously run horse races – would be allowable under the state constitution. Democratic representative Jody Richards also asked for an advisory opinion as to whether a constitutional amendment was required to allow video lottery terminals at the state's racetracks or whether they could be construed as legal under the amendment that allowed a state lottery. Critics charged that Conway had a conflict of interest in the matter because his father was a member of the Kentucky Horse Racing Commission, but Conway denied that a conflict existed, and the state Executive Branch Ethics Board refused to take a position unless an official request for an investigation was made. Conway subsequently opined in June 2009 that video lottery terminals would be legal if governed by the Kentucky Lottery Corporation and in January 2010 that instant racing would be allowable under the state's parimutuel betting statutes with a few regulatory changes.

In an effort to cut costs, the Kentucky State Police announced in May 2009 that it would only offer the state driving test in English beginning June 1, 2009. The test had previously been offered in 22 foreign languages, but the state police said that the foreign language versions of the test had not been updated to reflect recent changes to driving laws. Two days later, Beshear announced the reversal of the state police's new policy, saying he was not informed of it and believed it was the wrong thing to do. He promised the foreign language versions of the test would be updated and would continue to be offered.

In April 2009, Beshear announced a partnership between the University of Kentucky, the University of Louisville, and Chicago-based Argonne National Laboratory to construct a research facility in Lexington to develop advanced battery technologies that could be used to power electric cars. A week later, the National Alliance for Advanced Transportation Battery Cell Manufacture announced they would locate a battery manufacturing plant in Hardin County, citing the nearby research facility as an incentive for choosing Kentucky over competing sites. The venture, however, was predicated upon receiving $342 million in federal stimulus funds; in August 2009, those funds were denied, and officials conceded it was unlikely that the plant would be built.

Beshear called another special legislative session in June 2009 to address another $1 billion shortfall in the state budget. Later, Beshear amended the call to include the economic incentives package that was not approved during the regular session and, in light of Attorney General Conway's opinion on video lottery terminals, a measure to expand gambling in the state by statute. With the threshold lowered from 60 votes for a constitutional amendment to 51 votes for a statute, the House of Representatives passed the expanded gambling bill, but the measure died in the Republican-dominated Senate Appropriations and Revenue Committee by a 10–5 vote. The amended budget and the economic incentives bills both passed in the 10-day session.

Again unable to get his expanded gambling proposal past the Senate, Beshear attempted to chip away at the Republican majority in that chamber by appointing some Republican senators to lucrative positions in the executive and judicial branches in advance of the 2010 General Assembly. Shortly after the special session, Beshear named Republican senator Charlie Borders to the state Public Safety Commission. That appointment set up a special election for Borders' seat, which was won by Democratic senator Robin Webb, reducing the Republican majority to 20–17 with one Independent who usually voted with the Republicans. Following Webb's victory, Beshear appointed Republican senator Dan Kelly to a circuit judgeship, but Republicans held on to that seat in a special election.

=== 2010 legislative and special sessions ===
Early in the 2010 legislative session, Beshear presented his biennial budget proposal to the General Assembly. The state projected a $1.5 billion shortfall for the biennium, and Beshear once again proposed to make up for the shortfall with revenue generated from expanded gambling. Days after Beshear presented the proposal, both House Speaker Stumbo and Senate President Williams declared all gambling legislation "dead" for the session, saying there was no political will in either chamber to pass such legislation ahead of the legislative elections in November. The process of crafting a budget consumed the vast majority of the Assembly's time during the session, but legislators reached the constitutionally mandated end of their session with no agreement. Announcing his intent to call a special session to pass a budget and prevent a state government shutdown, Beshear blasted the leadership of both chambers for discarding his budget proposal. "[W]riting their own budget would be their 'defining moment'," Beshear said the legislators had claimed. "Well, it was. A moment of abject failure." Beshear said expanded gambling would not be on the agenda for the special session unless an agreement were reached before the session date. In May 2010, legislators reconvened and passed a budget. Beshear utilized his line-item veto on 19 items in the budget, claiming they restricted his ability to implement the reduction in executive expenses mandated by the budget. Legislators were unable to override the vetoes because the special session had already adjourned.

In July 2010, Beshear announced six mandatory, unpaid furlough days for most state employees to achieve the savings called for by the budget. Later in the month, Beshear announced exceptions from the furlough for public safety and mental health care workers. The American Federation of County, State, and Municipal Employees (AFCSME) Council 62, which represents about 9,000 of Kentucky's state workers, filed suit to block implementation of the furloughs. A Franklin County Circuit Court Judge refused to issue an injunction in September 2010, but allowed the lawsuit to proceed. A month later, AFCSME agreed to drop the suit and address the furlough issue through Beshear's Employee Advisory Council. Ultimately, all six furlough days were observed as outlined in Beshear's plan.

=== 2011 legislative and special sessions ===
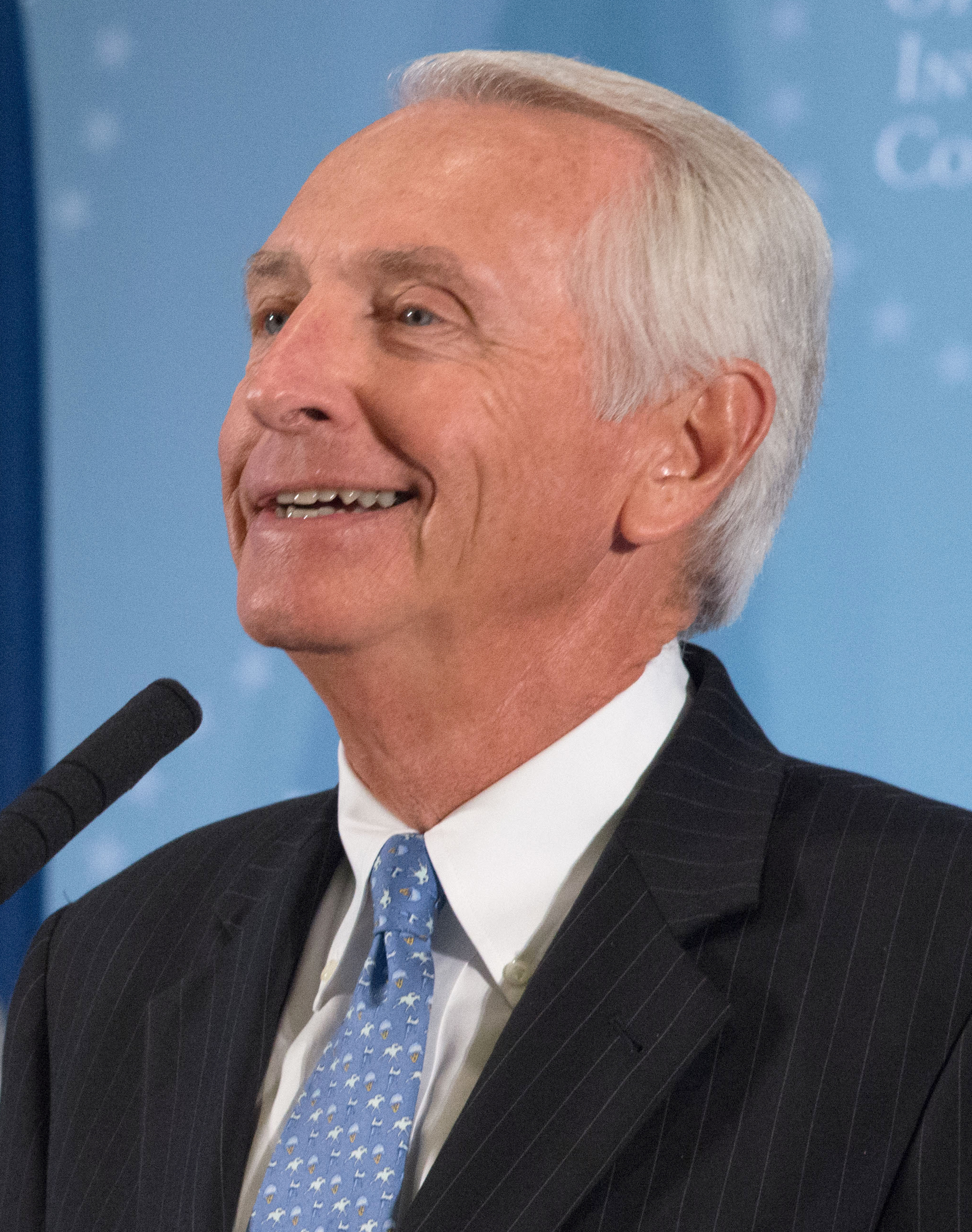
Beshear in 2014

In the lead-up to the 2011 legislative session, state senator and former governor Julian Carroll declared, "In all the years I've been around the Capitol, I can't recall people expecting so little from a legislative session." Carroll's pessimism was the result of Senate President David Williams' announcement that he would challenge Beshear in the upcoming gubernatorial election, which Carroll believed would disincentivize cooperation between the two leaders.

Among the items passed in the legislative session were a bill allowing optometrists to perform eye surgery (a procedure usually reserved for ophthalmologists), a ban on the sale of a psychoactive drug marketed as "bath salts", and a measure allowing community supervision and addiction treatment as jail alternatives for non-violent drug criminals. Measures that did not pass included tougher measures to curb illegal immigration advocated by Williams and raising the legal age for dropping out of high school from sixteen to eighteen, a proposal supported by Beshear. Also, the Assembly was unable to agree on whether to adopt Beshear's plan to address a shortfall in the state's Medicaid obligations or an alternative plan proposed by Williams. Beshear's plan involved moving $166 million from the second year of the biennial budget to cover the shortfall and cover the costs in the second year through savings achieved by switching to a managed care plan for Medicaid. Williams' plan, passed by the Republican majority in the state senate, called for $101 million in cuts to state government spending to cover the shortfall. Without a plan in place, Beshear estimated that the state would have to cut Medicaid reimbursements to health care providers by 30 percent.

Immediately following the end of the legislative session, Beshear called for a special legislative session to consider a way to meet the state's Medicaid obligations and whether or not to raise the minimum dropout age. In the special session, legislators also approved raising the minimum dropout age to 18 during the special session. Following the session, the National Education Association honored Beshear with its America's Greatest Education Governor Award for 2011, citing his advocacy for raising the minimum dropout age and his consistent refusal to cut education funding. Both houses also approved a plan that allowed Beshear to move the funds from the second year of the budget, but triggered automatic spending cuts if the managed care plans did not generate sufficient savings. The bill also called for the hiring of an independent accounting firm to assess the savings achieved by the managed care plans. Beshear then used his line-item veto to strike the spending cuts and the savings assessment provisions, per a previous arrangement with Democratic lawmakers. By eliminating these provisions, the version of the bill signed by Beshear was essentially the plan he had proposed during the regular session. The House adjourned the session on March 24, but the Senate remained in session until April 6, voting to override Beshear's vetoes, but without concurrence from the House, the override votes were ineffective.

== Post-governorship ==
Beshear delivered the Democratic response to a speech to a joint session of the United States Congress given by President Donald Trump on February 28, 2017. Beshear was chosen due to his successful implementation of the Affordable Care Act in Kentucky and to bring back the white, rural voters that Democrats felt they had lost in the 2016 presidential election. Connecticut Congresswoman Rosa DeLauro, a Democrat, praised the choice, saying "[Beshear] led the country in the health care exchanges in the Affordable Care Act, knows firsthand about the success of the Affordable Care Act" Other Democrats, however, felt it was a mistake, with Pennsylvania's Bob Brady saying, "I don't know who the former governor of Kentucky is, and I don't think anybody else does, either. Do you?"

Reviewing the response, The Cincinnati Enquirer wrote, "Judging from the response from Twitter and TV pundits, it did not go well." Fox News reported that the speech was "widely mocked". The New York Post noted one particularly resonating statement when Beshear said, "I'm a proud Democrat, but first and foremost, I'm a proud Republican, and Democrat, and mostly, American." The criticism extended to Beshear's choice of backdrop – "people sitting behind him, near motionless, in a dimly lit diner" – which comedian Stephen Colbert described as your "normal, relatable everyday diner where everyone faces the same direction in terrified silence." Emanuel Cleaver, a Democratic congressman from Missouri concluded, "I don't mind saying when we make mistakes. And [selecting Beshear for the response] was a mistake."

During 2017, Beshear was a Richard L. and Ronay A. Menschel Senior Leadership Fellow at the Harvard T.H. Chan School of Public Health. In that role, he taught a course in the Department of Health Policy and Management titled "A Governor's Perspective on Leadership."

Party political offices
| Preceded by Robert F. Stephens | Democratic nominee for Attorney General of Kentucky; 1979 | Succeeded by David L. Armstrong |
| Preceded by Martha Layne Collins | Democratic nominee for Lieutenant Governor of Kentucky; 1983 | Succeeded by Brereton C. Jones |
| Preceded by Harvey Sloane | Democratic nominee for U.S. Senator from Kentucky (Class 2); 1996 | Succeeded by Lois Combs Weinberg |
| Preceded by Ben Chandler | Democratic nominee for Governor of Kentucky; 2007, 2011 | Succeeded by Jack Conway |
| Preceded by Nikki Haley | Response to the State of the Union address 2017 | Succeeded by Joe Kennedy III |
Legal offices
| Preceded by Robert Stephens | Attorney General of Kentucky; 1979–1984 | Succeeded by David Armstrong |
Political offices
| Preceded by Martha Layne Collins | Lieutenant Governor of Kentucky; 1983–1987 | Succeeded by Brereton Jones |
| Preceded by Ernie Fletcher | Governor of Kentucky; 2007–2015 | Succeeded by Matt Bevin |
U.S. order of precedence (ceremonial)
| Preceded by Ernie Fletcher as Former Governor | Order of precedence of the United States | Succeeded by Matt Bevin as Former Governor |
