= Thomas Barlow (Kentucky politician) =

American politician (1940–2017)

Tom Barlow
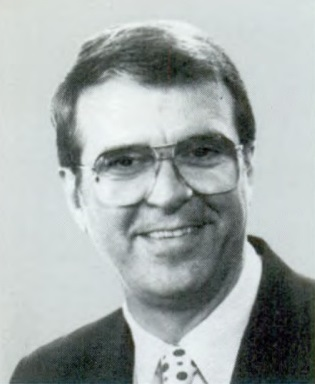

Member of the U.S. House of Representatives from Kentucky's 1st district
- In office January 3, 1993 – January 3, 1995
- Preceded by: Carroll Hubbard
- Succeeded by: Ed Whitfield

Personal details
- Born: August 7, 1940 Washington, D.C., U.S.
- Died: January 31, 2017 (aged 76) Paducah, Kentucky, U.S.
- Resting place: Barlow, Kentucky, U.S.
- Party: Democratic
- Education: Haverford College
- Profession: Banker, business executive, politician

Thomas Jefferson Barlow III (August 7, 1940 – January 31, 2017), was an American Democratic politician who served as a member of the United States House of Representatives from Kentucky's 1st congressional district for one term.

== Early life and education ==
Barlow was born in Washington, D.C., but grew up in Louisville, Kentucky. He graduated from Haverford College in Pennsylvania.

== Career ==
After graduating from college, Barlow worked as a banker and business executive, and later as a conservation consultant for the Natural Resources Defense Council from 1971 to 1982. In 1986 he sought election to Congress from Kentucky's 1st district but lost the Democratic primary to incumbent Representative Carroll Hubbard.

In 1992 Barlow ran against Hubbard again; by this time, Hubbard had become embroiled in the "Rubbergate" House banking scandal. Barlow upset Hubbard in the primary and went on to win the general election over Republican Steve Hamrick. Barlow served in the 103rd Congress from January 3, 1993, to January 3, 1995.

In 1994 Barlow ran for re-election but was defeated by Ed Whitfield in an election year that saw many Republican victories nationwide, as the Republican Party won the House of Representatives for the first time in forty years.

Barlow sought the 1st District House seat again in 1998 but lost to Whitfield. He ran for the United States Senate in 2002 but narrowly lost the Democratic primary to Lois Combs Weinberg. Barlow won the Democratic nomination for his old House seat yet again in 2006 but was defeated by Whitfield for the third time in the general election.

== Death ==
Barlow died in Paducah, Kentucky on January 31, 2017.

U.S. House of Representatives
Preceded by Carroll Hubbard	Member of the U.S. House of Representatives from Kentucky's 1st congressional district 1993 – 1995	Succeeded by Ed Whitfield
