= Susan Johns =

American politician (born 1954)

Susan D. Johns

Member of the Kentucky House of Representatives from the 32nd district
- In office January 1, 1997 – January 1, 2001
- Preceded by: Anne Northup
- Succeeded by: Scott Brinkman

Member of the Kentucky Senate from the 36th district
- In office January 1, 1991 – January 1, 1995
- Preceded by: Eugene P. Stuart
- Succeeded by: Julie Denton

Personal details
- Born: October 7, 1954 (age 71)
- Party: Democratic
- Education: Georgetown College (BA, MA)

Susan Denise Johns (born October 7, 1954) is a former Kentucky politician and member of the Democratic Party. After receiving degrees from Georgetown College, she worked in education before representing District 36 in the Kentucky Senate from 1991 to 1995 and District 32 in the Kentucky House of Representatives from 1997 to 2001. Her 1990 state Senate win received note from both parties' officials and The Courier-Journal for its smart, local strategizing in a heavily Republican district. In 2012, she ran for House District 48 against incumbent Bob DeWeese but lost. Most of her positions and legislation passed focused on issues concerning education, women, or domestic violence. Outside of politics, she has worked as a teacher and in various managerial positions, and she has been affiliated with several women's organizations and political or charitable organizations.

== Political career ==
Johns won Kentucky's heavily Republican district 36th Senate District in 1990 from Republican Eugene P. Stuart with 52% of the vote and a 1,689 vote margin, in part due to Stuart's underestimation of her candidacy and in part due to her strategy of "a computer-targeted campaign designed in part to woo women voters," as otherwise there would be no women in the Kentucky Senate. Due to the odds, she received little big-name Democratic support during her campaign and downplayed her party affiliation, which both parties credited as a smart move; her campaign received little money and, instead of running billboards or radio ads, used yard signs, letters, and cards. Her strategy also included neighborhood walks in areas that, in previous elections, were more likely to switch or had less knowledge of Stuart. She received an endorsement from The Courier-Journal, and Attorney General of Kentucky Fred Cowan and Lieutenant Governor of Kentucky Brereton Jones campaigned for her. Feminist author Sallie Bingham donated $500.

In 1992, while in the Kentucky Senate, Johns In 1994, she was a major player in the passage of the state's Child Care Reform Bill, "which significantly improved Kentucky laws in protecting adult and child victims of domestic violence," and in 1994, she led an investigation against Medicaid fraud, earning high marks. She was the only woman serving on the state senate during the latter term, and according to a survey conducted by the Kentucky Center for Public Issues, she "was ranked the ninth most influential Senator for the 1994 General Assembly."

Despite strong opposition, Johns passed a 1994 bill outlawing "corporal punishment in licensed or certified child care programs."

Johns was defeated for reelection in 1994 by Republican Julie Denton.

In 1996, Johns won Kentucky's 32nd House District. She received endorsements that described her as fiscally conservative and socially moderate. During her term, Johns began caucusing with other female legislators (including Joni Jenkins, Ruth Ann Palumbo, Eleanor Jordan, Mary Lou Marzian, Kathy Stein, and more) to track legislation in their individual fields of expertise and work together to affect legislation more easily than they could have done alone. One early victory involved "building statewide opposition to a bill that, before their organized effort, likely would have gone unnoticed and passed easily, [...] removing the requirement that educational institutions offer women's softball as well as men's baseball, violating the spirit if not the letter of Title IX."

Johns' actions during legislative sessions were recognized by the Kentucky Education Association and other educational associations. She served on the Attorney General of Kentucky's Domestic Violence Task Force and the Governor of Kentucky's Child Care Policy Council, and she chaired the Governor's Task Force on Health/Fitness.

Johns was defeated for reelection in 2000 by Republican Scott Brinkman.

In 2012, Johns ran for the House of Representatives against incumbent Bob DeWeese but lost. She was endorsed by the local Iron Workers Union.

== Personal life ==
Johns grew up in Jefferson County, Kentucky, and Clearwater, Florida, attending Clearwater public schools since her family lived there 9 months of the year. She attended Georgetown College, where she earned a Bachelor of Arts and Master of Arts, the latter of which was in Education. During her undergraduate years, she was a member of the sorority Sigma Kappa. The Courier-Journal states that, "As a college student and young adult, she stuffed envelopes and performed other campaign chores for a series of Democrats, including Julian Carroll, Walter "Dee" Huddleston and Martha Layne Collins, who she cites as a mentor." In an interview, she discussed mentoring young women entering politics who may be turned off by going against the good old boy network.

After college, Jones taught at Louisville's Atkinson Elementary School and later coached the University of Louisville women's volleyball team. From 1893 to 1896, she worked as Director of Internal Services in the Kentucky Department of Education, and then the Presbyterian Church (USA) hired her to manage purchasing and printing services. She has since worked as a bank executive, real estate advisor, and small healthcare business owner.

== Memberships ==
Johns was inducted as an honorary member into Delta Kappa Gamma, a society for female educators. She has been affiliated with the American Association of University Women and National Association of Women Business Owners, while being the Kentucky Educational Coordinator for Hands Across America. She has also chaired, worked with, or been the president of several political committees or caucuses.
