= 1978 United States Senate election in Kentucky =

- November 7, 1978
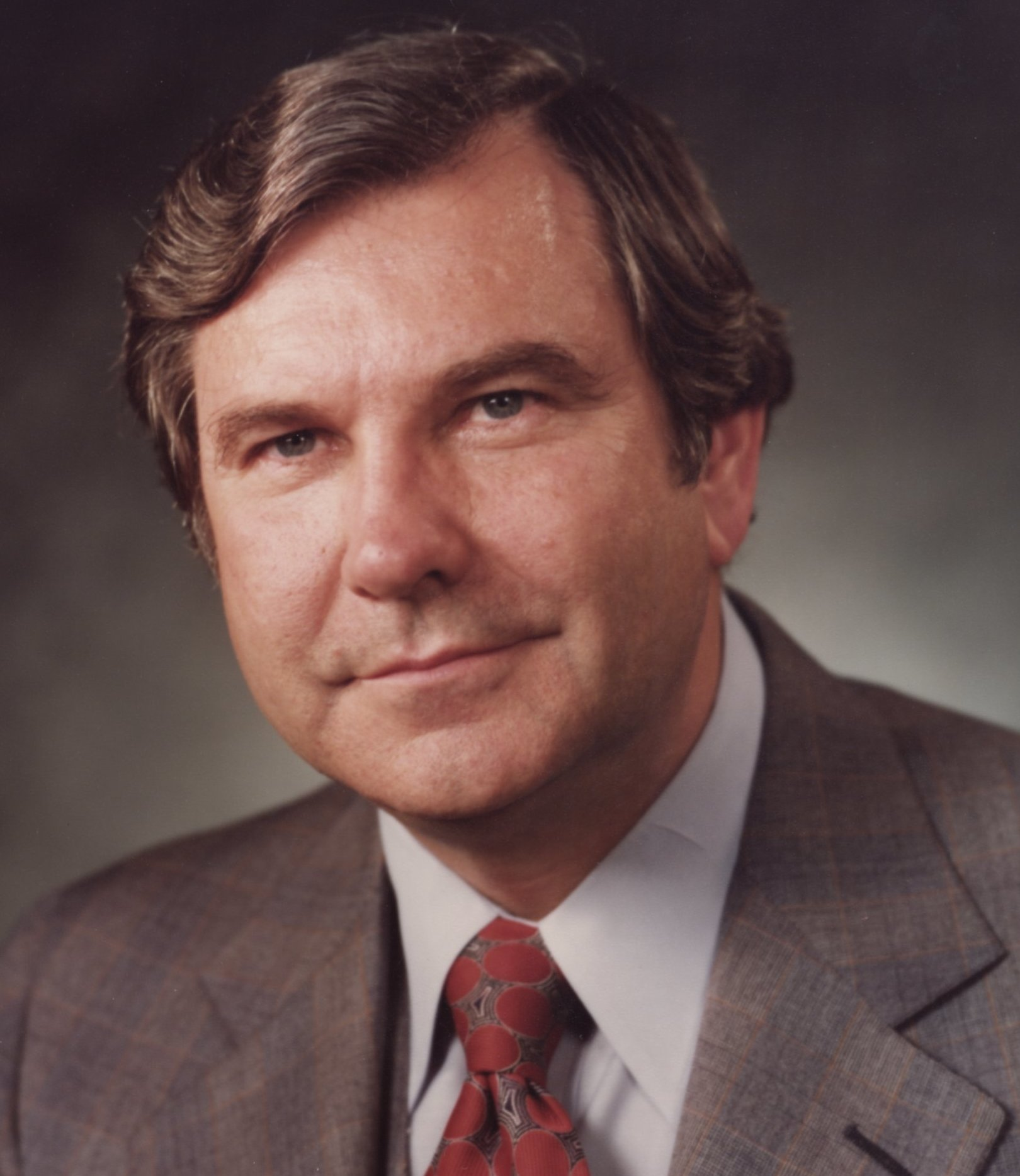

| Nominee | Walter Dee Huddleston | Louie Guenthner Jr. |
| Party | Democratic | Republican |
| Popular vote | 290,730 | 175,766 |
| Percentage | 60.98% | 36.87% |
- County results Huddleston: 40–50% 50–60% 60–70% 70–80% 80–90% Guenthner: 40–50% 50–60% 60–70%
U.S. senator before election
Walter Dee Huddleston
Democratic
Elected U.S. Senator
Walter Dee Huddleston
Democratic

The 1978 United States Senate election in Kentucky took place on November 7, 1978. Incumbent Senator Walter Dee Huddleston won reelection to a second term.

As of 2026, this is the last time a Democrat has won Kentucky's Class 2 Senate seat, which has been held by Mitch McConnell since his victory over Huddleston in 1984.

== Democratic primary ==
=== Candidates ===
- Walter Huddleston, incumbent U.S. Senator
- Jack Watson
- William Taylor
- George Tolhurst

=== Results ===
Democratic primary results
| Party | Candidate | Votes | % |
|---|---|---|---|
| Democratic | Walter Dee Huddleston (incumbent) | 89,333 | 75.62% |
| Democratic | Jack Watson | 13,177 | 11.15% |
| Democratic | William Taylor | 8,710 | 7.37% |
| Democratic | George Tolhurst | 6,921 | 5.86% |

== Republican primary ==
=== Candidates ===
- Louie Guenthner Jr, Member of the Kentucky House of Representatives
- Oline Carmical
- Thurman Jerome Hamlin

=== Results ===
Republican Primary results
| Party | Candidate | Votes | % |
|---|---|---|---|
| Republican | Louie Guenthner Jr. | 14,218 | 47.21% |
| Republican | Oline Carmical | 9,346 | 31.04% |
| Republican | Thurman Jerome Hamlin | 6,550 | 21.75% |

== General election ==
=== Results ===
General election results
| Party | Candidate | Votes | % |
|---|---|---|---|
| Democratic | Walter Dee Huddleston (incumbent) | 290,730 | 60.98% |
| Republican | Louie Guenthner Jr. | 175,766 | 36.87% |
| Democratic hold | | | |

== See also ==
- 1978 United States Senate elections
