= Suhas Kulkarni =

American politician from Kentucky (born 1950)

Member-elect of the Kentucky House of Representatives from the 48th district
- Assuming office January 1, 2027
- Succeeding: Ken Fleming

Director of the Office of Globalization at the Louisville-Jefferson County Metro Government
- In office July 2011 – June 2015
- Preceded by: Office established
- Succeeded by: Bryan Warren

Personal details
- Born: June 3, 1950 (age 76) Jamshedpur, India
- Children: 2, including Nima
- Education: XLRI – Xavier School of Management (MBA)

Suhas Kulkarni (born June 3, 1950) is an American politician and businessman who is currently the member-elect of the Kentucky House of Representatives from Kentucky's 48th House district after flipping the district in the 2026 Kentucky House of Representatives election. He previously served as the first director of the office of globalization of the Louisville Metro Government, and founded his own businesses. He immigrated to the United States from India.

He is the father of Nima Kulkarni, who was elected to the Kentucky House in 2018.

== Background ==
Suhas Kulkarni was born on June 3, 1950, in Jamshedpur, India. He attended the XLRI – Xavier School of Management, where he earned a master's degree in business in 1973, before working for Tata Steel. He remained there until 1986, rising up through ranks to become a division manager.

He and his family decided to immigrate to the United States at that time, seeking supportive education for his older son, who had learning disabilities. His first job in the United States was sweeping the floors of a grocery store, but he went on to run an export business: he later bought the store himself and used it to expand his business. He opened the IT firm Omnisys in 1990, which later became a government contractor.

At age 60, he decided to go into government service and step down from direct management of his company. He became the founding director of the office for globalization, focused on human needs and economic growth to attract immigrants and international companies. In 2015, he was succeeded by Bryan Warren.

== Political career ==
Kulkarni began considering running for the Kentucky General Assembly in 2026 after a bill was proposed by State Representative Shane Baker that would bar naturalized citizens from holding elected office in Kentucky. He ultimately decided to run the night before the filing deadline to unseat Republican incumbent Ken Fleming of Kentucky's 48th House district. He went on to win the Democratic primary with 4,170 votes (72.1%).

The seat's general election was named the only pivotal state legislative election in Kentucky in 2026 by Bolts Magazine. Attack ads alleging he was socialist were aired, which he stated were ridiculous, noting he had "started his own businesses from scratch." He ultimately defeated Fleming, becoming the state representative-elect for the district.

== Personal life ==
He is married and has two children, including Nima Kulkarni, who won a seat in the Kentucky House in 2018. The two are set to serve simultaneously upon Kulkarni taking office in 2027.
