= Kentucky's 40th House of Representatives district =

American legislative district

Kentucky's 40th State House of Representatives district
Representative
Nima Kulkarni; D–Louisville
since January 1, 2019
- Registration: 70.8% Democratic; 17.0% Republican; 11.7% No party preference
- Demographics: 36.8% White; 45.3% Black; 7.4% Hispanic; 1.8% Asian; 0.1% Native American; 0.3% Hawaiian/Pacific Islander; 0.4% Other; 7.9% Multiracial
- Population (2024): 39,235
- Registered voters (2026): 27,264

Kentucky's 40th House of Representatives district is one of 100 districts in the Kentucky House of Representatives. It comprises part of Jefferson County. It has been represented by Nima Kulkarni (D–Louisville) since 2019. As of 2024, the district had a population of 39,235.

== Voter registration ==
On January 1, 2026, the district had 27,264 registered voters, who were registered with the following parties.

Party	Registration	
Party	Voters	%
Democratic	19,302	70.80
Republican	4,628	16.97
Independent	1,217	4.46
Libertarian	98	0.36
Green	30	0.11
Constitution	12	0.04
Socialist Workers	7	0.03
Reform	2	0.01
"Other"	1,968	7.22
Total	27,264	100.00

== List of members representing the district ==
Member	Party	Years	Electoral history	District location
Jerry Bronger (Louisville)	Democratic	January 1, 1980 – July 21, 1992	Elected in 1979. Reelected in 1981. Reelected in 1984. Reelected in 1986. Reelected in 1988. Reelected in 1990. Resigned.	1974–1985; Jefferson County (part).
Jerry Bronger (Louisville)	Democratic	January 1, 1980 – July 21, 1992	Elected in 1979. Reelected in 1981. Reelected in 1984. Reelected in 1986. Reelected in 1988. Reelected in 1990. Resigned.	1985–1993; Jefferson County (part).
Donna Shacklette (Louisville)	Democratic	October 2, 1992 – August 3, 1995	Elected to finish Bronger's term. Reelected in 1992. Reelected in 1994. Resigned.	1985–1993; Jefferson County (part).
Donna Shacklette (Louisville)	Democratic	October 2, 1992 – August 3, 1995	Elected to finish Bronger's term. Reelected in 1992. Reelected in 1994. Resigned.	1993–1997; Jefferson County (part).
Dennis Horlander (Louisville)	Democratic	February 22, 1996 – January 1, 2019	Elected to finish Shacklette's term. Reelected in 1996. Reelected in 1998. Reelected in 2000. Reelected in 2002. Reelected in 2004. Reelected in 2006. Reelected in 2008. Reelected in 2010. Reelected in 2012. Reelected in 2014. Reelected in 2016. Lost renomination.	1993–1997; Jefferson County (part).
Dennis Horlander (Louisville)	Democratic	February 22, 1996 – January 1, 2019	Elected to finish Shacklette's term. Reelected in 1996. Reelected in 1998. Reelected in 2000. Reelected in 2002. Reelected in 2004. Reelected in 2006. Reelected in 2008. Reelected in 2010. Reelected in 2012. Reelected in 2014. Reelected in 2016. Lost renomination.	1997–2003
Dennis Horlander (Louisville)	Democratic	February 22, 1996 – January 1, 2019	Elected to finish Shacklette's term. Reelected in 1996. Reelected in 1998. Reelected in 2000. Reelected in 2002. Reelected in 2004. Reelected in 2006. Reelected in 2008. Reelected in 2010. Reelected in 2012. Reelected in 2014. Reelected in 2016. Lost renomination.	2003–2015
Dennis Horlander (Louisville)	Democratic	February 22, 1996 – January 1, 2019	Elected to finish Shacklette's term. Reelected in 1996. Reelected in 1998. Reelected in 2000. Reelected in 2002. Reelected in 2004. Reelected in 2006. Reelected in 2008. Reelected in 2010. Reelected in 2012. Reelected in 2014. Reelected in 2016. Lost renomination.	2015–2023
Nima Kulkarni (Louisville)	Democratic	January 1, 2019 – present	Elected in 2018. Reelected in 2020. Reelected in 2022. Reelected in 2024. Reelected in 2026.	2015–2023
Nima Kulkarni (Louisville)	Democratic	January 1, 2019 – present	Elected in 2018. Reelected in 2020. Reelected in 2022. Reelected in 2024. Reelected in 2026.	2023–present
