= Eugene P. Stuart =

American politician

Member of the Kentucky Senate from the 36th district
- In office January 1, 1974 – January 1, 1991
- Preceded by: Scott Miller Jr.
- Succeeded by: Susan Johns

Member of the Kentucky House of Representatives from the 48th district
- In office January 1, 1964 – January 1, 1974
- Preceded by: James T. Alexander (redistricting)
- Succeeded by: Louie R. Guenthner Jr.

Personal details
- Born: October 20, 1927 Louisville, Kentucky
- Died: January 27, 2002 (aged 74)
- Party: Republican

Eugene P. Stuart (October 20, 1927 – January 27, 2002) was a Republican and a longtime member of the Kentucky General Assembly. He was the Republican nominee for Lieutenant Governor of Kentucky on a ticket headed by Jim Bunning in 1983.

== Biography ==
Stuart represented the eastern Louisville suburbs of Jefferson County, Kentucky in the Kentucky General Assembly for a total of 26 years, serving in both the Kentucky House of Representatives and the Kentucky Senate. In 1983 Stuart was the Republican nominee for Lieutenant Governor of Kentucky. The Republican ticket that year was headed by Jim Bunning who later was elected to the United States House of Representatives and then the United States Senate. In 1983 both Bunning and Stuart lost to their Democratic opponents. Stuart won 321,352 votes (35.8%) in the general election to 568,869 (63.4%) for Steve Beshear. Beshear carried Stuart's home base of Jefferson County with 116,222 votes there (58.7%) to Stuart's 80,795 (40.1%).

Stuart remained in the state legislature after his statewide defeat and eventually became Minority Leader in the Kentucky Senate.

In 1990, he was defeated for re-election for Kentucky's 36th senate district by Democrat Susan D. Johns, with 20,747 votes (48%) to Johns' 22,416 (52%).

Stuart never again sought public office after his 1990 defeat.

Party political offices
Preceded by Hal Rogers	Republican nominee for Lieutenant Governor of Kentucky; 1983	Succeeded by Lawrence R. Webster
