= Maria Sorolis =

American politician

Member of the Kentucky House of Representatives from the 48th district
- In office January 1, 2019 – January 1, 2021
- Preceded by: Ken Fleming
- Succeeded by: Ken Fleming

Personal details
- Born: December 6, 1960 (age 65) Louisville, Kentucky, U.S.
- Party: Democratic
- Children: 3
- Education: Duke University (BA); University of Georgia (JD)

Maria N. Sorolis (born December 6, 1960) is an American politician who served as a member of the Kentucky House of Representatives from 2019 to 2021.

== Career ==
In 2016, Sorolis ran for election to represent District 48 in the Kentucky House of Representatives, but lost to Republican Ken Fleming. She ran again in 2018 and won. She ran for another term in 2020 and was narrowly defeated by Fleming.

She was a member of the Louisville Metropolitan Caucus, the Kentucky Nonprofit Caucus, and the Women's Caucus.

=== Electoral record ===
2016 Democratic primary: Kentucky House of Representatives, District 48
Party	Candidate	Votes	%
Democratic	Maria Sorolis	4,047	75.46%
Democratic	Steven Sturdevant	1,316	24.54%

2016 general election: Kentucky House of Representatives, District 48
Party	Candidate	Votes	%
Republican	Ken Fleming	15,097	57.18%
Democratic	Maria Sorolis	11,304	42.82%

In 2018, Sorolis was unopposed in the Democratic primary.

2018 general election: Kentucky House of Representatives, District 48
Party	Candidate	Votes	%
Democratic	Maria Sorolis	11,851	50.7%
Republican	Ken Fleming	11,525	49.3%

== Personal life ==
Sorolis earned a Bachelor of Arts in Public Policy from Duke University and a JD from the University of Georgia School of Law. She has three children and lives in Louisville, Kentucky.
