= Donna Shacklette =

American politician

Member of the Kentucky House of Representatives from the 40th district
- In office October 2, 1992 – August 3, 1995
- Preceded by: Jerry Bronger
- Succeeded by: Dennis Horlander

Personal details
- Born: January 10, 1946 (age 80)
- Party: Democratic

Donna B. Shacklette (born January 10, 1946) is an American politician from Kentucky who was a member of the Kentucky House of Representatives from 1992 to 1995. Shacklette was first elected in a September 1992 special election after incumbent representative Jerry Bronger resigned. She resigned from the house in August 1995 for health reasons.
