= Kentucky's 48th House of Representatives district =

American legislative district

Kentucky's 48th State House of Representatives district
Representative
Ken Fleming; R–Louisville
since January 1, 2021
- Registration: 46.3% Republican; 40.7% Democratic; 12.5% No party preference
- Demographics: 86.2% White; 3.0% Black; 2.7% Hispanic; 3.2% Asian; 0.4% Other; 4.5% Multiracial
- Population (2024): 44,675
- Registered voters (2026): 39,275

Kentucky's 48th House of Representatives district is one of 100 districts in the Kentucky House of Representatives. It comprises parts of Jefferson and Oldham Counties. It has been represented by Ken Fleming (R–Louisville) since 2021. He previously represented the district from 2017 to 2019. As of 2024, the district had a population of 44,675.

== Voter registration ==
On January 1, 2026, the district had 39,275 registered voters, who were registered with the following parties.

Party	Registration	
Party	Voters	%
Republican	18,172	46.27
Democratic	15,994	40.72
Independent	2,826	7.20
Libertarian	161	0.41
Green	25	0.06
Constitution	5	0.01
Reform	5	0.01
Socialist Workers	2	0.01
"Other"	2,085	5.31
Total	39,275	100.00

== List of members representing the district ==
Member	Party	Years	Electoral history	District location
Eugene P. Stuart (Louisville)	Republican	January 1, 1964 – January 1, 1974	Elected in 1963. Reelected in 1965. Reelected in 1967. Reelected in 1969. Reelected in 1971. Retired to run for the Kentucky Senate.	1964–1972; Jefferson County (part).
Eugene P. Stuart (Louisville)	Republican	January 1, 1964 – January 1, 1974	Elected in 1963. Reelected in 1965. Reelected in 1967. Reelected in 1969. Reelected in 1971. Retired to run for the Kentucky Senate.	1972–1974; Jefferson County (part).
Louie Guenthner (Louisville)	Republican	January 1, 1974 – January 1, 1989	Elected in 1973. Reelected in 1975. Reelected in 1977. Reelected in 1979. Reelected in 1981. Reelected in 1984. Reelected in 1986. Lost renomination.	1974–1985; Jefferson County (part).
Louie Guenthner (Louisville)	Republican	January 1, 1974 – January 1, 1989	Elected in 1973. Reelected in 1975. Reelected in 1977. Reelected in 1979. Reelected in 1981. Reelected in 1984. Reelected in 1986. Lost renomination.	1985–1993; Jefferson County (part).
Susan Stokes (Louisville)	Republican	January 1, 1989 – January 1, 1993	Elected in 1988. Reelected in 1990. Retired to run for Kentucky's; 3rd congressional district.	1985–1993; Jefferson County (part).
Bob DeWeese (Louisville)	Republican	January 1, 1993 – January 1, 2017	Elected in 1992. Reelected in 1994. Reelected in 1996. Reelected in 1998. Reelected in 2000. Reelected in 2002. Reelected in 2004. Reelected in 2006. Reelected in 2008. Reelected in 2010. Reelected in 2012. Reelected in 2014. Retired.	1993–1997; Jefferson County (part).
Bob DeWeese (Louisville)	Republican	January 1, 1993 – January 1, 2017	Elected in 1992. Reelected in 1994. Reelected in 1996. Reelected in 1998. Reelected in 2000. Reelected in 2002. Reelected in 2004. Reelected in 2006. Reelected in 2008. Reelected in 2010. Reelected in 2012. Reelected in 2014. Retired.	1997–2003
Bob DeWeese (Louisville)	Republican	January 1, 1993 – January 1, 2017	Elected in 1992. Reelected in 1994. Reelected in 1996. Reelected in 1998. Reelected in 2000. Reelected in 2002. Reelected in 2004. Reelected in 2006. Reelected in 2008. Reelected in 2010. Reelected in 2012. Reelected in 2014. Retired.	2003–2015
Bob DeWeese (Louisville)	Republican	January 1, 1993 – January 1, 2017	Elected in 1992. Reelected in 1994. Reelected in 1996. Reelected in 1998. Reelected in 2000. Reelected in 2002. Reelected in 2004. Reelected in 2006. Reelected in 2008. Reelected in 2010. Reelected in 2012. Reelected in 2014. Retired.	2015–2023
Ken Fleming (Louisville)	Republican	January 1, 2017 – January 1, 2019	Elected in 2016. Lost reelection.	2015–2023
Maria Sorolis (Louisville)	Democratic	January 1, 2019 – January 1, 2021	Elected in 2018. Lost reelection.	2015–2023
Ken Fleming (Louisville)	Republican	January 1, 2021 – present	Elected in 2020. Reelected in 2022. Reelected in 2024. Lost reelection.	2015–2023
Ken Fleming (Louisville)	Republican	January 1, 2021 – present	Elected in 2020. Reelected in 2022. Reelected in 2024. Lost reelection.	2023–present
Suhas Kulkarni (Louisville)	Democratic	Assuming office January 1, 2027	Elected in 2026.	2023–present
