= Dennis Horlander =

American politician

Member of the Kentucky House of Representatives from the 40th district
- In office February 22, 1996 – January 1, 2019
- Preceded by: Donna Shacklette
- Succeeded by: Nima Kulkarni

Personal details
- Born: September 6, 1952 (age 74)
- Party: Democratic
- Education: University of Louisville
- Website: dennishorlander.com

Dennis Lee Horlander (born September 6, 1952) is an American politician and a Democratic member of the Kentucky House of Representatives who represented District 40 from February 1996 to January 2019. Horlander was first elected to the house in a February special election following the resignation of incumbent Donna Shacklette. He was defeated for renomination in 2018 by Nima Kulkarni.

== Education ==
Horlander attended the University of Louisville.

== Elections ==
- 2012 Horlander was unopposed for the May 22, 2012 Democratic Primary and won the November 6, 2012 General election with 11,039 votes against a write-in candidate.
- 1996 Horlander won the five-way 1996 Democratic Primary and won the November 5, 1996 General election against Republican nominee Kim Jefferson.
- 1998 Horlander was unopposed for both the 1998 Democratic Primary and the November 3, 1998 General election.
- 2000 Horlander was unopposed for both the 2000 Democratic Primary and the November 7, 2000 General election, winning with 8,998 votes.
- 2002 Horlander was challenged in the 2002 Democratic Primary, winning with 2,269 votes (76.6%) and was unopposed for the November 5, 2002 General election, winning with 6,609 votes.
- 2004 Horlander was unopposed for both the 2004 Democratic Primary and the November 2, 2004 General election, winning with 10,632 votes.
- 2006 Horlander was unopposed for both the 2006 Democratic Primary and the November 7, 2006 General election, winning with 6,871 votes.
- 2008 Horlander was unopposed for both the 2008 Democratic Primary and the November 4, 2008 General election, winning with 11,698 votes.
- 2010 Horlander was unopposed for both the May 18, 2010 Democratic Primary and the November 2, 2010 General election, winning with 7,293 votes.
- 2018 Horlander lost the Democratic Primary to Nima Kulkarni, who went on to win the general election.
