= Nima Kulkarni =

American politician

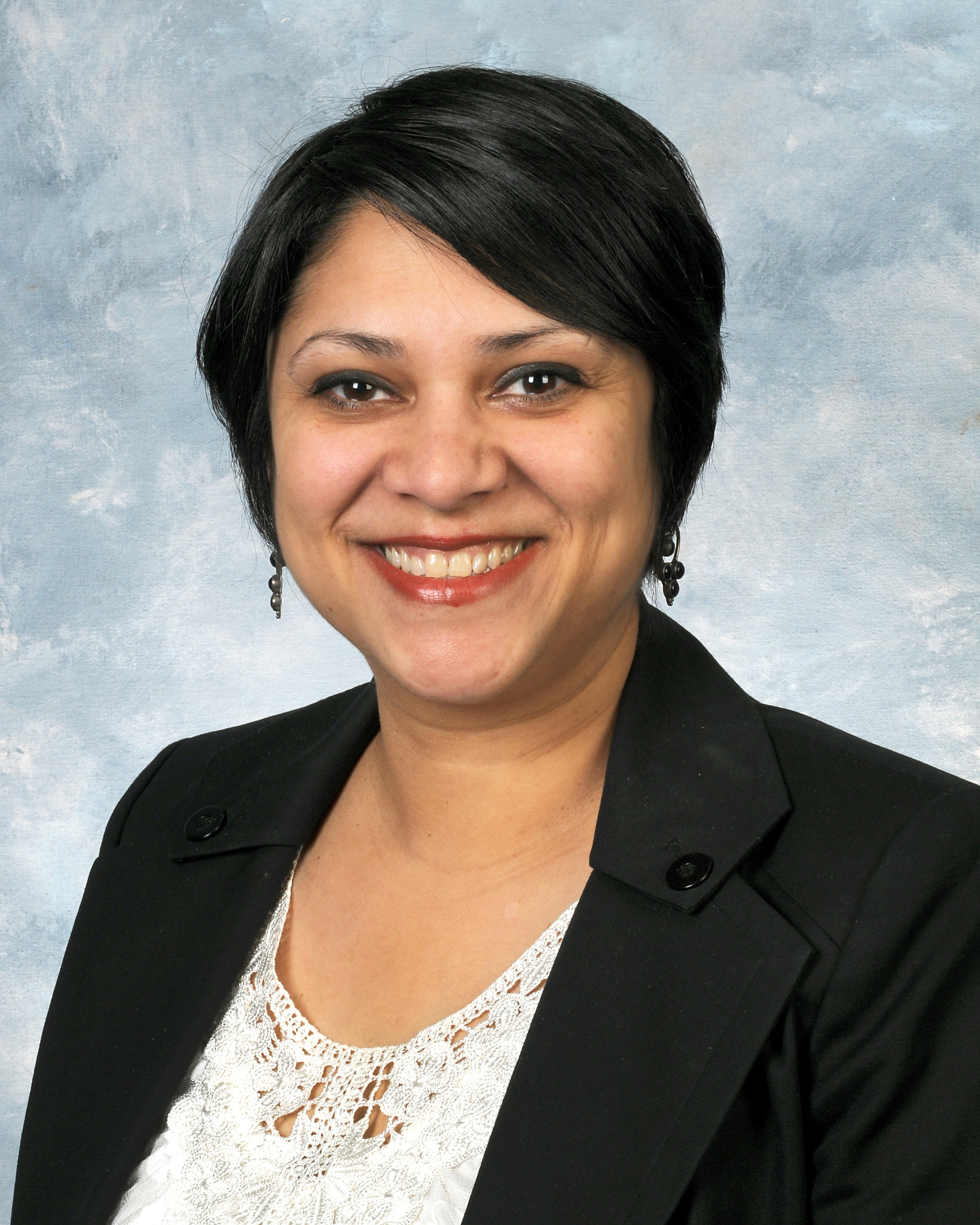

Member of the Kentucky House of Representatives from the 40th district
- Incumbent
- Assumed office January 1, 2019
- Preceded by: Dennis Horlander

Personal details
- Born: December 23, 1978 (age 47) India
- Party: Democratic
- Parent(s): Suhas Kulkarni and Surekha Kulkarni
- Education: University of Louisville (BA, MBA); University of the District of Columbia (JD)
- Website: https://www.votenima.com/

Nirupama Kulkarni (born December 23, 1978) is an American immigration attorney and politician who has served as member of the Kentucky House of Representatives from Kentucky's 40th House district since January 2019.

She is the first foreign-born Indian-American member elected to the Kentucky General Assembly.

== Early life and education ==
Kulkarni was born in India and moved to the United States at the age of six. Her parents, Suhas and Surekha, sought to provide better educational opportunities for their two children, Nima and Nikhil. Kulkarni was educated in the Jefferson County Public School system before earning a Bachelor of Arts degree in English Literature and a Master of Business Administration degree from the University of Louisville. She earned her Juris Doctor at the University of the District of Columbia David A. Clarke School of Law.

== Legal career and community involvement ==
Kulkarni founded the Indus Law Firm in 2010 which specializes in immigration and employment law. In 2013, the firm was honored by Business First in its 40 Under 40 List.

Additionally, Kulkarni is the founder of the New Americans Initiative, a nonprofit operating in Louisville, which seeks to educate and assist Kentucky's immigrant population.

== Political career ==
=== 2018 Kentucky House election ===
In 2018, Kulkarni challenged incumbent Dennis Horlander for Kentucky's 40th House district, campaigning on a platform of raising the minimum wage, protecting pensions, instituting immigration reform, supporting education, and providing healthcare to all Kentuckians. Kulkarni defeated Horlander in the Democratic primary, and won the general election that November against Republican nominee Joshua Neubert.

=== Tenure ===
While in office, Kulkarni has sponsored legislation related to higher wages, improving healthcare coverage, police reform, and education. She also proposed a bill in 2020 with the goal of providing improved protections to victims of domestic or sexual assault. Her father Suhas also won a seat in the state legislature in 2026.

== Electoral history ==
=== 2018 ===
Democratic primary results
Party	Candidate	Votes	%
Democratic	Nima Kulkarni	1,642	46.6
Democratic	Dennis L. Horlander (incumbent)	894	25.4
Democratic	Logan Gatti	541	15.4
Democratic	Kelly Gibson	447	12.7
Total votes		3,524	100.0

2018 Kentucky House of Representatives 40th district election
Party	Candidate	Votes	%
Democratic	Nima Kulkarni	8,619	74.2
Republican	Joshua Neubert	3,004	25.8
Total votes		11,623	100.0
Democratic hold			

=== 2020 ===
Democratic primary results
Party	Candidate	Votes	%
Democratic	Nima Kulkarni (incumbent)	5,632	78.5
Democratic	Dennis Horlander	1,538	21.5
Total votes		7,170	100.0

2020 Kentucky House of Representatives 40th district election
Party	Candidate	Votes	%
Democratic	Nima Kulkarni (incumbent)	Unopposed	
Total votes		12,446	100.0
Democratic hold			

=== 2022 ===
2022 Kentucky House of Representatives 40th district election
Party	Candidate	Votes	%
Democratic	Nima Kulkarni (incumbent)	Unopposed	
Total votes		7,318	100.0
Democratic hold			

=== 2024 ===
Democratic primary results (unofficial)
Party	Candidate	Votes	%
Democratic	Nima Kulkarni (incumbent)	2,006	78.0
Democratic	William Zeitz	565	22.0
Total votes		2,571	100.0

2024 Kentucky House of Representatives 40th district election
Party	Candidate	Votes	%
Democratic	Nima Kulkarni (incumbent)	Unopposed	
Total votes		10,293	100.0
Democratic hold			
