= Louie R. Guenthner Jr. =

American politician

Member of the Kentucky House of Representatives from the 48th district
- In office January 1, 1974 – January 1, 1989
- Preceded by: Eugene P. Stuart
- Succeeded by: Susan Stokes

Personal details
- Born: August 9, 1944
- Died: August 7, 2012 (aged 67) Louisville, Kentucky, U.S.
- Party: Republican
- Occupation: Attorney, Politician

Louis Robert Guenthner Jr. (August 9, 1944 – August 7, 2012), was an attorney from Louisville, Kentucky, who was a Republican former member of the Kentucky House of Representatives, having represented the 48th District in Jefferson County from 1974 to 1989. The district included the affluent areas of Indian Hills and Prospect. He was defeated in the 1988 primary election for re-nomination to the state House by his fellow Republican, Susan Stokes. He had two children, Melissa Guenthner (now Atkins) and Louis Robert Guenthner, III. He was married to Betty Guenthner, who died in 2007.

Guenthner was the Republican nominee in the 1978 United States Senate election in Kentucky; he lost to the incumbent Democrat Walter Dee Huddleston. Six years later, Mitch McConnell, also of Jefferson County, upset Huddleston, who then became a Washington, D.C.–based lobbyist. Guenthner also made an unsuccessful run for Jefferson County judge-executive in 1985.

Party political offices
Preceded by Louie B. Nunn	Republican nominee for United States Senator for Kentucky (Class 2); 1978	Succeeded by Mitch McConnell
