= Ken Fleming (politician) =

American politician (born 1960)

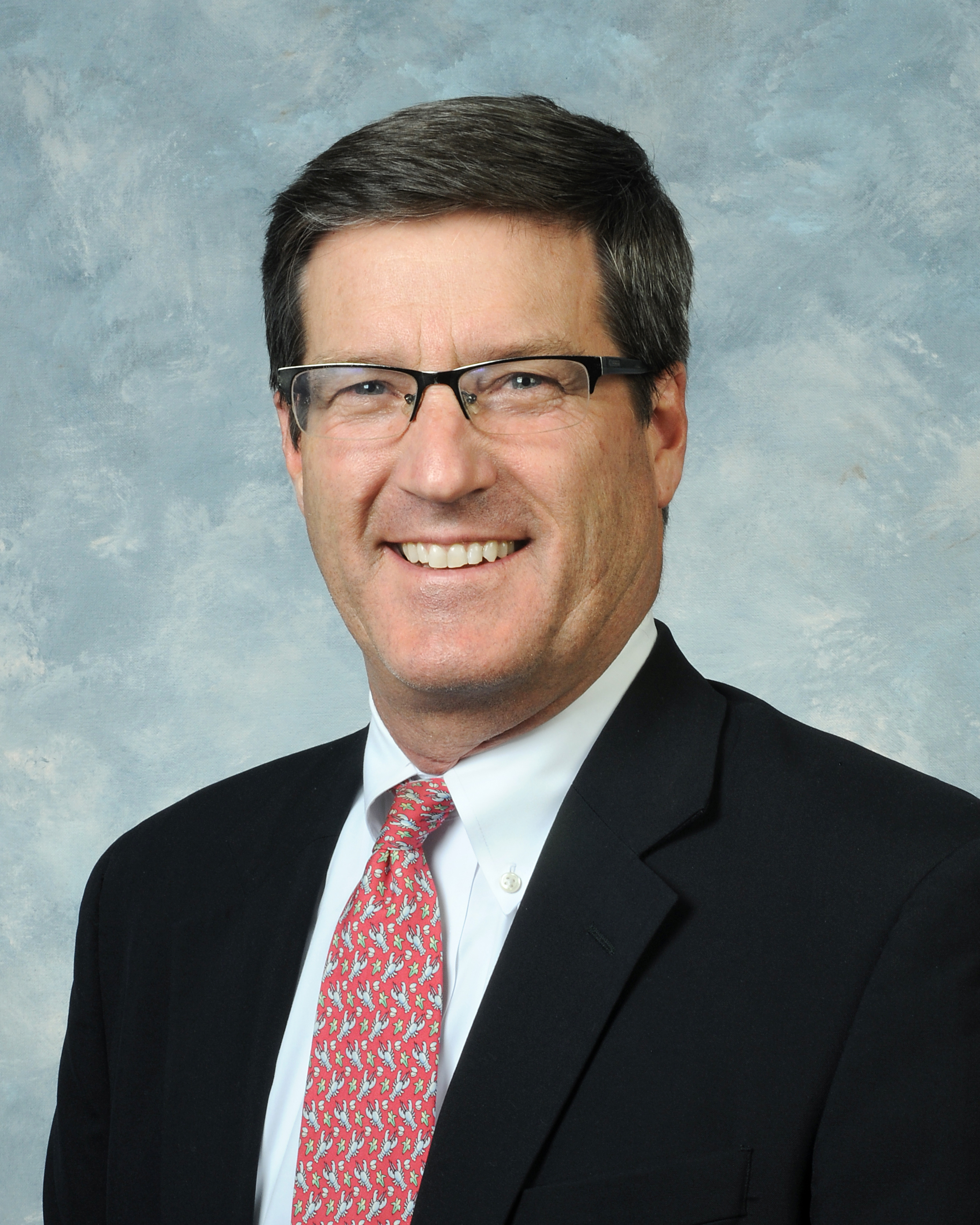

Member of the Kentucky House of Representatives from the 48th district
- Incumbent
- Assumed office January 1, 2021
- Preceded by: Maria Sorolis
- In office January 1, 2017 – January 1, 2019
- Preceded by: Bob DeWeese
- Succeeded by: Maria Sorolis

Member of the Louisville Metro Council from the 7th district
- In office January 2003 – January 2015
- Preceded by: Office established
- Succeeded by: Angela Leet

Personal details
- Born: December 27, 1960 (age 65)
- Party: Republican
- Children: 2
- Education: University of Kentucky (BBA)
- Committees: Budget Review Subcommittee on Health & Family Services (Chair); Appropriations & Revenue; Health Services; Local Government; Primary and Secondary Education

Kenneth Coleman Fleming (born December 27, 1960) is an American politician and Republican member of the Kentucky House of Representatives from Kentucky's 48th House district. His district comprises parts of Jefferson and Oldham counties. Fleming was previously a member of the Louisville Metro Council from 2003 to 2015 and the House from 2017 to 2019. Fleming was defeated for reelection in 2026, losing to Democratic candidate Suhas Kulkarni.

== Early life ==
Fleming graduated from Ballard High School in Louisville before earning a Bachelor of Business Administration from the University of Kentucky. During his time at UK, Fleming was a member of Sigma Alpha Epsilon and president of the interfraternity council.

Prior to entering politics, Fleming worked in various managerial and executive level positions related to banking and geographical mapping including his family's own surveying and mapping company. Currently, he serves as the executive director of Kilgore Samaritan Counseling Center, a faith-based non-profit located in Louisville, Kentucky.

== Political career ==
=== Louisville Metro Council ===
Fleming served as a member of the Louisville Metro Council from its formation in 2003 until 2015. During his tenure he served as chair of the republican caucus as well as chair of the transportation, contracts and appointments, and government oversight and ethics committees.

=== Elections ===
- 2016 Incumbent representative Bob Deweese chose not to seek reelection for Kentucky's 48th House district. Fleming was unopposed in the 2016 Republican primary and won the 2016 Kentucky House of Representatives election with 15,097 votes (57.1%) against Democratic candidate Maria Sorolis.
- 2018 Fleming was unopposed in the 2018 Republican primary and was defeated in the 2018 Kentucky House of Representatives election, garnering 11,525 votes (49.3%) against Democratic candidate Maria Sorolis.
- 2020 Fleming was unopposed in the 2020 Republican primary and won the 2020 Kentucky House of Representatives election with 15,677 votes (51.1%) against incumbent Democratic representative Maria Sorolis.
- 2022 Fleming was unopposed in the 2022 Republican primary and won the 2022 Kentucky House of Representatives election with 12,334 votes (54.2%) against Democratic candidate Maria Sorolis.
- 2024 Fleming was unopposed in the 2024 Republican primary and won the 2024 Kentucky House of Representatives election with 15,195 votes (53.7%) against Democratic candidate Kate Farrow.
