= Jerry Bronger =

American politician

Member of the Kentucky House of Representatives from the 40th district
- In office January 1, 1980 – July 21, 1992
- Preceded by: George R. Siemens
- Succeeded by: Donna Shacklette

Personal details
- Born: December 1, 1935
- Died: September 29, 2016 (aged 80)
- Party: Democratic

John Gerard Bronger (December 1, 1935 – September 29, 2016) was an American politician from Kentucky who was a member of the Kentucky House of Representatives from 1980 to 1992. Bronger was first elected in 1979 following the retirement of incumbent representative George R. Siemens. He resigned from the house on July 21, 1992, following his conviction for bribery in Operation Boptrot.

Bronger died on September 29, 2016.
