= Scott Brinkman =

American politician

Member of the Kentucky House of Representatives from the 32nd district
- In office January 1, 2001 – January 1, 2011
- Preceded by: Susan Johns
- Succeeded by: Julie Raque Adams

Personal details
- Born: February 10, 1955 (age 71)
- Party: Republican

Scott William Brinkman (born February 10, 1955) is an American politician from Kentucky who was a member of the Kentucky House of Representatives from 2001 to 2011. Brinkman was first elected in 2000, defeating Democratic incumbent Susan Johns. He did not seek reelection in 2010 and was succeeded by Julie Raque Adams.
