= Susan Stokes (politician) =

American politician

Member of the Kentucky House of Representatives from the 48th district
- In office January 1, 1989 – January 1, 1993
- Preceded by: Louie R. Guenthner Jr.
- Succeeded by: Bob DeWeese

Personal details
- Born: June 30, 1942 (age 84)
- Party: Republican

Susan B. Stokes (born June 30, 1942) is an American politician from Kentucky who was a member of the Kentucky House of Representatives from 1989 to 1993. Stokes was first elected in 1988, defeating incumbent representative Louie R. Guenthner Jr. for renomination. She left the house to unsuccessfully run for Kentucky's 3rd congressional district in 1992. She ran again in 1994, losing to Democratic candidate Mike Ward.
