= Bob DeWeese (politician) =

American politician (1934–2020)

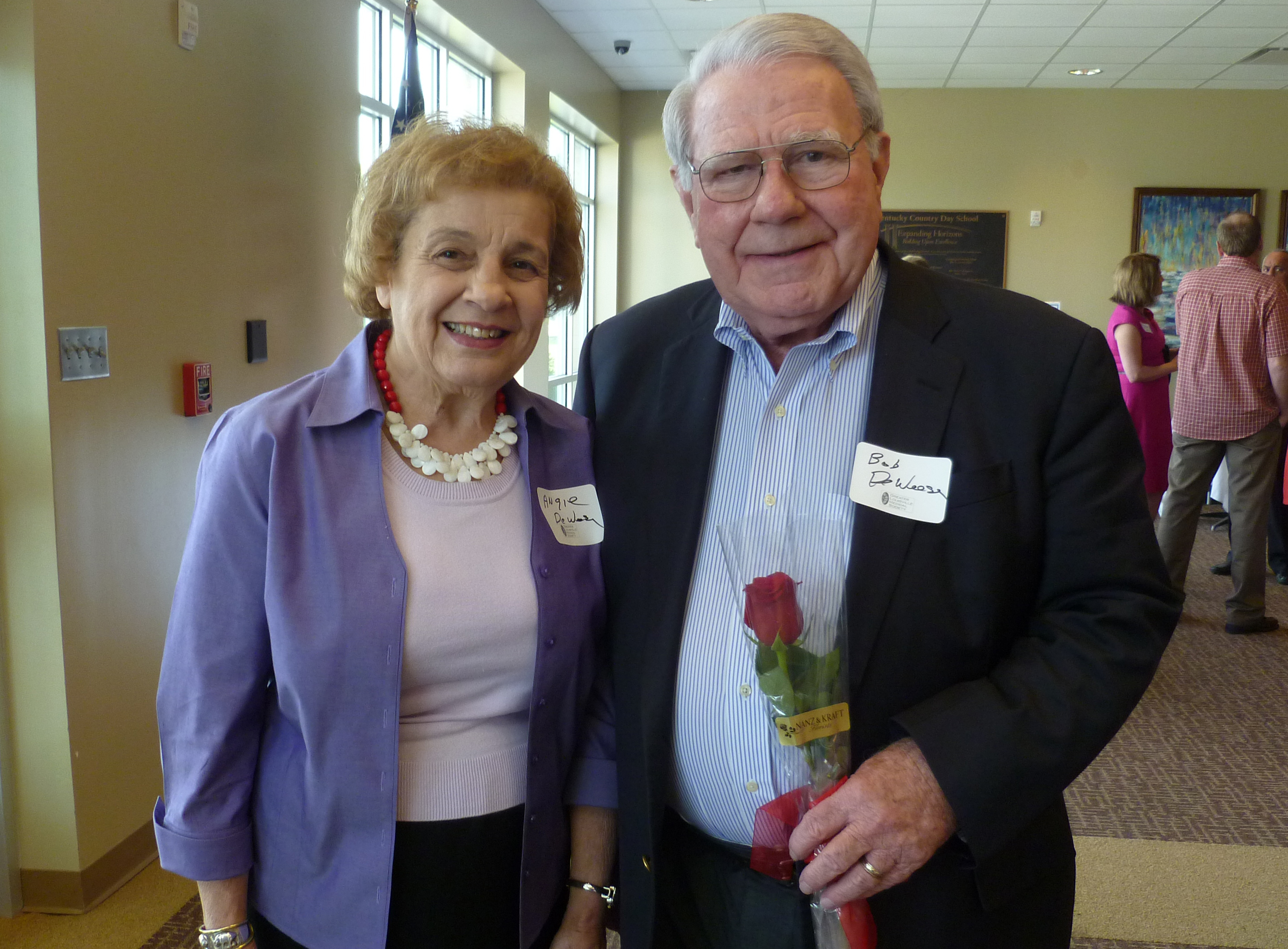
- Bob DeWeese (right) with his wife Angie in 2013

Member of the Kentucky House of Representatives from the 48th district
- In office January 1, 1993 – January 1, 2017
- Preceded by: Susan Stokes
- Succeeded by: Ken Fleming

Personal details
- Born: November 8, 1934 LaCenter, Kentucky, U.S.
- Died: November 25, 2020 (aged 86)
- Party: Republican
- Spouse: Angie DeWeese
- Occupation: Politician, surgeon

Bobby Miller DeWeese (November 8, 1934 – November 25, 2020) was an American politician and physician who served as a Republican member of the Kentucky House of Representatives from 1993 to 2017, representing the 48th district.

DeWeese was first elected to the house in 1992 when incumbent representative Susan Stokes retired to run for congress. He did not seek reelection in 2016.

He was the Republican Minority Caucus Chair. DeWeese attended the University of Kentucky for a Bachelor of Science degree, and the University of Louisville for his M.D. He was a general surgeon and both a member and president of the Jefferson County Medical Society, in addition to the Kentucky and American Medical Association. He received the Dr. Nathan Davis Award from the American Medical Association. He is married to Angela for 62 years and had four children.

Committees he served on:

- Appropriations and Revenue Committee
- House Budget Review Subcommittee on Human Resources
- House Economic Development Committee
- House Health and Welfare Committee
- House Rules Committee
- Legislative Research Commission Committee
- Medicaid Oversight and Advisory Committee

DeWeese died on November 25, 2020, at the age of 86.
