= Walter Dee Huddleston =

American politician (1926–2018)

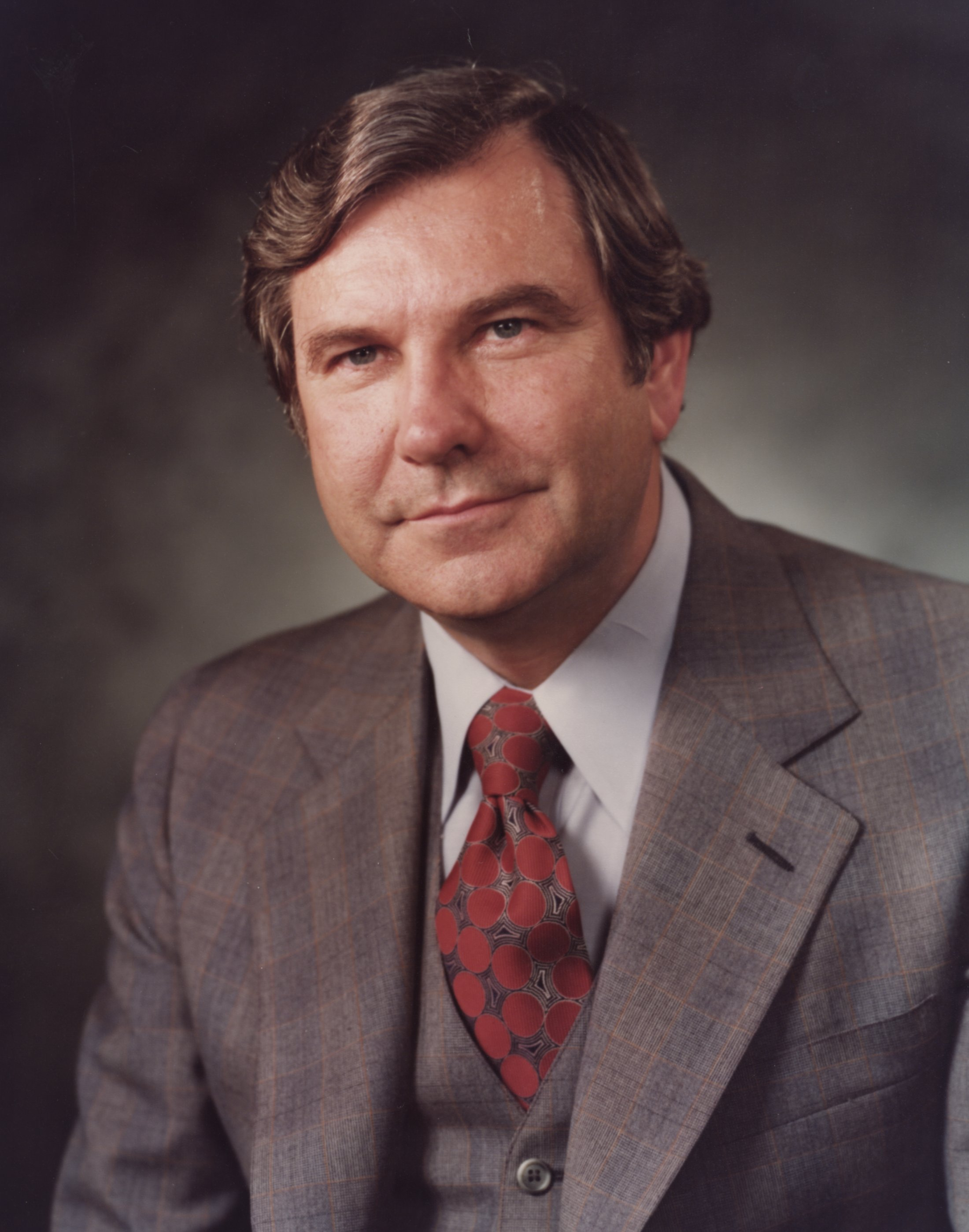

United States Senator from Kentucky
- In office January 3, 1973 – January 3, 1985
- Preceded by: John Sherman Cooper
- Succeeded by: Mitch McConnell

Majority Leader of the Kentucky Senate
- In office January 1970 – December 1972
- Preceded by: Richard Frymire
- Succeeded by: Tom Garrett

Member of the Kentucky Senate from the 10th district
- In office January 1, 1966 – December 1972
- Preceded by: Paul Fuqua
- Succeeded by: Joe Prather

Personal details
- Born: Walter Darlington Huddleston; April 15, 1926 Burkesville, Kentucky, U.S.
- Died: October 16, 2018 (aged 92) Warsaw, Kentucky, U.S.
- Party: Democratic
- Spouse: Martha Jean Pearce (m. 1947; died 2003)
- Children: 2
- Education: University of Kentucky (BA)

Military service
- Allegiance: United States
- Branch/service: United States Army
- Years of service: 1944–1946
- Battles/wars: World War II

Walter Darlington "Dee" Huddleston (April 15, 1926 – October 16, 2018) was an American commercial broadcaster and politician from Kentucky. A member of the Democratic Party, he served as a member of the Kentucky Senate representing Kentucky's 10th Senate district from 1966 to 1972 and as a member of the United States Senate for two terms from 1973 to 1985. He was defeated for re-election in 1984 by Mitch McConnell by 5,269 votes.

== Early life ==
Huddleston was born on April 15, 1926, in Burkesville, Kentucky. He was one of the nine children of Walter Franklin Huddleston and Lottie Belle Russell. His father was a Methodist preacher. After he graduated from high school, he enlisted in the United States Army and served as a tank gunner in Europe during and after World War II from 1944 to 1946. He then attended the University of Kentucky with support from the G.I. Bill, and he then graduated in 1949. On December 20, 1947, Huddleston married the former Martha Jean Pearce at Duncan Memorial Chapel in Oldham County, Kentucky. Together, they had two sons, Stephen Huddleston and Philip Huddleston (died April 10, 2022); as well as three granddaughters. Martha Jean Huddleston died on August 18, 2003.

After graduating from college, Huddleston worked as the sports and program director for WKCT in Bowling Green, Kentucky. In 1952, he became the general manager of WIEL in Elizabethtown, Kentucky. He later became president of the Kentucky Broadcasters Association.

== Career ==
Huddleston entered politics in 1964 when he was elected to the Kentucky State Senate. He was elected as a state senator in 1965, serving until 1972; for a time, he was the body's majority leader. On June 15, 1972, Huddleston was one of 20 Democratic senators that voted for Kentucky to ratify the Equal Rights Amendment.

=== U.S. Senate ===
In 1972, Huddleston ran for the United States Senate seat which was being vacated by retiring Republican U.S. Senator John Sherman Cooper. He narrowly defeated Republican Louie Nunn, who was Governor of Kentucky from 1967 to 1971, receiving a 51% to 48% margin. Huddleston ran the campaign by repeatedly faulting Nunn for raising the sales tax when was governor. Huddleston was reelected in 1978 with 61 percent of the vote over the former Republican Kentucky House of Representatives member Louie R. Guenthner Jr. of Louisville, Kentucky.

During his Senate Career, Huddleston supported the Equal Rights Amendment to prohibit sex discrimination, but was critical of abortion rights. He endorsed voluntary school prayers and Kentucky products like tobacco, bourbon and coal. He supported price control through shifting some of the price to the farmers. He also voiced opposition to excessive drinking labels. He supported the 1977 treaty which ceded the canal to Panama and wished to limit covert intelligence operations.

=== 1984 campaign vs. Mitch McConnell ===
In 1984, Huddleston's Republican opponent was Jefferson County, Kentucky (Louisville) Judge-Executive Mitch McConnell. McConnell gained political traction with a series of television campaign ads mocking Huddleston's attendance record in the Senate. McConnell accused him of putting "his private speaking engagements ahead of his Senate responsibilities". Despite these ads, the race was very close, with McConnell only defeating Huddleston when the last returns came in (49.9% to 49.5%). The challenger was aided by incumbent Republican President of the United States Ronald Reagan's 20-point victory in the Commonwealth over Democratic challenger Walter Mondale of Minnesota, a member of the U.S. Senate from 1964 to 1976 who was Vice President of the United States from 1977 to 1981, in the concurrent presidential election.

== Post-Senate career ==
As was typical of party members from Kentucky, Huddleston was known as a member of the moderate wing of the Democratic Party.

After his retirement, Huddleston returned to Elizabethtown, Kentucky, and began working as a lobbyist for railroad, tobacco and agricultural clients. He also lobbied in behalf of Louisville-based health insurance company Humana and Capitol Holding, a parent of Commonwealth Life Insurance.

In the late 1980s, Huddleston served on the National Board of Advisors of the Federation for American Immigration Reform, an anti-immigration group advocating for a lower rate of legal immigration.

In 2012, Huddleston announced he was stepping down as chairman of First Financial Service Corporation.

== Death ==
Huddleston died in his sleep on October 16, 2018, at the home of his son, Stephen Huddleston, in Warsaw, Kentucky, where he lived for the last one year and two months of his life, age 92. Mitch McConnell, who had later risen to the highest ranks in the United States Senate leadership, released a statement paying tribute to Huddleston's "tenacity", and stated that both he and his wife, Elaine Chao, were "saddened" when they heard of his passing. He was interred at Elizabethtown Cemetery in the town of Elizabethtown, Kentucky.

Party political offices
Preceded by John Y. Brown Sr.	Democratic nominee for U.S. Senator from Kentucky (Class 2); 1972, 1978, 1984	Succeeded by Harvey I. Sloane
Preceded by Les AuCoin, Joe Biden, Bill Bradley, Robert Byrd, Tom Daschle, Bill Hefner, Barbara B. Kennelly, George Miller, Tip O'Neill, Paul Tsongas, Tim Wirth	Response to the State of the Union address 1984; Served alongside: Max Baucus, Joe Biden, David Boren, Barbara Boxer, Robert Byrd, Dante Fascell, William H. Gray, Tom Harkin, Carl Levin, Tip O'Neill, Claiborne Pell	Succeeded by Bill Clinton; Bob Graham; Tip O'Neill
U.S. Senate
Preceded by John Sherman Cooper	U.S. Senator (Class 2) from Kentucky; 1973–1985; Served alongside: Marlow Cook, Wendell Ford	Succeeded by Mitch McConnell
Preceded by Jesse Helms	Ranking Member of the Senate Agriculture Committee; 1981–1985	Succeeded by Edward Zorinsky
