= 1984 United States Senate election in Kentucky =

- November 6, 1984
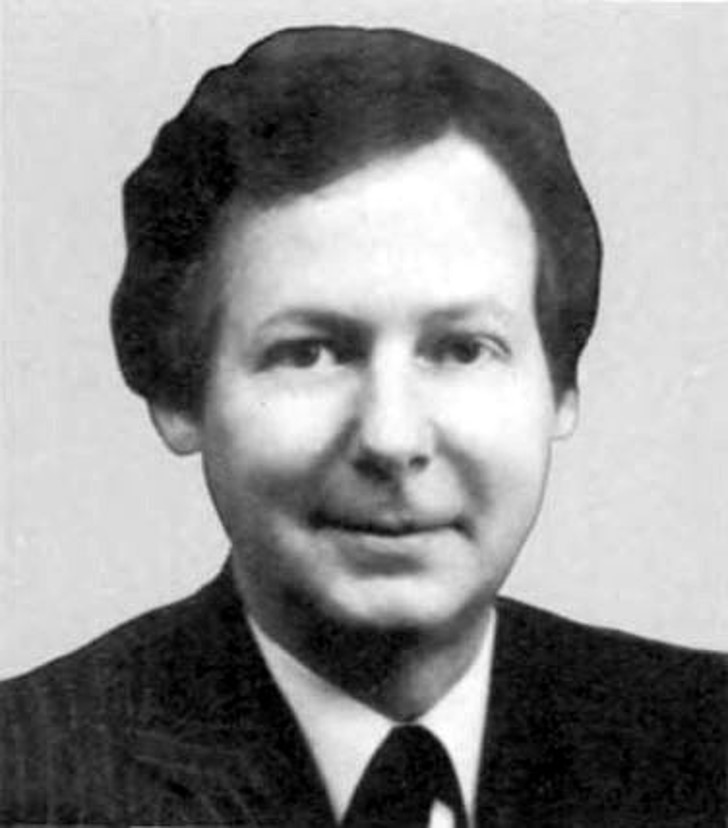

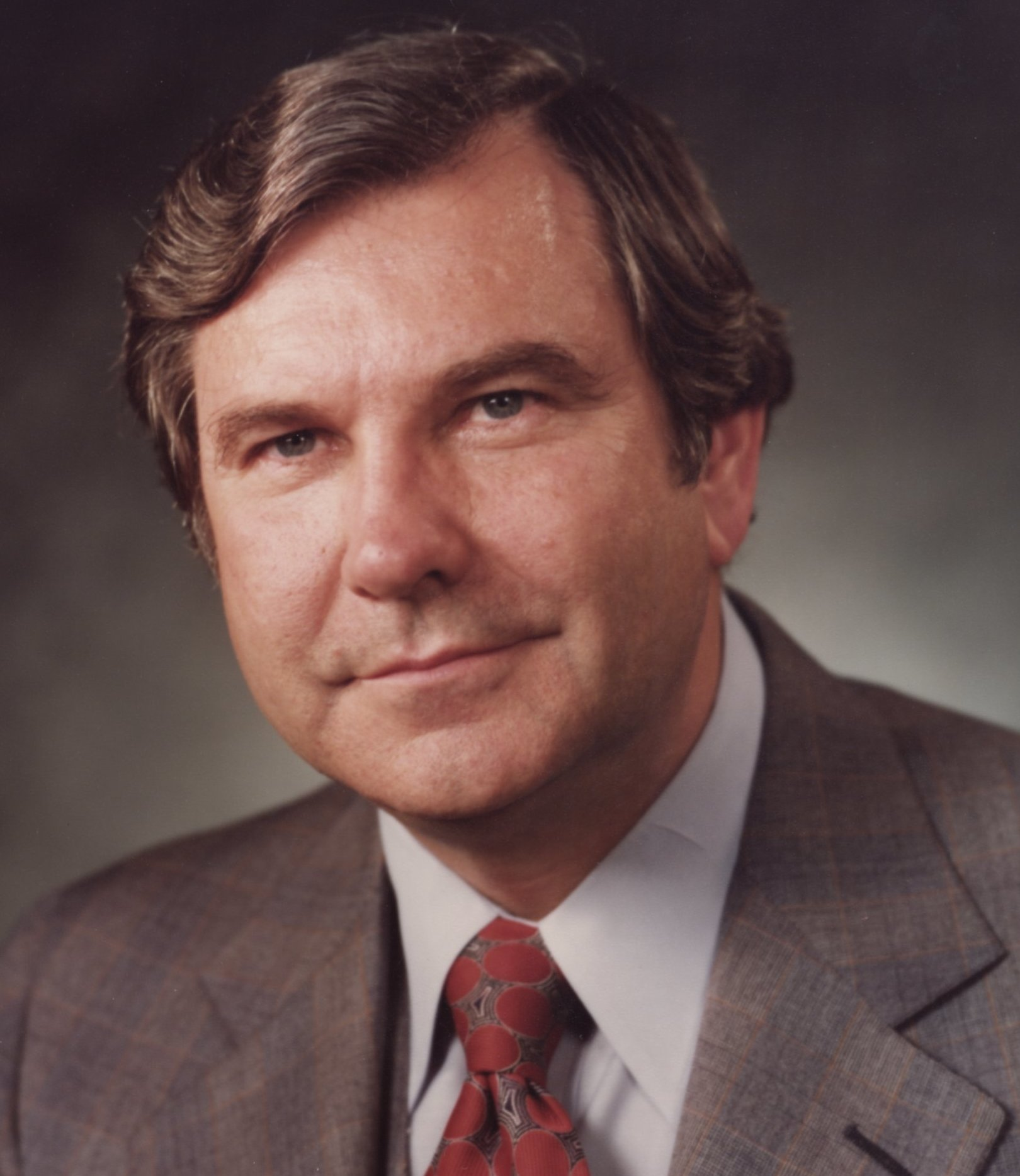
Nominee	Mitch McConnell	Walter Dee Huddleston
Party	Republican	Democratic
Popular vote	644,990	639,721
Percentage	49.90%	49.50%
- McConnell: 50–60% 60–70% 70–80% 80–90% >90% Huddleston: 50–60% 60–70% 70–80% 80–90% >90% Tie No Votes
U.S. senator before election
Walter Huddleston
Democratic
Elected U.S. Senator
Mitch McConnell
Republican

The 1984 United States Senate election in Kentucky was held on November 5, 1984. Incumbent Democratic Senator Walter Dee Huddleston lost re-election to a third term to Mitch McConnell, who would go on to be Senate Majority Leader, by less than 0.5%. This is the last time a Senator from Kentucky lost re-election.

Despite Ronald Reagan winning nationwide in a landslide in the concurrent presidential election (even carrying Kentucky by a 20% margin), this was the only Republican flip of the 1984 Senate elections, and Huddleston significantly outperformed Democratic nominee Walter Mondale's margin of defeat in the concurrent presidential race.

== Democratic primary ==
=== Candidates ===
- Walter Dee Huddleston, incumbent U.S. Senator

=== Results ===
Huddleston was unopposed in the Democratic Party's primary. Governor John Y. Brown Jr. filed to run in March 1984, but withdrew for health reasons a few weeks later.

== Republican primary ==
=== Candidates ===
- Mitch McConnell, Jefferson County Executive
- Roger Harker
- Tommy Klein, perennial candidate
- Thurman Jerome Hamlin, perennial candidate

=== Results ===
Republican primary results
Party	Candidate	Votes	%
Republican	Mitch McConnell	39,465	79.22%
Republican	C. Roger Harker	3,798	7.62%
Republican	Tommy Klein	3,352	6.73%
Republican	Thurman Jerome Hamlin	3,202	6.43%
Total votes		49,817	100.00%

== General election ==
=== Candidates ===
- Walter Dee Huddleston (D), incumbent U.S. Senator
- Mitch McConnell (R), Jefferson County Executive
- Dave Welters (SW)

=== Fundraising ===
Campaign finance reports as of December 31, 1984
Candidate	Raised	Spent	Cash on hand
Mitch McConnell (R)	$1,591,303	$1,776,128	$27,443
Walter Huddleston (D)	$2,420,771	$2,444,091	$3,138
Source: Federal Election Commission

=== Campaign ===
Huddleston led in polling up until 2 months to election day against McConnell by as much as 40 points. McConnell attacked Huddleston for missed votes to make paid speeches in Congress, using television advertisements of bloodhounds trying to track down the Democratic Senator. Huddleston's 94% voting record was largely ignored. McConnell hired Roger Ailes for his campaign, a move he later called "one of the smartest moves I've ever made." Kentucky was a Democratic-leaning state up until McConnell's victory in 1984, though Ronald Reagan also carried the state. McConnell would serve with Democrat Wendell Ford until 1999, and served with Republicans thereafter. He later would become Senate Majority Leader.

=== Results ===
General election results
Party	Candidate	Votes	%	±%
Republican	Mitch McConnell	644,990	49.90%	+13.03%
Democratic	Walter Dee Huddleston (incumbent)	639,721	49.50%	−11.48%
Socialist Workers	Dave Welters	7,696	0.60%	+0.60%
Total votes		1,292,407	100.00%	N/A
Republican gain from Democratic				

== See also ==
- 1984 United States Senate elections
