= Mitch McConnell =

American politician and attorney (born 1942)

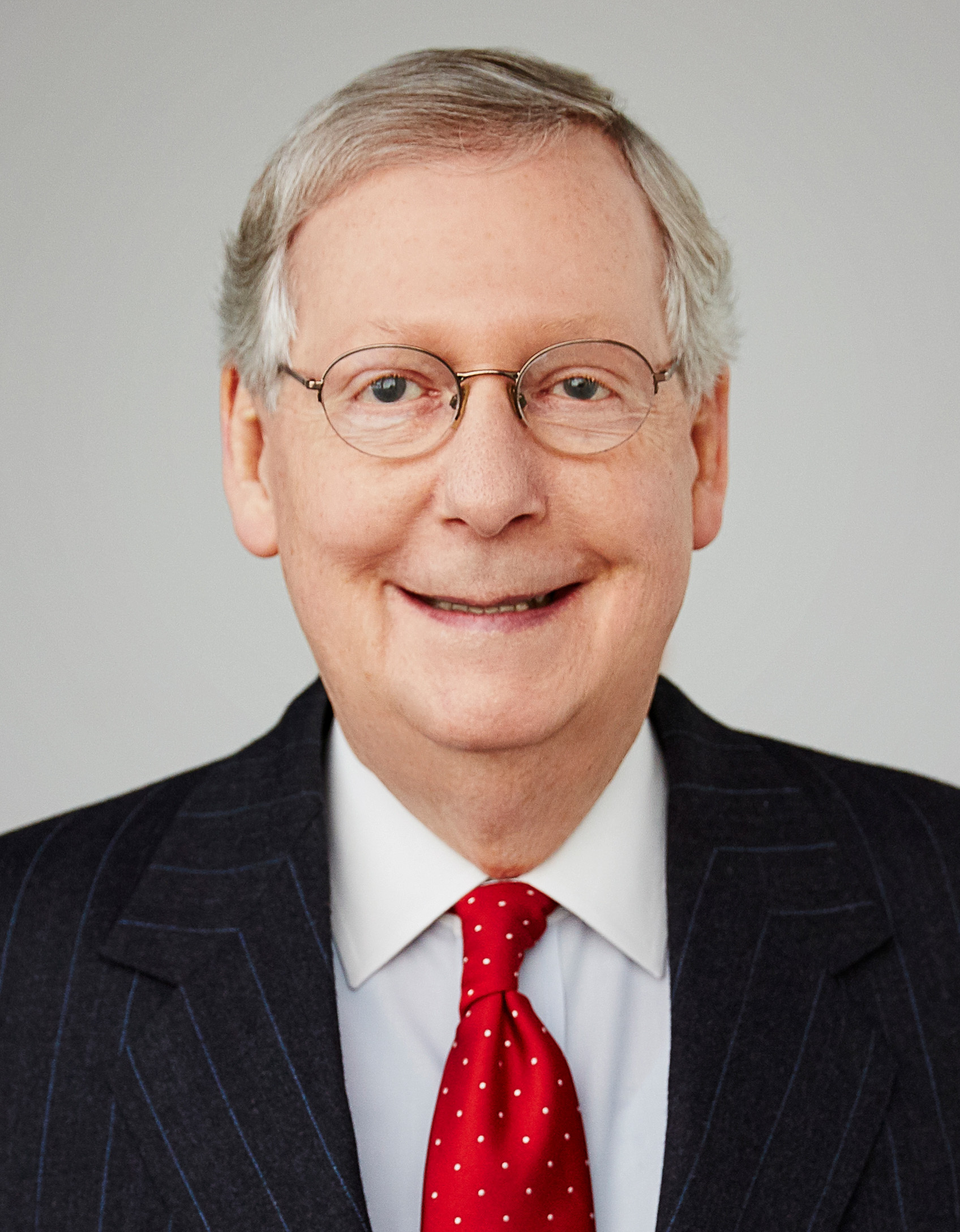
- Official portrait, 2016

United States Senator from Kentucky
- Incumbent
- Assumed office January 3, 1985 Serving with Rand Paul
- Preceded by: Walter Dee Huddleston
Senate positions
Chair of the Senate Rules Committee
Incumbent
Assumed office January 3, 2025
| Preceded by | Amy Klobuchar |
In office January 20, 2001 – June 6, 2001
| Preceded by | Chris Dodd |
| Succeeded by | Chris Dodd |
In office January 3, 1999 – January 3, 2001
| Preceded by | John Warner |
| Succeeded by | Chris Dodd |
Senate Majority Leader
In office January 3, 2015 – January 20, 2021
| Whip | John Cornyn; John Thune |
| Preceded by | Harry Reid |
| Succeeded by | Chuck Schumer |
Senate Minority Leader
In office January 20, 2021 – January 3, 2025
| Whip | John Thune |
| Preceded by | Chuck Schumer |
| Succeeded by | Chuck Schumer |
In office January 3, 2007 – January 3, 2015
| Whip | Trent Lott; Jon Kyl; John Cornyn |
| Preceded by | Harry Reid |
| Succeeded by | Harry Reid |
Leader of the Senate Republican Conference
In office January 3, 2007 – January 3, 2025
| Preceded by | Bill Frist |
| Succeeded by | John Thune |
Senate Majority Whip
In office January 3, 2003 – January 3, 2007
| Leader | Bill Frist |
| Preceded by | Harry Reid |
| Succeeded by | Dick Durbin |

Judge/Executive of Jefferson County
- In office January 2, 1978 – January 3, 1985
- Preceded by: Todd Hollenbach III (County Judge)
- Succeeded by: Bremer Ehrler

Acting United States Assistant Attorney General for the Office of Legislative Affairs
- In office February 1, 1975 – June 27, 1975
- President: Gerald Ford
- Preceded by: Vincent Rakestraw
- Succeeded by: Michael Uhlmann

Personal details
- Born: Addison Mitchell McConnell III; February 20, 1942 (age 84) Sheffield, Alabama, U.S.
- Party: Republican
- Spouses: Sherrill Redmon (m. 1968; div. 1980); Elaine Chao (m. 1993)
- Children: 3
- Education: University of Louisville (BA); University of Kentucky (JD)
- Website: Senate website Campaign website

Military service
- Branch: United States Army; Army Reserve
- Service: July 9, 1967 – August 15, 1967 (medical separation)
- Rank: Private
- McConnell's voice McConnell on Senate bipartisanship in his first speech as Majority Leader; Recorded January 7, 2015

Addison Mitchell McConnell III (born February 20, 1942) is an American politician and attorney who has been a United States senator from Kentucky since 1985 and has been Kentucky's senior U.S. senator since 1999. A member of the Republican Party, McConnell is in his seventh Senate term, making him the longest-serving senator in Kentucky history. He led the Senate Republican Conference from 2007 to 2025, serving once as majority leader (2015–2021) and twice as minority leader (2007–2015; 2021–2025), making him the longest-serving Senate party leader in U.S. history.

McConnell holds conservative political positions, although he was known as a pragmatist and a moderate Republican early in his political career. He led opposition to stricter campaign finance laws, culminating in the U.S. Supreme Court decision Citizens United v. FEC, which partially overturned the Bipartisan Campaign Reform Act (a.k.a. the McCain–Feingold Act) in 2010. McConnell worked to withhold Republican support for major presidential initiatives during the Obama administration, making frequent use of the filibuster, and blocked many of President Barack Obama's judicial nominees, including Supreme Court nominee Merrick Garland.

During the first Trump administration, the Senate Republican majority under McConnell's leadership passed the Tax Cuts and Jobs Act of 2017, the Economic Growth, Regulatory Relief and Consumer Protection Act in 2018, the First Step Act, and the Great American Outdoors Act, and confirmed a record number of federal appeals court judges during a president's first two years. McConnell invoked the nuclear option to eliminate the 60-vote requirement to end a filibuster for Supreme Court nominations, after his predecessor Harry Reid had eliminated the filibuster for all other presidential nominations; Trump subsequently won Supreme Court confirmation battles over Neil Gorsuch, Brett Kavanaugh and Amy Coney Barrett. While supportive of most of Trump's domestic and foreign policies, McConnell criticized Trump's attempts to overturn the 2020 presidential election, and despite voting to acquit in Trump's second impeachment trial for reasons related to the constitutionality of impeaching a former president, deemed him "practically and morally responsible" for the January 6 United States Capitol attack.

In 2015, 2019, and 2023, Time listed McConnell as one of the 100 most influential people in the world. On February 28, 2024, McConnell announced that he would step down as the Senate Republican Conference leader in January 2025, but would serve the remainder of his Senate term. An internal election to fill the post of Senate Republican Conference leader was held on November 13, in which South Dakota senator John Thune was selected.

On February 20, 2025, McConnell announced he would not run for an eighth Senate term in 2026 and would retire from politics. This came after increasing concerns about his health and ability to continue serving following multiple public episodes and health scares. A fall and subsequent hospitalization and rehabilitation prevented McConnell from voting in the Senate from mid-June through mid-September 2026. He returned to the Senate on September 14. He said he was continuing physical therapy and had not yet fully recovered.

== Early life and education ==
McConnell was born on February 20, 1942, to Julia Odene "Dean" (née Shockley) and Addison Mitchell "A.M." McConnell II at Colbert County Hospital (now Helen Keller Hospital) in Sheffield, Alabama, and grew up in Athens, Alabama, where his grandfather, Robert Hayes McConnell Sr., and his great-uncle, Addison Mitchell McConnell, owned McConnell Funeral Home. He is of Scots-Irish and English descent. His ancestor James McConnell fought on the American side in the American Revolutionary War.

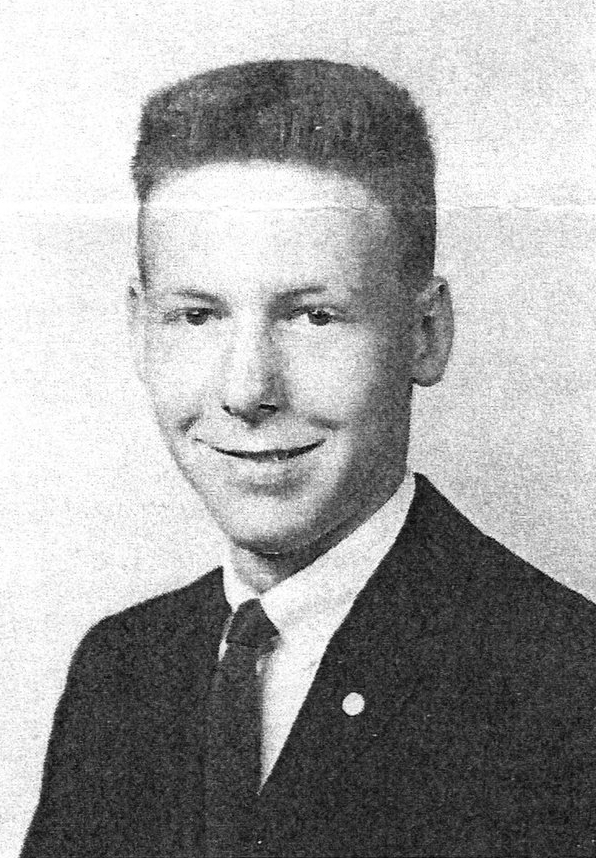
McConnell in duPont Manual High School's 1960 yearbook

In 1944, at the age of two, McConnell's upper left leg was paralyzed by a polio attack. He and his mother were living with an aunt in Five Points, Alabama, at the time, and he received treatment at the Roosevelt Warm Springs Institute for Rehabilitation. The treatment potentially saved him from being disabled for the rest of his life. McConnell said his family "almost went broke" because of costs related to his illness.

In 1950, when he was eight, McConnell moved with his family from Athens to Augusta, Georgia, where his father, who was in the Army, was stationed at Fort Gordon.

In 1956, McConnell's family moved to Louisville, Kentucky, where he attended duPont Manual High School. He was elected student council president at his high school during his junior year. He graduated Omicron Delta Kappa from the University of Louisville with a B.A. in political science in 1964 with honors. He was president of the Student Council of the College of Arts and Sciences and a member of the Phi Kappa Tau fraternity.

McConnell attended the 1963 March on Washington for Jobs and Freedom, where Martin Luther King Jr. gave the "I Have a Dream" speech. In 1964, at the age of 22, he attended civil rights rallies, and interned with Senator John Sherman Cooper. He has said his time with Cooper inspired him to run for the Senate later in life.

In 1967, McConnell graduated from the University of Kentucky College of Law, where he was president of the Student Bar Association.

== Early career (1967–1984) ==
In March 1967, shortly before the expiration of his educational draft deferment upon graduation from law school, McConnell enlisted in the U.S. Army Reserve as a private at Louisville. This was a coveted position because the Reserve units were mostly kept out of combat during the Vietnam War. His first day of training at Fort Knox, Kentucky, was July 9, 1967, two days after taking the bar exam, and his last day was August 15, 1967. Shortly after his arrival he was diagnosed with optic neuritis and deemed medically unfit for military service, and was honorably discharged. (Note: Although McConnell has allowed reporters to examine parts of his military record and take notes, he has refused to allow copies to be made or to disclose his entire record, despite calls by his opponents to do so. His time in service has also been the subject of criticism because his discharge was accelerated after his father placed a call to Senator John Sherman Cooper, who then sent a wire to the commanding general at Fort Knox advising that "Mitchell [is] anxious to clear post in order to enroll in New York University (NYU)". He was allowed to leave post just five days later, though McConnell maintains that no one helped him with his enlistment into or discharge from the reserves. According to McConnell, he struggled through the exercises at basic training and was sent to a doctor for a physical examination, which revealed McConnell's optic neuritis. McConnell did not attend NYU. Cheves, John (October 23, 2008). "McConnell opens military record". Lexington Herald-Leader. Archived from the original on January 5, 2019.) McConnell's political opponents have repeatedly made an issue of his brief time in service during his electoral campaigns.

From 1968 to 1970, McConnell worked as chief legislative assistant to Senator Marlow Cook in Washington, D.C., managing a legislative department consisting of five members as well as assisting with speechwriting and constituent services.

In 1971, McConnell returned to Louisville, where he worked on Tom Emberton's campaign for governor of Kentucky, which was unsuccessful. McConnell attempted to run for a seat in the Kentucky General Assembly but was disqualified because he did not meet the residency requirements for the office. He then worked for the Louisville law firm Segal, Isenberg, Sales and Stewart for a few years. During the same period, he taught a night class on political science at the University of Louisville.

In October 1974, McConnell returned to Washington to fill a position as Deputy Assistant Attorney General under President Ford, where he worked alongside Robert Bork, Laurence Silberman, and Antonin Scalia. He also served as acting United States Assistant Attorney General for the Office of Legislative Affairs under President Ford in 1975.

In 1977, McConnell was elected the Jefferson County judge/executive, the top political office in Jefferson County, Kentucky, at the time, defeating incumbent Democrat Todd Hollenbach III, 53% to 47%. He was reelected in 1981 against Jefferson County Commissioner Jim "Pop" Malone, 51% to 47%, outspending Malone 3–1, and occupied the office until his election to the U.S. Senate in 1984.

== U.S. Senate (1985–present) ==
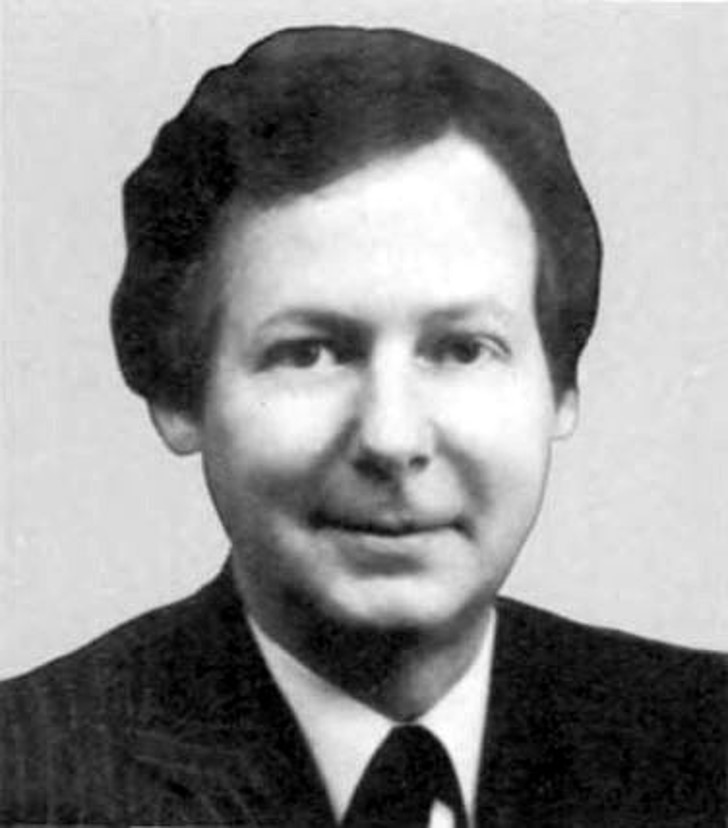
McConnell during the 99th United States Congress, 1985

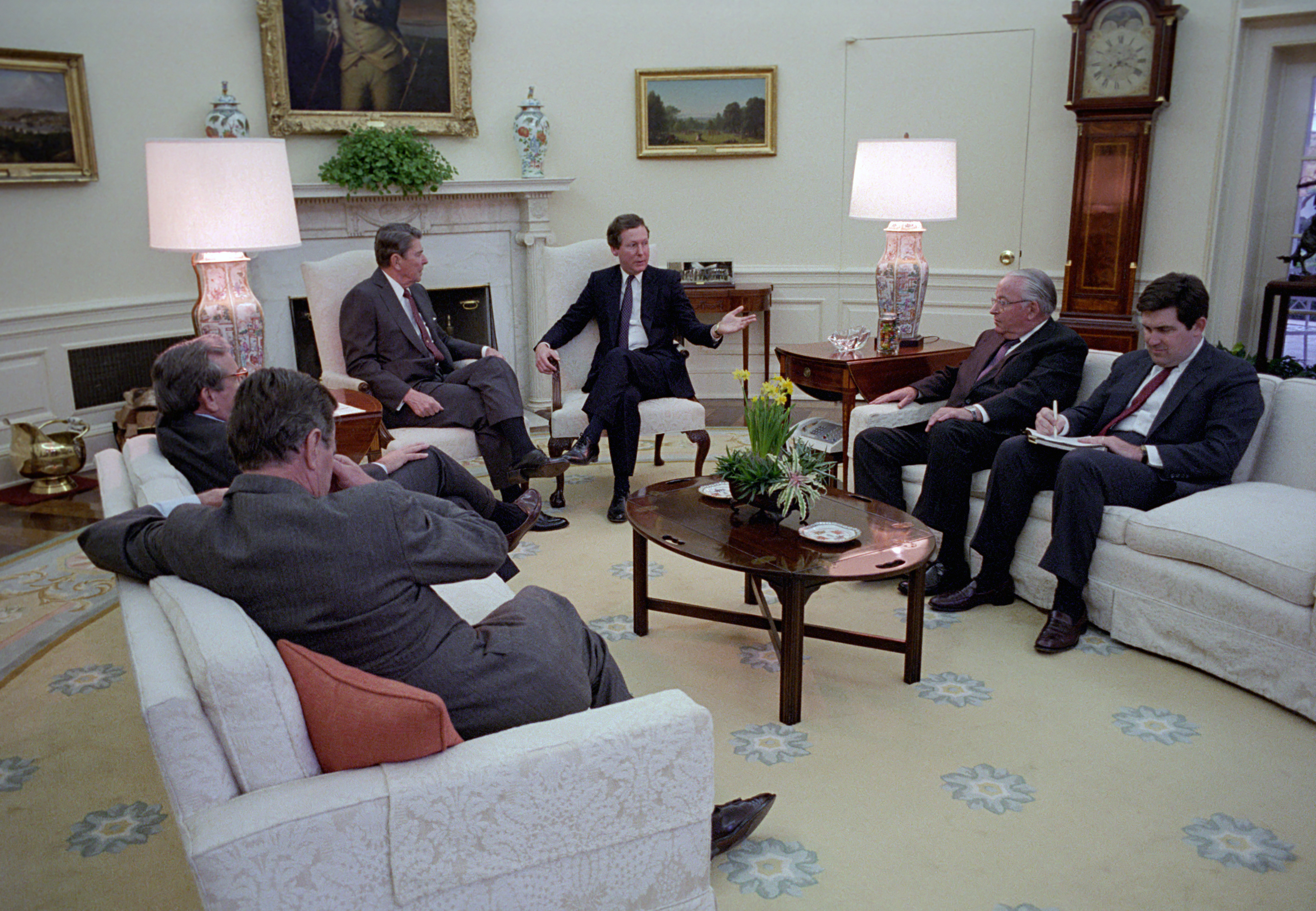
President Ronald Reagan in a meeting with McConnell in the Oval Office in March 1987

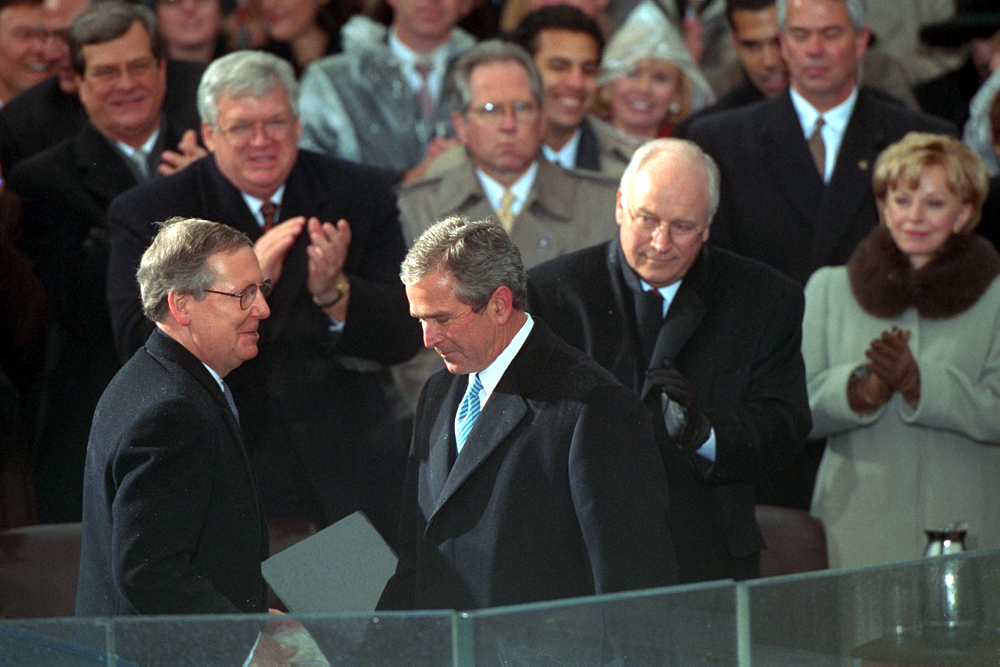
President George W. Bush shakes hands with McConnell at the former's first inauguration in January 2001.

In his early years as a politician in Kentucky, McConnell was known as a pragmatist and a moderate Republican. Over time he became more conservative. According to one of his biographers, McConnell transformed "from a moderate Republican who supported abortion rights and public employee unions to the embodiment of partisan obstructionism and conservative orthodoxy on Capitol Hill." McConnell has widely been described as an obstructionist.

From 1997 to 2001, McConnell chaired the National Republican Senatorial Committee, the body charged with securing electoral victories for Republicans. On February 12, 1999, he was one of 50 senators to vote to convict and remove Bill Clinton from office. He was first elected Majority Whip in the 108th Congress. Senate Majority Leader Bill Frist did not seek reelection in the 2006 elections. In November, after Republicans lost control of the Senate, they elected McConnell minority leader. After Republicans took control of the Senate following the 2014 Senate elections, McConnell became the Senate majority leader. In June 2018 he became the longest-serving Senate Republican leader in U.S. history. McConnell is the second Kentuckian to serve as a party leader in the Senate (after Alben W. Barkley led the Democrats from 1937 to 1949) and the longest-serving U.S. senator from Kentucky.

McConnell had a reputation as a skilled political strategist and tactician. This reputation dimmed after Republicans failed to repeal the Affordable Care Act (Obamacare) in 2017 during consolidated Republican control of government.

McConnell regularly obtained earmarks for businesses and institutions in Kentucky until Congress banned the practice in 2010. He has been criticized for funding "temporary patches" to Kentucky's long-term healthcare problems while simultaneously opposing and obstructing national programs that seek to improve healthcare more systematically, such as Obamacare and Medicaid expansion.

=== Actions under presidential administrations since 2009 ===
==== Obama administration ====
As the leading Republican senator, McConnell confronted and pressured other Republican senators who were willing to negotiate with Democrats and the Obama administration. According to Purdue University political scientist Bert A. Rockman, "pure party line voting has been evident now for some time ... but rarely has the tactic of 'oppositionism' been so boldly stated as McConnell did." According to University of Texas legal scholar Sanford Levinson, McConnell learned that obstruction and Republican unity were the optimal ways to ensure Republican gains in upcoming elections after he observed how Democratic cooperation with the Bush administration on No Child Left Behind and Medicare Part D helped Bush's 2004 reelection. Levinson noted, "McConnell altogether rationally ... concluded that Republicans have nothing to gain, as a political party, from collaborating in anything that the president could then claim as an achievement." A number of political scientists, historians, and legal scholars have characterized McConnell's obstructionism and constitutional hardball as contributors to democratic erosion in the United States.

In October 2010, McConnell said, "the single most important thing we want to achieve is for President Obama to be a one-term president." Asked whether this meant "endless, or at least frequent, confrontation with the president", McConnell said, "if [Obama is] willing to meet us halfway on some of the biggest issues, it's not inappropriate for us to do business with him." According to political scientists Jacob Hacker and Paul Pierson, "Facing off against Obama, [McConnell] worked to deny even minimal Republican support for major presidential initiatives—initiatives that were, as a rule, in keeping with the moderate model of decades past, and often with moderate Republican stances of a few years past." The New York Times wrote early in Obama's administration that "on the major issues—not just health care, but financial regulation and the economic stimulus package, among others—Mr. McConnell has held Republican defections to somewhere between minimal and nonexistent, allowing him to slow the Democratic agenda if not defeat aspects of it." The Republican caucus threatened repeatedly to force the United States to default on its debt, McConnell saying he had learned from the 2011 debt-ceiling crisis that "it's a hostage that's worth ransoming".

McConnell worked to delay and obstruct health care reform and banking reform, two of the most notable pieces of legislation that Democrats navigated through Congress early in Obama's tenure. Political scientists noted that "by slowing action even on measures supported by many Republicans, McConnell capitalized on the scarcity of floor time, forcing Democratic leaders into difficult trade-offs concerning which measures were worth pursuing. ... Slowing the Senate's ability to process even routine measures limited the sheer volume of liberal bills that could be adopted."

==== First Trump administration ====
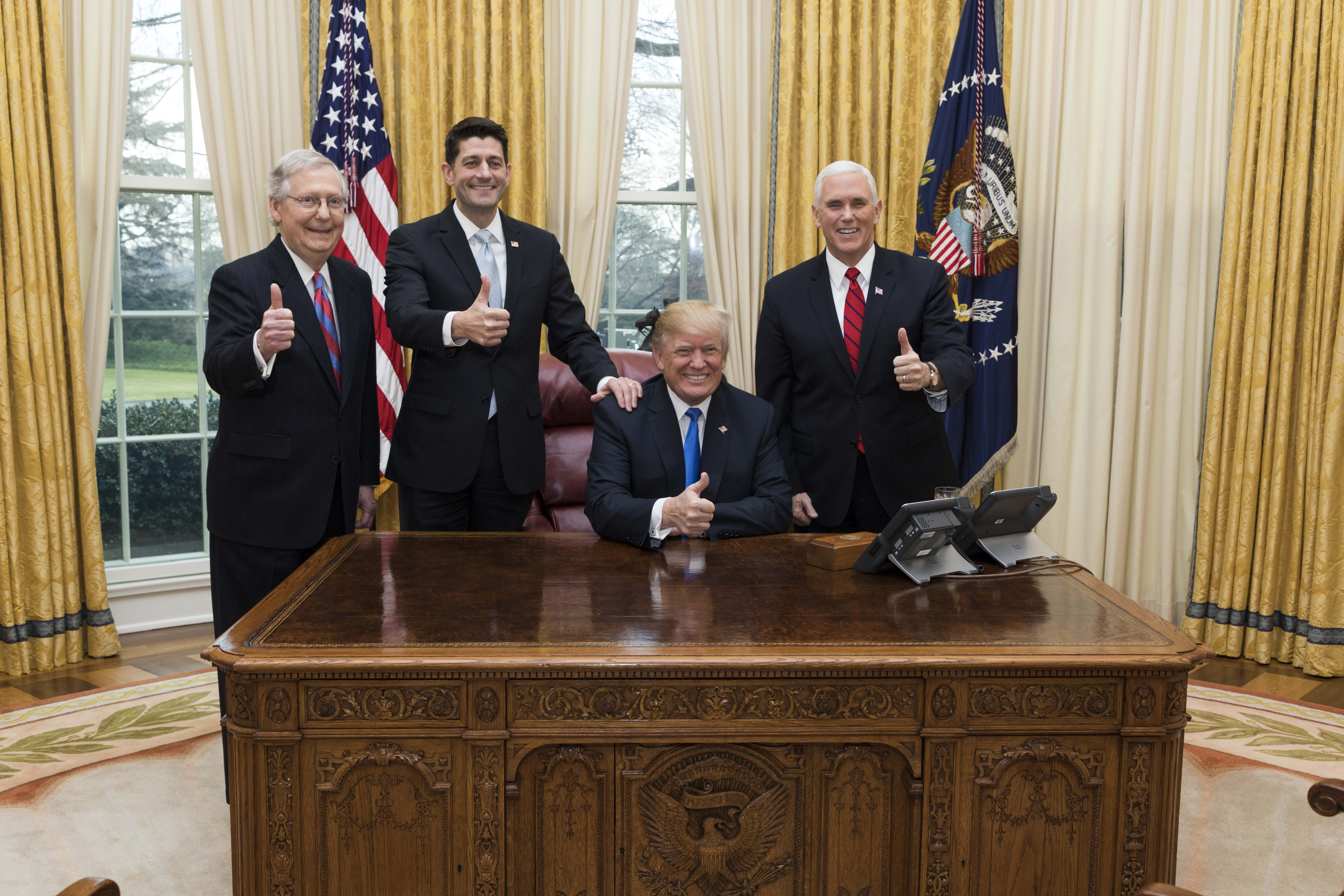
Donald Trump, Mike Pence, Paul Ryan, and McConnell celebrate the passage of the Tax Cuts and Jobs Act of 2017, December 2017

McConnell initially endorsed fellow Kentucky senator Rand Paul for president in 2016. Paul withdrew from the race after the Iowa caucuses, and McConnell endorsed presumptive nominee Donald Trump on May 4, 2016. But McConnell disagreed with Trump on many occasions. In May 2016, after Trump suggested that federal judge Gonzalo P. Curiel was biased against Trump because of his Mexican heritage, McConnell said: "I don't agree with what [Trump] had to say. This is a man who was born in Indiana. All of us came here from somewhere else." In July 2016, after Trump criticized the parents of Humayun Khan, a Muslim-American soldier who was killed in Iraq, McConnell said, "All Americans should value the patriotic service of the patriots who volunteer to selflessly defend us in the armed services." On October 7, 2016, following the Donald Trump Access Hollywood controversy, McConnell said, "As the father of three daughters, I strongly believe that Trump needs to apologize directly to women and girls everywhere, and take full responsibility for the utter lack of respect for women shown in his comments on that tape." In private, McConnell reportedly expresses disdain for Trump and "abhors" his behavior.

In October 2017, White House chief strategist Steve Bannon and other Trump allies blamed McConnell for stalling the Trump administration's legislation. In response, McConnell cited Neil Gorsuch's confirmation to the Supreme Court to show that the Senate supported Trump's agenda.

After Joe Biden defeated Trump in the 2020 election, McConnell at first refused to recognize Biden as the winner. In his public statements, McConnell did not repeat any of Trump's false claims of voter fraud, but did not contradict them, ignoring questions about evidence and instead arguing that Trump had the right to challenge the results. At the same time that McConnell refused to recognize Biden, he celebrated Republicans who won their Senate and House races in the same elections.

On December 15, the day after the electoral college vote, McConnell reversed his stance and publicly acknowledged Biden's win, saying, "Today, I want to congratulate President-elect Joe Biden." On January 6, during the Electoral College vote count, McConnell spoke out against the efforts of Trump and his allies to overturn the election:

Trump claims the election was stolen. The assertions range from specific local allegations to constitutional arguments to sweeping conspiracy theories ... nothing before us proves illegality anywhere near the massive scale—the massive scale—that would have tipped the entire election. ... If this election were overturned by mere allegations from the losing side, our democracy would enter a death spiral. We'd never see the whole nation accept an election again. Every four years would be a scramble for power at any cost.

Later that day, he described the storming of the Capitol building (which occurred while the Electoral College votes were being counted) as a "failed insurrection" that "tried to disrupt our democracy".

On April 10, 2021, Trump called McConnell a "dumb son of a bitch". Trump added: "I hired his wife. Did he ever say thank you?" Trump has continued to attack McConnell in personal terms since then, but McConnell has not responded publicly.

===== Trump's first impeachment =====
On November 5, 2019, as the House of Representatives began public hearings on the impeachment of President Trump, McConnell said, "I'm pretty sure how [an impeachment trial is] likely to end. ... If it were today, I don't think there's any question. It would not lead to a removal."

On December 14, 2019, McConnell met with White House counsel Pat Cipollone and White House legislative affairs director Eric Ueland. Later that day, he said that for Trump's impeachment trial, he would be in "total coordination with the White House counsel's office" and Trump's representatives. He also said there was "no chance" the Senate would convict Trump and remove him from office.

On December 17, 2019, McConnell rejected a request to call four witnesses for Trump's impeachment trial because, according to McConnell, the Senate's role was to "act as judge and jury", not to investigate. Later that day, McConnell told the media: "I'm not an impartial juror [in this impeachment trial]. This is a political process. There's not anything judicial about it."

After Trump's acquittal, McConnell was noted for his ability to block witnesses, to secure Trump's acquittal, and to maintain party unity during the impeachment process. Commentators noted that he had kept Republican senators "marching in lockstep" throughout the process.

===== Trump's second impeachment =====
On January 12, 2021, it was reported that McConnell supported impeaching Trump for his role in inciting the 2021 storming of the United States Capitol, believing it would make it easier for Republicans to purge the party of Trump and rebuild the party. On January 13, despite having the authority to call for an emergency meeting of the Senate to hold the Senate trial, McConnell did not do so, claiming unanimous consent was required. He called for delaying the Senate trial until after Biden's inauguration. In the Senate trial, McConnell voted to acquit Trump on February 13, 2021, saying it was unconstitutional to convict a president who was no longer in office.

The vote to convict was a bipartisan majority (57–43) but not enough to pass the two-thirds threshold. After the vote, McConnell lambasted and condemned Trump in a 20-minute speech on the Senate floor, saying he believed Trump was guilty of everything the House managers alleged. He said:

Former President Trump's actions preceding the riot were a disgraceful dereliction of duty ... There is no question that President Trump is practically and morally responsible for provoking the events of that day ... If President Trump were still in office, I would have carefully considered whether the House managers proved their specific charge.

He explained why he nonetheless voted to acquit: "Article II, Section 4 must have force. It tells us the President, Vice President, and civil officers may be impeached and convicted. Donald Trump is no longer the president. Clearly that mandatory sentence cannot be applied to somebody who has left office. The entire process revolves around removal. If removal becomes impossible, conviction becomes insensible." Yet he said that Trump "didn't get away with anything yet" since Trump would remain subject to the country's criminal and civil laws.

When there was a proposal for an independent commission to investigate the January 6 United States Capitol attack, McConnell sought to organize Republican senators to filibuster it, and on May 28, 2021, he voted against its creation.

==== Biden administration ====
McConnell's relationship with the Biden administration has been portrayed in media as one of comity. Biden has described McConnell as "a friend, colleague and 'man of his word.'" McConnell has praised bipartisan legislation they worked on together, and was the only Republican to attend the 2015 funeral of Biden's son Beau Biden.

In October 2021, McConnell helped pass a bill that extended the debt ceiling. He convinced 11 Republicans to vote with the Democrats for it, without which the United States would have defaulted on its debts.

==== Second Trump administration ====
McConnell stepped down as Senate Republican leader in 2024, months before the 2024 United States elections. John Thune was elected to succeed him after Republicans regained the majority in the 2024 U.S. Senate elections.

In late 2024, McConnell published an opinion article on American power and what he sees as the foreign-policy mistakes of former presidents.

McConnell has been described as largely irrelevant in Trump's second term. He has voted against three of Trump's cabinet nominees: Pete Hegseth for Secretary of Defense, Tulsi Gabbard for the Director of National Intelligence, and Robert F. Kennedy Jr. for Secretary of Health and Human Services.

In February 2025, McConnell announced he would not seek reelection in 2026 and planned to retire at the end of his term in 2027.

=== Tactics and actions on particular topics ===
==== Use of the filibuster ====
As minority leader, McConnell frequently used the filibuster to delay or obstruct legislation and judicial appointments. A filibuster is an attempt to "talk a bill to death", forcing Senate leadership to abandon a proposed measure instead of waiting out the filibuster―or at least to delay the measure's passage. In the Senate, any senator may speak for unlimited time unless a 60-person majority votes to invoke cloture, or end debate, and proceed to a final vote. Political scientists have called McConnell's use of the filibuster "constitutional hardball", referring to the misuse of procedural tools in a way that undermines democracy.

Political scientists Hacker and Pierson wrote: "Filibusters left no fingerprints. When voters heard that legislation had been 'defeated', journalists rarely highlighted that this defeat meant a minority had blocked a majority. Not only did this strategy produce an atmosphere of gridlock and dysfunction; it also chewed up the Senate calendar, restricting the range of issues on which Democrats could progress."

In 2013, Senate Majority Leader Harry Reid eliminated the filibuster for all presidential nominations except the Supreme Court. By that time, nearly half of all votes to invoke cloture in the history of the Senate had occurred during Obama's presidency. In April 2017, Senate Republicans, led by McConnell, eliminated the filibuster for Supreme Court nominations to end debate on Neil Gorsuch's nomination. In August 2019, McConnell wrote an editorial for The New York Times strongly opposing the elimination of the filibuster on legislation.

==== Judicial nominees in the Obama administration ====
Throughout Obama's tenure, McConnell led Senate Republicans in what has been called "a disciplined, sustained, at times underhanded campaign to deny the Democratic president the opportunity to appoint federal judges". In June 2009, after Obama nominated Sonia Sotomayor as associate justice, McConnell and Jeff Sessions opined that Sotomayor's 17 years as a federal judge and over 3,600 judicial opinions would require lengthy review and advocated against Democrats hastening the confirmation process. On July 17, McConnell announced that he would vote against Sotomayor's confirmation. In August, McConnell called Sotomayor "a fine person with an impressive story and a distinguished background" but said he did not believe she would withhold her personal or political views while serving as a justice. Sotomayor was confirmed days later.

In May 2010, after President Obama nominated Elena Kagan to succeed the retiring John Paul Stevens, McConnell said in a Senate speech that Americans wanted to make sure Kagan would be independent of influence from White House as an associate justice and noted that Obama called Kagan a friend of his in announcing her nomination. McConnell announced his opposition to Kagan's confirmation, saying she was not forthcoming enough about her "views on basic principles of American constitutional law". Kagan was confirmed the next month.

In 2014, Republicans gained control of the Senate, and McConnell became majority leader; he used his new power to start what was considered "a near blockade" of Obama's judicial appointments. According to The New York Times, Obama's final two years as president saw 18 district court judges and one appeals court judge confirmed, the fewest since President Harry S. Truman. In comparison, the final two years of the presidencies of George W. Bush, Bill Clinton, and Ronald Reagan had between 55 and 70 district court judges each confirmed and between 10 and 15 appeals court judges confirmed. The Los Angeles Times wrote that McConnell had brought about an "extraordinary two-year slowdown in judicial confirmations", detailing 22 confirmations of Obama's judicial nominees, the lowest since Truman in 1951–1952. The number of federal judicial vacancies at the end of Obama's term was more than twice the number at the end of George W. Bush's term. (Note: According to the Congressional Research Service, on the first day of 2015, Obama had 3.9% of circuit court seats vacant, and 4.9% of district court seats vacant. By the first day of 2017, the figures had risen to 9.5% and 12.8% respectively. The 114th Congress confirmed 28.6% of Obama's circuit and district judge nominees; every other Congress in that research time frame (1977–2018, 95th to 115th Congress) had a confirmation rate of between 53% and 98%."Judicial Nomination Statistics and Analysis: U.S. District and Circuit Courts, 1977–2018" (PDF). Congressional Research Service. Archived (PDF) from the original on July 16, 2019.) In a 2019 interview, McConnell credited himself for the large number of judicial vacancies created in the last two years of Obama's presidency.

On February 13, 2016, Supreme Court justice Antonin Scalia died. Shortly thereafter, McConnell issued a statement indicating that the Senate would not consider any Supreme Court nominee Obama put forth. "The American people should have a voice in the selection of their next Supreme Court justice. Therefore, this vacancy should not be filled until we have a new president", McConnell said. On March 16, 2016, Obama nominated Merrick Garland, a Judge of the D.C. Circuit Court of Appeals, to the Supreme Court. Under McConnell's direction, Senate Republicans refused to take any action on the nomination. Garland's nomination expired on January 3, 2017, with the end of the 114th Congress.

In an August 2016 speech in Kentucky, McConnell said, "one of my proudest moments was when I looked Barack Obama in the eye and I said, 'Mr. President, you will not fill the Supreme Court vacancy.'" In April 2018, McConnell said the decision not to act on Garland's nomination was "the most consequential decision I've made in my entire public career". Political scientists and legal scholars called McConnell's refusal to hold Senate hearings on Garland "unprecedented", a "culmination of [his] confrontational style", a "blatant abuse of constitutional norms", and a "classic example of constitutional hardball".

==== Judicial nominees in the first Trump administration ====
In January 2017, President Trump nominated Neil Gorsuch to fill the Supreme Court vacancy left after Scalia's death. Gorsuch's nomination was confirmed on April 7, 2017, after McConnell eliminated the filibuster on Supreme Court nominees.

On July 18, 2018, with Andy Oldham's Senate confirmation, Senate Republicans broke a record for largest number of appeals court judiciary confirmations during a president's first two years; Oldham became the 23rd appeals court judge confirmed in Trump's term. McConnell said he considers the judiciary to be the item of Trump's first two years with the longest-lasting impact on the country. The record for the number of circuit court judges confirmed during a president's first year was broken in 2017. The previous two-year record of 22 confirmations took place under President George H. W. Bush. By March 2020, McConnell had contacted an unknown number of judges, encouraging them to retire before the 2020 election. He confirmed 260 federal judges during Trump's four-year term, shifting the federal judiciary to the right.

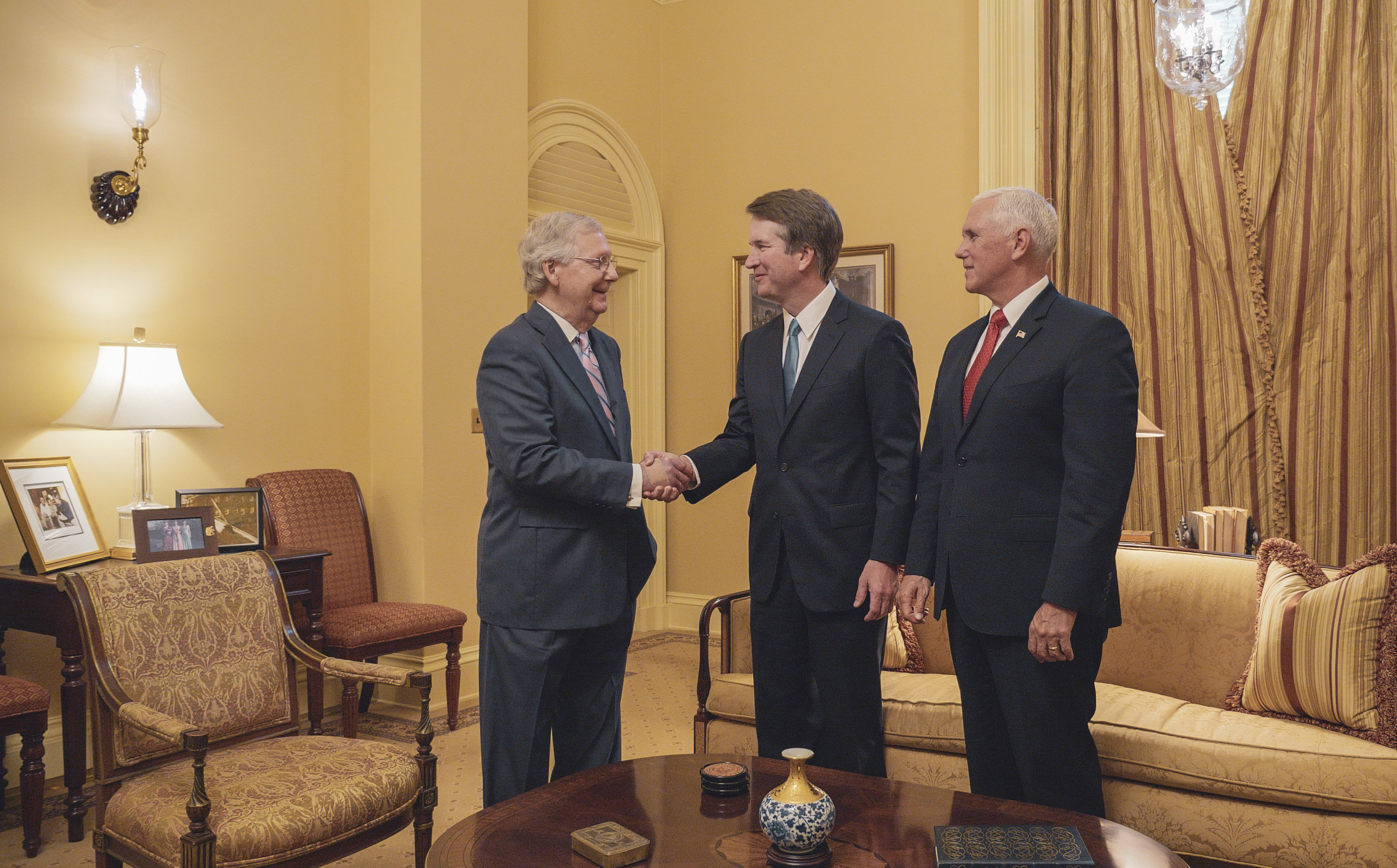
McConnell (left) with then-Judge Brett Kavanaugh (middle), the nominee to replace retiring Justice Anthony Kennedy, and Vice President Mike Pence, 2018

In July 2018, Trump nominated Brett Kavanaugh to replace the retiring Anthony Kennedy as an associate justice of the Supreme Court. McConnell accused Democrats of creating an "extreme" distortion of Kavanaugh's record during his hearings. In September 2018, Christine Blasey Ford publicly alleged that Kavanaugh had sexually assaulted her in 1982. After it was reported that Democrats were investigating a second allegation against Kavanaugh, McConnell said, "I want to make it perfectly clear. ... Judge Kavanaugh will be voted on here on the Senate floor." Kavanaugh was confirmed on October 6. McConnell said the confirmation process was a low point for the Senate, but also downplayed reports of dysfunction in the Senate; he said claims that the Senate was "somehow broken over this [were] simply inaccurate".

In October 2018, McConnell said if a Supreme Court vacancy were to occur in 2020, he would not repeat his 2016 decision to let the winner of the upcoming presidential election nominate a justice. He argued that because in 2016 the Senate was controlled by a party other than the president's, the 2016 precedent was not applicable in 2020, when Republicans controlled both the presidency and Senate. In September 2020, after Ruth Bader Ginsburg died, he announced the Senate would vote on Trump's nominated replacement. On October 23, McConnell set in place the Senate debate on the confirmation of Amy Coney Barrett to fill Ginsburg's seat. Barrett was confirmed on October 26.

==== Government shutdowns ====
===== Shutdown of October 2013 =====
The federal government was shut down from October 1 to 17, 2013, after Congress failed to enact legislation to fund it. McConnell later vowed Republicans would not force the U.S. to default on its debt or shut down the government in 2014, when stopgap funding measures were set to expire. He also said he would not allow other Republicans to obstruct the budget-making process.

===== Threatened shutdown in mid-2018 =====
In July 2018, McConnell said funding for the Mexico–United States border wall would likely have to wait until the midterms had concluded. Trump tweeted two days later that he was willing to allow a government shutdown to get funding. Several spending bills were approved that August; the approvals were seen as a victory for McConnell in his attempts to prevent another government shutdown.

===== Shutdown of 2018–2019 =====
From December 22, 2018, until January 25, 2019, the federal government shut down when Congress refused to give in to Trump's demand for $5.7 billion in federal funds for a U.S.–Mexico border wall. In December 2018, the Republican-controlled Senate unanimously passed an appropriations bill without wall funding, and the Republican-controlled House of Representatives and Trump appeared likely to approve the bill. After Trump faced heavy criticism from some right-wing media outlets and pundits for appearing to back down on his campaign promise to "build the wall", he said he would not sign any appropriations bill that did not fund the wall.

During this shutdown, McConnell blocked the Senate from voting on appropriations legislation and said it was not his place to mediate between the Senate and Trump. Privately, McConnell had advised Trump against initiating the shutdown. Democrats criticized McConnell for not putting appropriations legislation up for a vote, noting that the Republican-controlled Senate had unanimously passed an appropriations bill without wall funding and that the Senate could override Trump's veto.

By January 23, McConnell had blocked four Senate bills to reopen the government and a bill funding the Homeland Security Department through February 8. He called for Democrats to support a Trump administration-backed measure that included $5.7 billion in wall funding, together with a temporary extension of protections for DACA recipients, a Democratic priority. Privately, other Republican senators pressured McConnell to stop blocking appropriations legislation.

The shutdown ended on January 25, when Trump signed a three-week funding measure reopening the government until February 15 without funds for a border wall. This was the longest government shutdown in U.S. history.

==== COVID-19 response ====
In response to the COVID-19 pandemic in the United States, McConnell initially opposed the Families First Coronavirus Response Act, calling it a Democratic "ideological wish list". He reversed his position when Trump endorsed the proposed package. The bill passed in the Senate by a vote of 90–8.

McConnell also directed Senate Republicans in negotiations for two other COVID-19 response packages: the Coronavirus Preparedness and Response Supplemental Appropriations Act, 2020 and the CARES Act. The CARES Act was the largest economic stimulus package in U.S. history, amounting to 10% of total U.S. gross domestic product. It passed both houses of Congress with bipartisan support.

Speaking on the Hugh Hewitt radio show on April 22, 2020, McConnell suggested that states should be able to declare bankruptcy instead of receiving additional COVID-19 aid funds—funds he implied would be used to save insolvent state pension funds instead of for COVID-19 relief. His comments were sharply criticized by various state and local officials. States cannot declare bankruptcy.

After the CARES Act passed, McConnell waited several months before advancing any additional COVID-19 relief measures in the Senate, saying in May, "I don't think we have yet felt the urgency of acting immediately" and that Congress should "[hit] pause" to evaluate how the allocated funds were working before approving more. He was absent from negotiations between congressional Democrats and White House officials for an additional aid package.

On September 10, 2020, a pared-down COVID-19 relief bill crafted by McConnell failed to pass the Senate because of a Democratic filibuster. Democrats called the bill "completely inadequate" given the scope of the COVID-19 crisis and a partisan maneuver to help Republican senators up for reelection. McConnell called the bill a choice between "do[ing] something" and "do[ing] nothing", and said he was holding the procedural vote to get lawmakers on the record about their willingness to compromise on COVID-19 legislation.

=== Approval ratings ===
As the leader of the Senate Republicans, McConnell has received much of the criticism and disapproval that Republicans receive from Democratic voters, receiving near uniform disapproval from left-of-center voters. Furthermore, as a result of his unpopularity with Trump and the more populist base, McConnell has had historically low approval for a senator by the electorate as a whole: a 2012 poll and a 2016 poll each found that McConnell had the lowest home-state approval rating of any sitting senator. With a 49% disapproval rate in 2017, McConnell had the highest disapproval rating of any senator.

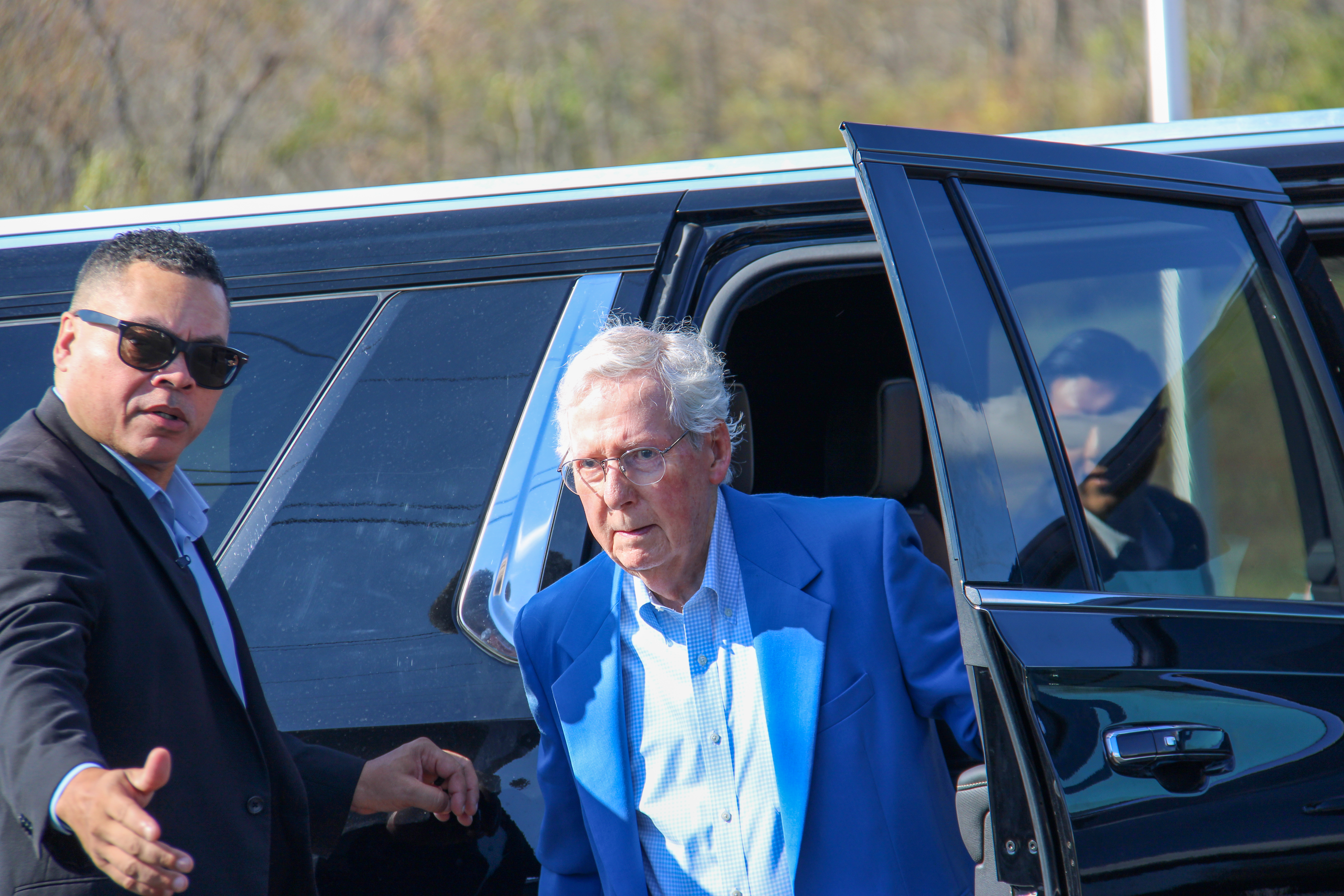
Senator Mitch McConnell in Kentucky on October 30, 2024

In September 2019, Morning Consult reported that McConnell's approval rating had been underwater since the first quarter of 2017, when it was 44% positive and 47% negative. The worst rating since that time was in the fourth quarter of 2018, when he had a 38% positive rating and a 47% negative rating among Kentuckians. At that time he was briefly not the least popular senator, surpassed by Claire McCaskill and Jeff Flake. But as of the second quarter of 2019, McConnell's ratings were 36% positive and 50% negative. He netted −56 among Democrats, +29 among Republicans, and −24 among Independents. An average of polls by The Economist/YouGov, Politico/Morning Consult, and Harvard-Harris from the end of July through August 2019 (7/31–8/27), was 23% favorable and 48% unfavorable (−25.0 spread).

In 2020, according to Morning Consult, Susan Collins edged out McConnell as the least popular senator with a 52% unfavorable rating from Maine voters compared to 50% for McConnell.

=== Committee assignments ===
McConnell's committee assignments for the 118th Congress are as follows:

- Committee on Agriculture, Nutrition, and Forestry
  - Subcommittee on Commodities, Risk Management, and Trade
  - Subcommittee on Conservation, Climate, Forestry, and Natural Resources
  - Subcommittee on Food and Nutrition, Specialty Crops, Organics, and Research
- Committee on Appropriations
  - Subcommittee on Agriculture, Rural Development, Food and Drug Administration, and Related Agencies
  - Subcommittee on Defense
  - Subcommittee on Energy and Water Development
  - Subcommittee on Interior, Environment, and Related Agencies
  - Subcommittee on Military Construction and Veterans' Affairs, and Related Agencies
  - Subcommittee on State, Foreign Operations, and Related Programs
- Committee on Rules and Administration (Chair)

== Political views ==
McConnell has taken conservative positions for the past several decades. During his Senate tenure, he led opposition to stricter campaign finance laws, culminating in the Supreme Court ruling that partially overturned the Bipartisan Campaign Reform Act (a.k.a. the McCain–Feingold Act) in 2010. He led opposition to Obamacare, first through efforts to delay or prevent the law's passage, and later to repeal or replace it, including via the American Healthcare Reform Act. McConnell has opposed stronger regulations, gun control measures, and efforts to mitigate climate change. He has criticized proposed legislation by House Democrats such as the Green New Deal and Medicare for All, and was criticized by Nancy Pelosi for withholding votes on measures passed by the Democratic-controlled House during his time as Senate majority leader, including the For the People Act of 2019, the Equality Act, and the Paycheck Fairness Act. McConnell has supported stronger border security, free trade agreements, and reductions in taxes. As Senate majority leader, he led the passing of the Tax Cuts and Jobs Act of 2017 and the Economic Growth, Regulatory Relief and Consumer Protection Act in 2018.

His foreign policy views have included support of sanctions on Cuba, Iran, and Russia, support of Ukraine during its invasion by Russia, opposition to the Iran nuclear deal, and support of Israel in its Gaza war. He voted for the Iraq Resolution, which authorized military action against Iraq, and publicly supported the Iraq War troop surge of 2007. In June 2025, he supported Israel in the Twelve-Day War and called for military intervention by the United States against Iran.

Earlier in his political career, during the 1960s and 1970s, McConnell held moderate stances, including support of abortions, support of unions, and support of the civil rights movement. Following the Supreme Court's ruling in Obergefell v. Hodges, McConnell expressed his opposition to same-sex marriage stating "I've always felt that marriage is between one man and one woman and the Supreme Court has held otherwise. That's the law of the land."

== Electoral history ==
| Year | Office | Type | Party | Main opponent | Party | Votes for McConnell | | | | Result | Swing |
| Year | Office | Type | Party | Main opponent | Party | Total | % | P. | ±% | Result | Swing |
|---|---|---|---|---|---|---|---|---|---|---|---|
| 1984 | Senator | Primary | Republican | C. Roger Harker | Republican | 39,465 | 79.22% | 1st | N/A | Won | N/A |
| 1984 | Senator | General | Republican | Walter Dee Huddleston (I) | Democratic | 644,990 | 49.90% | 1st | +13.03% | Won | Gain |
| 1990 | Senator | Primary | Republican | Tommy Klein | Republican | 64,063 | 88.52% | 1st | +9.30% | Won | N/A |
| 1990 | Senator | General | Republican | Harvey I. Sloane | Democratic | 478,034 | 52.19% | 1st | +2.28% | Won | Hold |
| 1996 | Senator | Primary | Republican | Tommy Klein | Republican | 88,620 | 88.59% | 1st | +0.07% | Won | N/A |
| 1996 | Senator | General | Republican | Steve Beshear | Democratic | 724,794 | 55.45% | 1st | +3.27% | Won | Hold |
| 2002 | Senator | General | Republican | Lois Combs Weinberg | Democratic | 731,679 | 64.68% | 1st | +9.22% | Won | Hold |
| 2008 | Senator | Primary | Republican | Daniel Essek | Republican | 168,127 | 86.09% | 1st | −2.50% | Won | N/A |
| 2008 | Senator | General | Republican | Bruce Lunsford | Democratic | 953,816 | 52.97% | 1st | −11.7% | Won | Hold |
| 2014 | Senator | Primary | Republican | Matt Bevin | Republican | 213,753 | 60.19% | 1st | −25.9% | Won | N/A |
| 2014 | Senator | General | Republican | Alison Lundergan Grimes | Democratic | 806,787 | 56.19% | 1st | +3.22% | Won | Hold |
| 2020 | Senator | Primary | Republican | C. Wesley Morgan | Republican | 342,660 | 82.80% | 1st | +22.61 | Won | N/A |
| 2020 | Senator | General | Republican | Amy McGrath | Democratic | 1,233,315 | 57.76% | 1st | +1.57% | Won | Hold |

=== 1984 ===
In 1984, McConnell ran for the U.S. Senate against two-term Democratic incumbent Walter Dee Huddleston. The election race was not decided until the last returns came in, when McConnell won by 3,437 votes out of more than 1.2 million votes cast, just over 0.4%. McConnell was the only Republican Senate challenger to win that year, despite Ronald Reagan's landslide victory in the presidential election.

McConnell was the first Republican to win a statewide election in Kentucky since 1968, and benefited from the popularity of President Ronald Reagan, who was running for reelection in 1984 and was supported by 60% of Kentucky voters.

=== 1990 ===
In 1990, McConnell faced former Louisville Mayor Harvey I. Sloane, winning by 4.4%.

=== 1996 ===
In 1996, he defeated Steve Beshear by 12.6%, even as Bill Clinton narrowly carried the state. McConnell's campaign ran television ads warning voters to not "Get BeSheared" and included images of sheep being sheared.

=== 2002 ===
In 2002, he was unopposed in the Republican primary. He then defeated Lois Combs Weinberg by 29.4%.

=== 2008 ===
In 2008, McConnell faced his closest contest since 1990. He defeated Bruce Lunsford by 6%.

=== 2014 ===
In 2014, McConnell faced Louisville businessman Matt Bevin in the Republican primary. The 60.2% won by McConnell was the lowest voter support for a Kentucky U.S. senator in a primary since 1938. He faced Democratic Secretary of State Alison Lundergan Grimes in the general election, and defeated Grimes, 56.2–40.7%.

=== 2020 ===
In the November 2020 general election, McConnell faced Democratic nominee Amy McGrath, a former Marine fighter pilot; and Libertarian nominee Brad Barron, a businessman and farmer. During the campaign, McConnell and McGrath agreed to one hour-long, socially distanced debate on October 12. McConnell was elected to his seventh term on November 3, defeating McGrath by nearly 20 percentage points.

== Personal life ==
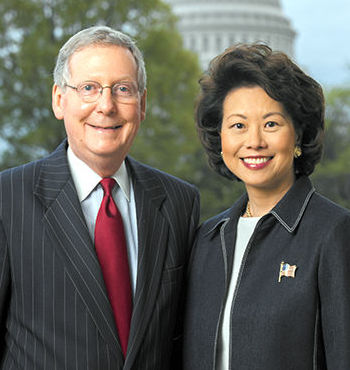
McConnell and his wife, Elaine Chao, January 2019

=== Family ===
McConnell is a Southern Baptist, baptized at age 8. He was married to his first wife, Sherrill Redmon, from 1968 to 1980 and had three daughters, Porter, Eleanor (Elly), and Claire. Porter McConnell is the campaign director for Take on Wall Street, a left-wing advocacy coalition. After divorcing McConnell, Redmon became a feminist scholar at Smith College and director of the Sophia Smith Collection.

McConnell's second wife, whom he married in 1993, is Elaine Chao, Secretary of Labor under President George W. Bush and Secretary of Transportation during President Donald Trump's first term.

In May 2019, McConnell's brother-in-law Gordon Hartogensis, who is married to Chao's sister Grace, was confirmed by the U.S. Senate as director of the Pension Benefit Guaranty Corporation (PBGC), a part of the Labor Department. McConnell voted to confirm.

=== Health ===
In February 2003, McConnell underwent triple bypass surgery at the National Naval Medical Center in Bethesda, Maryland, in relation to blocked arteries.

Since 2019, McConnell has had several health incidents related to falls. In August 2019, he fractured his shoulder in a fall at his Louisville home. In March 2023, he was hospitalized for five days after a fall; he was treated for a concussion and a minor rib fracture, and did not return to the Senate for almost six weeks. In July 2023, he fell while disembarking from a plane at Ronald Reagan Washington National Airport. On December 10, 2024, McConnell fell during a Senate Republican Conference policy luncheon, spraining his wrist and cutting his face. On October 16, 2025, he fell at the U.S. Capitol Building while being doorstepped by an amateur reporter, whose cameraman recorded the incident.

On July 26, 2023, McConnell prompted worldwide media reports when he froze, unspeaking, for around 20 seconds while addressing a press conference. He was escorted away by aides, but returned a few minutes later and said he was "fine". Two days after the incident, his spokespersons said he would continue in his leadership role; he is the institution's longest-serving party leader. On August 30, 2023, he again froze during a press conference in Covington, Kentucky, and was eventually led away by staff. A day later, McConnell released a letter from the attending physician of Congress that said he was "medically clear" to continue his schedule as planned; the letter said that the physician had talked to McConnell and "conferred with his neurology team", but not that he had physically examined McConnell.

==== 2026 ====
In February 2026, McConnell was hospitalized for eight days for "flu-like symptoms". On June 14, he was found unconscious at his home and was rushed to a hospital. (Note: Attributed to multiple references:) First responders determined that he was in cardiac arrest and performed cardiopulmonary resuscitation. In early July, McConnell's office refused to say whether he was conscious in the hospital. His wife, Elaine Chao, who was in China for philanthropic work, returned to the U.S. on July 7. The same day, spokespersons for U.S. senators John Thune and John Barrasso said those senators had spoken with McConnell by phone and discussed a variety of issues. On July 8, Kentucky governor Andy Beshear requested that McConnell update Kentuckians about his health.

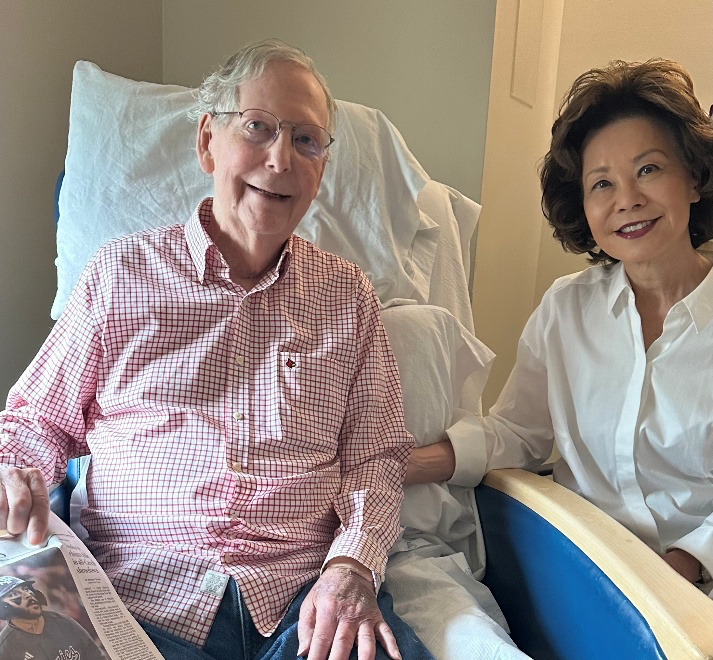
McConnell in a hospital bed with his wife Elaine Chao on July 12, 2026

On July 12, McConnell released a photo of himself in the hospital with his wife. His accompanying statement said that he had been hospitalized for a fall, that he had briefly become unconscious, and that he was being treated for a mild case of pneumonia. On July 27, McConnell's office said that he was doing intense physical therapy, that his childhood bout of polio was a complicating factor, and that he was not yet cleared to leave the rehabilitation facility and return to work. On August 6, McConnell released a statement saying he had been discharged from the rehabilitation center and would continue his recovery and work at his home. He returned to the Senate on September 14 and cast a tie-breaking vote to confirm Matthew R. Byrne as a U.S. district judge for the Southern District of Ohio.

The manner of McConnell's return prompted further scrutiny and discussion about his mental fitness for office. Reporters were barred from filming discussions with him, and videos on social media showed him being pushed in a wheelchair and communicating with reporters only through hand gestures like "thumbs-up" or a "peace sign". C-SPAN reported that aides intervened after he initially voted "no" on a Republican-led update to the Farm Bill, advising that he change his vote, which he then did.

On November 8, a video was released on social media of McConnell being asked by a journalist for his reaction to the 2026 midterm elections. McConnell did not answer and appeared to be confused by the questions, with an aide telling the journalist to direct her questions to his press office instead.

=== Other ===
In 1997, McConnell founded the James Madison Center for Free Speech, a legal-defense organization based in Washington, D.C. He was inducted into the Sons of the American Revolution on March 1, 2013. He is on the Board of Selectors of Jefferson Awards for Public Service.

In 2018, OpenSecrets ranked McConnell as one of the wealthiest members of the U.S. Senate, with a net worth of more than $34 million. In 2008, he and his wife received a gift worth between $5 million and $25 million from her father, James S. C. Chao. The gift followed the death of Ruth Mulan Chu Chao, McConnell's mother-in-law. Estimates place McConnell's net worth in excess of $65 million as of 2026.

== In popular culture ==
During his 2014 campaign, McConnell was lampooned for posting campaign B-roll footage online for use by allied PACs, "a practice circumventing campaign finance rules barring coordination used by both Republicans and Democrats", today identified as one of the "magic signals" used to help define red-boxing. Comedian/talk show host Jon Stewart, sarcastically interpreting the B-rolls as an invitation to make a "game" out of setting the footage to humorously fitting songs for which he provided his own examples, termed this practice "McConnelling", and encouraged his viewers to participate. Having gone viral, different takes of the meme from various internet posters received hundreds of thousands of views on YouTube, which satirically interspersed the B-roll with footage from sitcoms and movies and with popular music.

Stewart repeatedly mocked McConnell on The Daily Show for resembling a turtle or tortoise. Beck Bennett has portrayed McConnell in sketches on Saturday Night Live. In 2017, McConnell was portrayed satirically in South Park's season 21 episode "Doubling Down". Comedian and impressionist Matt Friend has often impersonated McConnell, particularly in regard to how his public appearance has changed due to his medical issues.

McConnell's detractors have called him a number of nicknames, including "Moscow Mitch", "Cocaine Mitch", the "Grim Reaper", "Darth Vader", "Rich Mitch", "Nuclear Mitch", "Midnight Mitch", and "Old Crow". McConnell embraced several of them but strenuously objected to "Moscow Mitch". (Note: Reasons cited for McConnell's opposition to the nickname include "a longstanding resistance to federal control over state elections, newly enacted security improvements that were shown to have worked in the 2018 voting and his suspicion that Democrats are trying to gain partisan advantage with a host of proposals".)

The information vacuum surrounding McConnell's health status during his 2026 hospitalization and the impact of his absence from the Senate—which does not permit proxy votes—drew comparisons to the mental acuity of Joe Biden and Dianne Feinstein toward the ends of their political careers, and even with the death of Francisco Franco. Aspects of the situation also prompted numerous black humor memes and, more generally, parallels with the 1989 dark comedy Weekend at Bernie's.

== See also ==
- 2010s in the United States
- Russian interference in the 2016 United States elections

== Notes ==
Legal offices
| Preceded by Vincent Rakestraw | United States Assistant Attorney General for the Office of Legislative Affairs; Acting; 1975 | Succeeded by Michael Uhlmann |
Political offices
| Preceded by Todd Hollenbach as County Judge of Jefferson County | Judge-Executive of Jefferson County; 1978–1984 | Succeeded by Bremer Ehrler |
Party political offices
| Preceded by Louie R. Guenthner Jr. | Republican nominee for U.S. Senator from Kentucky (Class 2); 1984, 1990, 1996, 2002, 2008, 2014, 2020 | Succeeded by Andy Barr |
| Preceded by Al D'Amato | Chair of the National Republican Senatorial Committee; 1997–2001 | Succeeded by Bill Frist |
| Preceded by Don Nickles | Senate Republican Whip; 2003–2007 | Succeeded by Trent Lott |
| Preceded by Bill Frist | Senate Republican Leader; 2007–2025 | Succeeded by John Thune |
U.S. Senate
| Preceded by Walter Huddleston | U.S. Senator (Class 2) from Kentucky; 1985–present Served alongside: Wendell Ford, Jim Bunning, Rand Paul | Incumbent |
| Preceded by Warren Rudman | Ranking Member of the Senate Ethics Committee; 1993–1995 | Succeeded by Richard Bryan |
| Preceded by Richard Bryan | Chair of the Senate Ethics Committee; 1995–1997 | Succeeded by Bob Smith |
| Preceded by John Warner | Chair of the Senate Rules Committee; 1999–2001 | Succeeded by Chris Dodd |
| Preceded by John Warner | Chair of the Joint Inaugural Ceremonies Committee; 2000–2001 | Succeeded by Trent Lott |
| Preceded by Chris Dodd | Ranking Member of the Senate Rules Committee; 2001 | Succeeded by Chris Dodd |
| Preceded by Chris Dodd | Chair of the Senate Rules Committee; 2001 | Succeeded by Chris Dodd |
| Preceded by Chris Dodd | Ranking Member of the Senate Rules Committee; 2001–2003 | Succeeded by Chris Dodd |
| Preceded by Harry Reid | Senate Majority Whip; 2003–2007 | Succeeded by Dick Durbin |
| Preceded by Harry Reid | Senate Minority Leader; 2007–2015 | Succeeded by Harry Reid |
| Preceded by Harry Reid | Senate Majority Leader; 2015–2021 | Succeeded by Chuck Schumer |
| Preceded by Chuck Schumer | Senate Minority Leader; 2021–2025 | Succeeded by Chuck Schumer |
| Preceded by Amy Klobuchar | Chair of the Senate Rules Committee; 2025–present | Incumbent |
| Preceded by Bryan Steil | Chair of the Joint Printing Committee; 2025–present | Incumbent |
U.S. order of precedence (ceremonial)
| Preceded by Dick Durbin as Senate Minority Whip | Order of precedence in the United States as United States Senator | Succeeded by Patty Murray |
| Preceded by Chuck Grassley | United States senators by seniority 2nd | Succeeded by Patty Murray |
