= 2015 Kentucky gubernatorial election =

- November 3, 2015
- Turnout: 30.6% (▲2.0%)
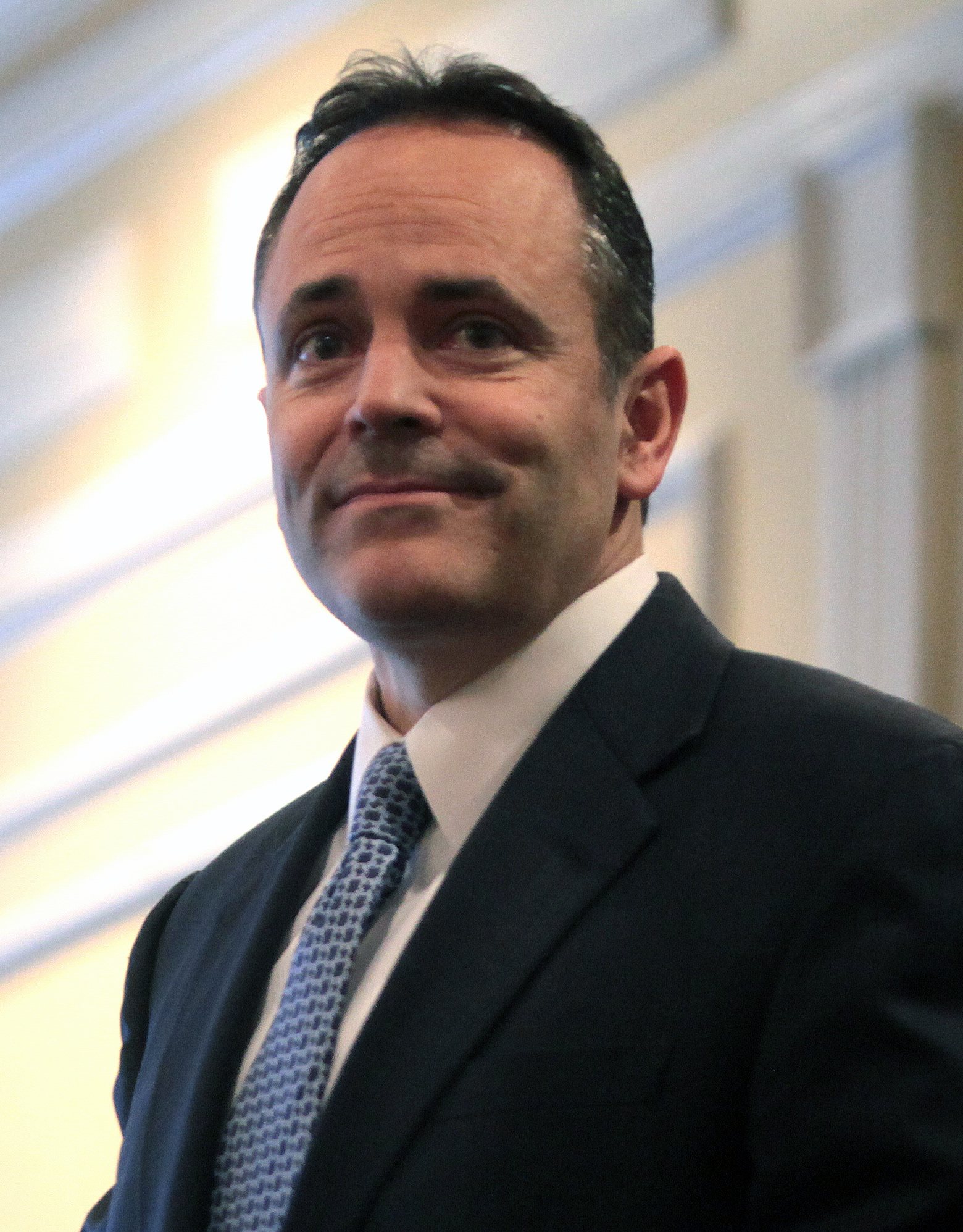

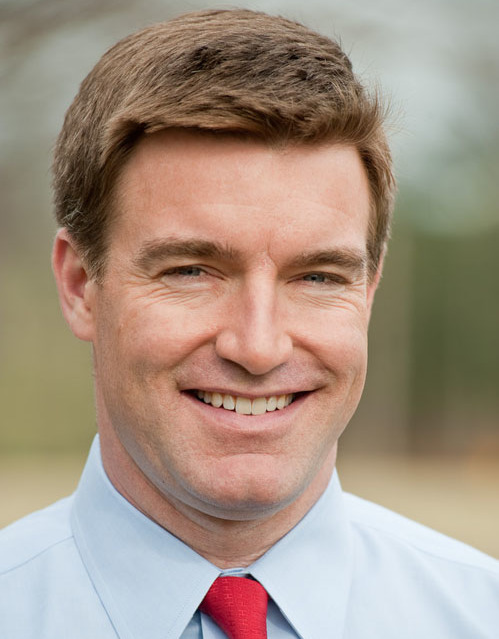
Nominee	Matt Bevin	Jack Conway
Party	Republican	Democratic
Running mate	Jenean Hampton	Sannie Overly
Popular vote	511,374	426,620
Percentage	52.52%	43.81%
- Bevin: 40–50% 50–60% 60–70% 70–80% 80–90% Conway: 40–50% 50–60% 60–70% 70–80% 80–90%
Governor before election
Steve Beshear
Democratic
Elected Governor
Matt Bevin
Republican

The 2015 Kentucky gubernatorial election took place on November 3, 2015. Incumbent Democratic governor Steve Beshear was ineligible to run for a third term due to term limits. Primary elections were held on May 19, 2015.

Despite trailing in most pre-election polls, Republican nominee Matt Bevin defeated Democratic nominee Jack Conway by a margin of 52.5% to 43.8% in the general election. Statewide turnout in this election was 30%. With a margin of 8.7%, this election was the closest race of the 2015 gubernatorial election cycle. This was the first time since 2003 that a Republican was elected governor of Kentucky, and the most recent time that this has occurred.

This is the only instance in history in which Knott County has backed a Republican candidate for governor. This was the only Democratic-held governorship up for election in 2015.

== Democratic primary ==
=== Candidates ===
==== Declared ====
- Jack Conway, attorney general of Kentucky (2008–2016) and nominee for the U.S. Senate in 2010

- Running mate: Sannie Overly, state representative

- Geoff Young, retired engineer and candidate for Kentucky's 6th congressional district in 2014

- Running mate: Johnathan Masters
- Former running mate: Cherokee Schill

==== Declined ====
- Jerry Abramson, White House Director of Intergovernmental Affairs, former lieutenant governor of Kentucky and former mayor of Louisville
- Rocky Adkins, majority leader of the Kentucky House of Representatives
- Ben Chandler, former U.S. representative, former attorney general of Kentucky and nominee for governor in 2003
- Luther Deaton, banker
- Adam Edelen, state auditor of Kentucky (ran for re-election)
- Greg Fischer, mayor of Louisville
- Alison Lundergan Grimes, secretary of state of Kentucky and nominee for the U.S. Senate in 2014 (ran for re-election)
- Crit Luallen, lieutenant governor of Kentucky and former state auditor of Kentucky
- Daniel Mongiardo, former lieutenant governor of Kentucky and nominee for the U.S. Senate in 2004
- Greg Stumbo, speaker of the Kentucky House of Representatives, former attorney general of Kentucky and candidate for lieutenant governor in 2007
- John Yarmuth, U.S. representative

=== Endorsements ===
Jack Conway/Sannie Overly

Statewide elected officials

- Wendell H. Ford, former U.S. senator and former governor
- Crit Luallen, lieutenant governor of Kentucky and former state auditor of Kentucky
- Alison Lundergan Grimes, secretary of state of Kentucky
- John Yarmuth, U.S. representative

Individuals

- Dan Boaz, McCracken County commonwealth's attorney
- Les Burgett, Perry County sheriff
- Bobby Carpenter, Greenup County judge/executive
- John Estill, Mason County attorney
- John Gardner, Barren and Metcalfe counties commonwealth's attorney
- Steve Gold, Henderson County attorney
- Elisabeth Jensen, education advocate and nominee for Kentucky's 6th congressional district in 2014
- Jim King, Louisville Metro Council president
- David O'Neill, Fayette County property valuation administrator
- G.L. Ovey, Lyon County commonwealth's attorney
- Mike Pryor, Nicholas County judge/executive
- Tommy Turner, LaRue County judge/executive
- Jim Ward, Letcher County Judge/Executive
- G. Davis Wilson, Bourbon County attorney
- David Yates, Louisville Metro councilman
- Shane Young, Hardin County commonwealth's attorney

Members of the Kentucky legislature

- Denver Butler, former state representative
- Larry Clark, state representative and former speaker pro tem of the Kentucky House of Representatives
- Leslie Combs, state representative
- Mike Denham, state representative
- Jeff Donohue, state representative
- Kelly Flood, state representative
- Ray Jones II, state senator
- Morgan McGarvey, state senator
- Gerald Neal, state senator
- Jerry Rhoads, former state senator
- Dorsey Ridley, state senator
- Rita Smart, state representative
- Doc Watkins, state representative
- Ed Worley, former minority leader of the Kentucky Senate and former state senator

Organizations

- International Brotherhood of Electrical Workers Local 369
- Jefferson County Teachers Association
- Teamsters Joint Council 94

=== Polling ===
Poll source	Date(s) administered	Sample size	Margin of error	Jack Conway	Geoff Young	Undecided
Survey USA	May 5–10, 2015	707	± 3.5%	68%	13%	19%
Survey USA	March 3–8, 2015	640	± 3.9%	61%	12%	27%
Harper Polling	January 28–31, 2015	255	± 6.14%	59%	13%	28%

=== Results ===
Results by county: Conway: 60–70%; 70–80%; 80–90%

Democratic primary results
Party	Candidate	Votes	%
Democratic	Jack Conway; Sannie Overly	140,627	78.8%
Democratic	Geoff Young; Johnathan Masters	37,887	21.2%
Total votes		178,514	100.0%

== Republican primary ==
=== Candidates ===
==== Declared ====
- Matt Bevin, businessman and candidate for U.S. Senate in 2014

- Running mate: Jenean Hampton, former chairwoman of the Bowling Green/Southern Kentucky Tea Party and nominee for the 20th Kentucky House district in 2014

- James Comer, agriculture commissioner of Kentucky, 2012–2016; and former state representative, 2001-2012

- Running mate: Christian McDaniel, state senator, 2013–present

- Hal Heiner, former member of the Louisville Metro Council, 2003–2010; and nominee for mayor of Louisville in 2010

- Running mate: K.C. Crosbie, former Lexington-Fayette Urban County councilwoman, 2006–2014; former finance chairwoman and national chairwoman for the Republican Party of Kentucky, and nominee for Kentucky state treasurer in 2011

- Will T. Scott, former associate justice of the Kentucky Supreme Court, 2005–2015; nominee for attorney general of Kentucky in 1995 and for KY-07 in 1988 and 1990

- Running mate: Rodney Coffey, former Menifee County sheriff, 1999–2014; Kentucky Sheriffs Association president, 2014-2015

==== Withdrew ====
- Robert Lee Rosier, U.S. Army veteran

- Running mate: John Yuen, candidate for the State Senate in 2012

==== Declined ====
- Cathy Bailey, businesswoman and former United States Ambassador to Latvia
- Andy Barr, U.S. representative
- Jess Correll, banker
- Richie Farmer, former agriculture commissioner of Kentucky
- Ernie Fletcher, former governor and former U.S. representative
- Trey Grayson, former secretary of state of Kentucky and candidate for the U.S. Senate in 2010
- Brett Guthrie, U.S. representative
- Thomas Massie, U.S. representative
- Mitch McConnell, U.S. senator and Senate majority leader
- Phil Moffett, businessman, Tea Party activist and candidate for governor in 2011
- Rand Paul, U.S. senator and 2016 presidential candidate
- David L. Williams, judge on the Kentucky Circuit Courts, former president of the Kentucky Senate and nominee for governor in 2011

=== Endorsements ===
James Comer/Chris McDaniel

Individuals

- Jim Bunning, former U.S. senator
- Julie Denton, state senator
- Ron Lewis, former U.S. representative
- Thomas Massie, U.S. representative for Kentucky's 4th congressional district
- Anne Northup, former U.S. representative and candidate for governor in 2007
- Ed Whitfield, U.S. representative

Organizations

- Associated General Contractors
Hal Heiner/K.C. Crosbie

Individuals

- Rebecca Jackson, former Jefferson County judge/executive and candidate for governor in 2003

Organizations

- Kentucky Pastors Action Coalition
Matt Bevin/Jenean Hampton

Individuals

- Hugh Hewitt, author and talk radio personality
- Sally Oh, co-founder of the Lexington Tea Party

Newspapers

- Cincinnati Enquirer

=== Polling ===
Poll source	Date(s) administered	Sample size	Margin of error	Cathy Bailey	Matt Bevin	James Comer	Hal Heiner	Will T. Scott	Undecided
Survey USA	May 5–10, 2015	517	± 4.4%	—	27%	26%	25%	8%	14%
Public Policy Polling	May 6–7, 2015	501	± 4.4%	—	25%	28%	27%	—	20%
Triumph Campaigns	March 26, 2015	601	± 4%	—	12%	19%	33%	3%	29%
Survey USA	March 3–8, 2015	520	± 4.4%	—	20%	20%	28%	8%	25%
Harper Polling	January 28–31, 2015	261	± 6.07%	—	18%	25%	19%	9%	30%
Remington Research	January 27–28, 2015	1,000	± ?	—	19%	22%	18%	5%	26%
Public Policy Polling	August 7–10, 2014	383	± ?	11%	25%	20%	18%	—	26%
Public Policy Polling	August 7–10, 2014	383	± ?	—	—	22%	28%	—	50%
Public Opinion Strategies	February 26–27, 2014	400	± 4.9%	—	—	42%	14%	—	13%

=== Results ===
Results by county: Bevin: 30–40%; 40–50%; 50–60%; Comer: 20–30%; 30–40%; 40–50%; 50–60%; 60–70%; 70–80%; 80–90%; 90–100%; Heiner: 20–30%; 30–40%; 40–50%; 50–60%; Scott: 30–40%; 60–70%; Tie: 20–30%

On May 19, 2015, Matt Bevin won the Republican primary, defeating second-place finisher James Comer by 83 votes.

Republican primary results
Party	Candidate	Votes	%
Republican	Matt Bevin; Jenean Hampton	70,480	32.91%
Republican	James Comer; Christian McDaniel	70,397	32.89%
Republican	Hal Heiner; KC Crosbie	57,951	27.10%
Republican	Will T. Scott; Rodney Coffey	15,365	7.20%
Total votes		214,187	100.00%

== Independents ==
=== Candidates ===
==== Declared ====
- Drew Curtis, entrepreneur and founder and CEO of Fark.com

- Running mate: Heather Curtis, COO of Fark.com and wife of Drew Curtis

- Gatewood Galbraith (formerly Terrill Wayne Newman), social worker (distinguish from politician Gatewood Galbraith)

- Running mate: Elisabeth Anderson, retired legal secretary

== General election ==
=== Predictions ===
Source	Ranking	As of
The Cook Political Report	Tossup	October 26, 2015
Rothenberg Political Report	Tilt D	October 27, 2015
Sabato's Crystal Ball	Lean D	October 29, 2015
DKE	Tossup	October 29, 2015

=== Polling ===
Poll source	Date(s) administered	Sample size	Margin of error	Jack Conway (D)	Matt Bevin (R)	Drew Curtis (I)	Undecided
Vox Populi	October 26–27, 2015	618	± 3.9%	44%	44%	6%	6%
Vox Populi	October 26–27, 2015	618	± 3.9%	43%	46%	6%	7%
Survey USA	October 23–26, 2015	798	± 3.5%	45%	40%	6%	10%
WKU Social Science Research Center	October 19–25, 2015	770	± 3.5%	45%	40%	7%	8%
Mason-Dixon	October 6–8, 2015	625	± 4%	43%	41%	6%	10%
Survey USA	September 22–27, 2015	701	± 3.8%	42%	37%	7%	15%
Survey USA	July 22–28, 2015	685	± 3.8%	43%	38%	8%	11%
Survey USA	July 22–28, 2015	685	± 3.8%	45%	42%	—	13%
Public Policy Polling	June 18–21, 2015	1,108	± 2.9%	35%	38%	6%	21%
Public Policy Polling	June 18–21, 2015	1,108	± 2.9%	38%	40%	—	22%
Survey USA	May 5–10, 2015	1,677	± 2.4%	48%	37%	—	16%
Survey USA	March 3–8, 2015	1,917	± 2.3%	42%	36%	—	22%
Harper Polling	January 28–29, 2015	640	± 3.87%	45%	41%	—	14%
Gravis Marketing	January 5–6, 2015	608	± 4%	44%	36%	—	20%
Public Policy Polling	August 7–10, 2014	991	± 3.1%	39%	36%	—	25%

Hypothetical polling

Conway vs. Bailey

Poll source	Date(s) administered	Sample size	Margin of error	Jack Conway (D)	Cathy Bailey (R)	Other	Undecided
Gravis Marketing	January 5–6, 2015	608	± 4%	43%	30%	—	27%
Public Policy Polling	August 7–10, 2014	991	± 3.1%	42%	30%	—	28%

Conway vs. Comer

Poll source	Date(s) administered	Sample size	Margin of error	Jack Conway (D)	James Comer (R)	Other	Undecided
Survey USA	May 5–10, 2015	1,677	± 2.4%	45%	39%	—	16%
Survey USA	March 3–8, 2015	1,917	± 2.3%	40%	38%	—	22%
Harper Polling	January 28–29, 2015	640	± 3.87%	41%	45%	—	14%
Gravis Marketing	January 5–6, 2015	608	± 4%	40%	37%	—	23%
Garin-Hart-Yang*	December 19–21, 2014	608	± 4%	48%	36%	—	16%
Public Policy Polling	August 7–10, 2014	991	± 3.1%	38%	35%	—	27%

Conway vs. Heiner

Poll source	Date(s) administered	Sample size	Margin of error	Jack Conway (D)	Hal Heiner (R)	Other	Undecided
Survey USA	May 5–10, 2015	1,677	± 2.4%	48%	36%	—	16%
Survey USA	March 3–8, 2015	1,917	± 2.3%	41%	38%	—	21%
Harper Polling	January 28–29, 2015	640	± 3.87%	42%	44%	—	14%
Gravis Marketing	January 5–6, 2015	608	± 4%	43%	34%	—	22%
Garin-Hart-Yang*	December 19–21, 2014	608	± 4%	51%	30%	—	19%
Public Policy Polling	August 7–10, 2014	991	± 3.1%	39%	32%	—	28%
Gravis Marketing	July 17–20, 2014	1,054	± 3%	45%	36%	—	19%

Conway vs. Scott

Poll source	Date(s) administered	Sample size	Margin of error	Jack Conway (D)	Will T. Scott (R)	Other	Undecided
Survey USA	May 5–10, 2015	1,677	± 2.4%	48%	32%	—	20%
Survey USA	March 3–8, 2015	1,917	± 2.3%	43%	33%	—	24%
Harper Polling	January 28–29, 2015	640	± 3.87%	44%	40%	—	16%

- * Poll for the Kentucky Democratic Party

=== Results ===
2015 Kentucky gubernatorial election
Party	Candidate	Votes	%	±%
Republican	Matt Bevin; Jenean Hampton	511,374	52.52	+17.23
Democratic	Jack Conway; Sannie Overly	426,620	43.81	−11.91
Independent	Drew Curtis; Heather Curtis	35,597	3.66	N/A
Write-in	Blackii Effing Whyte; Philip Jacobs	71	0.01	N/A
Write-in	Gatewood B. Gatewood; Elisabeth Anderson	30	0.00	N/A
Total votes		973,692	100.0	N/A
Turnout		978,767	30.57	+1.96
Registered electors		3,201,847		
Republican gain from Democratic				

==== By county ====
County	Matt Bevin (R)		Jack Conway (D)		All Others		Total votes cast
County	%	#	%	#	%	#	Total votes cast
Adair	66.33%	2,727	30.84%	1,268	2.82%	116	4,111
Allen	69.00%	2,344	28.76%	977	2.24%	76	3,397
Anderson	55.34%	3,724	39.16%	2,635	5.50%	370	6,729
Ballard	55.20%	1,312	41.65%	990	3.16%	75	2,377
Barren	57.40%	5,289	38.72%	3,568	3.88%	358	9,215
Bath	46.65%	1,045	49.87%	1,117	3.48%	78	2,240
Bell	58.60%	2,425	37.60%	1,556	3.79%	157	4,138
Boone	65.78%	15,842	30.80%	7,418	3.41%	822	24,082
Bourbon	45.34%	2,202	51.68%	2,510	2.99%	145	4,857
Boyd	51.70%	4,747	45.24%	4,154	3.06%	281	9,182
Boyle	54.72%	3,968	40.65%	2,948	4.63%	336	7,252
Bracken	53.78%	854	42.82%	680	3.40%	54	1,588
Breathitt	49.81%	1,313	45.83%	1,208	4.36%	115	2,636
Breckinridge	56.78%	2,648	39.84%	1,858	3.39%	158	4,664
Bullitt	57.86%	9,856	38.11%	6,492	4.03%	686	17,034
Butler	67.24%	1,786	30.38%	807	2.37%	63	2,656
Caldwell	58.97%	1,838	37.86%	1,180	3.18%	99	3,117
Calloway	55.44%	4,742	41.59%	3,558	2.97%	254	8,554
Campbell	54.15%	10,671	41.90%	8,258	3.95%	779	19,708
Carlisle	60.66%	899	37.85%	561	1.48%	22	1,482
Carroll	46.61%	867	49.62%	923	3.76%	70	1,860
Carter	53.62%	2,405	43.57%	1,954	2.81%	126	4,485
Casey	79.31%	2,836	18.15%	649	2.54%	91	3,576
Christian	56.91%	4,830	40.60%	3,446	2.49%	211	8,487
Clark	54.55%	4,551	41.33%	3,448	4.12%	344	8,343
Clay	71.11%	2,311	26.65%	866	2.25%	73	3,250
Clinton	76.36%	1,531	22.14%	444	1.50%	30	2,005
Crittenden	65.52%	1,450	31.86%	705	2.62%	58	2,213
Cumberland	70.93%	927	26.17%	342	2.91%	38	1,307
Daviess	55.12%	13,483	42.38%	10,366	2.50%	611	24,460
Edmonson	63.02%	1,503	33.75%	805	3.23%	77	2,385
Elliott	40.21%	495	57.35%	706	2.44%	30	1,231
Estill	63.08%	1,770	31.72%	890	5.20%	146	2,806
Fayette	39.72%	27,788	54.64%	38,220	5.64%	3,945	69,953
Fleming	57.65%	1,907	38.81%	1,284	3.54%	117	3,308
Floyd	42.04%	3,390	54.46%	4,392	3.50%	282	8,064
Franklin	35.20%	5,942	58.29%	9,839	6.51%	1,098	16,879
Fulton	51.45%	568	45.65%	504	2.90%	32	1,104
Gallatin	56.16%	739	39.89%	525	3.95%	52	1,316
Garrard	65.67%	2,542	29.91%	1,158	4.42%	171	3,871
Grant	62.51%	2,433	34.07%	1,326	3.42%	133	3,892
Graves	60.84%	5,370	36.13%	3,189	3.04%	268	8,827
Grayson	62.86%	3,246	33.54%	1,732	3.60%	186	5,164
Green	69.66%	2,018	27.82%	806	2.52%	73	2,897
Greenup	57.12%	4,432	40.07%	3,109	2.81%	218	7,759
Hancock	49.93%	1,114	47.69%	1,064	2.38%	53	2,231
Hardin	56.71%	11,586	39.30%	8,029	3.99%	815	20,430
Harlan	62.34%	3,099	33.61%	1,671	4.04%	201	4,971
Harrison	51.15%	2,093	43.45%	1,778	5.40%	221	4,092
Hart	57.48%	2,043	38.80%	1,379	3.71%	132	3,554
Henderson	47.19%	4,837	49.92%	5,117	2.90%	297	10,251
Henry	52.75%	2,126	42.68%	1,720	4.57%	184	4,030
Hickman	61.43%	771	36.49%	458	2.07%	26	1,255
Hopkins	60.48%	5,802	36.73%	3,524	2.79%	268	9,594
Jackson	83.36%	2,310	14.18%	393	2.45%	68	2,771
Jefferson	38.57%	74,427	58.16%	112,232	3.27%	6,302	192,961
Jessamine	61.93%	7,581	33.77%	4,134	4.30%	526	12,241
Johnson	65.39%	3,040	30.80%	1,432	3.81%	177	4,649
Kenton	57.25%	18,007	39.11%	12,301	3.64%	1,145	31,453
Knott	55.88%	1,612	39.55%	1,141	4.58%	132	2,885
Knox	67.35%	3,706	29.69%	1,634	2.96%	163	5,503
Larue	59.79%	2,009	36.13%	1,214	4.08%	137	3,360
Laurel	74.48%	8,781	22.59%	2,663	2.93%	345	11,789
Lawrence	60.87%	1,616	36.65%	973	2.49%	66	2,655
Lee	67.84%	1,042	27.47%	422	4.69%	72	1,536
Leslie	77.43%	1,654	20.18%	431	2.39%	51	2,136
Letcher	54.65%	2,360	41.11%	1,775	4.24%	183	4,318
Lewis	73.56%	1,833	23.43%	584	3.01%	75	2,492
Lincoln	64.36%	3,289	31.82%	1,626	3.82%	195	5,110
Livingston	57.49%	1,340	39.77%	927	2.75%	64	2,331
Logan	58.49%	2,345	39.04%	1,565	2.47%	99	4,009
Lyon	52.32%	1,208	45.17%	1,043	2.51%	58	2,309
Madison	55.87%	10,268	39.98%	7,348	4.16%	764	18,380
Magoffin	53.86%	1,229	43.25%	987	2.89%	66	2,282
Marion	41.20%	1,591	55.20%	2,132	3.60%	139	3,862
Marshall	53.26%	5,969	43.09%	4,830	3.65%	409	11,208
Martin	73.25%	1,268	24.21%	419	2.54%	44	1,731
Mason	52.43%	1,792	44.79%	1,531	2.78%	95	3,418
McCracken	58.42%	9,028	39.03%	6,031	2.55%	394	15,453
McCreary	65.42%	1,362	31.12%	648	3.46%	72	2,082
McLean	56.57%	1,364	40.81%	984	2.61%	63	2,411
Meade	51.37%	3,310	44.04%	2,838	4.59%	296	6,444
Menifee	53.60%	1,160	41.45%	897	4.94%	107	2,164
Mercer	60.22%	3,517	35.17%	2,054	4.61%	269	5,840
Metcalfe	57.76%	1,344	38.16%	888	4.08%	95	2,327
Monroe	67.32%	1,642	29.56%	721	3.12%	76	2,439
Montgomery	54.61%	3,271	41.39%	2,479	4.01%	240	5,990
Morgan	54.93%	1,355	40.90%	1,009	4.18%	103	2,467
Muhlenberg	49.30%	3,613	47.12%	3,453	3.58%	262	7,328
Nelson	48.35%	4,902	48.14%	4,880	3.51%	356	10,138
Nicholas	38.20%	563	58.14%	857	3.66%	54	1,474
Ohio	59.41%	3,115	38.15%	2,000	2.44%	128	5,243
Oldham	60.54%	10,896	35.58%	6,403	3.88%	699	17,998
Owen	56.10%	1,444	38.85%	1,000	5.05%	130	2,574
Owsley	70.47%	580	26.73%	220	2.79%	23	823
Pendleton	59.92%	1,567	35.79%	936	4.28%	112	2,615
Perry	62.00%	3,276	35.14%	1,857	2.86%	151	5,284
Pike	54.76%	6,146	42.24%	4,741	2.99%	336	11,223
Powell	52.48%	1,335	43.63%	1,110	3.89%	99	2,544
Pulaski	72.00%	10,623	24.83%	3,664	3.17%	467	14,754
Robertson	53.12%	247	43.44%	202	3.44%	16	465
Rockcastle	74.33%	2,536	21.81%	744	3.87%	132	3,412
Rowan	46.67%	2,179	49.71%	2,321	3.62%	169	4,669
Russell	72.08%	3,312	24.90%	1,144	3.03%	139	4,595
Scott	51.32%	6,165	43.55%	5,232	5.14%	617	12,014
Shelby	56.74%	6,573	39.49%	4,575	3.76%	436	11,584
Simpson	59.57%	1,652	38.19%	1,059	2.24%	62	2,773
Spencer	62.84%	3,169	33.81%	1,705	3.35%	169	5,043
Taylor	61.28%	3,852	35.95%	2,260	2.77%	174	6,286
Todd	62.23%	903	34.67%	503	3.10%	45	1,451
Trigg	55.01%	1,746	42.28%	1,342	2.71%	86	3,174
Trimble	54.51%	1,033	42.06%	797	3.43%	65	1,895
Union	47.53%	1,829	50.10%	1,928	2.36%	91	3,848
Warren	55.17%	12,411	41.58%	9,354	3.25%	730	22,495
Washington	57.38%	1,796	38.50%	1,205	4.12%	129	3,130
Wayne	64.54%	2,412	33.15%	1,239	2.30%	86	3,737
Webster	55.82%	1,567	41.61%	1,168	2.57%	72	2,807
Whitley	69.73%	4,772	27.13%	1,857	3.14%	215	6,844
Wolfe	46.15%	689	51.11%	763	2.75%	41	1,493
Woodford	47.53%	3,804	46.28%	3,704	6.19%	495	8,003

Counties that flipped from Democratic to Republican

- Anderson (largest city: Lawrenceburg)
- Ballard (largest city: LaCenter)
- Barren (largest city: Glasgow)
- Bell (largest city: Middlesboro)
- Boyle (largest city: Danville)
- Bracken (largest city: Augusta)
- Breathitt (largest city: Jackson)
- Breckinridge (largest city: Hardinsburg)
- Bullitt (largest city: Mount Washington)
- Butler (largest city: Morgantown)
- Caldwell (largest city: Princeton)
- Calloway (largest city: Murray)
- Campbell (largest city: Fort Thomas)
- Carlisle (largest city: Bardwell)
- Carter (largest city: Grayson)
- Christian (largest city: Hopkinsville)
- Clark (largest city: Winchester)
- Daviess (largest city: Owensboro)
- Fleming (largest city: Flemingsburg)
- Fulton (largest city: Fulton)
- Gallatin (largest city: Warsaw)
- Garrard (largest city: Lancaster)
- Grant (largest city: Williamstown)
- Graves (largest city: Mayfield)
- Grayson (largest city: Leitchfield)
- Green (largest city: Greensburg)
- Greenup (largest city: Flatwoods)
- Hancock (largest city: Hawesville)
- Hardin (largest city: Elizabethtown)
- Harrison (largest city: Cynthiana)
- Hart (largest city: Horse Cave)
- Henry (largest city: Eminence)
- Hickman (largest city: Clinton)
- Hopkins (largest city: Madisonville)
- Jessamine (largest city: Nicholasville)
- Johnson (Largest city: Paintsville)
- Kenton (Largest city: Covington)
- Knott (largest municipality: Hindman)
- Knox (largest city: Barbourville)
- LaRue (largest city: Hodgenville)
- Lawrence (largest city: Louisa)
- Lincoln (largest city: Stanford)
- Livingston (largest city: Salem)
- Logan (largest city: Russellville)
- Lyon (largest city: Eddyville)
- Magoffin (largest city: Salyersville)
- Marshall (largest city: Benton)
- Madison (largest city: Richmond)
- Mason (largest city: Maysville)
- McCracken (largest city: Paducah)
- McLean (largest city: Livermore)
- Meade (largest city: Brandenburg)
- Menifee (largest municipality: Frenchburg)
- Mercer (largest city: Harrodsburg)
- Metcalfe (largest city: Edmonton)
- Montgomery (largest city: Mount Sterling)
- Morgan (largest city: West Liberty)
- Muhlenberg (largest city: Central City)
- Nelson (largest city: Bardstown)
- Ohio (largest city: Beaver Dam)
- Oldham (largest city: La Grange)
- Owen (largest city: Owenton)
- Pendleton (largest city: Falmouth)
- Powell (largest city: Stanton)
- Robertson (largest municipality: Mount Olivet)
- Scott (largest city: Georgetown)
- Shelby (largest city: Shelbyville)
- Simpson (largest city: Franklin)
- Spencer (largest city: Taylorsville)
- Taylor (largest city: Campbellsville)
- Warren (largest city: Bowling Green)
- Washington (largest city: Springfield)
- Webster (largest city: Providence)
- Woodford (largest city: Versailles)

==== By congressional district ====
Bevin won four of six congressional districts. Conway won the other two, including one held by a Republican.

District	Bevin	Conway	Representative
1st	58.01%	39.15%	Ed Whitfield
2nd	56.96%	39.45%	Brett Guthrie
3rd	37.63%	59.14%	John Yarmuth
4th	58.49%	37.83%	Thomas Massie
5th	62.74%	33.99%	Hal Rogers
6th	46.21%	48.65%	Andy Barr

== See also ==
- 2015 Kentucky elections
