= 2015 United States gubernatorial elections =

- November 3, 2015; November 21 (Louisiana runoff)

3 governorships (Note: Alaska's governorship was held by an independent, so the number of seats held by Democrats and Republicans added up to only 49.)
	Majority party	Minority party
Party	Republican	Democratic
Seats before	31	18
Seats after	31	18
Seat change	Steady	Steady
Popular vote	1,494,011	1,305,187
Percentage	52.52%	45.88%
Seats up	2	1
Seats won	2	1
- Map of the results Democratic gain Republican gain Republican hold No election

United States gubernatorial elections were held in three states in 2015 as part of the 2015 United States elections. In Kentucky and Mississippi, the elections were held on November 3, and in Louisiana, as no candidate received a majority of votes at the primary election on October 24, 2015, a runoff election was held on November 21. The last regular gubernatorial elections for all three states were in 2011. Democrats picked up the open seat of term-limited Republican Bobby Jindal in Louisiana, while Republicans re-elected incumbent Phil Bryant in Mississippi and picked up the seat of term-limited Democrat Steve Beshear in Kentucky.

As of 2026, this is the last time that Republicans won the governorship in Kentucky.

== Election predictions ==
Several sites and individuals publish predictions of competitive seats. These predictions look at factors such as the strength of the incumbent (if the incumbent is running for re-election), the strength of the candidates, and the partisan leanings of the state (reflected in part by the state's Cook Partisan Voting Index rating). The predictions assign ratings to each state, with the rating indicating the predicted advantage that a party has in winning that seat.

Most election predictors use:

- "tossup": no advantage
- "tilt" (used by some predictors): advantage that is not quite as strong as "lean"
- "lean": slight advantage
- "likely": significant, but surmountable, advantage
- "safe" or "solid": near-certain chance of victory

State	PVI	Incumbent	Last race	Cook Aug 25, 2016	IE Aug 21, 2015	Sabato Oct 29, 2015	DKE Oct 29, 2015	Result
Kentucky	R+13	Steve Beshear (term-limited)	55.72% D	Tossup	Tilt D	Lean D	Tossup	Bevin; 52.52% R (flip)
Louisiana	R+12	Bobby Jindal (term-limited)	65.80% R	Lean D (flip)	Tossup	Lean D (flip)	Tossup	Edwards; 56.11% D (flip)
Mississippi	R+9	Phil Bryant	60.98% R	Solid R	Solid R	Safe R	Safe R	Bryant; 66.24% R

== Race summary ==
State	Incumbent			Results	
State	Governor	Party	First elected	Status	Candidates
Kentucky	Steve Beshear	Democratic	2007	Incumbent term-limited. New governor elected. Republican gain.	▌ ✓ Matt Bevin (Republican) 52.5%; ▌Jack Conway (Democratic) 43.8%; ▌Drew Curtis (Independent) 3.7%
Louisiana	Bobby Jindal	Republican	2007	Incumbent term-limited. New governor elected. Democratic gain.	▌ ✓ John Bel Edwards (Democratic) 56.1%; ▌David Vitter (Republican) 43.9%
Mississippi	Phil Bryant	Republican	2011	Incumbent re-elected.	▌ ✓ Phil Bryant (Republican) 66.4%; ▌Robert Gray (Democratic) 32.4%; ▌Shawn O'Hara (Reform) 1.4%

== Closest races ==
States where the margin of victory was under 10%:

1. Kentucky, 8.70%

Red denotes states won by Republicans.

== Kentucky ==
2015 Kentucky gubernatorial election
- November 3, 2015
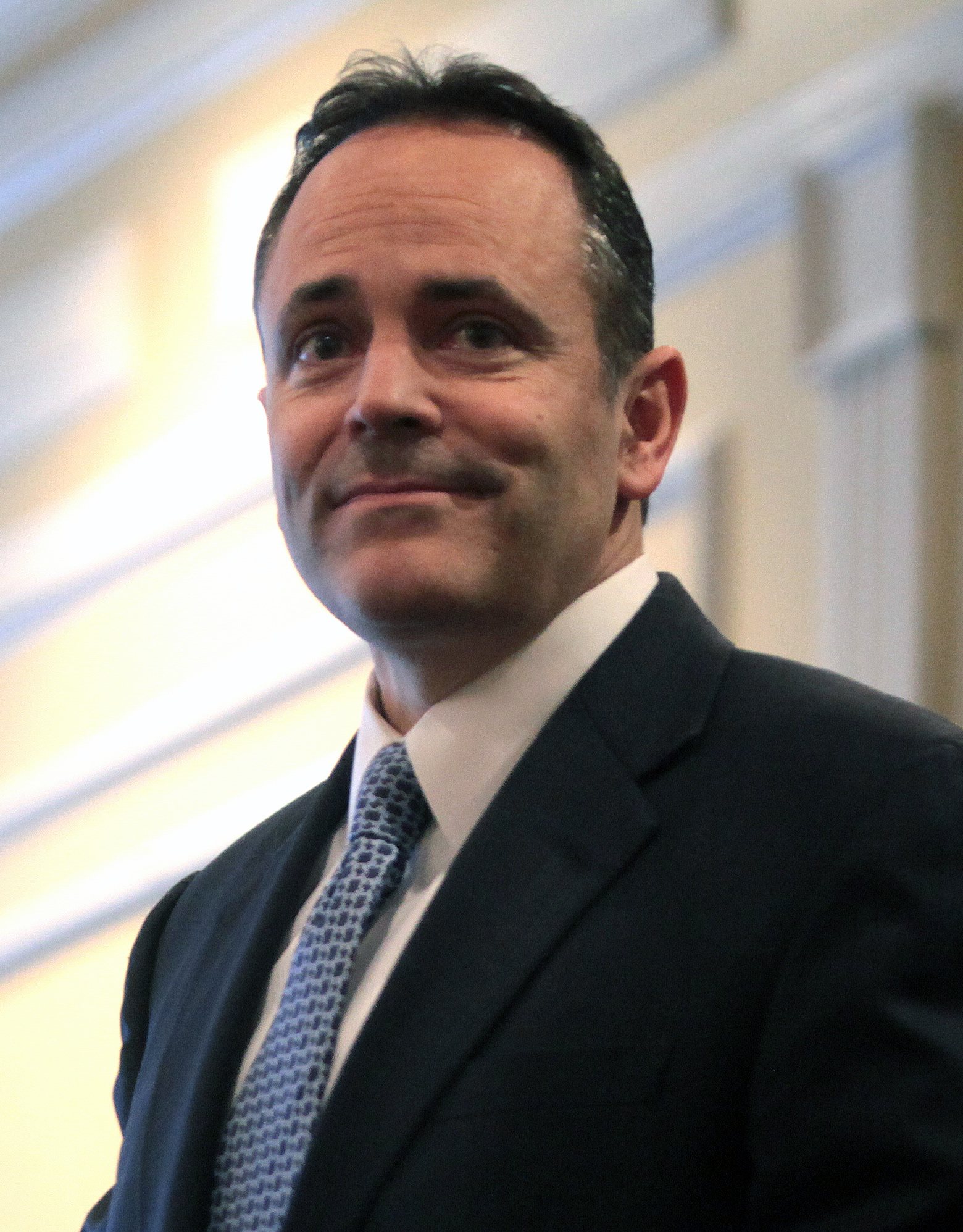

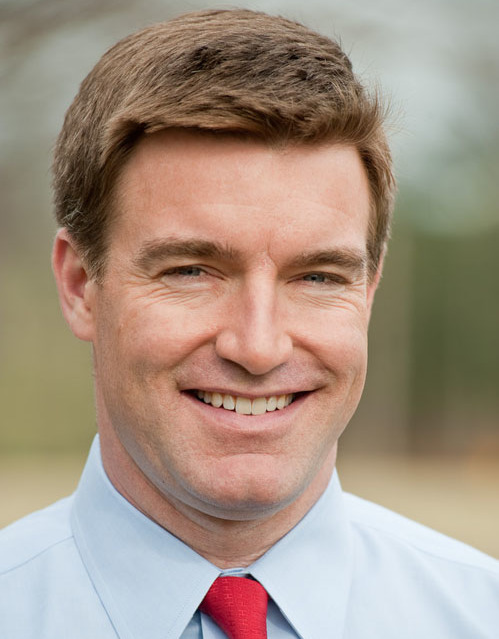
Nominee	Matt Bevin	Jack Conway
Party	Republican	Democratic
Running mate	Jenean Hampton	Sannie Overly
Popular vote	511,374	426,620
Percentage	52.5%	43.8%
- County results Bevin: 40–50% 50–60% 60–70% 70–80% 80–90% Conway: 40–50% 50–60%
Governor before election
Steve Beshear
Democratic
Elected Governor
Matt Bevin
Republican

Two-term incumbent Democratic Governor Steve Beshear, was unable to run for a third term in 2015 due to term limits established under the Kentucky Constitution. To succeed Beshear, Democrats nominated Attorney General of Kentucky Jack Conway. Conway's running mate was State Representative Sannie Overly. For the Republicans, businessman and candidate for the U.S. Senate in 2014 Matt Bevin ran on a ticket with Tea Party activist and 2014 State House candidate Jenean Hampton. Bevin narrowly defeated Agriculture Commissioner James Comer to win the Republican nomination. Drew Curtis, the founder of Fark, ran as an independent, polling well enough to appear in the Bluegrass Poll gubernatorial debate. Bevin ultimately defeated Conway, winning 53% of the vote to Conway's 44%.

Kentucky Democratic primary
Party	Candidate	Votes	%
Democratic	Jack Conway	140,627	78.78
Democratic	Geoff Young	37,887	21.22
Total votes		178,514	100.00

Kentucky Republican primary
Party	Candidate	Votes	%
Republican	Matt Bevin	70,480	32.91
Republican	James Comer	70,397	32.89
Republican	Hal Heiner	57,951	27.10
Republican	Will T. Scott	15,365	7.20
Total votes		214,187	100.00

Kentucky general election
Party	Candidate	Votes	%	±%
Republican	Matt Bevin	511,374	52.52	▲17.23
Democratic	Jack Conway	426,620	43.82	▼11.90
Independent	Drew Curtis	35,597	3.66	▼5.33
Total votes		973,692	100.00	
Republican gain from Democratic				

== Louisiana ==
2015 Louisiana gubernatorial election
- November 21, 2015
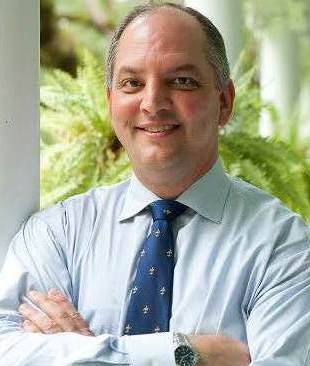

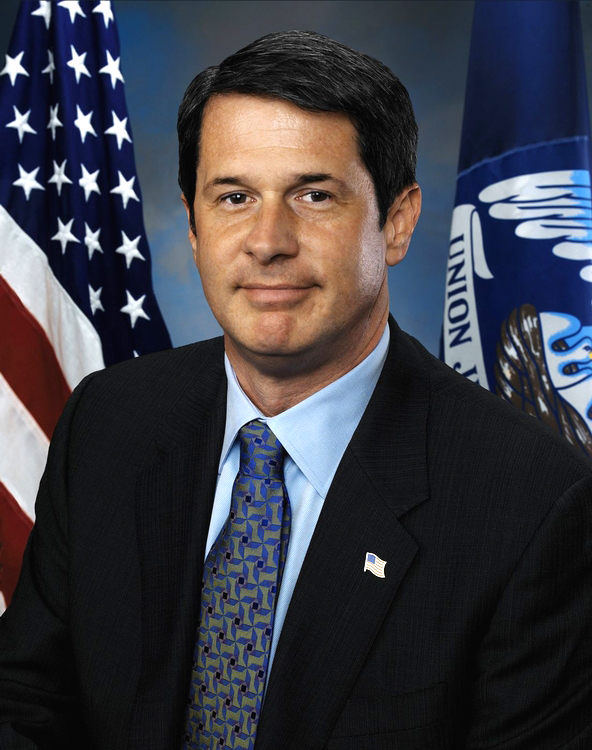
Nominee	John Bel Edwards	David Vitter
Party	Democratic	Republican
Popular vote	646,924	505,940
Percentage	56.1%	43.9%
- Parish results Edwards: 50–60% 60–70% 70–80% 80–90% Vitter: 50–60% 60–70% 70–80%
Governor before election
Bobby Jindal
Republican
Elected Governor
John Bel Edwards
Democratic

Two-term incumbent Republican Governor Bobby Jindal was term-limited in 2015 and thus unable to seek reelection. Under Louisiana's jungle primary system, all candidates, regardless of party, appear on the same ballot. The primary was held on October 24, 2015, with Democrat John Bel Edwards at 40% of the vote and Republican David Vitter at 23%. As no candidate won a majority of the vote, a runoff election between Edwards and Vitter was held on November 21, 2015. Edwards won the runoff election with 56.1% of the vote, becoming the first Democrat to win a statewide election in Louisiana since 2008.

Three Republicans ran for the office: Public Service Commissioner and former Lieutenant Governor of Louisiana Scott Angelle, incumbent Lieutenant Governor Jay Dardenne and U.S. Senator David Vitter. Potential Republican candidates included former Secretary of the Louisiana Department of Veterans Affairs and former U.S. Representative Rodney Alexander, Louisiana State Treasurer John Neely Kennedy, State Senator Gerald Long and former governor, former U.S. Representative and candidate for president in 2012 Buddy Roemer.

Three Democrats ran: 2011 candidate Cary Deaton, Minority Leader of the Louisiana House of Representatives John Bel Edwards and minister Jeremy Odom.

Louisiana jungle primary
Party	Candidate	Votes	%
Democratic	John Bel Edwards	444,517	39.89
Republican	David Vitter	256,300	23.00
Republican	Scott Angelle	214,982	19.29
Republican	Jay Dardenne	166,656	14.96
Democratic	Cary Deaton	11,763	1.06
Democratic	S. L. Simpson	7,420	0.67
Independent	Beryl Billiot	5,694	0.51
Independent	Jeremy Odom	4,756	0.43
Independent	Eric Orgeron	2,248	0.20
Total votes		1,114,336	100.00

Louisiana general election
Party	Candidate	Votes	%	±%
Democratic	John Bel Edwards	646,924	56.11	▲27.95
Republican	David Vitter	505,940	43.89	▼21.91
Total votes		1,152,864	100.00	
Democratic gain from Republican				

== Mississippi ==
2015 Mississippi gubernatorial election
- November 3, 2015
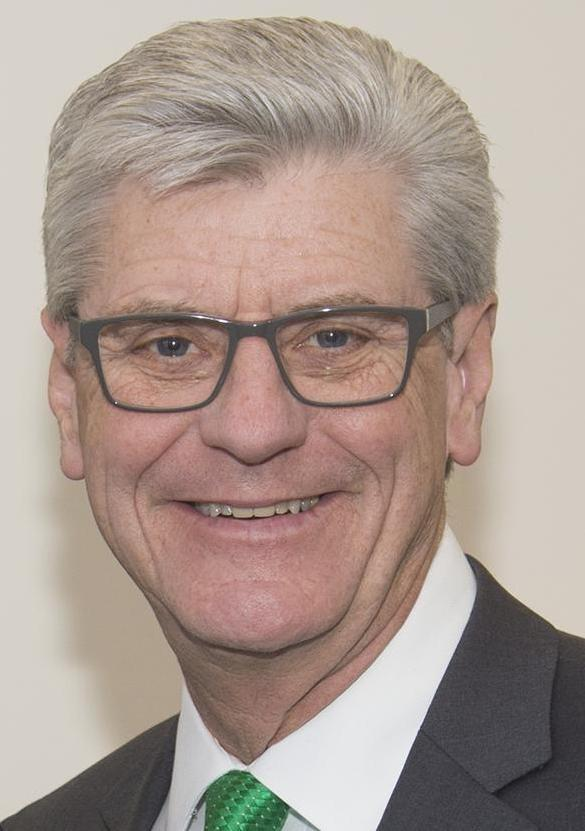

Nominee	Phil Bryant	Robert Gray
Party	Republican	Democratic
Popular vote	480,399	234,858
Percentage	66.2%	32.4%
- County results Bryant: 40-50% 50-60% 60-70% 70-80% 80-90% Gray: 40–50% 50-60% 60-70% 70-80%
Governor before election
Phil Bryant
Republican
Elected Governor
Phil Bryant
Republican

One-term incumbent Republican Governor Phil Bryant nominated for a second and final term. He had won a resounding victory over his Democratic opponent four years earlier, carrying 61% of the vote. Truck driver Robert Gray was nominated by the Democrats to oppose Bryant in the general election. Bryant won the election in a landslide, winning 67% of the vote to Gray's 32%.

Mississippi Republican primary
Party	Candidate	Votes	%
Republican	Phil Bryant (incumbent)	256,689	91.86
Republican	Mitch Young	22,738	8.14
Total votes		279,427	100.00

Mississippi Democratic primary
Party	Candidate	Votes	%
Democratic	Robert Gray	152,087	50.80
Democratic	Vicki Slater	91,104	30.43
Democratic	Valerie Short	56,177	18.77
Total votes		299,368	100.00

Mississippi general election
Party	Candidate	Votes	%	±%
Republican	Phil Bryant (incumbent)	480,399	66.24	
Democratic	Robert Gray	234,858	32.38	
Reform	Shawn O'Hara	9,950	1.37	n/a
Total votes		725,207	100.00	
Republican hold				
