= 2015 United States state legislative elections =

- November 3, 2015

7 legislative chambers 4 states
	Majority party	Minority party	Third party
Party	Republican	Democratic	Coalition
Chambers before	68	30	1 (Note: In the Washington State Senate, one Democrat caucused with Republicans to form the Majority Coalition Caucus)
Chambers after	68	30	1
Overall change	Steady	Steady	Steady
- Map of upper house elections: Republicans retained control No regularly-scheduled elections

- Map of lower house elections: Democrats retained control Republicans retained control No regularly-scheduled elections

The 2015 United States state legislative elections were held on November 3, 2015. Seven legislative chambers in four states held regularly scheduled elections. These off-year elections coincided with other state and local elections, including gubernatorial elections in three states.

Republicans maintained control of both chambers of the Louisiana, Mississippi, and Virginia legislatures, while Democrats maintained control of the New Jersey General Assembly.

== Summary table ==
Regularly scheduled elections were held in 7 of the 99 state legislative chambers in the United States. Nationwide, regularly scheduled elections were held for 538 of the 7,383 legislative seats. This table only covers regularly scheduled elections; additional special elections took place concurrently with these regularly scheduled elections.

State	Upper House				Lower House			
State	Seats up	Total	% up	Term	Seats up	Total	% up	Term
Louisiana	39	39	100	4	105	105	100	4
Mississippi	52	52	100	4	122	122	100	4
New Jersey	0	40	0	2/4 (Note: The upper houses of Arkansas, Delaware, Florida, Hawaii, Illinois, Minnesota, New Jersey, and Texas use a 2-4-4 term length system.)	80	80	100	2
Virginia	40	40	100	4	100	100	100	2

== State summaries ==
=== Louisiana ===
All seats of the Louisiana State Senate and the Louisiana House of Representatives were up for election to four-year terms in single-member districts. Republicans retained majority control in both chambers.

Louisiana State Senate
Party	Leader	Before	After	Change
Republican	John Alario	26	25	▼1
Democratic	Eric LaFleur	14	12	▲1
Total		39	39	

Louisiana House of Representatives
Party	Leader	Before	After	Change
Republican	Chuck Kleckley	58	61	▲3
Democratic	Gene Reynolds	43	42	▼1
Independent		2	2	Steady
Total		105	105	

=== Mississippi ===
All seats of the Mississippi State Senate and the Mississippi House of Representatives were up for election to four-year terms in single-member districts. Republicans retained majority control in both chambers.

Mississippi State Senate
Party	Leader	Before	After	Change
Republican	Giles Ward	32	32	Steady
Democratic	Steve Hale	20	20	Steady
Total		52	52	

Mississippi House of Representatives
Party	Leader	Before	After	Change
Republican	Philip Gunn	67	73	▲6
Democratic	Robert Moak	54	49	▼5
Total		122	122	

=== New Jersey ===
All seats of the New Jersey General Assembly were up for election to two-year terms in coterminous two-member districts. The New Jersey Senate did not hold regularly scheduled elections. Democrats maintained majority control in the lower house.

New Jersey General Assembly
Party	Leader	Before	After	Change
Democratic	Vincent Prieto	48	52	▲4
Republican	Jon Bramnick	32	28	▼4
Total		80	80	

=== Virginia ===
All seats of the Senate of Virginia and the Virginia House of Delegates were up for election in single-member districts. Senators were elected to four-year terms, while delegates serve terms of two years. Republicans maintained control of both legislative chambers.

Senate of Virginia
Party	Leader	Before	After	Change
Republican	Tommy Norment	21	21	Steady
Democratic	Dick Saslaw	19	19	Steady
Total		40	40	

Virginia House of Delegates
Party	Leader	Before	After	Change
Republican	William J. Howell	67	66	▼1
Democratic	David Toscano	33	34	▲1
Total		100	100	

== Special elections ==
=== New Jersey ===
District		Incumbent			This race	
Chamber	No.	Representative	Party	First elected	Results	Candidates
Senate	5	Nilsa Cruz-Perez	Democratic	2014 (appointed)	Incumbent appointed December 15, 2014, upon resignation of predecessor. Incumbent elected to finish term November 3, 2015. Democratic hold.	▌ ✓ Nilsa Cruz-Perez (Democratic) 98.5%; ▌ Write-ins 1.5%

== See also ==
- 2015 United States gubernatorial elections
