= Jenean Hampton =

American politician (born 1958)

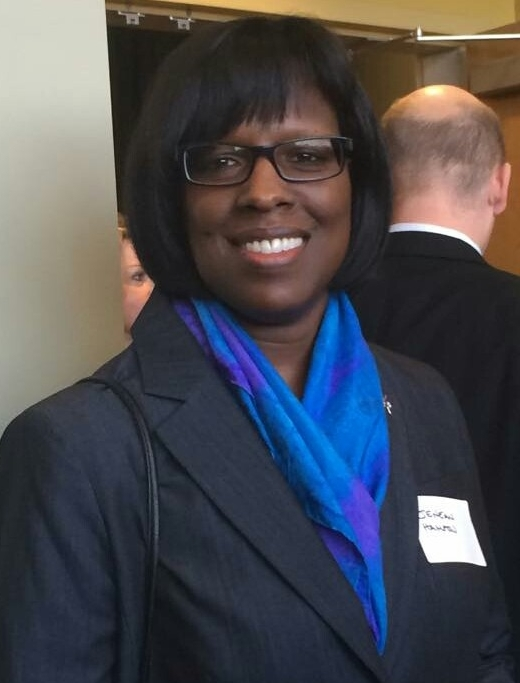
- Hampton in 2015

57th Lieutenant Governor of Kentucky
- In office December 8, 2015 – December 10, 2019
- Governor: Matt Bevin
- Preceded by: Crit Luallen
- Succeeded by: Jacqueline Coleman

Personal details
- Born: Jenean Michelle Hampton; May 12, 1958 (age 68) Detroit, Michigan, U.S.
- Party: Republican
- Spouse: Doyle Isaak (m. 2001)
- Education: Wayne State University (BS); University of Rochester (MBA)

Military service
- Allegiance: United States
- Branch/service: United States Air Force
- Years of service: 1985–1992
- Rank: Captain

Jenean Michelle Hampton (born May 12, 1958) is an American politician who served as the 57th lieutenant governor of Kentucky from 2015 to 2019. Hampton was the running mate of gubernatorial candidate Matt Bevin in the 2015 election. A Republican, Hampton was the first African American to hold statewide office in Kentucky history and the third African-American woman to have served as lieutenant governor of a U.S. state.

== Early life and education ==
Jenean Michelle Hampton was born on May 12, 1958 and raised in Detroit, Michigan, one of four daughters born to Donald and Marie Hampton. Her parents divorced when she was seven years old, leaving her mother to raise Hampton and her sisters on her own. Hampton's mother struggled because she lacked a high school diploma. After Hampton graduated from high school, she worked for five years in the automotive industry in order to help pay for her college education. She earned an Industrial Engineering degree from Wayne State University in 1985. She later earned a Master of Business Administration degree from the University of Rochester.

== Military and business career ==
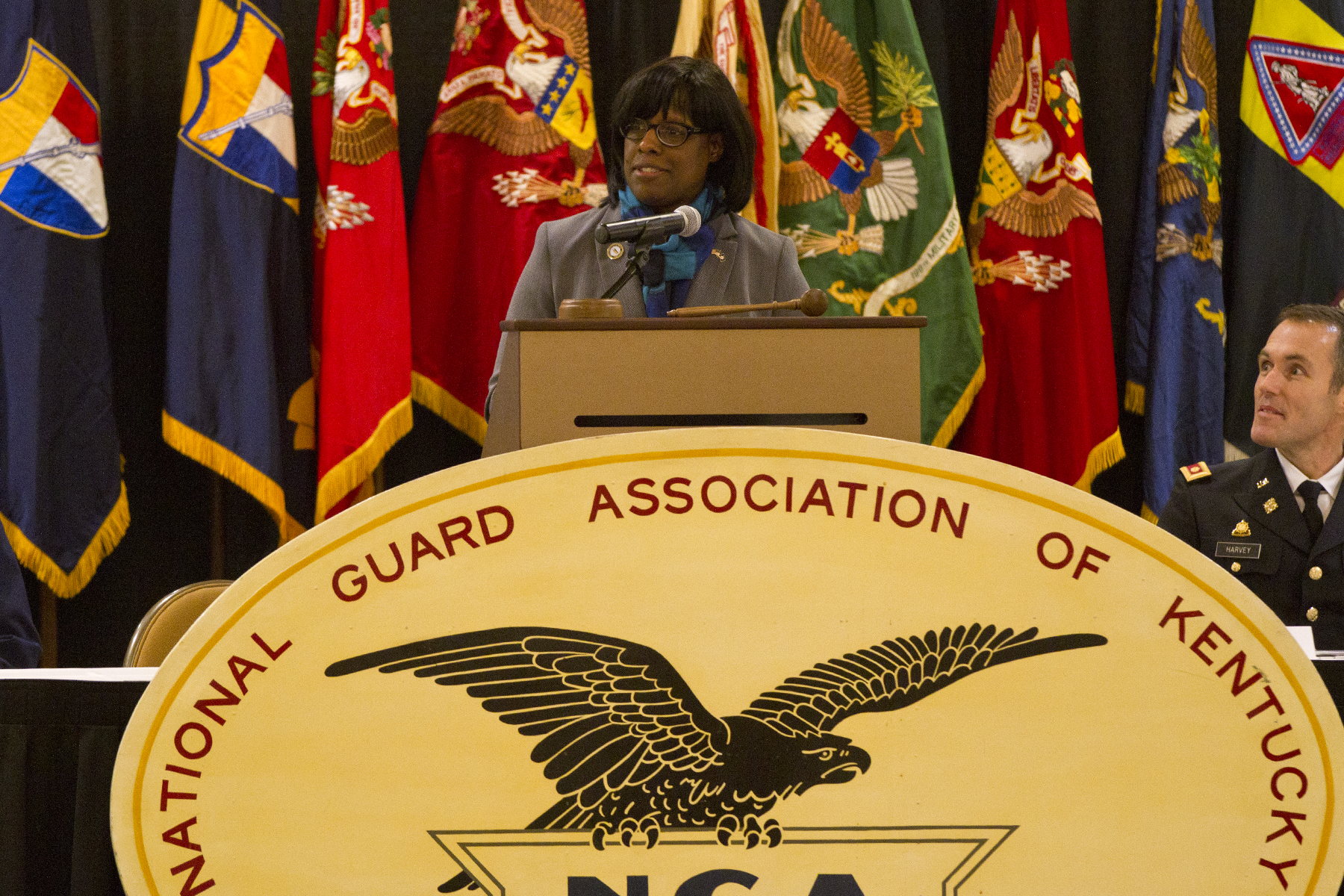
Hampton speaking to members of the Kentucky National Guard in February 2016

Hampton served in the United States Air Force for seven years as a computer systems officer, eventually attaining the rank of Captain. During Operation Desert Storm, she was deployed to Saudi Arabia. While stationed in Saudi Arabia, Hampton was responsible for radar software used in tracking enemy planes and in search and rescue missions.

Hampton spent 19 years working in the corrugated packaging industry, eventually reaching the position of plant manager.

== Political career ==
A Republican, Hampton first sought political office in 2014. That year, she unsuccessfully challenged State Representative Jody Richards. Hampton has been active in her local party and in the Tea Party Movement.

Hampton was selected by Matt Bevin as his running mate for Governor of Kentucky in 2015. On November 3, 2015, Bevin and Hampton defeated the Democratic ticket of Attorney General Jack Conway and State Representative Sannie Overly in the 2015 Kentucky gubernatorial election. Bevin and Hampton were sworn in to their respective posts on December 8, 2015. Hampton was the first African American to hold statewide office in Kentucky history and the third black woman to serve as lieutenant governor of a U.S. state. She was the 57th Lieutenant Governor of Kentucky.

Bevin did not select Hampton as his running mate in his 2019 re-election bid. Her term expired in December 2019. After Bevin lost the general election, Hampton stated that she had voted for Libertarian nominee John Hicks instead of Bevin.

== Personal life ==
Hampton lives in Bowling Green, Kentucky. She is married to Colonel Dr. Doyle Isaak, a retired U.S. Air Force officer.

She is a licensed amateur radio operator.

Hampton is also a member of the Civil Air Patrol, holding the grade of lieutenant colonel.

== See also ==
- List of African-American Republicans
- List of female lieutenant governors in the United States
- List of minority governors and lieutenant governors in the United States

Party political offices
Preceded by Richie Farmer	Republican nominee for Lieutenant Governor of Kentucky; 2015	Succeeded by Ralph Alvarado
Political offices
Preceded by Crit Luallen	Lieutenant Governor of Kentucky; 2015–2019	Succeeded by Jacqueline Coleman
