= 2010 United States Senate election in Kentucky =

- November 2, 2010
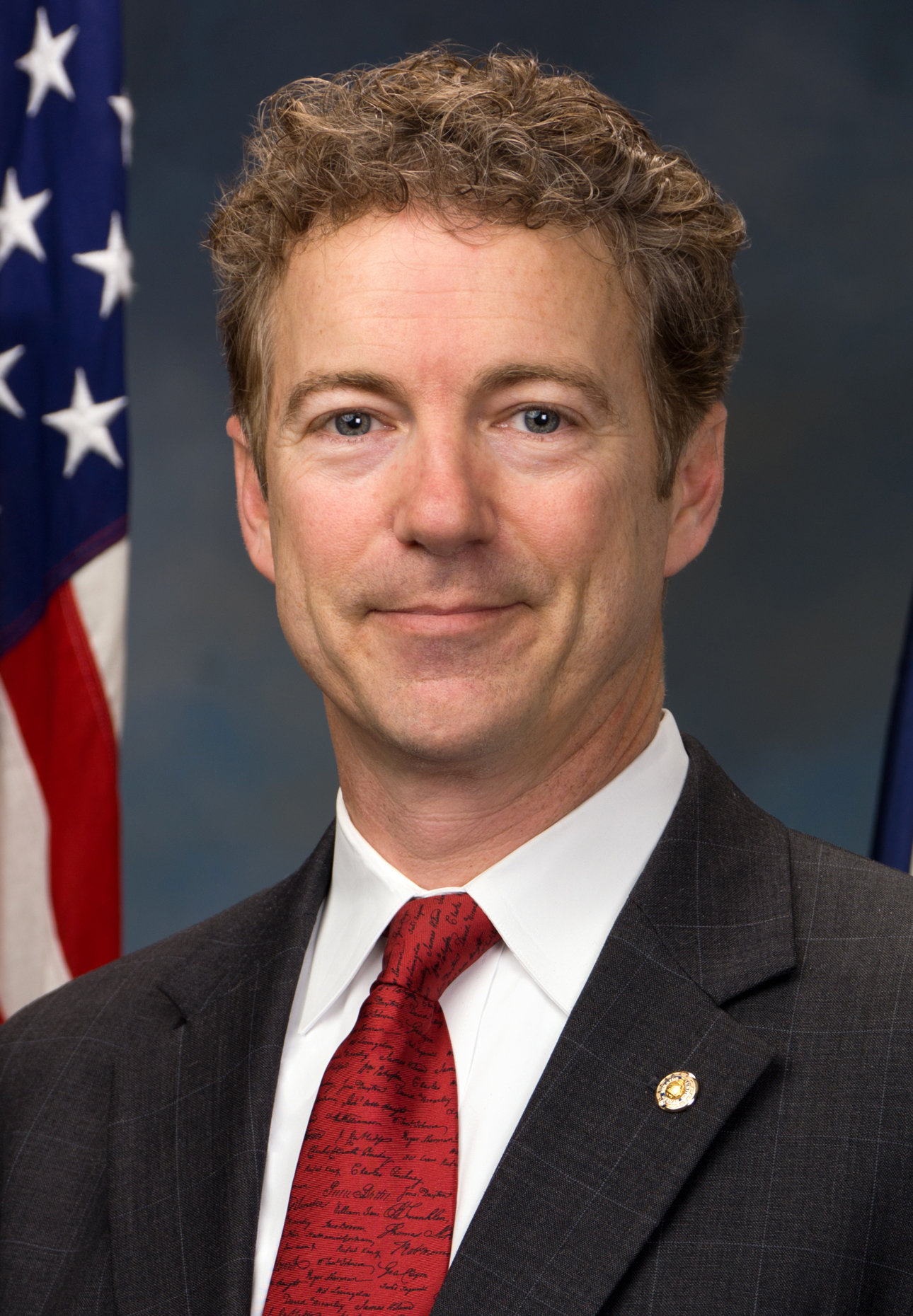

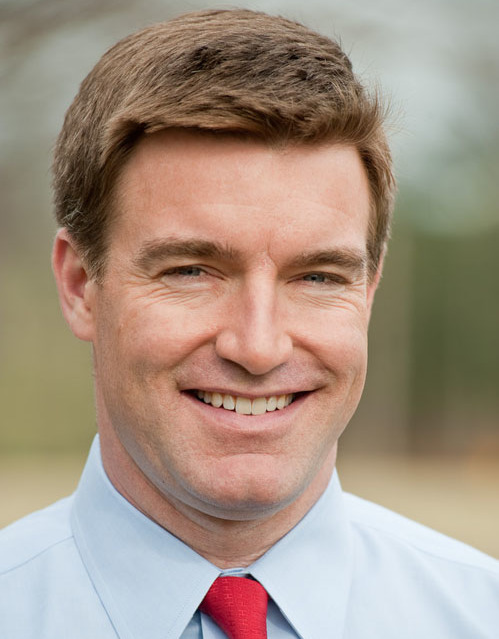
Nominee	Rand Paul	Jack Conway
Party	Republican	Democratic
Popular vote	755,706	600,052
Percentage	55.73%	44.25%
- County results Paul: 50–60% 60–70% 70–80% Conway: 50–60% 60–70% Tie: 50%
U.S. senator before election
Jim Bunning
Republican
Elected U.S. Senator
Rand Paul
Republican

The 2010 United States Senate election in Kentucky took place on November 2, 2010, alongside other elections to the United States Senate in other states as well as elections to the United States House of Representatives and various state and local elections. Primaries for each respective party were held on May 18, 2010. Incumbent Republican U.S. Senator Jim Bunning decided to retire instead of seeking a third term. Republican nominee Rand Paul, an ophthalmologist and son of Congressman Ron Paul, won the open seat against Kentucky Attorney General Jack Conway.

== Background ==
In early 2009, incumbent Republican U.S. Senator Jim Bunning, who won reelection by a surprisingly narrow margin in 2004, said he would need to raise $10 million for his re-election campaign. However, NRSC chairman John Cornyn pressured Bunning to retire due to concerns that he could lose a reelection bid. In July 2009, Bunning announced he would not run for re-election.

In February 2009, Senator Bunning stated that another justice could soon be appointed to the United States Supreme Court because Associate Justice Ruth Bader Ginsburg, who had been diagnosed with pancreatic cancer, would be dead within nine months, creating a significant amount of controversy, which resulted in an apology from Bunning. Ginsburg would not die until 2020—outliving Bunning, who would die in 2017.

In late May 2009, Bunning called fellow Kentucky Senator and Republican Minority Leader Mitch McConnell a "control freak" and suggested that he did not need McConnell's endorsement. He also challenged Lexington Herald-Leader editor John Stamper to an arm wrestling match after Stamper questioned whether Bunning was "fit to serve."

Additionally, Bunning created further controversy in February 2010 when he objected to a proposal of unanimous consent for an extension of unemployment insurance, COBRA, and other federal programs, citing that this extension was not pay-as-you-go. He proposed an amendment which sought to find the funds to pay for the bill from the Stimulus Bill of 2009, and declared that he supported the unemployed, but that a bill such as this only added to the growing deficit and that it should be paid for immediately. Senator Bob Corker joined Bunning, while other senators worked to cease his objections. When Senator Jeff Merkley urged him to drop his objections to vote on a 30-day extension of benefits, Bunning responded "tough shit." Bunning finally agreed to end his objection to the bill in exchange for a vote on his amendment to pay for the package. It failed 53–43 on a procedural vote. The extension of unemployment benefits then passed by a vote of 78–19.

== Republican primary ==
=== Candidates ===
- Rand Paul, ophthalmologist
- Trey Grayson, Secretary of State of Kentucky
- Gurley L. Martin, World War II veteran
- Jon J. Scribner, businessman
- John Stephenson, former Kentucky Superintendent of Public Education

=== Campaign ===
On August 20, 2009, a grassroots-planned moneybomb raised $433,509 for Rand Paul's campaign in a 24-hour period. According to Paul, this set a new record in Kentucky's political fundraising history (for a 24-hour period). Republican Liberty Caucus endorsed Paul in November 2009. On December 22, 2009, Rand Paul picked up the endorsement of Concerned Women for America. Paul embraced the Tea Party movement, and promoted "small government principles" one day after he officially entered the race for Kentucky's open seat. Paul ran a strong anti-Washington message. One commercial tied Grayson as part of the problem, noting that Grayson raised money with AIG executives in Washington. In another advertisement, Paul had also attacked Grayson as a career politician and a liar.

Grayson created a new website (randpaulstrangeideas.com) that attacked Paul for his "strange ideas," such as his opposition of the PATRIOT Act, and what Grayson alleged to be his support of closing down Guantanamo Bay and saying that Iran was not a threat. He also attacked Paul for being a Duke University fan. He sent out another TV ad and web video that stirred controversy by making the case that Paul believes that foreign policy decisions made prior to September 11, 2001, are partially to blame for the attacks. Paul immediately responded by launching a statewide television ad in which he expresses his "outrage at terrorists who killed 3,000 innocents" before accusing Grayson of a "lie" and a "shameful" tactic. Grayson accused the Fox News Channel of favoring Paul over him.

On May 18, 2010, Paul won the Republican nomination. After conceding the election to Paul, Grayson said, "It's time to put all differences aside, unite behind Dr. Paul, he needs our help and I for one stand ready to serve".

=== Endorsements ===
Rand Paul
- U.S. Senator Jim Bunning of Kentucky
- U.S. Senator Jim DeMint of South Carolina
- Former Governor Sarah Palin of Alaska
- Former Governor Mike Huckabee of Arkansas
- Congressman Ron Paul (father of Rand)
- Former Republican presidential candidate and editor-in-chief of Forbes Steve Forbes
- State Senator Dan Seum
- Editor of conservative weblog RedState Erick Erickson
- James Dobson, founder of Focus on the Family
- Cathy Bailey, Former U.S. Ambassador to Latvia
- Brooks Wicker, 3rd congressional district candidate
- James Edwards, host of The Political Cesspool
- Concerned Women for America
- Downsize DC Foundation
- Americans For Prosperity
- FreedomWorks
- Gun Owners of America
- Republican Liberty Caucus
- Northern Kentucky Right to Life
- Tea Party Express
- REAGAN PAC
- Bluegrass Bulletin's Marcus Carey
- Kentucky Credit Union PAC
- Lexington Herald-Leader
- Club for Growth
Trey Grayson
- U.S. Senate Republican Minority Leader Mitch McConnell of Kentucky
- Former Vice President Dick Cheney
- Former U.S. Senator Rick Santorum of Pennsylvania
- Former Congressman Ron Lewis of Kentucky
- Former New York City Mayor Rudy Giuliani
- Congressman Hal Rogers of Kentucky
- State Senator Julie Denton
- State Senator Tom Jensen
- State Senator Vernie McGaha
- State Senator John Schickel
- State Senator Brandon Smith
- State Senator Elizabeth Tori
- State Senator Jack Westwood
- State Senator Ken Winters
- State Representative Scott Brinkman
- State Representative John "Bam" Carney
- State Representative Tim Couch
- State Representative Ronald Crimm
- State Representative Bob Deweese
- State Representative Myron Dossett
- State Representative Bill Farmer
- State Representative Mike Harmon
- State Representative Brent Housman
- State Representative Adam Koenig
- State Representative Brad Montell
- State Representative Tim Moore
- State Representative David Osborne
- State Representative Marie Rader
- State Representative Steven Rudy
- State Representative Sal Santoro
- State Representative Alecia Webb-Edgington
- State Representative Addia Wuchner
- State Representative Jill York
- Kentucky Right to Life
- The Kentucky Enquirer

=== Polling ===
List of Republican primary polling numbers

Poll source	Date(s) administered	Sample size	Margin of error	Trey Grayson	Rand Paul	Other	Undecided
Survey USA	August 15–17, 2009	516	± 4.4%	37%	26%	13%	17%
Research 2000	August 31 – September 2, 2009	600	± 4.0%	40%	25%	18%	17%
Survey USA	October 30 – November 2, 2009	448	± 4.7%	32%	35%	10%	18%
Public Policy Polling	December 18–21, 2009	478	± 4.5%	25%	44%	—	32%
Magellan Strategies	February 18, 2010	560	± 4.1%	23%	44%	—	33%
Survey USA	March 1–3, 2010	454	± 4.7%	27%	42%	11%	19%
Research 2000	March 15–17, 2010	600	± 5.0%	28%	40%	14%	18%
Survey USA	April 9–11, 2010	446	± 4.7%	30%	45%	5%	19%
Public Policy Polling	May 1–2, 2010	363	± 5.1%	28%	46%	4%	21%
Research 2000	May 2–4, 2010	500	± 4.5%	32%	44%	7%	17%
Magellan Strategies	May 4, 2010	611	± 3.9%	28%	43%	8%	21%
Survey USA	May 9–11, 2010	440	± 4.8%	33%	49%	7%	11%
Research 2000	May 10–12, 2010	600	± 4.0%	35%	45%	7%	13%
Public Policy Polling	May 15–16, 2010	1,065	± 3.0%	34%	52%	7%	7%
Magellan Strategies	May 16, 2010	809	± 3.4%	30%	55%	8%	7%

=== Results ===
Republican primary results by county: Paul: 50–60%; 60–70%; 70–80%; Grayson: 40–50%; 50–60%

Republican primary results
Party	Candidate	Votes	%
Republican	Rand Paul	206,986	58.8%
Republican	Trey Grayson	124,864	35.4%
Republican	Bill Johnson*	7,861	2.2%
Republican	John Stephenson	6,885	2.0%
Republican	Gurley L. Martin	2,850	0.8%
Republican	Jon J. Scribner	2,829	0.8%
Total votes		352,275	100.0%

*Though Bill Johnson dropped out of the race prior to the primary, he still appeared on the ballot.

== Democratic primary ==
=== Candidates ===
- Jack Conway, Attorney General of Kentucky
- Daniel Mongiardo, Lieutenant Governor of Kentucky and nominee in 2004
- James Buckmaster, physician
- Darlene Fitzgerald Price, former U.S. Customs agent
- Maurice Sweeney, businessman

=== Campaign ===
Mongiardo announced that he had received the endorsement of Governor Steve Beshear and raised $420,000.

Due to Conway's large margin of victory in his statewide campaign for attorney general, his fundraising ability, and the age difference between Conway and Bunning, Conway was described as a viable candidate.

Both candidates were against the Senate version of the Affordable Care Act. When Mongiardo said that "it was time to start over," he was criticized by Conway and labeled "Dr. No." Both candidates supported the final version. Attorney General Conway refused to join a lawsuit claiming that health care reform is unconstitutional.

On May 18, 2010, Conway won the Democratic nomination.

=== Endorsements ===
Jack Conway
- U.S. Congressmen Ben Chandler
- U.S. Congressman John Yarmuth
- Speaker of the Kentucky House of Representatives Greg Stumbo
- Kentucky Finance/Administration Cabinet Secretary Jonathan Miller
- Louisville Mayor Jerry Abramson
- Former U.S. Senator and former Governor of Kentucky Wendell Ford
- Former Governor of Kentucky John Brown
- Kentucky State Auditor Crit Luallen
- The Courier-Journal
- The Kentucky Enquirer
- Lexington Herald-Leader
Daniel Mongiardo
- Governor Steve Beshear
- State Senator and former Governor Julian Carroll
- State Senator Perry Clark
- State Senator Denise Harper-Angel
- State Senator Walter Blevins
- State Senator Tim Shaughnessy
- State Senator Gerald Neal
- Former State Senator David Karem

=== Polling ===
List of Democratic primary polling numbers

Poll source	Date(s) administered	Sample size	Margin of error	Jack Conway	Daniel Mongiardo	Other	Undecided
Garin-Hart-Yang	May 12–13, 2009	336	± 5.3%	28%	43%	—	29%
Survey USA	August 15–17, 2009	647	± 3.9%	31%	39%	9%	14%
Research 2000	August 31 – September 2, 2009	600	± 4.0%	30%	37%	15%	18%
Survey USA	October 30 – November 2, 2009	602	± 4.1%	28%	39%	10%	16%
Public Policy Polling	December 22, 2009	557	± 4.2%	37%	33%	—	30%
Survey USA	March 1–3, 2010	590	± 4.1%	27%	45%	9%	19%
Research 2000	March 15–17, 2010	600	± 5.0%	31%	47%	8%	14%
Survey USA	April 9–11, 2010	659	± 4.7%	32%	35%	11%	21%
Public Policy Polling	May 1–2, 2010	459	± 4.6%	27%	36%	10%	27%
Research 2000	May 2–4, 2010	500	± 4.5%	32%	39%	12%	17%
Survey USA	May 9–11, 2010	662	± 3.9%	37%	38%	13%	12%
Research 2000	May 10–12, 2010	600	± 4.0%	36%	39%	10%	15%

=== Results ===
The primary race was extremely close with Conway narrowly prevailing by just over 4,000 votes. The race remained in doubt for much of the night. Finally with 99% of the vote counted the Associated Press declared Conway the winner. Mongiardo called Conway to concede at 10:08 P.M. EST. Mongiardo congratulated Conway and pledged him his full support for the general election. In terms of the breakdown of the results, Conway ran up margins in Jefferson County home of Louisville, and Fayette County home of Lexington. In terms of more rural counties Mongiardo and Conway split the vote. Conway performed well in central Kentucky, while Mongiardo performed well in coal country in east Kentucky and farm country in western Kentucky. In the end Conway's performance in the states most populated county, Jefferson County proved to be just enough to carry him to victory. The primary race was also notable because both Conway and Mongiardo received more votes than Republican Rand Paul.

Democratic primary results by county: Conway: 30–40%; 40–50%; 50–60%; 60–70%; Mongiardo: 30–40%; 40–50%; 50–60%; 60–70%; 70–80%; Price: 40–50%; Buckmaster: 30–40%

Democratic primary results
Party	Candidate	Votes	%
Democratic	Jack Conway	229,433	44.0%
Democratic	Daniel Mongiardo	225,260	43.2%
Democratic	Darlene Fitzgerald Price	28,531	5.5%
Democratic	James Buckmaster	20,561	3.9%
Democratic	Maurice Sweeney	17,874	3.4%
Total votes		521,659	100.0%

== General election ==
=== Candidates ===
- Rand Paul (R), ophthalmologist and political activist
- Jack Conway (D), Attorney General
- Billy Ray Wilson (independent write-in)

Kentucky's ballot access requirements allow Republicans and Democrats to run for office with two signatures, but require minor parties and independents to collect at least 5,000 signatures. The filing deadline for minor party and independent candidates was on August 10, and no candidate filed.

Some speculate that the reason why no minor party or independent candidate filed is because Paul's candidacy helped discourage it. The Libertarian Party of Kentucky held its nominating convention for 2010 elections and failed to nominate a candidate for the U.S. Senate, as no one stepped forward to seek nomination to that office. Despite comments from some observers that Paul espouses libertarian beliefs, the Kentucky Libertarian Party issued an official press release stating "Rand Paul is not a libertarian" and detailing the differences between Paul's beliefs and libertarian principles. Similarly, the Constitution Party of Kentucky avoided the Senate race ostensibly because of Rand Paul's presence in that race and perhaps because of his more minarchist stance than Trey Grayson, especially if the latter had been the nominee.

Billy Ray Wilson, an independent of London, filed as a write-in candidate.

=== Campaign ===
Conway began the race trailing Paul, but as he attacked his opponent's positions on social-welfare and criminal-justice policies, the polls began to tighten. Conway agreed to run an advertisement that linked Paul's policy stances to a college prank in which Paul reportedly demanded that a female classmate worship a bong named "Aqua Buddha." Independent political analysts in Kentucky quickly warned that Conway would regret his decision. The ad's focus on religion led critics, including not just Republicans but also some liberals such as Hardball's Chris Matthews, to charge that Conway was improperly questioning Paul's faith, to which Conway countered that the ad was intended to question Paul's "judgment." Nonetheless, Conway swiftly dropped again in the polls, a decline from which he never recovered. Conway ceased his defense of the commercial after the election, admitting that running it had been a mistake; he claimed that he had done so only reluctantly at the urging of national advisers despite finding it "harsh as mule's breath."

Conway saw one last opportunity before his final debate with Paul. One of Rand Paul's supporters stomped on a MoveOn activist after she approached Paul's vehicle, and a video of the event was later used in a Conway TV commercial. Paul and Conway condemned the attack and the supporter was banned from campaign events.

The campaign attracted $8.5 million in contributions from outside groups, of which $6 million was spent to help Rand Paul and $2.5 million to help Conway. This money influx was in addition to the money spent by the candidates themselves: $6 million by Paul and $4.7 million by Conway.

Paul was endorsed by The Kentucky Enquirer, The Richmond Register, and the Bowling Green Daily News; as well as by the National Federation of Independent Business, Council for Citizens Against Government Waste, National Right to Life, US Chamber of Commerce, National Vietnam and Gulf War Veterans Coalition, Mike Huckabee, and Tony Perkins/FRC Action PAC.

Conway was endorsed by the Courier-Journal and the Lexington Herald Leader.

=== Debates ===
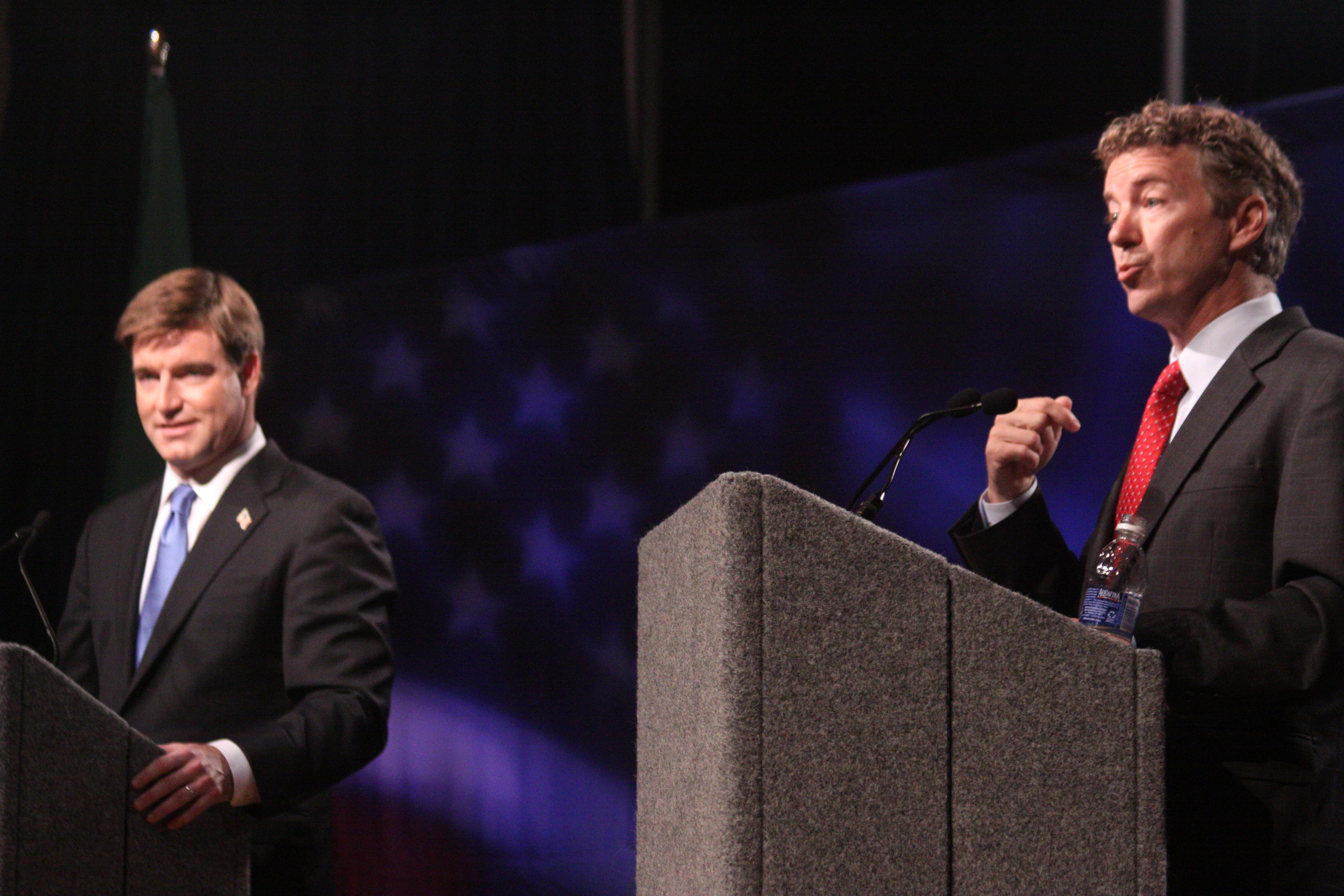
Rand Paul and Jack Conway debate, October 2010

There were 5 televised debates between the two candidates. The first debate on October 3, 2010, which was moderated by Chris Wallace, seemed to focus on President Obama's decisions during his 2 years as president. Paul stated, "I think his agenda is wrong for America. I will stand up against President Obama's agenda." Conway responded, "I am a proud Democrat. I'm certainly not going to be on the left of Barack Obama." At the time of the debate, the election's polls indicated the race was a dead heat.

2010 United States Senate election in Kentucky
No.	Date	Host	Moderator	Link	Participants	
P Participant A Absent N Non-invitee I Invitee W Withdrawn						
P Participant A Absent N Non-invitee I Invitee W Withdrawn					Rand Paul	Jack Conway
1	May 18, 2010	????	????		P	P
2	October 11, 2010	????	????		P	P
3	October 17, 2010	????	????		P	P
4	October 25, 2010	????	????		P	P

=== Predictions ===
Source	Ranking	As of
Cook Political Report	Lean R	November 1, 2010
Rothenberg	Lean R	October 29, 2010
RealClearPolitics	Lean R	October 19, 2010
Sabato's Crystal Ball	Lean R	October 14, 2010
CQ Politics	Lean R	October 20, 2010
Rasmussen Reports	Safe R	October 29, 2010
The New York Times	Lean R	October 20, 2010

=== Fundraising ===
Candidate (party)	Receipts	Disbursements	Cash on hand	Debt
Rand Paul (R)	$6,727,033	$6,068,547	$658,484	$0
Jack Conway (D)	$5,027,318	$4,370,349	$684,177	$460,794
Source: Federal Election Commission

=== Polling ===
Poll source	Date(s) administered	Sample size	Margin of error	Rand Paul (R)	Jack Conway (D)	Other	Undecided
SurveyUSA	August 15–17, 2009	1,944	± 2.3%	38%	43%	—	19%
Research 2000	August 31 – September 2, 2009	600	± 4.0%	37%	41%	—	22%
Rasmussen Reports	September 30, 2009	500	± 4.5%	38%	42%	4%	15%
SurveyUSA	October 30 – November 2, 2009	1,770	± 2.4%	39%	44%	—	17%
Public Policy Polling	December 18–21, 2009	1,199	± 2.8%	42%	36%	—	22%
Rasmussen Reports	January 6, 2010	500	± 4.5%	46%	38%	4%	12%
Rasmussen Reports	February 2, 2010	500	± 4.5%	47%	39%	3%	11%
Rasmussen Reports	March 2, 2010	500	± 4.5%	49%	34%	4%	13%
Research 2000	March 15–17, 2010	600	± 5.0%	45%	39%	—	16%
Rasmussen Reports	March 31, 2010	500	± 4.5%	50%	36%	3%	11%
Rasmussen Reports	April 28, 2010	500	± 4.5%	47%	38%	4%	10%
Public Policy Polling	May 1–2, 2010	946	± 3.2%	41%	40%	—	19%
Research 2000	May 10–12, 2010	600	± 4.0%	42%	39%	—	19%
Rasmussen Reports	May 19, 2010	500	± 4.5%	59%	34%	4%	3%
Research 2000	May 24–26, 2010	600	± 4.0%	44%	41%	—	9%
SurveyUSA	May 25–27, 2010	569	± 4.2%	51%	45%	—	4%
Rasmussen Reports	June 1, 2010	500	± 4.5%	49%	41%	4%	6%
Rasmussen Reports	June 28, 2010	500	± 4.5%	49%	42%	3%	6%
Public Policy Polling	June 28–30, 2010	625	± 3.9%	43%	43%	—	14%
Rasmussen Reports	July 20, 2010	750	± 4.0%	49%	41%	4%	6%
SurveyUSA	July 27–29, 2010	568	± 4.2%	51%	43%	—	5%
Reuters/Ipsos	August 13–15, 2010	435	± 4.7%	45%	40%	—	15%
Rasmussen Reports	August 17, 2010	500	± 4.5%	49%	40%	4%	7%
SurveyUSA	August 30 – September 1, 2010	561	± 4.2%	55%	40%	—	5%
Opinion Research	September 2–7, 2010	869	± 3.5%	46%	46%	5%	4%
Rasmussen Reports	September 7, 2010	500	± 4.5%	54%	39%	2%	4%
Public Policy Polling	September 11–12, 2010	959	± 3.2%	49%	42%	—	9%
SurveyUSA	September 21–23, 2010	611	± 4.0%	49%	47%	—	4%
Rasmussen Reports	September 29, 2010	500	± 4.0%	49%	38%	5%	8%
Rasmussen Reports	October 18, 2010	500	± 4.5%	47%	42%	4%	7%
Mason-Dixon	October 18–19, 2010	625	± 4.0%	48%	43%	—	9%
Rasmussen Reports	October 23, 2010	1,000	± 3.0%	50%	43%	2%	5%
Public Policy Polling	October 21–24, 2010	900	± 3.3%	53%	40%	—	7%
Opinion Research	October 20–26, 2010	785	± 3.5%	50%	43%	—	—
SurveyUSA	October 24–27, 2010	900	± 4.0%	52%	43%	—	4%
Rasmussen Reports	October 27, 2010	750	± 4.0%	53%	41%	2%	4%
Public Policy Polling	October 28–30, 2010	1,021	± 3.1%	55%	40%	—	5%

=== Results ===
United States Senate election in Kentucky, 2010
Party	Candidate	Votes	%	±%
Republican	Rand Paul	755,706	55.73%	+5.07%
Democratic	Jack Conway	600,052	44.25%	−5.09%
Independent	Billy Ray Wilson (write-in)	338	0.02%	N/A
Total votes		1,356,096	100.0%	
Republican hold				

==== Counties that flipped from Democratic to Republican ====
- Bell (Largest city: Middlesboro)
- Bourbon (Largest city: Paris)
- Caldwell (Largest city: Princeton)
- Calloway (Largest city: Murray)
- Carlisle (Largest city: Bardwell)
- Clark (Largest city: Winchester)
- Gallatin (Largest city: Warsaw)
- Graves (Largest city: Mayfield)
- Greenup (Largest city: Flatwoods)
- Harrison (Largest city: Cynthiana)
- Henry (Largest city: Eminence)
- Hickman (Largest city: Clinton)
- Livingston (Largest city: Salem)
- Lyon (Largest city: Eddyville)
- Marshall (Largest city: Benton)
- Morgan (Largest city: West Liberty)
- Nelson (Largest city: Bardstown)
- Bath (Largest city: Owingsville)
- Union (Largest city: Morganfield)
- Webster (Largest city: Providence)
- Robertson (largest municipality: Mount Olivet) (became tied)
- Ballard (Largest city: LaCenter)
- Fulton (Largest city: Fulton)
- Madison (Largest city: Richmond)
- Woodford (Largest city: Versailles)
