= Jack Conway (politician) =

American politician from Kentucky (born 1969)

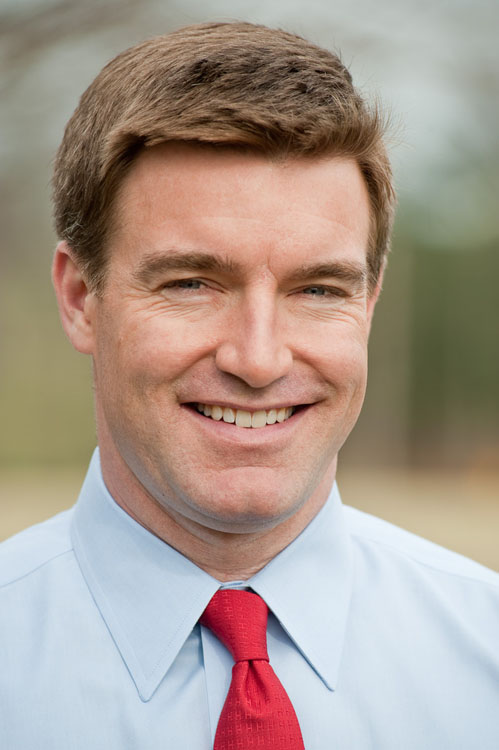
- Conway in 2010

49th Attorney General of Kentucky
- In office January 7, 2008 – January 4, 2016
- Governor: Steve Beshear; Matt Bevin
- Preceded by: Greg Stumbo
- Succeeded by: Andy Beshear

Personal details
- Born: John William Conway; July 5, 1969 (age 57) Louisville, Kentucky, U.S.
- Party: Democratic
- Spouse: Elizabeth Davenport
- Children: 2
- Education: Duke University (BA); George Washington University (JD)

John William Conway (born July 5, 1969) is an American lawyer and politician who served as the 49th attorney general of Kentucky from January 7, 2008, to January 4, 2016. Prior to his election as attorney general, he was the Democratic nominee for Kentucky's 3rd congressional district in the 2002 elections, narrowly losing to Republican incumbent Anne Northup.

Conway was the Democratic nominee in the 2010 U.S. Senate election, seeking the seat of the retiring Republican Senator Jim Bunning. He lost the general election to Republican nominee Rand Paul on November 2, 2010. He won re-election to a second term as attorney general in 2011 with 55% of the vote.

Conway ran for governor of Kentucky in the 2015 gubernatorial election, with State Representative Sannie Overly as his running mate. During the primary election held on May 19, 2015, Conway easily defeated retired engineer Geoff Young for the Democratic Party nomination. The Republican nominee Matt Bevin defeated Conway 52.5% to 43.8% with independent candidate Drew Curtis receiving 4% in the November 3, 2015 general election.

Conway currently [when?] practices law with the firm of Dolt, Thompson, Shepherd & Conway, focusing primarily on medical negligence, products liability, personal injury, trucking and auto accidents, and general negligence. He also sits on the bipartisan advisory board of States United Democracy Center.

== Early life and education ==
Conway was born in Louisville, Kentucky, and raised in a Roman Catholic family, the eldest of four siblings. His parents are Tom, a Louisville lawyer, and Barbara Conway. A graduate of St. Xavier High School, Conway earned a bachelor's degree in public policy studies from Duke University in 1991. From 1991 to 1997, he worked as legislative aide to the U.S. House Banking Committee. He graduated with a Juris Doctor from George Washington University Law School in 1995.

== Personal life ==
On May 20, 2006, Conway married Elizabeth Davenport; the couple has two children.

Conway and his father are partners in thoroughbred racehorse Stately Victor, named after Jack's childhood best friend, whose given name was Victor, who died at age 23. On April 11, 2010, the colt won the Grade I Blue Grass Stakes and later ran in the Kentucky Derby.

== Political career ==
Conway joined Paul E. Patton's gubernatorial campaign in September 1995. After being elected, Patton employed Conway as legal counsel to his executive cabinet and his chief energy advisor. Conway was the primary architect of the Kentucky Higher Education Reform Act of 1997, one of Patton's signature legislative accomplishments.

On August 3, 1999, Patton appointed Conway deputy secretary of his executive cabinet, serving under secretary Crit Luallen. Conway was responsible for drafting Patton's 2000 legislative package to the General Assembly. He also co-chaired task forces charged with investigating changes to the state's regulation of electrical utilities and the exposure of workers at the Paducah Gaseous Diffusion Plant to radioactive plutonium.

=== Campaign for U.S. House of Representatives ===
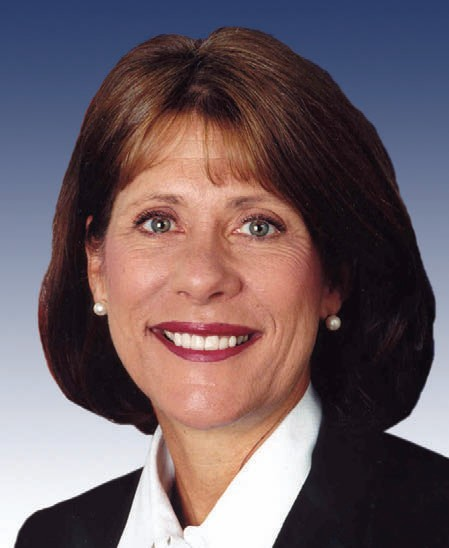
Anne Northup defeated Conway in the 2002 congressional elections.

Conway announced his resignation from Patton's cabinet in May 2001 amid speculation that he would seek the 3rd district congressional seat of incumbent Anne Northup. He believed Northup's vote to impeach President Bill Clinton in 1998 made her vulnerable in the Democratic-leaning district. Washington, D.C.-based Roll Call listed Northup among the ten most vulnerable incumbents entering the 2002 elections.

After having left state government, Conway joined the law firm of Conliffe Sandman Sullivan. On June 18, 2001, he officially announced his candidacy for Northup's seat. Later that week, Patton named Conway chair of the newly formed Kentucky State Energy Policy Advisory Board. The move angered state Republicans; state party chair Ellen Williams said that Conway's appointment "injected hard-core partisan politics" into the issue of the state's energy future. In May 2002, Conway resigned from the board, citing his election campaign.

The race also affected the General Assembly's ability to pass a reapportionment bill in 2002. The state Senate's Republican majority proposed adding Republican-leaning Oldham County to the 3rd district, while the Democrat-controlled state House resisted the plan, resulting in an impasse for much of the legislative session. Ultimately, the Assembly passed a plan that kept the 3rd district entirely within Jefferson County, adding several politically conservative suburbs of Louisville instead of Oldham County. Even with the addition of these areas, however, Democrats held a voter registration advantage of nearly two-to-one in the district. Both Conway and Northup expressed support for the approved district boundaries. Despite an extended filing deadline, neither candidate faced a challenge in their respective party primaries.

Conway portrayed Northup as an ineffective legislator who would not protect Social Security and healthcare benefits. Northup countered that, at 33 years old, Conway lacked experience, and said not being married had deprived him of "a responsibility to somebody else". She attacked Conway for his ties to Governor Patton, who had become embroiled in a sex-for-favors scandal. Northup's campaign raised and spent almost twice as much money as Conway's – aided by fundraisers featuring President George W. Bush (twice) and Vice President Dick Cheney – allowing her to run more television ads on the district's four network television stations. Conway countered with a rally at the headquarters of the local chapter of the United Auto Workers – who gave him their endorsement – featuring then-Democratic House Minority Leader Dick Gephardt. Gephardt promised if Conway were elected and if Democrats gained control of the House, that he would appoint Conway to the powerful Appropriations Committee, of which Northup was then a member. In the November 5 general election, Northup defeated Conway with 51.6% of the vote to Conway's 48.4%. Patton later told the Lexington Herald-Leader that he thought the scandal in his administration cost Democrats several legislative races, including Conway.

=== Political interim ===
Following the loss to Northup, Conway joined his father's legal practice. The Democratic Congressional Campaign Committee tried to convince Conway to run again for the same seat in 2004, but he declined, saying another loss could damage his nascent political career. He was also nominated as chairman of the state Democratic party, but withdrew his name from consideration, saying the position would take too much time from his law practice. In September 2004, Conway was named chairman of John Kerry's presidential campaign in Kentucky.

After State Auditor Crit Luallen and Louisville Mayor Jerry Abramson declined to seek the 2007 Democratic nomination for governor, Conway told the Lexington Herald-Leader that he would "step up and look at the race", although he conceded he would need to move quickly to raise enough money to run a competitive campaign. In November 2006, Conway announced that former Governor Brereton Jones had asked Conway to consider being his running mate if Jones sought the nomination; Conway said he would consider Jones' proposal while continuing to explore his own gubernatorial bid. When Congressman Ben Chandler, the Democratic gubernatorial nominee in 2003, announced in late November that he would not seek the nomination, Conway said he was seeking a running mate and lining up support for a gubernatorial campaign, estimating that he would need to raise a minimum of $2.5 million to be competitive.

In early December, Democratic leaders believed that Jones and Conway would run as a ticket for governor and lieutenant governor, but the deal fell apart days later when Jones announced he would not seek the office. A week later, State Treasurer Jonathan Miller, who had also discussed forming a ticket with Conway, announced he would seek the gubernatorial nomination with Jefferson County Attorney Irv Maze as his running mate instead of Conway. In late January 2007, after Bruce Lunsford named sitting Attorney General Greg Stumbo as his running mate in the gubernatorial contest, Conway said it was "highly likely" that he would seek that office in lieu of a gubernatorial bid.

=== Attorney General of Kentucky ===
==== Election ====
On January 30, 2007, Conway officially announced his candidacy for state attorney general at a rally at the Capitol Rotunda. His opponent in the Democratic primary was former Assistant Attorney General Robert Bullock. Conway stated that, as attorney general, he would prioritize a crackdown on drug and computer crimes and secure additional resources for local prosecutors, such as county and commonwealth's attorneys. Bullock's campaign called Conway an "inexperienced candidate – one who embraces style over substance".

Conway's campaign raised over $320,000, more than the five other attorney general candidates – Republican and Democrat – combined. The paper's editorial board endorsed Conway, although it opined, "Democrats can't go wrong Tuesday when they pick a nominee for attorney general." Conway received the endorsements of several labor organizations, including the AFL–CIO, the United Auto Workers, and the International Union of Electronic, Electrical, Salaried, Machine and Furniture Workers. Conway criticized Bullock for accepting the endorsement of the politically conservative Freedom's Heritage Forum, which issued the endorsement, in part because of Bullock's opposition to state universities' extension of domestic partnership benefits to its employees. Conway secured the Democratic nomination, winning the primary with 71.8 percent of the vote.

Conway's opponent in the general election was Lexington's Stan Lee, the minority whip in the state House of Representatives, who the Lexington Herald-Leader referred to as an "arch-conservative". Conway started with a large advantage in campaign cash, having carried over $154,544 from his primary campaign. Lee, the leading Republican fundraiser with over $134,000 raised in the primary campaign, started the race with only $3,365 left in his war chest.

Early in the race, Lee sought to make an issue of Democratic gubernatorial nominee Steve Beshear's call to amend the state constitution to allow casino gambling in the state. Lee publicly opposed the plan, saying it would lead to higher crime rates, and called on Conway to also denounce it. Conway's spokesman said his candidate would support putting the amendment on the ballot for voters to decide, provided the number of casino licenses were limited, counties were given a local option regarding whether to allow casinos in their communities, and all state revenue generated by the casinos was designated for healthcare, education, and protecting the state's economy.

In late September, Conway and Lee participated in a candidate forum held by the Northern Kentucky Chamber of Commerce. During the forum, Conway reiterated his priorities of reducing drug and Internet crimes, while Lee trumpeted his support for right-to-work laws and opposition to Kentucky's prevailing wage requirements. Lee also said Conway's acceptance of an endorsement from the Sierra Club and opposition to tort reform proved Conway was anti-business. Conway responded that he opposed caps on medical malpractice awards but favored other "common sense" ways to reduce frivolous lawsuits. The candidates agreed that the state constitution needed updating, but both said they would not support a constitutional convention to replace the entire document. Both candidates also expressed support for the death penalty. When Lee expressed socially conservative views in favor of posting the Ten Commandments in public spaces and opposing abortion and domestic partner benefits, Conway countered that Lee would not impartially consider the merits of cases involving those issues because he had already made up his mind about them.

In an early October candidate forum on Kentucky Educational Television, the candidates repeated several themes from the previous forum, but also addressed the issue of prison overcrowding. Conway said he supported rehabilitation activities in lieu of jail time for nonviolent offenders, while Lee maintained that incarceration was a deterrent to crime and said the state should study whether or not more penal institutions should be constructed. Lee attacked incumbent Attorney General Greg Stumbo's investigation of Governor Ernie Fletcher's hiring practices as politically motivated. He also thought politics motivated Stumbo's suits against OxyContin maker Purdue Pharma for the drug's widespread abuse in Appalachia and Marathon Petroleum for price gouging in the aftermaths of Hurricanes Katrina and Rita. Conway commended Stumbo's investigation of Fletcher as necessary and said he would likely continue to pursue the case against Purdue and Marathon if elected.

Conway won the general election on November 6, 2007, with 611,925 votes (60.5%) to Lee's 394,953 (39.5%).

==== Service ====
Conway was sworn into office on January 9, 2008, at the Capital Rotunda. The oath of office was administered by former Kentucky Supreme Court Justice Martin Johnson.

The 2008 legislative session of the Kentucky General Assembly convened the day after Conway's installation as attorney general. Throughout the session, Conway advocated passage of a bill designed to protect minors from online predators by restricting registered sex offenders' access to social networking sites and criminalizing cyberbullying, but the bill failed to come to a vote in the state Senate after passing in the state House of Representatives. The bill, which The Hazard Herald reported was written by Conway – was reintroduced by Representative Johnny Bell in the 2009 General Assembly, passing both chambers and being signed into law by Beshear in late March 2009.

In April 2008, Governor Steve Beshear requested a non-binding legal opinion from Conway regarding the hiring of Brad Cowgill as president of the Kentucky Council on Postsecondary Education. Beshear maintained that the council had not conducted a national search, as required by law, before hiring Cowgill, who had been serving as interim president after being appointed by Beshear's predecessor, Ernie Fletcher. Conway's opinion sustained Beshear's argument, and Cowgill resigned days later amid speculation that Beshear would seek a binding court judgment ordering a new search, ask for the resignations of all the members of the council, or use his executive authority to reorganize the council if Cowgill remained president.

The 2008 General Assembly also cut the budgets of county and commonwealth's attorneys, although Conway maintained that he lobbied to reduce or eliminate the cuts. Conway's office sustained a twelve percent cut in the final budget.

In June 2008, Conway announced a reorganization of his office in response to the budget cuts enacted by the General Assembly. Responsibility for child support enforcement was transferred to the Cabinet for Health and Family Services, and the Kentucky Bureau of Investigation was restructured and renamed the Department of Criminal Investigations (DCI). In September, Microsoft chose the Kentucky Attorney General's office as one of nine agencies nationwide to host its cybercrimes training seminars for law enforcement officers. Delivering on a campaign promise, the restructuring included the creation of a cybercrimes unit within the DCI. Conway created a forensics laboratory to prosecute Internet crimes and train prosecutors and police officers.

Following a sudden spike that sent gas prices above $4 per gallon in July 2008, Conway launched a price gouging investigation of several stations in Louisville. As prices continued to rise in anticipation of the landfall of Hurricane Ike in September, Governor Beshear signed an executive order declaring a state of emergency; Conway requested the order in order to trigger consumer protection provisions in the Kentucky Revised Statutes. After Ike triggered strong winds and storm damage in Kentucky, Conway's office issued a notice that the consumer protections also extended to construction contractors and individuals selling electrical generators to residents without power. In January 2009, Conway's office announced that seven stations in southern Kentucky – including five operated by Pilot Travel Centers and two operated by T-Mart – had agreed to a settlement in which they would pay a combined $107,500 in fines but admit to no wrongdoing.

Conway proposed a settlement in the dispute between the states of Kentucky and Ohio over the Indian Head Rock, an 8-short-ton (7,300 kg) boulder registered as a historical artifact in 1987. The dispute began in September 2007 when an Ohio historian led a team that removed the rock from its resting place in the Ohio River, claiming it was in danger of being damaged, and stored it in a city garage in Portsmouth, Ohio. Kentucky claimed ownership of the rock, and in November 2008, Conway called for the rock's return to Kentucky, a public apology from those who extracted the rock, and for the city of Portsmouth to pay to build a display for the rock on the Kentucky side of the river and cover the attorney's fees incurred by the state of Kentucky to that point in the dispute; in exchange, Conway would not file a federal lawsuit over the matter.

When the February 1, 2009, deadline for accepting the proposal passed, Conway filed suit in the U.S. District Court for Eastern Kentucky against the city of Portsmouth, the former mayor of Portsmouth, and two men who led the expedition to extract the rock. In July 2010, Conway's office announced that a settlement had been reached in which the rock would be returned to Kentucky in exchange for all federal charges being dropped.

Democratic State Representative Jody Richards asked Conway for an advisory opinion on whether allowing slot machines at Kentucky horse racing tracks would require an amendment to the state constitution in May 2009. Conway's immediate predecessor, Greg Stumbo, had issued a 2005 opinion stating that slots would be allowed under a 1992 amendment that permitted the creation of the Kentucky Lottery; that contradicted an earlier opinion issued by Stumbo's predecessor, Ben Chandler.

Before issuing the opinion, Conway asked for and received assurance from the Executive Branch Ethics Commission that his father's ownership of racehorses and service on the Kentucky Horse Racing Commission did not present a conflict of interest. On June 15, 2009, just hours before the General Assembly convened in a special session called by Governor Beshear to consider – among other issues – enabling legislation for video lottery terminals at state race tracks, Conway issued his opinion that a constitutional amendment would not be required to allow such devices. The enabling legislation passed the House but was voted down in the Senate budget committee during the special session.

Conway launched the Prescription Drug Diversion Task Force in August 2009, targeting prescription drug trafficking, overprescribing physicians, and illegal out-of-state pharmacies. The Task Force also conducted police training statewide. In October 2009, his office announced the arrest of 322 people in Eastern Kentucky in connection with a joint state-federal investigation of a multi-state prescription drug pipeline stretching from Pennsylvania to Florida. It was the largest such operation in state history.

Conway also prosecuted Medicaid fraud cases and renegotiated gas rates increases.

=== 2010 Senate election ===
==== Primary ====
Asked in November 2008 if he would consider challenging incumbent Republican Senator Jim Bunning for his seat in the 2010 election, Conway responded, "It's nice to be talked about. I'll certainly take a look at it." Politico described Conway as a viable candidate, citing his large margin of victory in the 2008 campaign for attorney general, his fundraising ability, and the age difference between him and Bunning. Conway consulted with Democratic Congressman Ben Chandler and state Auditor Crit Luallen about running for the seat.

With two Democratic candidates – Lieutenant Governor Daniel Mongiardo and former U.S. Customs agent Darlene Fitzgerald Price – already in the race, Conway said in February 2009 that he would make an announcement about his plans after the General Assembly adjourned on March 27. He officially announced his candidacy for the Senate via a video on his campaign web site on April 9, 2009. He subsequently kicked off his campaign with a rally at the Muhammad Ali Center in Louisville on April 13. At the rally, he received public endorsements from Democratic congressmen Ben Chandler and John Yarmuth, Louisville mayor Jerry Abramson, and State Auditor Crit Luallen; Governor Steve Beshear had previously endorsed Mongiardo.

In the first three months of his candidacy, Conway raised more than $1.3 million, which his campaign said was a record for a Democratic Senate candidate in Kentucky. Mongiardo raised only $303,000 during the same period. In late July 2009, Bunning announced he would retire from the Senate after opposition from members of his own party including Kentucky's senior Senator, Minority Leader Mitch McConnell, hampered his fundraising ability. Bunning's retirement created an open seat and cleared the way for Secretary of State Trey Grayson and Rand Paul – who had been fundraising without officially declaring their candidacies – to enter the Republican primary for the seat.

At the McCracken County Democratic Executive Committee's annual Alben Barkley Dinner, Conway and Mongiardo began making their cases for the nomination, with Mongiardo touting his experience as a medical doctor and emphasizing the importance of health care in the national dialogue and Conway countering that he would be able to address a broader range of issues as a senator. A further contrast came to light in July 2009 when Conway announced his support for the proposed American Clean Energy and Security Act, which would have created a system of emissions trading in the United States, but qualified his support by saying the bill should include language to protect affected consumers and businesses; Mongiardo called the bill a "terrible piece of legislation". The bill became an issue at the annual political picnic at Fancy Farm, Kentucky, with Mongiardo calling on Conway to condemn the legislation and Paul telling the crowd that "[Conway is] kind of against it a little bit and he's kind of for it a little bit". Following the event, The Washington Post's Chris Cillizza, moved the primary between Conway and Mongiardo from seventh to fifth in his list of the ten most competitive primaries in the nation. In October 2009, Conway announced his opposition to the Clean Energy Jobs and American Power Act, the Senate version of the emissions trading bill sponsored by Democratic Senators John Kerry (D-MA) and Barbara Boxer (D-CA).

Officially filing his candidacy papers on January 19, 2010 – the day Republican Scott Brown dealt national Democrats a blow by upsetting Democrat Martha Coakley in a special election to fill the Massachusetts Senate seat left vacant by the death of Edward Kennedy – Conway highlighted several issues where he differed with the national party. Saying he would ask to be assigned to the Senate Armed Services committee if elected, he criticized President Barack Obama's decision to increase the number of U.S. troops in Afghanistan in the lead-up to Operation Strike of the Sword in June 2009. He further criticized the administration's decision to try suspected terrorists in civilian courts rather than military tribunals.

Conway said he would have opposed the Patient Protection and Affordable Care Act because it did not allow insurance companies to sell their products across state lines and included a higher Medicaid reimbursement rate for Nebraska to secure support for the measure from Ben Nelson, a conservative Democratic Senator from Nebraska. When Congress later dropped Nebraska's Medicaid provision, Conway said the bill was still "far from perfect", but conceded he would have voted for it. Mongiardo opposed the bill, saying "If Jack Conway believes this is the magic solution to health care, it's proof that we need to send a doctor to the Senate, not just another politician."

Conway also proposed that, as companies repaid the federal government for money directed to them by the Emergency Economic Stabilization Act of 2008, those funds be used to support small business loans made by local banks and to provide a dollar-for-dollar tax credit to employers who created new domestic jobs, a plan he called the Hometown Tax Credit.

In March 2010, a WHAS/Courier Journal poll showed Mongiardo leading Conway by 18 percentage points among likely primary voters. By April, Mongiardo's lead was down to 3 percentage points, falling within the poll's margin of error. WHAS noted that Conway's surge corresponded with the beginning of his television advertising campaign, particularly in western Kentucky.

Two weeks before the primary, Mongiardo filed an ethics complaint against Conway alleging that Conway's receipt of more than $70,000 in donations from utility company lobbyists represented a conflict of interest because the Office of Rate Intervention, a division of the attorney general's office, routinely evaluates whether requests to increase utility rates are warranted. Conway's spokeswoman responded that, in his two and a half years as attorney general, Conway had saved ratepayers "$100 million dollars by forcing proposed rate hikes to be lower in 18 cases before the [Public Service Commission] since 2008". Mongiardo's complaint further alleged that Conway stood to benefit from a requested rate increase by Atmos Energy, a partner of Kinder Morgan, a company in which Conway had a financial interest. The Lexington Herald-Leader reported that Conway ultimately negotiated a 38 percent reduction in Atmos Energy's request in the case. On July 14, 2010, the ethics complaint against Conway was dropped and the Kentucky ethics panel stated "campaign contributions aren't considered gifts under the ethics code, and as a result the ethics commission doesn't have jurisdiction."

==== General election ====
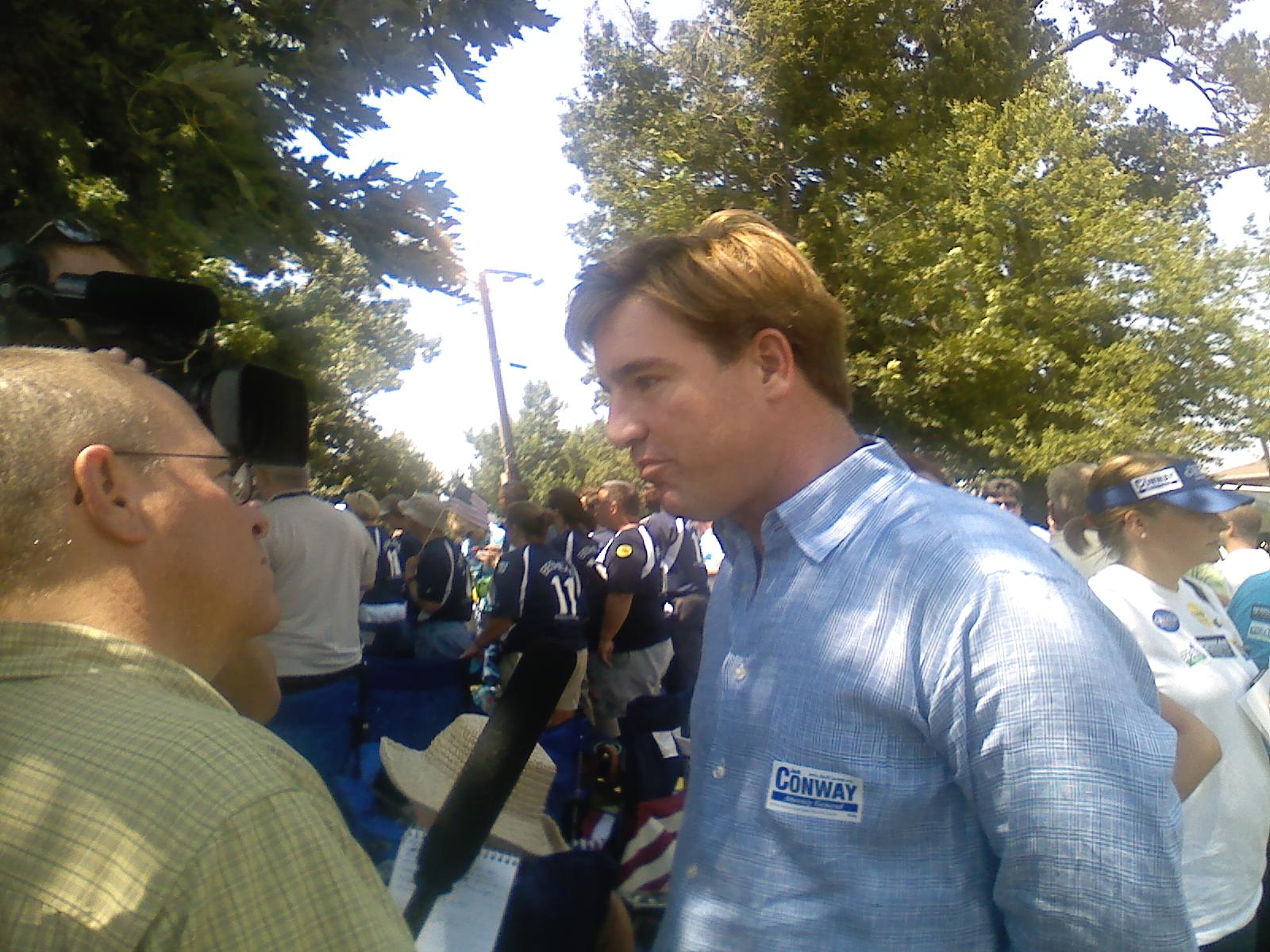
Conway at Fancy Farm 2011

On May 18, 2010, Conway narrowly won the primary election to secure the Democratic nomination and face Republican nominee Rand Paul for the Senate seat in November 2010. Conway criticized Paul for his position on the Civil Rights Act of 1964. He first claimed Paul wanted to "repeal" it and later stated that Paul rejected and would have opposed inclusion of a "fundamental provision of the act". Conway criticized Paul for a 2002 letter in which Paul opposed the Fair Housing Act. Paul had stated that "a free society" should allow discrimination by private businesses even if he disagreed. Conway argued that Paul held a "narrow, rigid philosophy that government shouldn't deal with businesses at all".

As of July 15, 2010, Conway had received $3.4 million in campaign contributions and loaned his campaign $525,000, surpassing Paul in available funds. Conway had been criticized by Paul for appearing at a fundraising event with a contingent of American trial lawyers in Canada.

On October 15, 2010, in the wake of news coverage of Paul's alleged activities in college, Conway began running a TV ad asking why Paul joined a group at Baylor that mocked Christianity and told a classmate his god was "Aqua Buddha". The ad triggered an angry response from Paul, who claimed Conway was questioning his Christian faith. The ad was controversial, but the Conway campaign continued to run it, saying that it questioned Paul's judgment, not his faith.

=== 2015 gubernatorial election ===
Conway ran for Governor of Kentucky in the 2015 gubernatorial election, with State Representative Sannie Overly as his running mate. During the primary election held on May 19, 2015, Conway defeated retired engineer Geoff Young for the Democratic Party nomination with 78.8 percent of the vote.

In the general election held on November 3, 2015, Republican Matt Bevin defeated Conway 52.5% to 43.8% with independent candidate Drew Curtis receiving 4% of the vote.

== Political positions ==
A July 2010 review of Conway's public statements over the last decade by The Courier-Journal found that while he does have liberal views on some issues such as reproductive rights and health-care reform, his outlook is conservative or moderate on others, including the death penalty. He told the interviewer, "I consider myself a political moderate. Fiscally, I can be pretty conservative. I'm pretty conservative, I think, on the 2nd Amendment."

=== Abortion ===
Conway supports legalized abortion that "should be as rare as possible, but should be kept safe and legal." He opposes late-term abortion, and opposes a constitutional amendment to ban abortion. In his October 25, 2010 debate with Rand Paul, he reiterated his earlier statement that abortion should be rare but also safe and legal.

=== Animal welfare ===
In March 2014, Conway joined Kentucky to a lawsuit filed by Missouri Attorney General Chris Koster against California's egg production standards. In October 2014, a federal judge dismissed the lawsuit, rejecting the states' challenge to Proposition 2, California's prohibition on the sale of eggs laid by caged hens kept in conditions more restrictive than those approved by California voters in a 2008 ballot initiative. Judge Kimberly Mueller ruled that Kentucky and the other states lacked legal standing to sue on behalf of their residents and that the plaintiffs were representing solely the interests of egg farmers, not "a substantial statement of their populations."

=== Civil liberties ===
In 2002, Conway expressed support for some provisions of the Patriot Act. In 2010, he expressed satisfaction that the act had been amended to provide more judicial restraint of surveillance by federal agents. On February 27, 2014, Conway filed for a 90-day delay on District Court Judge John Heyburn's February 12, 2014 ruling, which ruled that Kentucky's ban on recognizing same-sex marriages from other states was unconstitutional. Conway stated that he was contemplating an appeal of the ruling. On March 4, Conway announced he would not appeal the ruling, saying it had been decided correctly in his opinion. Governor Beshear announced he would retain outside counsel to pursue the appeal.

=== Firearms ===
In a 2002 Project Vote Smart survey, Conway stated, "I support the 2nd Amendment--and believe there is nothing wrong with owning a gun for personal protection or recreation." Conway supported maintaining and strengthening current federal legislation, such as required background checks at gun shows and child safety locks, but opposed raising the legal age from 18 to 21 and also opposed requiring a license for gun possession.

=== Foreign policy ===
Conway stated in 2002, during his congressional campaign, that he supported George W. Bush's foreign policy and would have voted to authorize the 2003 invasion of Iraq. In 2010, Conway told The Courier-Journal that he now opposes the Iraq War because the Bush administration overstated Saddam Hussein's efforts to obtain weapons of mass destruction, adding that "In this case, they trumped up the intelligence and then they didn't have a plan for winning the peace".

=== Immigration ===
Conway supports a pathway to legalization for some illegal immigrants, but said that preference should be given to those here legally. He has called for action against businesses that employ illegal aliens. He believes that "If you're born on the United States soil, then you're a United States citizen," and opposes breaking up families by deporting parents of children born here.

=== Jobs and the economy ===
Conway proposed a hometown tax credit to reward companies and small businesses that create jobs in Kentucky. Employers who prove they've boosted employment over the previous year by creating new jobs, increasing paid hours, or raising wages, would qualify for a 20% tax credit. The total benefit would be capped at $500,000 per firm. Conway says such a tax credit would be fully paid for by repealing foreign income and interest deductions, and closing offshore tax loopholes. Conway's jobs plan also calls for the creation of a Small Business Loan Fund that will put $30 billion of new capital toward lending for small businesses through community banks and credit unions.

In 2002, while running for the U.S. House of Representatives, Conway supported the Bush tax cuts. During the 2010 primary for the U.S. Senate seat in Kentucky, Conway told the editorial board of The Courier-Journal that most of the Bush tax cuts should be allowed to expire. In early August 2010 Conway told CN|2 Politics, "I don't think that a recession is any time to raise taxes. So I think the Bush tax cuts ought to be extended for some period of time, especially the individual taxes, the estate tax provisions, keeping the capital gains tax at 15 percent. I think they ought to be extended".

=== Labor ===
Conway was a supporter of the Employee Free Choice Act. In a 2010 debate, Conway said that employees should be able to unionize if over 50% of them signed a card.

=== Medicare and Social Security ===
If elected to the Senate, Conway says the first piece of legislation he will introduce would repeal what he calls a "sweetheart deal" for the pharmaceutical industry that currently prohibits Medicare from negotiating for lower prices on prescription drugs. Citing a report from the National Committee on Social Security and Medicare, he says that this alone would save the federal government $200 billion.

Conway opposes privatizing Social Security and thinks these benefits should be maintained and protected from any outside risks associated with the financial markets. In his 2002 run for Congress Conway stated that raising the retirement age and cutting benefit levels "to save Social Security" has to be considered, but retracted these comments by November 2002.

=== War on Drugs ===
Conway has stated that ""We need a United States senator who understands that we need federal funding for treatment, we need federal funding for law enforcement investigators, and we need a collaborative approach of federal, state and local (resources) to deal with the drug problem" in Kentucky where prescription drug abuse is of particular concern. Conway has pledged his steadfast support of Operation UNITE, an anti-drug initiative in Kentucky that receives the majority of its funding at the federal level. He called for the creation of a network of prescription pill tracking systems across the United States, where each state would adopt a prescription pill tracking program similar to the KASPER system in Kentucky.

When asked if he was in favor of hemp farming for Kentucky, Conway replied:

It's a law enforcement issue. The problem with hemp is, when you're trying to eradicate marijuana, which is a major law enforcement issue in Kentucky, I know how difficult it can be for law enforcement to make the distinction, and so I think we need to leave that issue to those in law enforcement who are advising us on it. If there's a difficulty in distinguishing between hemp and marijuana then we shouldn't have hemp farming in Kentucky, because it's more of a law enforcement issue about making certain we don't let a gateway drug get into the marketplace.

Conway indicated in a 2002 Project Vote Smart survey that he does not support decriminalizing the use of marijuana for medical purposes.

Legal offices
Preceded by Greg Stumbo	Attorney General of Kentucky; 2008–2016	Succeeded by Andy Beshear
Party political offices
Preceded by Greg Stumbo	Democratic nominee for Attorney General of Kentucky; 2007, 2011	Succeeded by Andy Beshear
Preceded by Daniel Mongiardo	Democratic nominee for U.S. Senator from Kentucky (Class 3); 2010	Succeeded by Jim Gray
Preceded by Steve Beshear	Democratic nominee for Governor of Kentucky; 2015	Succeeded by Andy Beshear
