= Sannie Overly =

American politician (born 1966)

Chair of the Kentucky Democratic Party
- In office February 2, 2016 – November 11, 2017
- Preceded by: Patrick Hughes
- Succeeded by: Ben Self

Majority Caucus Chair of the Kentucky House of Representatives
- In office January 8, 2013 – January 3, 2017
- Preceded by: Robert Damron
- Succeeded by: David Meade

Member of the Kentucky House of Representatives from the 72nd district
- In office January 14, 2008 – January 1, 2019
- Preceded by: Carolyn Belcher
- Succeeded by: Matthew Koch

Personal details
- Born: Sannie Louise Overly; July 2, 1966 (age 60) Millersburg, Kentucky, U.S.
- Party: Democratic
- Spouse: Michael Kalinyak
- Children: 2
- Education: University of Kentucky (BS); University of Louisville (JD)
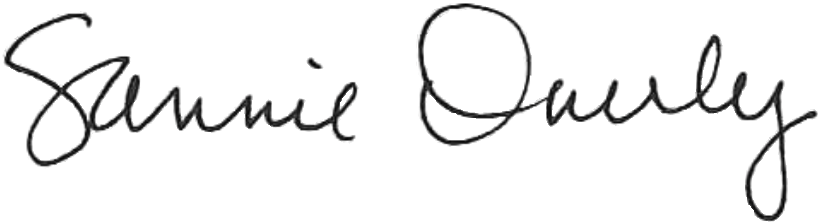
- Signature

Sannie Louise Overly (born July 2, 1966) is an American lawyer, engineer, and politician. A member of the Democratic Party, Overly served in the Kentucky House of Representatives, representing Kentucky's 72nd House district. She served as House Majority Caucus Chair from 2013 to 2017, and is the first woman to serve in a leadership role in the Kentucky House. She was the Democratic Party nominee for lieutenant governor of Kentucky in 2015, and was elected chair of the Kentucky Democratic Party in 2016.

== Early life and education ==
Overly was born in Millersburg, Kentucky, and graduated from Bourbon County High School. Overly graduated from the University of Kentucky College of Engineering with a Bachelor of Science in civil engineering in 1989, and the University of Louisville School of Law with a Juris Doctor in 1993.

== Career ==
Overly served as president of the Bourbon County Bar Association and of the Paris–Bourbon County Historic Society. She worked as an engineer for the Kentucky Transportation Cabinet.

Overly ran in a special election to the Kentucky House of Representatives to succeed Carolyn Belcher as representative of the 72nd district. She won the election on January 8, 2008, and was sworn in on January 11. In 2009, Greg Stumbo, Speaker of the Kentucky House, appointed Overly to chair the Budget Review Subcommittee, which has oversight over the state's roads. She became the first woman to chair the budget subcommittee. At the start of the 2013 session, Overly was elected caucus chair by her Democratic House colleagues, making her the first woman to hold a leadership position in the Kentucky House. She is the last Democrat to hold this office since the Republican Party took the majority in 2017.

Overly had considered running in the 2014 election against Republican Andy Barr to represent Kentucky's 6th congressional district in the United States House of Representatives. However, she instead ran for lieutenant governor of Kentucky on a ticket with Jack Conway in the 2015 gubernatorial election. Conway and Overly lost the election to Matt Bevin and his running mate, Jenean Hampton.

In 2016, Overly was elected as the chair of the Kentucky Democratic Party. She opted not to seek reelection to the Kentucky House in 2018. Overly is a practicing attorney and operates her family's cattle farm in Bourbon County, Kentucky.

== Personal life ==
Overly and her husband, Michael Kalinyak, live in Paris, Kentucky, and have two children. Sannie Overly grew up on a farm in Millersburg, Kentucky. She has been involved in many organizations in Kentucky. Overly serves on the board of New Vista, Emerge Kentucky and the Henry Clay Center. She previously served on board of BCTC. She is a member of the Friends of the Paris-Bourbon Co Library, Bourbon County Alumni Assoc., UK Alumni Assoc., Bourbon County Homemakers, DAR, Jemima Johnson Chapter and the Bluegrass Conservancy.

Party political offices
Preceded by Jerry Abramson	Democratic nominee for Lieutenant Governor of Kentucky; 2015	Succeeded by Jacqueline Coleman
