= 2004 United States Senate election in Kentucky =

- November 2, 2004
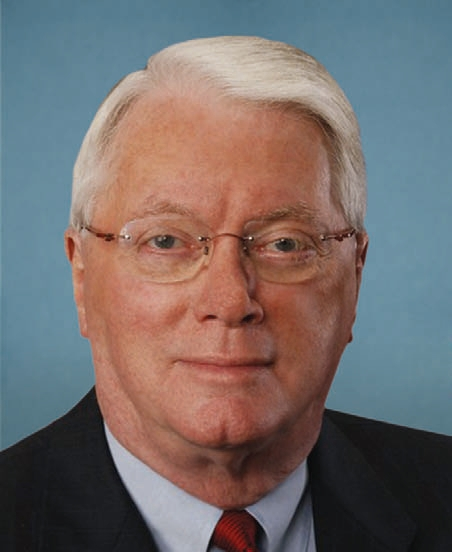

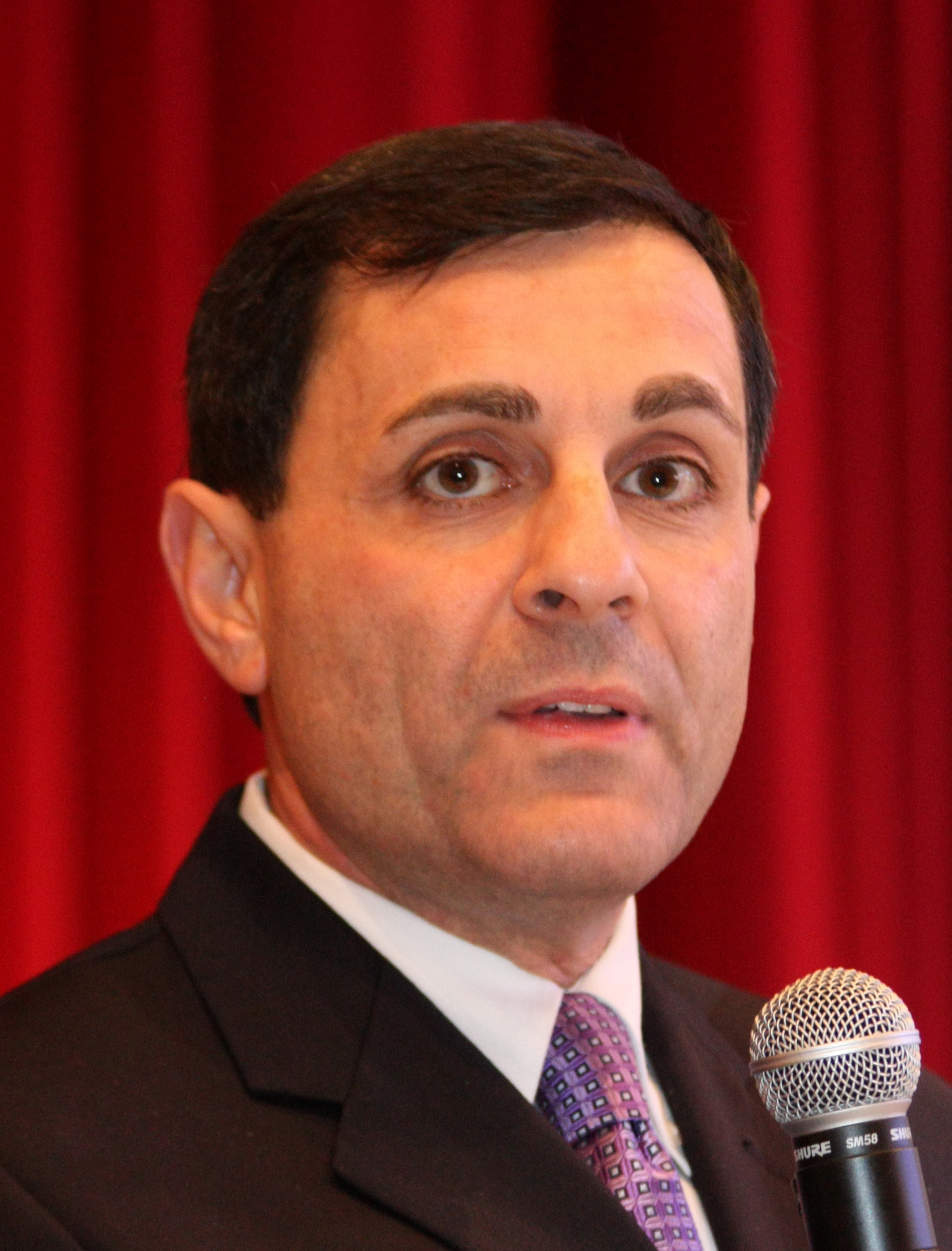
Nominee	Jim Bunning	Daniel Mongiardo
Party	Republican	Democratic
Popular vote	873,507	850,855
Percentage	50.66%	49.34%
- County results Bunning: 50–60% 60–70% 70–80% Mongiardo: 50–60% 60–70% 70–80% 80–90%
U.S. senator before election
Jim Bunning
Republican
Elected U.S. Senator
Jim Bunning
Republican

The 2004 United States Senate election in Kentucky took place on November 2, 2004, alongside other elections to the United States Senate in other states as well as elections to the United States House of Representatives and various state and local elections. Incumbent Republican U.S. Senator Jim Bunning narrowly won re-election to a second term over Democratic State Senator Daniel Mongiardo. This election was the first time since 1962 that an incumbent Republican senator won re-election to this seat.

== Republican primary ==
=== Candidates ===
- Jim Bunning, incumbent U.S. senator since 1999
- Barry Metcalf, former state senator from Richmond and candidate for U.S. Senate in 1998

=== Results ===
Republican primary results
Party	Candidate	Votes	%
Republican	Jim Bunning (incumbent)	96,545	84.00%
Republican	Barry Metcalf	18,395	16.00%
Total votes		114,940	100.00%

== Democratic primary ==
=== Background ===
Former governor Paul E. Patton was considered the initial frontrunner in the Democratic primary, but he opted not to run due to a scandal over an extramarital affair. Eventually, the Democrats settled on Daniel Mongiardo, a relatively unknown doctor and state senator from Hazard.

=== Candidates ===
- Daniel Mongiardo, physician and state senator from Hazard
- David Lynn Williams, perennial candidate

==== Declined ====
- Paul E. Patton, former governor of Kentucky (1995–2003)

=== Results ===
Results by county: Mongiardo: 50–60%; 60–70%; 70–80%; 80–90%; >90%; Williams: 50–60%; 60–70%

Democratic primary results
Party	Candidate	Votes	%
Democratic	Daniel Mongiardo	142,162	64.92
Democratic	David L. Williams	76,807	35.08
Total votes		218,969	100.0

== General election ==
=== Candidates ===
- Jim Bunning, incumbent U.S. senator since 1999 (Republican)
- Daniel Mongiardo, physician and state senator from Hazard (Democratic)

=== Campaign ===
During his reelection bid in 2004, controversy erupted when Bunning described Mongiardo as looking "like one of Saddam Hussein's sons." Bunning apologized, then later went on to declare that Mongiardo's "thugs" had assaulted his wife.

Bunning had an estimated $4 million campaign war chest, while Mongiardo had only $600,000. The Democrats began increasing financial support to Mongiardo when it became apparent that Bunning's bizarre behavior was costing him votes, purchasing more than $800,000 worth of additional television airtime on his behalf.

The November 2 election was one of the closest in Kentucky history. The race turned out to be very close, with Mongiardo leading with as many as 80% of the returns coming in. However, Bunning eventually won by just over one percentage point after the western portion of the state, which is on Central Time, broke heavily for him. Some analysts felt that because of President George W. Bush's 20% margin of victory in the state, Bunning was able to effectively ride the President's coattails to victory.

=== Predictions ===
Source	Ranking	As of
Sabato's Crystal Ball	Lean R	November 1, 2004

=== Polling ===
Poll source	Date(s) administered	Sample size (Note: Key: A – all adults RV – registered voters LV – likely voters V – unclear)	Margin of error	Jim Bunning (R)	Daniel Mongiardo (D)	Other	Undecided
SurveyUSA (Note: Poll conducted for WHAS-TV & WLEX-TV)	October 28–30, 2004	631 (LV)	± 4.0%	51%	42%	5%	2%
The Courier-Journal	October 18–20, 2004	690 (LV)	± 3.7%	49%	43%	–	8%
SurveyUSA	October 17–19, 2004	623 (LV)	± 4.0%	53%	39%	6%	2%
Garin-Hart-Yang (D) (Note: Poll sponsored by the DSCC, which supports Mongiardo)	October 15–17, 2004	503 (LV)	± 4.4%	43% (Note: With voters who lean towards a given candidate)	43%	–	14%
Garin-Hart-Yang (D)	October 15–17, 2004	503 (LV)	± 4.4%	39%	40%	–	21%
Garin-Hart-Yang (D)	October 6–7, 2004	503 (LV)	± 4.4%	47%	39%	–	14%
Garin-Hart-Yang (D)	October 6–7, 2004	503 (LV)	± 4.4%	43%	37%	–	20%
SurveyUSA	October 4–6, 2004	615 (LV)	± 4.0%	51%	40%	7%	2%
Public Opinion Strategies (R)	October 2004	600 (LV)	± 4.0%	50%	39%	–	11%
The Courier-Journal	September 10–15, 2004	657 (LV)	± 3.8%	51%	34%	–	15%
SurveyUSA	September 7–9, 2004	659 (LV)	± 3.9%	54%	35%	9%	2%
Garin-Hart-Yang (D) (Note: Poll sponsored by Mongiardo's campaign)	May 19–20, 2004	504 (LV)	± 4.5%	48%	39%	–	13%

=== Results ===
2004 Kentucky U.S. Senator general election
Party	Candidate	Votes	%	±%
Republican	Jim Bunning (incumbent)	873,507	50.66%	+0.91%
Democratic	Daniel Mongiardo	850,855	49.34%	+0.18%
Turnout		1,724,362		
Republican hold		Swing		

=== By county ===
County	Bunning	Votes	Mongiardo	Votes
Adair	69%	4,857	31%	2,151
Allen	70%	4,640	30%	2,030
Anderson	51%	4,676	49%	4,540
Ballard	43%	1,752	57%	2,331
Barren	58%	8,749	42%	6,459
Bath	37%	1,673	63%	2,910
Bell	44%	4,442	56%	5,646
Boone	71%	31,162	29%	12,543
Bourbon	46%	3,614	54%	4,250
Boyd	49%	10,181	51%	10,713
Boyle	52%	6,179	48%	5,806
Bracken	66%	2,249	34%	1,183
Breathitt	28%	1,607	72%	4,201
Breckinridge	57%	4,633	43%	3,550
Bullitt	57%	15,675	43%	11,913
Butler	70%	3,665	30%	1,601
Caldwell	50%	3,025	50%	3,034
Calloway	51%	7,456	49%	7,063
Campbell	64%	24,603	36%	14,079
Carlisle	48%	1,327	52%	1,412
Carroll	48%	1,788	52%	1,971
Carter	45%	4,794	55%	5,754
Casey	75%	4,483	25%	1,476
Christian	63%	12,331	37%	7,304
Clark	48%	7,047	52%	7,559
Clay	62%	4,336	38%	2,643
Clinton	77%	3,094	23%	937
Crittenden	55%	2,214	45%	1,813
Cumberland	73%	2,103	27%	782
Daviess	51%	20,148	49%	19,739
Edmonson	62%	3,165	38%	1,942
Elliott	28%	801	72%	2,025
Estill	55%	2,892	45%	2,414
Fayette	41%	50,209	59%	70,798
Fleming	52%	3,080	48%	2,815
Floyd	29%	5,015	71%	12,092
Franklin	34%	7,998	66%	15,324
Fulton	46%	1,237	54%	1,426
Gallatin	59%	1,736	41%	1,184
Garrard	60%	3,767	40%	2,556
Grant	65%	5,497	35%	3,007
Graves	48%	7,448	52%	8,036
Grayson	62%	5,894	38%	3,618
Green	68%	3,324	32%	1,556
Greenup	50%	7,804	50%	7,874
Hancock	48%	1,834	52%	2,010
Hardin	57%	19,916	43%	14,910
Harlan	31%	3,340	69%	7,265
Harrison	50%	3,738	50%	3,702
Hart	56%	3,518	44%	2,785
Henderson	47%	8,419	53%	9,490
Henry	52%	3,266	48%	3,024
Hickman	49%	1,093	51%	1,159
Hopkins	56%	10,161	44%	7,930
Jackson	78%	3,755	22%	1,070
Jefferson	40%	134,699	60%	198,541
Jessamine	56%	10,002	44%	7,730
Johnson	59%	5,242	41%	3,711
Kenton	65%	42,158	35%	22,759
Knott	19%	1,345	81%	5,811
Knox	59%	6,685	41%	4,591
LaRue	60%	3,429	40%	2,241
Laurel	67%	14,427	33%	7,014
Lawrence	54%	3,322	46%	2,790
Lee	59%	1,606	41%	1,126
Leslie	51%	2,438	49%	2,339
Letcher	32%	2,751	68%	5,884
Lewis	70%	3,562	30%	1,509
Lincoln	57%	4,870	43%	3,695
Livingston	45%	2,025	55%	2,520
Logan	59%	5,847	41%	4,099
Lyon	45%	1,680	55%	2,082
Madison	50%	14,743	50%	14,790
Magoffin	43%	2,100	57%	2,816
Marion	41%	2,881	59%	4,112
Marshall	48%	7,191	52%	7,937
Martin	65%	2,744	35%	1,497
Mason	59%	3,884	41%	2,748
McCracken	52%	14,934	48%	13,940
McCreary	71%	3,603	29%	1,501
McLean	49%	2,078	51%	2,179
Meade	53%	5,574	47%	5,000
Menifee	39%	946	61%	1,484
Mercer	53%	5,019	47%	4,534
Metcalfe	58%	2,260	42%	1,608
Monroe	77%	3,940	23%	1,156
Montgomery	43%	4,130	57%	5,558
Morgan	39%	1,800	61%	2,758
Muhlenberg	44%	5,604	56%	7,178
Nelson	48%	7,754	52%	8,300
Nicholas	43%	1,236	57%	1,638
Ohio	56%	5,371	44%	4,202
Oldham	59%	15,751	41%	10,731
Owen	58%	2,637	42%	1,909
Owsley	63%	1,142	37%	660
Pendleton	65%	3,824	35%	2,042
Perry	23%	2,620	77%	8,659
Pike	39%	9,672	61%	15,293
Powell	41%	1,961	59%	2,806
Pulaski	67%	16,053	33%	7,848
Robertson	54%	559	46%	468
Rockcastle	69%	3,956	31%	1,812
Rowan	40%	3,388	60%	5,032
Russell	69%	5,092	31%	2,242
Scott	49%	8,126	51%	8,364
Shelby	54%	8,544	46%	7,269
Simpson	56%	3,665	44%	2,938
Spencer	57%	3,799	43%	2,821
Taylor	63%	6,119	37%	3,643
Todd	63%	2,696	37%	1,550
Trigg	58%	3,354	42%	2,457
Trimble	50%	1,865	50%	1,852
Union	49%	2,791	51%	2,880
Warren	56%	21,258	44%	16,457
Washington	56%	2,761	44%	2,146
Wayne	60%	4,214	40%	2,783
Webster	48%	2,490	52%	2,738
Whitley	64%	8,082	36%	4,620
Wolfe	33%	911	67%	1,856
Woodford	44%	4,887	56%	6,196

==== Counties that flipped from Democratic to Republican ====
- Bell (largest city: Middlesboro)
- Trimble (largest city: Bedford)
- Logan (largest city: Russellville)
- Hopkins (largest city: Madisonville)
- Meade (largest city: Brandenburg)
- Trigg (largest city: Cadiz)
- Henry (largest city: Eminence)
- Lawrence (largest city: Louisa)
- Harrison (largest city: Cynthiana)
- Simpson (largest city: Franklin)
- McCracken (largest city: Paducah)
- Lincoln (largest city: Stanford)
- Robertson (largest municipality: Mount Olivet)
- Daviess (largest city: Owensboro)
- Green (largest city: Greensburg)
- Calloway (largest city: Murray)
- Estill (largest city: Irvine)
- Fleming (largest city: Flemingsburg)
- LaRue (largest city: Hodgenville)
- Mercer (largest city: Harrodsburg)
- Metcalfe (largest city: Edmonton)
- Owen (largest city: Owenton)
- Spencer (largest city: Taylorsville)
- Todd (largest city: Elkton)
- Boyle (largest city: Daville)
- Washington (largest city: Springfield)

== See also ==
- 2004 United States Senate elections

== Notes ==
Partisan clients
