= Geoff Young =

American perennial candidate (born 1956)

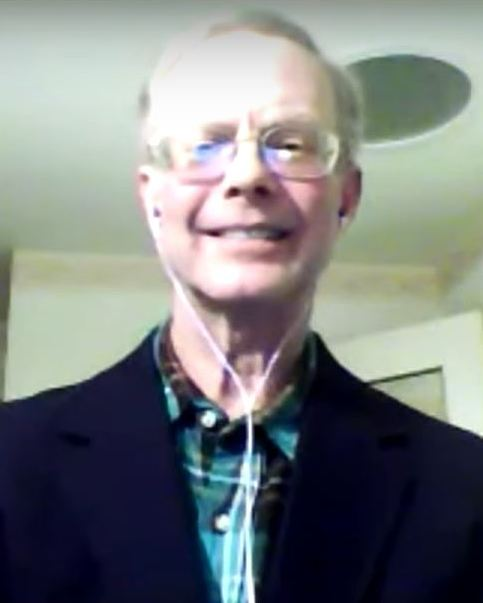
- Young in 2016
- Born: June 25, 1956 (age 70); Boston, Massachusetts, U.S.
- Education: Massachusetts Institute of Technology; University of Kentucky
- Political party: Kentucky Party (2025–present)
- Other political affiliations: Green (2012); Republican (2020); Democratic (2014–2019, 2022–2024)
- Website: https://www.young4ky.com/

Geoffrey M. Young (born June 25, 1956) is an American perennial candidate and agricultural economist who has run for numerous offices in Kentucky. He ran for the U.S. House of Representatives in Kentucky's 6th congressional district in 2014, 2016, 2018, 2020 and 2022, as well as for Governor of Kentucky in 2015, 2019 and 2023. Young has sought office as a member of the Green, Democratic, and Republican parties, and has been a member of the Kentucky Party since 2024.

Young is currently a Kentucky Party candidate for the 75th district in the 2026 Kentucky House of Representatives election.

== Early life and education ==
Young was born in Massachusetts. He graduated from Marblehead High School in 1974 and earned a Bachelor's degree in economics from Massachusetts Institute of Technology in 1977, and a Master's degree in mechanical engineering from the University of Massachusetts at Amherst in 1981. In 1982, he moved to Fayette County, Kentucky to attend the University of Kentucky; he graduated with a master's degree in Agricultural economics in 1988.

== Political career ==
Young is a perennial candidate from Kentucky. Young first ran for office in 2012 as the Kentucky Green Party candidate for state house District 45. By 2022, Young had never made it past a primary election and had run for the Democratic Party's nomination in Kentucky's 6th congressional district in 2014, 2016, and 2018 and for the Governor of Kentucky in 2015 and 2019. In 2020, Young ran as a Republican for Kentucky's 6th congressional district and lost the primary. Young has frequently filed lawsuits against the Kentucky Democratic Party, claiming they had rigged primary elections against him.

In 2022, Young won the Democratic Party's nomination for Kentucky's 6th congressional district in the race against Andy Barr. The Kentucky Democratic Party refused to endorse or support Young's campaign due to frequent lawsuits being filed against them by Young, and Governor Andy Beshear refused to endorse Young because he had allegedly called Beshear a "criminal" in front of Beshear's son, with Beshear adding that Young "needs help". During the 2022 campaign, Young was denounced by Democrats and Republicans for claiming Ukraine was controlled by Nazis and for supporting the Russian invasion of Ukraine. In 2023, Young ran in the Kentucky Democratic gubernatorial primary against Beshear and Peppy Martin. Beshear won the primary with over 90% of the vote. On December 5, 2023, he filed to run for representative of Kentucky's 3rd congressional district in the 2024 elections. He faced incumbent Morgan McGarvey and Jared Randall in the primary election on May 21, 2024, losing with 11.2% of the vote against McGarvey's 84.1%.

== Personal life ==
Young is Jewish.
