= 2026 United States Senate election in Kentucky =

- November 3, 2026

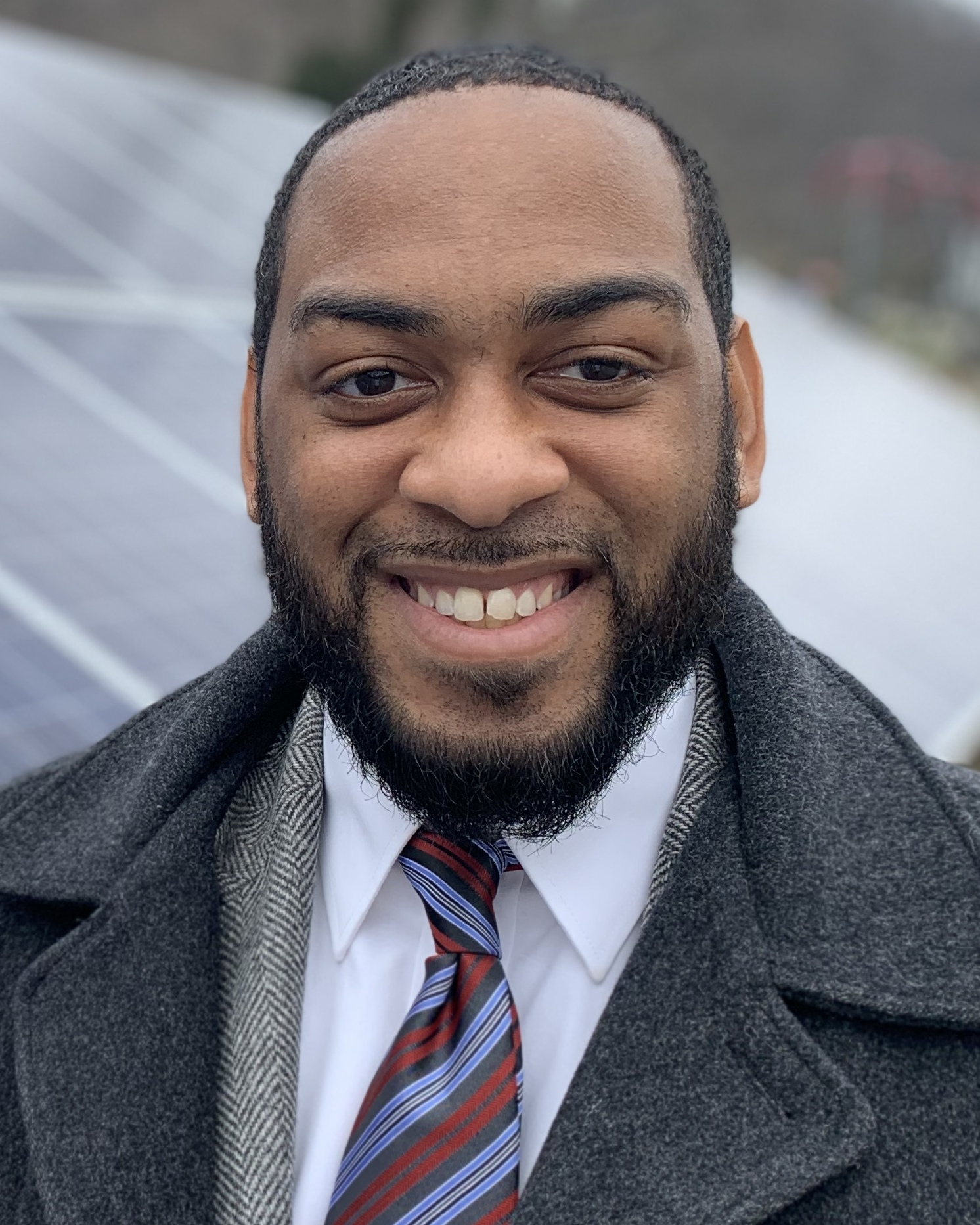
| Nominee | Andy Barr | Charles Booker |
| Party | Republican | Democratic |
| Popular vote | 784,869 | 612,357 |
| Percentage | 54.99% | 42.90% |
- Barr: 40–50% 50–60% 60–70% 70–80% 80–90% Booker: 40–50% 50–60% 60–70%
U.S. senator before election
Mitch McConnell
Republican
Elected U.S. senator
Andy Barr
Republican

The 2026 United States Senate election in Kentucky was held on November 3, 2026, to elect a member of the United States Senate to represent the state of Kentucky. Republican representative Andy Barr defeated Democratic former state representative Charles Booker. Republican incumbent Mitch McConnell did not seek an eighth term.

Primary elections were held on May 19. Endorsed by President Donald Trump, Barr won the Republican nomination with 60.5% of the vote over former state attorney general Daniel Cameron. Booker, the Democratic nominee in 2022, was nominated a second time with 47% of the vote over Marine officer Amy McGrath and state House minority leader Pamela Stevenson.

== Background ==
Kentucky, a Southern state in the Bible Belt, is generally considered to be a Republican stronghold, having not elected a Democrat to the U.S. Senate since 1992. Republicans control both U.S. Senate seats, all but two statewide executive offices, supermajorities in both houses of the Kentucky General Assembly, and all but one seat in Kentucky's U.S. House delegation. Democrats control both the governorship and lieutenant-governorship, which flipped from Republican control in 2019.

McConnell was first elected in 1984, defeating then-incumbent Walter Dee Huddleston, and was re-elected in six subsequent elections.

== Republican primary ==
=== Candidates ===
==== Nominee ====
- Andy Barr, U.S. representative from Kentucky's 6th congressional district (2013–present)

==== Eliminated in primary ====
- Daniel Cameron, former Kentucky attorney general (2019–2024) and nominee for governor in 2023
- Anissa Catlett, sourcing supply chain manager
- James D. Duncan, professional farrier
- Michael Faris, helicopter maintenance business owner
- Valerie Fredrick, medical doctor, farmer and candidate for U.S. Senate in 2022
- Jonathan M. Holliday, veteran and former Lexington police officer
- Jimmy I. Leon, veteran and educator
- Andrew "Nick" Shelley, volunteer firefighter
- George Washington, filmmaker
- Donald Wenzel, businessman

==== Withdrawn ====
- Nate Morris, business conglomerate owner (endorsed Barr)

==== Declined ====
- James Comer, U.S. representative for Kentucky's 1st congressional district (2016–present) (running for re-election)
- Mitch McConnell, incumbent U.S. senator (1985–present)
- David Osborne, speaker of the Kentucky House of Representatives (2018–present) from the 59th district (2005–present)
- Damon Thayer, former state senator from the 17th district (2003–2025)
- Thomas Massie, U.S. representative for Kentucky's 4th congressional district (2012–present) (ran unsuccessfully for re-election)

=== Endorsements ===
Andy Barr

Executive branch officials

- Donald Trump, president of the United States (2017–2021, 2025–present)
- Markwayne Mullin, U.S. secretary of homeland security (2026–present)
- Kelly Craft, former U.S. ambassador to the United Nations (2019–2021)

U.S. senators

- John Thune, Senate majority leader (2025–present) from South Dakota (2005–present)
- Ted Budd, North Carolina (2023–present)
- Tom Cotton, Arkansas (2015–present)
- Tim Scott, South Carolina (2013–present)

U.S. representatives

- Steve Scalise, House majority leader (2023–present) from LA-01 (2008–present)
- 120 other U.S. representatives (Note: Robert Aderholt, AL-04 (1997–present); Mark Alford, MO-04 (2023–present); Rick Allen, GA-12 (2015–present); Jodey Arrington, TX-19 (2017–present); Brian Babin, TX-36 (2015–present); Jim Baird, IN-04 (2019–present); Troy Balderson, OH-12 (2018–present); Aaron Bean, FL-04 (2023–present); Jack Bergman, MI-01 (2017–present); Gus Bilirakis, FL-12 (2015–present); Vern Buchanan, FL-16 (2007–present); Tim Burchett, TN-02 (2019–present); Ken Calvert, CA-41 (1993–present); Mike Carey, OH-15 (2021–present); John Carter, TX-31 (2003–present); Juan Ciscomani, AZ-06 (2023–present); Ben Cline, VA-06 (2019–present); Mario Díaz-Balart, FL-26 (2003–present); Troy Downing, MT-02 (2025–present); Neal Dunn, FL-02 (2017–present); Jake Ellzey, TX-06 (2021–present); Ron Estes, KS-04 (2017–present); Pat Fallon, TX-04 (2021–present); Randy Fine, FL-06 (2025–present); Michelle Fischbach, MN-07 (2021–present); Scott Fitzgerald, WI-05 (2021–present); Chuck Fleischmann, TN-03 (2011–present); Mike Flood, NE-01 (2022–present); Vince Fong, CA-20 (2024–present); Russell Fry, SC-07 (2023–present); Russ Fulcher, ID-01 (2019–present); Andrew Garbarino, NY-02 (2021–present); Carlos A. Giménez, FL-23 (2021–present); Craig Goldman, TX-12 (2025–present); Sam Graves, MO-06 (2001–present); Glenn Grothman, WI-06 (2015–present); Michael Guest, MS-03 (2019–present); Brett Guthrie, KY-02 (2009–present); Mike Haridopolos, FL-08 (2025–present); Pat Harrigan, NC-10 (2025–present); Diana Harshbarger, TN-01 (2021–present); Kevin Hern, OK-01 (2018–present); French Hill, AR-02 (2015–present); Ashley Hinson, IA-02 (2021–present); Bill Huizenga, MI-04 (2011–present); Jeff Hurd, CO-03 (2025–present); Darrell Issa, CA-48 (2021–present); Ronny Jackson, TX-13 (2021–present); David Joyce, OH-14 (2013–present); Thomas Kean Jr., NJ-07 (2023–present); Mike Kelly, PA-16 (2011–present); Trent Kelly, MS-01 (2015–present); Brad Knott, NC-13 (2025–present); Darin LaHood, IL-16 (2015–present); Nick Langworthy, NY-23 (2023–present); Bob Latta, OH-05 (2007–present); Mike Lawler, NY-17 (2023–present); Laurel Lee, FL-15 (2023–present); Julia Letlow, LA-05 (2021–present); Morgan Luttrell, TX-08 (2023–present); Ryan Mackenzie, PA-07 (2025–present); Nicole Malliotakis, NY-11 (2021–present); Brian Mast, FL-21 (2017–present); Michael McCaul, TX-10 (2005–present); Rich McCormick, GA-06 (2023–present); John McGuire, VA-05 (2025–present); Mark Messmer, IN-08 (2025–present); Dan Meuser, PA-09 (2019–present); Carol Miller, WV-01 (2019–present); Mary Miller, IL-15 (2021–present); Max Miller, OH-07 (2023–present); Blake Moore, UT-01 (2021–present); Tim Moore, NC-14 (2025–present); Nathaniel Moran, TX-01 (2023–present); Greg Murphy, NC-03 (2019–present); Troy Nehls, TX-22 (2021–present); Ralph Norman, SC-05 (2017–present); Zach Nunn, IA-03 (2023–present); Jay Obernolte, CA-23 (2021–present); Burgess Owens, UT-04 (2021–present); Gary Palmer, AL-06 (2015–present); Jimmy Patronis, FL-01 (2025–present); August Pfluger, TX-11 (2021–present); Hal Rogers, KY-05 (1981–present); Mike Rogers, AL-03 (2003–present); David Rouzer, NC-07 (2015–present); John Rutherford, FL-05 (2017–present); María Elvira Salazar, FL-27 (2021–present); David Schweikert, AZ-01 (2011–present); Austin Scott, GA-08 (2011–present); Pete Sessions, TX-21 (2021–present); Jefferson Shreve, IN-06 (2025–present); Adrian Smith, NE-03 (2007–present); Lloyd Smucker, PA-11 (2017–present); Pete Stauber, MN-08 (2019–present); Bryan Steil, WI-01 (2019–present); Elise Stefanik, NY-21 (2015–present); Greg Steube, FL-17 (2019–present); Dale Strong, AL-05 (2023–present); Marlin Stutzman, IN-03 (2010–2017, 2025–present); Claudia Tenney, NY-24 (2023–present); Glenn Thompson, PA-15 (2009–present); William Timmons, SC-04 (2019–present); Matt Van Epps, TN-07 (2025–present); Jeff Van Drew, NJ-02 (2019–present); Derrick Van Orden, WI-03 (2023–present); Tim Walberg, MI-05 (2023–present); Ann Wagner, MO-02 (2013–present); Randy Weber, TX-14 (2013–present); Bruce Westerman, AR-04 (2015–present); Roger Williams, TX-25 (2013–present); Joe Wilson, SC-02 (2001–present); Rob Wittman, VA-01 (2007–present); Steve Womack, AR-03 (2011–present); Ryan Zinke, MT-01 (2023–present))

State legislators

- Mike Wilson, majority whip of the Kentucky Senate from SD-32 (2011–present)
- Max Wise, majority leader of the Kentucky Senate (2025–present) from SD-16 (2015–present)
- David Meade, speaker pro tempore of the Kentucky House of Representatives (2019–present) from HD-80 (2013–present)
- Amanda Mays Bledsoe, SD-12 (2023–present)
- Greg Elkins, SD-28 (2023–present)
- Scott Madon, SD-29 (2025–present)
- Phillip Wheeler, SD-31 (2019–present)
- Kim King, HD-55 (2011–present)
- Damon Thayer, former majority leader of the Kentucky Senate from SD-17 (2013–2025)
- Killian Timoney, former HD-45 (2021–2025)

Individuals

- Joe Craft, businessman
- Riley Gaines, conservative activist and former swimmer
- Nate Morris, businessman

Organizations

- AIPAC
- National Republican Senatorial Committee
- U.S. Chamber of Commerce
Daniel Cameron

State legislators

- Savannah Maddox, HD-61 (2019–present)
- T. J. Roberts, HD-66 (2025–present)
- Gex Williams, SD-24 (1993–1999) and SD-20 (2023–present)

Organizations

- Kentucky Right to Life
- Students for Life of America
Michael Faris

Organizations

- Anti-Zionist America PAC
Nate Morris (withdrawn)

Executive branch officials

- Steve Bannon, former senior counselor to the President (2017)
- Elon Musk, former senior advisor to the President (2025) (Independent)

U.S. senators

- Jim Banks, Indiana (2025–present)
- Bernie Moreno, Ohio (2025–present)

State legislators

- John Hodgson, HD-36 (2022–present)

Individuals

- Benny Johnson, conservative commentator
- Charlie Kirk, founder of Turning Point Action (deceased)
- Vivek Ramaswamy, former CEO of Roivant Sciences

Organizations

- Conservative Political Action Conference
- Republicans for National Renewal
- Senate Conservatives Fund
- Turning Point Action
Declined to endorse

U.S. representatives

- Randy Feenstra, IA-04 (2021–present)
- Tony Wied, WI-08 (2024–present)

=== Fundraising ===
Italics indicate a withdrawn candidate.

Campaign finance reports as of June 30, 2026
| Candidate | Raised | Spent | Cash on hand |
|---|---|---|---|
| Andy Barr (R) | $8,403,849 | $9,649,131 | $2,447,795 |
| Daniel Cameron (R) | $2,154,476 | $2,072,058 | $82,418 |
| Michael Faris (R) | $61,529 | $78,371 | $0 |
| Nate Morris (R) | $8,592,132 (Note: $6,301,500 of this total was self-funded by Morris.) | $7,883,807 | $708,324 |
| Donald Wenzel (R) | $2,431 | $2,431 | $0 |
Source: Federal Election Commission

=== Polling ===
Aggregate polls

| Source of poll aggregation | Dates administered | Dates updated | Andy Barr | Daniel Cameron | Nate Morris | Other/ Undecided (Note: Calculated by taking the difference of 100% and all other candidates combined.) | Margin |
|---|---|---|---|---|---|---|---|
| Decision Desk HQ | through May 11, 2026 | May 17, 2026 | 37.1% | 27.3% | 10.1% | 25.5% | Barr +9.8% |
| FiftyPlusOne | through May 11, 2026 | May 17, 2026 | 44.1% | 25.4% | 8.6% | 21.9% | Barr +18.7% |
| Average | | | 40.6% | 26.4% | 9.4% | 23.6% | Barr +14.2% |

| Poll source | Date(s) administered | Sample size (Note: Key: A – all adults RV – registered voters LV – likely voters V – unclear) | Margin of error | Andy Barr | Daniel Cameron | Nate Morris | Other | Undecided |
|---|---|---|---|---|---|---|---|---|
| UpONE Insights (R) (Note: Poll sponsored by Barr's campaign) | May 9–11, 2026 | 600 (LV) | ± 4.0% | 46% | 27% | 8% | 3% (Note: Michael Farris with 3%) | 16% |
| Public Opinion Strategies (R) (Note: Poll sponsored by Keep America Great, a Barr-aligned super PAC) | May 3–5, 2026 | 600 (LV) | ± 4.0% | 43% | 24% | 9% | 5% (Note: Michael Farris with 5%) | 19% |
| | May 1, 2026 | Trump endorses Barr, Morris withdraws from the race and endorses Barr | | | | | | |
| UpONE Insights (R) | April 2026 | – (LV) | – | 33% | 32% | 13% | 5% | 17% |
| Emerson College (Note: Poll sponsored by WDKY-TV and Nexstar Media) | March 29–31, 2026 | 549 (LV) | ± 4.1% | 28% | 21% | 15% | 6% (Note: Michael Farris with 3%; "Someone else" & Wendy Kennedy with 1%; Andrew Shelley with <1%) | 29% |
| Public Opinion Strategies (R) | March 10–12, 2026 | 600 (LV) | ± 4.0% | 29% | 31% | 13% | – | 27% |
| UpONE Insights (R) | March 2026 | – (LV) | – | 26% | 42% | 12% | – | 20% |
| Quantus Insights (R) | February 4, 2026 | 870 (LV) | ± 3.3% | 28% | 27% | 17% | 9% (Note: "Another candidate" with 9%) | 19% |
| Emerson College (Note: Poll sponsored by Nexstar Media) | January 31 – February 2, 2026 | 523 (LV) | ± 4.2% | 24% | 21% | 14% | 4% (Note: Michael Faris with 2%; Andrew Shelley and Wende Kennedy with 1%) | 37% |
| UpONE Insights (R) | February 2026 | – (LV) | – | 29% | 33% | 12% | – | 26% |
| Fabrizio, Lee & Associates (R) (Note: Poll sponsored by Morris's campaign) | January 27–29, 2026 | 800 (LV) | ± 3.5% | 21% | 29% | 18% | – | 32% |
| OnMessage Inc. (R) (Note: Poll commissioned by Kentucky First Action, a Cameron-aligned super PAC) | January 5–8, 2026 | 600 (LV) | ± 4.0% | 25% | 40% | 13% | – | 22% |
| UpONE Insights (R) | January 2026 | – (LV) | – | 27% | 42% | 11% | – | 20% |
| UpOne Insights (R) | October 13–14, 2025 | 600 (LV) | ± 4.0% | 25% | 42% | 10% | – | 23% |
| co/efficient (R) (Note: Poll commissioned by Cameron's campaign) | October 8–10, 2025 | 911 (LV) | ± 3.2% | 22% | 39% | 8% | 4% (Note: "Someone else" with 4%) | 27% |
| Public Opinion Strategies (R) | September 2–4, 2025 | 600 (LV) | ± 4.0% | 29% | 37% | 8% | – | 26% |
| Fabrizio, Lee & Associates (R) | August 2025 | – (V) | – | 17% | 40% | 5% | – | 38% |
| UpOne Insights (R) | August 2025 | – (V) | – | 19% | 39% | 10% | – | 32% |
| McLaughlin & Associates (R) | April 13–15, 2025 | 500 (LV) | ± 4.5% | 18% | 44% | 2% | – | 36% |
| UpONE Insights (R) | March 2025 | – (LV) | – | 21% | 51% | 3% | – | 25% |
| co/efficient (R) | February 25–26, 2025 | 1,134 (LV) | ± 3.1% | 18% | 39% | 3% | 11% (Note: "Someone else" with 11%) | 31% |
| UpOne Insights (R) | Mid–February 2025 | – (V) | – | 19% | 47% | 3% | – | 31% |
| co/efficient (R) | December 2–3, 2024 | 1,298 (LV) | ± 3.1% | 12% | 37% | 1% | 14% (Note: Kelly Craft with 6%; "Other" with 8%) | 36% |

Hypothetical polling

| Poll source | Date(s) administered | Sample size | Margin of error | Andy Barr | Daniel Cameron | Kelly Craft | Thomas Massie | Nate Morris | Undecided |
|---|---|---|---|---|---|---|---|---|---|
| co/efficient (R) | December 2–3, 2024 | 1,298 (LV) | ± 3.1% | 10% | 32% | 3% | 16% | 0% | 39% |

=== Results ===
Republican primary results by county: Barr: 40–50%; 50–60%; 60–70%; 70–80%; Cameron: 40–50%; 50–60%

Republican primary results
| Party | Candidate | Votes | % |
|---|---|---|---|
| Republican | Andy Barr | 283,833 | 60.5 |
| Republican | Daniel Cameron | 144,592 | 30.8 |
| Republican | Michael James Faris | 11,219 | 2.4 |
| Republican | George Washington | 7,190 | 1.5 |
| Republican | Valerie "Dr Val" Fredrick | 5,267 | 1.1 |
| Republican | Anissa Catlett | 4,892 | 1.0 |
| Republican | James D. Duncan | 3,773 | 0.8 |
| Republican | Jonathan M. Holliday | 3,757 | 0.8 |
| Republican | A. Nick Shelley | 2,771 | 0.6 |
| Republican | Other Donald Wenzel | 1,014 | 0.2 |
| Republican | Jimmy I. Leon | 864 | 0.2 |
| Total votes | | 469,172 | 100.0 |

== Democratic primary ==
=== Candidates ===
==== Nominee ====
- Charles Booker, former state representative (2019–2021), nominee for U.S. Senate in 2022 and candidate in 2020

==== Eliminated in primary ====
- Joshua Blanton Sr., U.S. Army veteran
- Logan Forsythe, attorney
- Amy McGrath, member of the U.S. Naval Academy Board of Visitors (2022–present), nominee for U.S. Senate in 2020, and nominee for Kentucky's 6th congressional district in 2018
- Dale Romans, horse trainer
- Pamela Stevenson, minority leader of the Kentucky House of Representatives (2025–present) from the 43rd district (2021–present) and nominee for Attorney General in 2023
- Vincent Thompson, farmer

==== Withdrawn ====
- Joel Willett, defense contractor

==== Declined ====
- Andy Beshear, governor of Kentucky (2019–present)
- Jacqueline Coleman, lieutenant governor of Kentucky (2019–present) (running for governor in 2027)

=== Endorsements ===
Charles Booker

Executive branch officials

- Barack Obama, 44th president of the United States (2009–2017)
- Deval Patrick, former governor of Massachusetts (2007–2015) and U.S. assistant attorney general for civil rights (1994–1997)

U.S. representatives

- John Yarmuth, former KY-3 (2007–2023)

Labor unions

- AFL-CIO Kentucky
- Communications Workers of America Kentucky
- International Brotherhood of Electrical Workers

Organizations

- Our Revolution
- Track AIPAC

Political parties

- Working Families Party
Amy McGrath

Newspapers

- Lexington Herald-Leader
Dale Romans

Individuals

- James Carville, political consultant

=== Fundraising ===
Campaign finance reports as of March 30, 2026
| Candidate | Raised | Spent | Cash on hand |
|---|---|---|---|
| Charles Booker (D) | $368,365 | $170,265 | $198,100 |
| Logan Forsythe (D) (Note: As of April 17, 2026, the most recent report is dated December 31, 2025.) | $46,938 | $43,805 | $3,133 |
| Amy McGrath (D) | $1,942,704 | $1,631,150 | $311,554 |
| Dale Romans (D) | $821,111 | $380,233 | $440,878 |
| Pamela Stevenson (D) (Note: As of April 17, 2026, the most recent report is dated September 30, 2025.) | $266,963 | $242,099 | $24,864 |
| Joel Willett (D) | $350,036 | $321,249 | $28,787 |
Source: Federal Election Commission

=== Polling ===
| Poll source | Date(s) administered | Sample size | Margin of error | Charles Booker | Logan Forsythe | Amy McGrath | Pamela Stevenson | Joel Willett | Other | Undecided |
|---|---|---|---|---|---|---|---|---|---|---|
| Emerson College | March 29–31, 2026 | 400 (LV) | ± 4.9% | 36% | — | 18% | 3% | — | — | 38% |
| Emerson College | January 31 – February 2, 2026 | 523 (LV) | ± 4.2% | 30% | 1% | 19% | 4% | — | 3% (Note: Vincent Thompson with 2%; Dale Romans with 1%) | 43% |
| Public Policy Polling (D) | October 17–18, 2025 | 590 (LV) | ± 4.0% | 33% | 2% | 30% | 3% | 1% | — | 31% |

=== Results ===
Democratic primary results by county Booker: 30–40%; 40–50%; 50–60%; McGrath: 30–40%; 40–50%; 50–60%

Democratic primary results
| Party | Candidate | Votes | % |
|---|---|---|---|
| Democratic | Charles Booker | 155,577 | 46.8 |
| Democratic | Amy McGrath | 119,296 | 35.9 |
| Democratic | Pamela Stevenson | 20,610 | 6.2 |
| Democratic | Dale Lewis Romans | 13,696 | 4.1 |
| Democratic | Logan Forsythe | 9,648 | 2.9 |
| Democratic | Vincent Anthony Thompson | 6,962 | 2.1 |
| Democratic | Joshua Blanton Sr. | 6,948 | 2.1 |
| Total votes | | 332,737 | 100.0 |

== Third-party and independents ==
=== Candidates ===
- Christopher Todd Campbell (Kentucky Party)
- Thomas Michael Murphy (Write-in)

== General election ==
=== Predictions ===
| Source | Ranking | As of |
|---|---|---|
| The Cook Political Report | Solid R | November 2, 2026 |
| Decision Desk HQ | Likely R | November 3, 2026 |
| The Economist (Note: The Economist's prediction model uses unconventional terminology. For the purpose of equivalency, their "Very Likely" ratings are formatted as a "Likely" rating while "Likely" ratings are formatted as a "Lean" rating.) | Safe R | November 3, 2026 |
| FiftyPlusOne | Safe R | November 3, 2026 |
| Fox News | Solid R | November 1, 2026 |
| Inside Elections | Solid R | October 29, 2026 |
| MS NOW | Safe R | October 29, 2026 |
| NBC News | Solid R | November 3, 2026 |
| RealClearPolitics | Solid R | November 2, 2026 |
| Sabato's Crystal Ball | Safe R | November 2, 2026 |
| Silver Bulletin | Solid R | November 3, 2026 |
| Split Ticket | Safe R | November 2, 2026 |

=== Post-primary endorsements ===
Charles Booker (D)

Executive branch officials

- Barack Obama, former president of the United States (2009–2017)

U.S. senators

- Elizabeth Warren, Massachusetts (2013–present)

Statewide officials

- Andy Beshear, governor of Kentucky (2019–present)
- Jacqueline Coleman, lieutenant governor of Kentucky (2019–present)

=== Fundraising ===
Campaign finance reports as of October 14, 2026
| Candidate | Raised | Spent | Cash on hand |
|---|---|---|---|
| Andy Barr (R) | $12,541,350 | $14,680,571 | $1,553,857 |
| Charles Booker (D) | $1,936,324 | $1,632,725 | $303,599 |
Source: Federal Election Commission

=== Polling ===
| Poll source | Date(s) administered | Sample size | Margin of error | Andy Barr (R) | Charles Booker (D) | Undecided |
|---|---|---|---|---|---|---|
| Global Strategy Group (D) (Note: Poll sponsored by Booker's campaign) | August 24–27, 2026 | 600 (LV) | ± 4.0% | 49% | 40% | 11% |
| Public Policy Polling (D) | December 18–19, 2025 | 650 (V) | — | 49% | 38% | 13% |

Hypothetical polling

Daniel Cameron vs. Charles Booker

| Poll source | Date(s) administered | Sample size | Margin of error | Daniel Cameron (R) | Charles Booker (D) | Undecided |
|---|---|---|---|---|---|---|
| Public Policy Polling (D) | December 18–19, 2025 | 650 (V) | – | 46% | 39% | 15% |

Nate Morris vs. Charles Booker

| Poll source | Date(s) administered | Sample size | Margin of error | Nate Morris (R) | Charles Booker (D) | Undecided |
|---|---|---|---|---|---|---|
| Public Policy Polling (D) | December 18–19, 2025 | 650 (V) | – | 41% | 40% | 19% |

Generic Republican vs. Charles Booker

| Poll source | Date(s) administered | Sample size | Margin of error | Generic Republican | Charles Booker (D) | Undecided |
|---|---|---|---|---|---|---|
| Public Policy Polling (D) | December 18–19, 2025 | 650 (V) | – | 50% | 36% | 14% |

Generic Republican vs. Amy McGrath

| Poll source | Date(s) administered | Sample size | Margin of error | Generic Republican | Amy McGrath (D) | Undecided |
|---|---|---|---|---|---|---|
| Public Policy Polling (D) | December 18–19, 2025 | 650 (V) | – | 51% | 35% | 14% |

=== Results ===
2026 United States Senate election in Kentucky
| Party | Candidate | Votes | % | ±% |
|---|---|---|---|---|
| Republican | Andy Barr | 784,869 | 54.99 | −2.78 |
| Democratic | Charles Booker | 612,357 | 42.90 | +4.67 |
| Kentucky | Christopher Campbell | 29,892 | 2.09 | N/A |
| Write-in | | 158 | 0.01 | N/A |
| Total votes | | 1,427,276 | 100.0 | N/A |
| Republican hold | | | | |

== Notes ==
Partisan clients
