= Kentucky's 43rd House of Representatives district =

American legislative district

Kentucky's 43rd State House of Representatives district
Representative
Pamela Stevenson; D–Louisville
since January 1, 2021
- Registration: 71.5% Democratic; 15.2% Republican; 12.5% No party preference
- Demographics: 43.3% White; 45.6% Black; 3.7% Hispanic; 1.3% Asian; 0.4% Native American; 0.6% Other; 5.1% Multiracial
- Population (2024): 44,172
- Registered voters (2026): 34,494

Kentucky's 43rd House of Representatives district is one of 100 districts in the Kentucky House of Representatives. It comprises part of Jefferson County. It has been represented by Pamela Stevenson (D–Louisville) since 2021. As of 2024, the district had a population of 44,172.

== Voter registration ==
On January 1, 2026, the district had 34,494 registered voters, who were registered with the following parties.

Party	Registration	
Party	Voters	%
Democratic	24,678	71.54
Republican	5,254	15.23
Independent	1,779	5.16
Libertarian	167	0.48
Green	42	0.12
Socialist Workers	24	0.07
Constitution	10	0.03
Reform	6	0.02
"Other"	2,534	7.35
Total	34,494	100.00

== List of members representing the district ==
Member	Party	Years	Electoral history	District location
Norbert Blume (Louisville)	Democratic	January 1, 1964 – January 1, 1978	Elected in 1963. Reelected in 1965. Reelected in 1967. Reelected in 1969. Reelected in 1971. Reelected in 1973. Reelected in 1975. Lost renomination.	1964–1972; Jefferson County (part).
Norbert Blume (Louisville)	Democratic	January 1, 1964 – January 1, 1978	Elected in 1963. Reelected in 1965. Reelected in 1967. Reelected in 1969. Reelected in 1971. Reelected in 1973. Reelected in 1975. Lost renomination.	1972–1974; Jefferson County (part).
Norbert Blume (Louisville)	Democratic	January 1, 1964 – January 1, 1978	Elected in 1963. Reelected in 1965. Reelected in 1967. Reelected in 1969. Reelected in 1971. Reelected in 1973. Reelected in 1975. Lost renomination.	1974–1985; Jefferson County (part).
Carl Hines (Louisville)	Democratic	January 1, 1978 – January 1, 1987	Elected in 1977. Reelected in 1979. Reelected in 1981. Reelected in 1984. Lost renomination.	1974–1985; Jefferson County (part).
Carl Hines (Louisville)	Democratic	January 1, 1978 – January 1, 1987	Elected in 1977. Reelected in 1979. Reelected in 1981. Reelected in 1984. Lost renomination.	1985–1993; Jefferson County (part).
E. Porter Hatcher Jr. (Louisville)	Democratic	January 1, 1987 – December 1999	Elected in 1986. Reelected in 1988. Reelected in 1990. Reelected in 1992. Reelected in 1994. Reelected in 1996. Reelected in 1998. Resigned.	1985–1993; Jefferson County (part).
E. Porter Hatcher Jr. (Louisville)	Democratic	January 1, 1987 – December 1999	Elected in 1986. Reelected in 1988. Reelected in 1990. Reelected in 1992. Reelected in 1994. Reelected in 1996. Reelected in 1998. Resigned.	1993–1997; Jefferson County (part).
E. Porter Hatcher Jr. (Louisville)	Democratic	January 1, 1987 – December 1999	Elected in 1986. Reelected in 1988. Reelected in 1990. Reelected in 1992. Reelected in 1994. Reelected in 1996. Reelected in 1998. Resigned.	1997–2003
Paul Bather (Louisville)	Democratic	January 24, 2000 – January 1, 2005	Elected to finish Hatcher's term. Reelected in 2000. Reelected in 2002. Retired.	1997–2003
Paul Bather (Louisville)	Democratic	January 24, 2000 – January 1, 2005	Elected to finish Hatcher's term. Reelected in 2000. Reelected in 2002. Retired.	2003–2015
Darryl Owens (Louisville)	Democratic	January 1, 2005 – January 1, 2019	Elected in 2004. Reelected in 2006. Reelected in 2008. Reelected in 2010. Reelected in 2012. Reelected in 2014. Reelected in 2016. Retired.	2003–2015
Darryl Owens (Louisville)	Democratic	January 1, 2005 – January 1, 2019	Elected in 2004. Reelected in 2006. Reelected in 2008. Reelected in 2010. Reelected in 2012. Reelected in 2014. Reelected in 2016. Retired.	2015–2023
Charles Booker (Louisville)	Democratic	January 1, 2019 – January 1, 2021	Elected in 2018. Retired to run for the United States Senate.	2015–2023
Pamela Stevenson (Louisville)	Democratic	January 1, 2021 – present	Elected in 2020. Reelected in 2022. Reelected in 2024. Retired to run for the United States Senate.	2015–2023
Pamela Stevenson (Louisville)	Democratic	January 1, 2021 – present	Elected in 2020. Reelected in 2022. Reelected in 2024. Retired to run for the United States Senate.	2023–present
Robert LeVertis Bell (Louisville)	Democratic	Assuming office January 1, 2027	Elected in 2026.	2023–present
