= 2022 United States Senate election in Kentucky =

- November 8, 2022
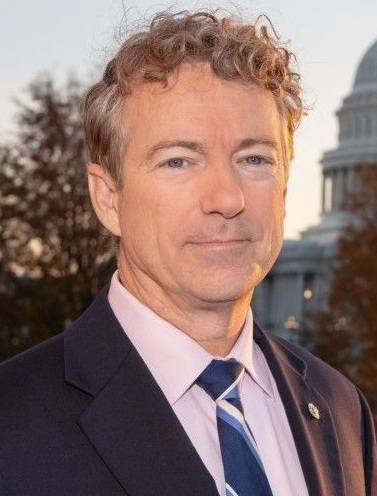

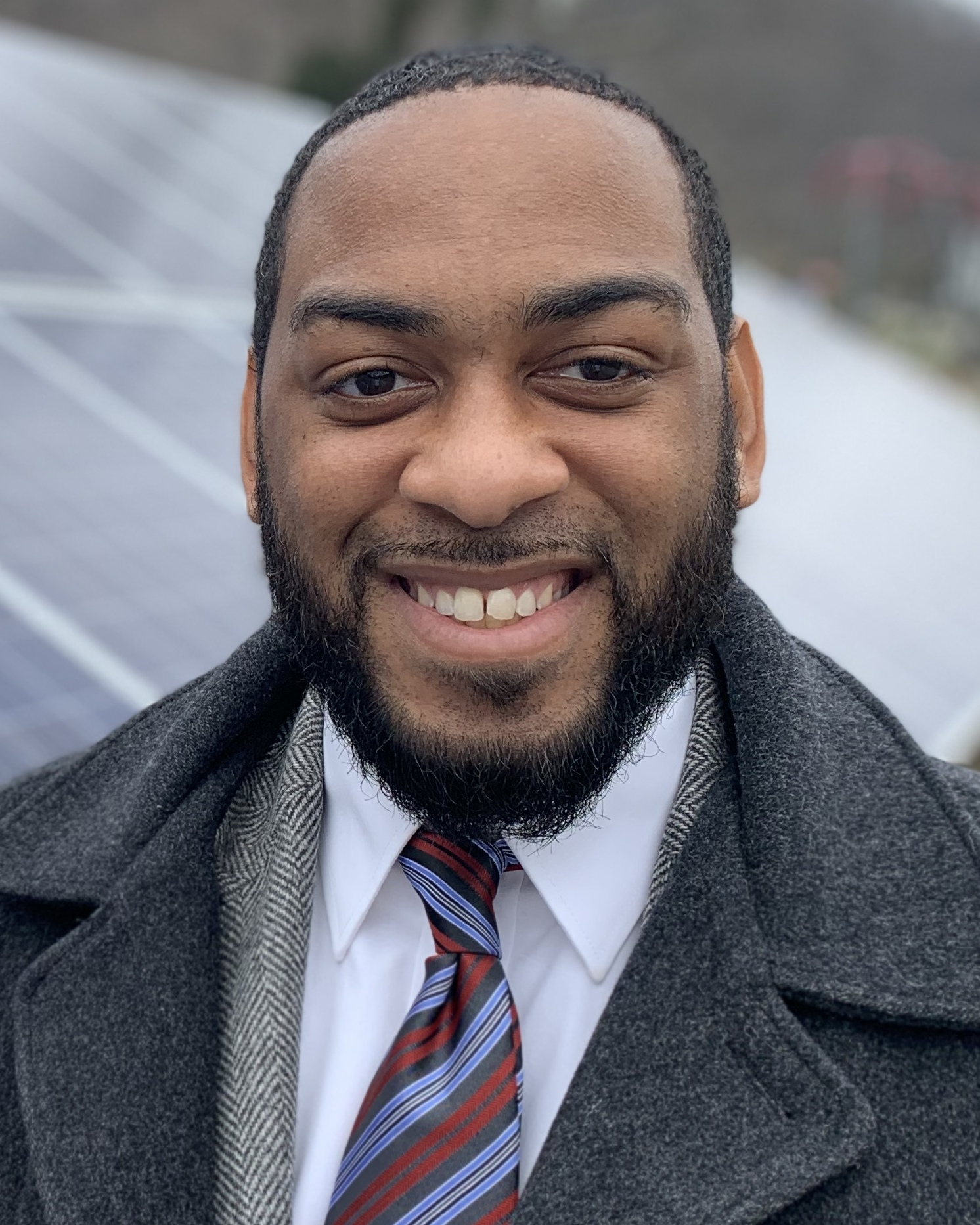
Nominee	Rand Paul	Charles Booker
Party	Republican	Democratic
Popular vote	913,326	564,311
Percentage	61.80%	38.19%
- Paul: 50–60% 60–70% 70–80% 80–90% Booker: 50–60% 60–70%
U.S. senator before election
Rand Paul
Republican
Elected U.S. Senator
Rand Paul
Republican

The 2022 United States Senate election in Kentucky was held on November 8, 2022, to elect a member of the United States Senate to represent Kentucky. Incumbent Republican Rand Paul won re-election to a third term, defeating Democratic nominee Charles Booker with 61.8% of the vote.

Paul was first elected in 2010 with 55.7% of the vote, filling the seat of retiring Jim Bunning, then re-elected in 2016 with 57.3% of the vote. Paul ran for a third term. Booker is a former state representative, and was a candidate in the Democratic primary for the U.S. Senate in 2020. The election was called for Paul shortly after polls closed in the state.

This was the biggest landslide victory for a U.S. Senate race in Kentucky since Mitch McConnell's win in 2002.

== Background ==
Although Rand Paul supported a constitutional amendment limiting senators to two terms, he said, "I'm not in favor of term limits for some and not others. So I'm not in favor of people self-imposing term limits. I'm a co-sponsor of the constitutional amendment, but I will run again in 2022." Kentucky held its primary election on May 17.

== Republican primary ==
=== Candidates ===
==== Nominee ====
- Rand Paul, incumbent U.S. senator

==== Eliminated in primary ====
- Arnold Blankenship, retiree
- Valerie Frederick
- Paul V. Hamilton, economics professor
- John Schiess, perennial candidate
- Tami Stanfield, former sales executive

=== Endorsements ===
Rand Paul

Executive branch officials

- Donald Trump, 45th president of the United States (2017–2021)

Statewide officials

- Allison Ball, Kentucky state treasurer (2016–2024)

Organizations

- Club for Growth
- FreedomWorks
- Turning Point Action

=== Results ===
Results by county: Paul: 70–80%; 80–90%; 90–100%

Republican primary results
Party	Candidate	Votes	%
Republican	Rand Paul (incumbent)	333,051	86.35%
Republican	Valerie Frederick	14,018	3.63%
Republican	Paul V. Hamilton	13,473	3.49%
Republican	Arnold Blankenship	10,092	2.62%
Republican	Tami Stanfield	9,526	2.47%
Republican	John Schiess	5,538	1.44%
Total votes		385,698	100.0%

== Democratic primary ==
=== Candidates ===
==== Nominee ====
- Charles Booker, former state representative (2019–2021) and candidate for U.S. Senate in 2020

==== Eliminated in primary ====
- Joshua Blanton Sr., Army veteran
- Ruth Gao, educator and activist
- John Merrill, chemist and Navy veteran

==== Declined ====
- Rocky Adkins, senior advisor to Governor Andy Beshear, former minority leader of the Kentucky House of Representatives, and candidate for governor in 2019
- Jim Gray, Kentucky secretary of transportation, former mayor of Lexington, KY, nominee for U.S. Senate in 2016 and candidate for Kentucky's 6th congressional district in 2018

=== Endorsements ===
Charles Booker

U.S. senators

- Bernie Sanders, U.S. senator from Vermont (2007–present)
- Elizabeth Warren, U.S. senator from Massachusetts (2013–present)

U.S. representatives

- John Yarmuth, U.S. representative from Kentucky's 3rd congressional district (2007–2023)

Labor unions

- Communications Workers of America – Louisville Chapter
- IUE-CWA – Louisville Chapter
- Kentucky AFL–CIO
- National Education Association

Organizations

- Brand New Congress
- Democracy for America
- Indivisible
- League of Conservation Voters
- March On
- Planned Parenthood Action Fund
- Sunrise Movement
- Working Families Party

Individuals

- Ben Crump, civil rights lawyer

=== Results ===
Results by county: Booker: 40–50%; 50–60%; 60–70%; 70–80%; 80–90%; Blanton: 40–50%

Democratic primary results
Party	Candidate	Votes	%
Democratic	Charles Booker	214,245	73.29
Democratic	Joshua Blanton Sr.	30,980	10.60
Democratic	John Merrill	28,931	9.90
Democratic	Ruth Gao	18,154	6.21
Total votes		292,310	100.0

== General election ==
Although Paul had initially pledged to serve only one term, he later reversed this stance and ran for re-election. In both 2010 and 2016, he faced tight races, even as these years were generally unfavorable for the Democratic Party and Kentucky's conservative partisan lean. Paul had gained a reputation as one of the most libertarian senators and often breaks with his party despite still holding conservative views on most issues.

Following a narrow primary defeat by Amy McGrath in the 2020 Kentucky Senate Democratic primaries, State Representative Charles Booker announced his intention to run again, this time against Paul. Booker positioned himself as a progressive populist, advocating for abortion rights, Universal Basic Income, Medicare for All, and a Green New Deal. He aimed to resonate with traditional Democratic voters in the urban centers of Louisville and Lexington, while also reaching out to ancestral Democrats in Kentucky's Appalachian region.

An early February poll showed Paul leading by only a few points against a generic Democrat. However, a later poll revealed Paul had a substantial lead over Booker. In October, a debate was scheduled to include both Paul and Booker, but Paul did not respond to the invitation, resulting in Booker debating alone.

Paul went on to easily win re-election, improving his 2016 performance by approximately 9 percentage points. However, due to lower voter turnout, he underperformed compared to Trump's 2020 performance in the state by 2 points and received a slightly smaller percentage of the vote.

=== Predictions ===
Source	Ranking	As of
The Cook Political Report	Solid R	November 19, 2021
Inside Elections	Solid R	January 7, 2022
Sabato's Crystal Ball	Safe R	November 3, 2021
Politico	Solid R	October 18, 2022
RCP	Safe R	January 10, 2022
Fox News	Solid R	May 12, 2022
DDHQ	Solid R	July 20, 2022
538	Solid R	June 30, 2022
The Economist	Safe R	September 7, 2022

=== Endorsements ===
Rand Paul (R)

Executive branch officials

- Donald Trump, 45th president of the United States (2017–2021)

U.S. senators

- Mitch McConnell, U.S. senator from Kentucky (1985–present), former Senate minority leader (2021–2025, 2007–2015), and former Senate majority leader (2015–2021)

U.S. representatives

- Andy Barr, U.S. representative from Kentucky's 6th congressional district (2013–present)

Statewide officials

- Allison Ball, Kentucky state treasurer (2016–2024)
- Ryan Quarles, agriculture commissioner of Kentucky (2016–2024)

Sheriffs

- Tracy Beatty, sheriff of Ohio County
- Ed Brady, former sheriff of Ohio County
- Keith Cain, former sheriff of Daviess County (Democratic)
- David Crafton, sheriff of Henderson County (Democratic)
- Ken Frizzell, sheriff of McLean County
- Barry Smith, sheriff of Daviess County

Organizations

- Americans for Legal Immigration
- Campaign for Working Families
- Citizens Against Government Waste
- Club for Growth
- FreedomWorks
- Huck PAC
- Kentucky Fraternal Order of Police
- Kentucky Right to Life
- National Federation of Independent Business - Kentucky chapter
- National Right to Life Committee
- NRA Political Victory Fund
- Senate Conservatives Fund
- Turning Point Action
Charles Booker (D)

U.S. senators

- Cory Booker, U.S. senator from New Jersey (2013–present)
- Bernie Sanders, U.S. senator from Vermont (2007–present)
- Elizabeth Warren, U.S. senator from Massachusetts (2013–present)

U.S. representatives

- John Yarmuth, U.S. representative from Kentucky's 3rd congressional district (2007–2023)

Statewide officials

- Jerry Abramson, former lieutenant governor of Kentucky (2011–2014)
- Andy Beshear, governor of Kentucky (2019–present)
- Martha Layne Collins, former governor of Kentucky (1983–1987)
- Daniel Mongiardo, former lieutenant governor of Kentucky (2007–2011)
- Paul E. Patton, former governor of Kentucky (1995–2003)

Newspapers

- Lexington Herald-Leader

Labor unions

- Communications Workers of America – Louisville Chapter
- IUE-CWA – Louisville Chapter
- Kentucky AFL–CIO
- National Association of Social Workers
- National Education Association
- United Mine Workers of America

Organizations

- Brand New Congress
- Common Defense
- Democracy for America
- End Citizens United
- Everytown for Gun Safety
- Indivisible
- League of Conservation Voters
- LegalizeKY
- March On
- MoveOn
- NARAL Pro-Choice America
- New Power PAC
- Newtown Action Alliance
- Peace Action
- Planned Parenthood Action Fund
- Progressive Turnout Project
- Sierra Club
- Sunrise Movement
- Working Families Party

Individuals

- Ben Crump, civil rights lawyer

=== Polling ===
Poll source	Date(s) administered	Sample size (Note: Key: A – all adults RV – registered voters LV – likely voters V – unclear)	Margin of error	Rand Paul (R)	Charles Booker (D)	Undecided
Mason-Dixon	January 19–22, 2022	625 (RV)	± 4.0%	55%	39%	6%

Hypothetical polling

Rand Paul vs. generic Democrat

Poll source	Date(s) administered	Sample size	Margin of error	Rand Paul (R)	Generic Democrat	Undecided
Mason-Dixon	February 1–4, 2021	625 (RV)	± 4.0%	47%	41%	12%

=== Results ===
2022 United States Senate election in Kentucky
Party	Candidate	Votes	%	±%
Republican	Rand Paul (incumbent)	913,326	61.80%	+4.53%
Democratic	Charles Booker	564,311	38.19%	−4.54%
Write-in		193	0.01%	+0.01%
Total votes		1,477,830	100.0%	N/A
Republican hold				

==== Counties that flipped from Democratic to Republican ====
- Elliott (largest city: Sandy Hook)
- Marion (largest city: Lebanon)
- Nicholas (largest city: Carlisle)
- Rowan (largest city: Morehead)

==== By congressional district ====
Paul won five of six congressional districts.

District	Paul	Booker	Representative
1st	71%	29%	James Comer
2nd	68%	32%	Brett Guthrie
3rd	40%	60%	John Yarmuth (117th Congress)
3rd	40%	60%	Morgan McGarvey (118th Congress)
4th	66%	34%	Thomas Massie
5th	75%	25%	Hal Rogers
6th	54%	46%	Andy Barr

== See also ==
- 2022 United States Senate elections
- 2022 Kentucky elections
