= Pamela Stevenson =

American politician

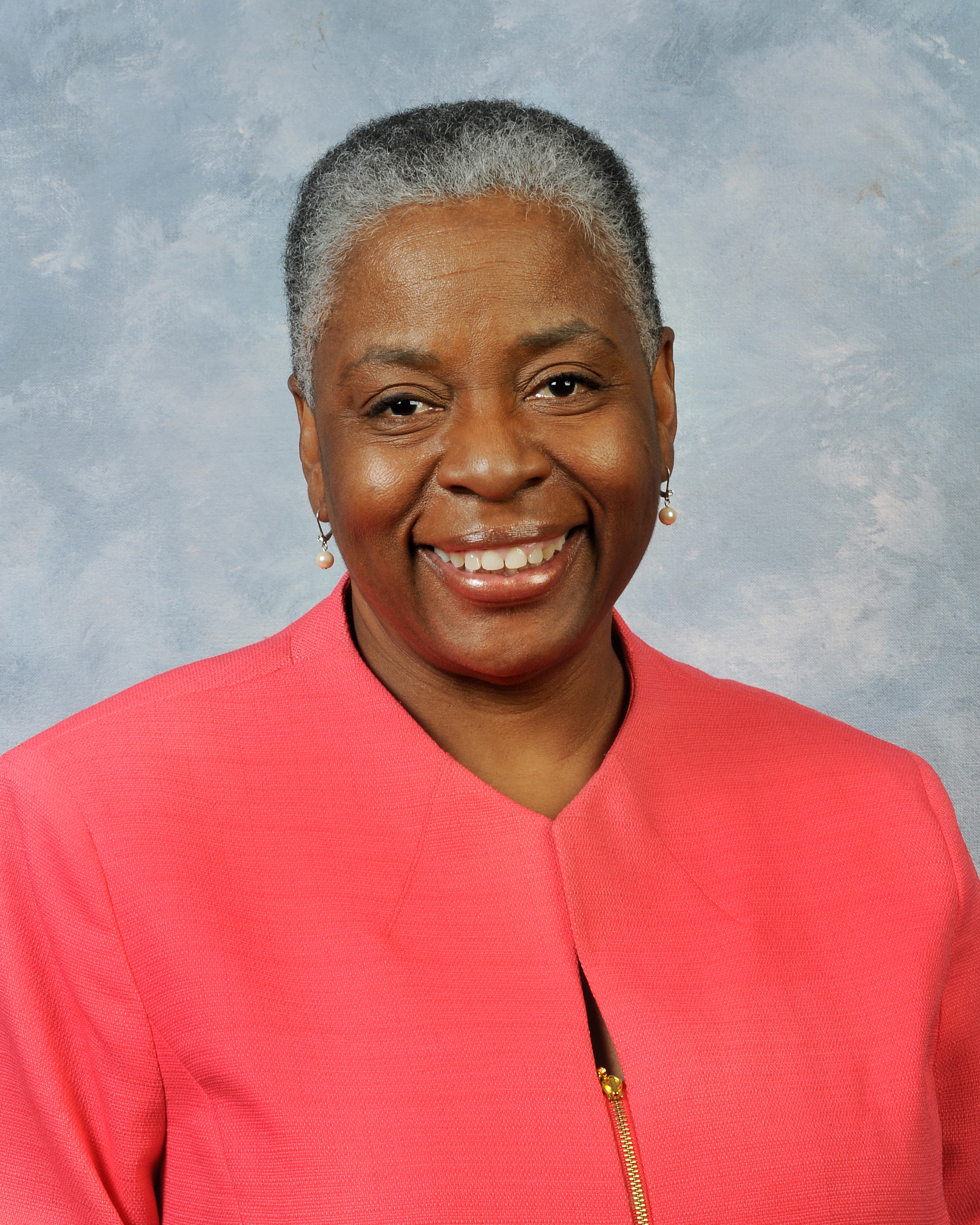
- Official portrait, 2020

Minority Leader of the Kentucky House of Representatives
- Incumbent
- Assumed office January 7, 2025
- Preceded by: Derrick Graham

Member of the Kentucky House of Representatives from the 43rd district
- Incumbent
- Assumed office January 1, 2021
- Preceded by: Charles Booker

Personal details
- Born: April 8, 1959 (age 67) Louisville, Kentucky, U.S.
- Party: Democratic
- Spouse: Thomas Shannon
- Children: 2
- Education: Indiana University, Bloomington (BS, JD)

Military service
- Branch/service: United States Air Force
- Years of service: 1984–2011
- Rank: Colonel
- Unit: United States Air Force Judge Advocate General's Corps

Pamela D. Stevenson (born April 8, 1959) is an American politician, attorney, and retired U.S. Air Force Colonel. She is a Democrat and represents District 43 in the Kentucky State House.

On February 20, 2025, Stevenson launched a campaign in the 2026 United States Senate election in Kentucky, seeking the Democratic nomination to replace retiring seven-term incumbent Republican Mitch McConnell. Stevenson lost the nomination to Charles Booker.

== Early life, education and military career ==
Stevenson was born and raised in Louisville, Kentucky, attending Shawnee High School before transferring to Brown High School. Stevenson graduated with a Bachelor of Science degree in business from Indiana University Bloomington in 1981, and in 1984 with a Doctorate of Jurisprudence from Indiana University Maurer School of Law.

Stevenson served 27 years as a Judge Advocate General with the U.S. Air Force and retired with the rank of colonel.

In 2015, Stevenson founded the Stevenson Law Center, which offers legal representation pro bono to veterans and seniors. Stevenson has served as an adjunct professor at the University of Louisville Brandeis School of Law.

== Kentucky House of Representatives ==
Stevenson was elected to the Kentucky House of Representatives in 2020, replacing Charles Booker, who instead ran for the U.S. Senate.

Stevenson became known for her impassioned speeches. In March 2023, a speech she gave in opposition to the passing of Kentucky House Bill 470, which prohibits gender-affirming care for transgender youth and restricts school instruction on sexual orientation and gender identity, went viral online.

Stevenson made another speech on March 29, 2023, regarding Senate Bill 150 which, like Kentucky House Bill 470, would prohibit all gender-affirming healthcare for transgender people under 18 years of age.

“We have created an environment of hate and then we look at them like there’s something wrong with them, First you hated Black people, then you hated Jews, now you’re hating everybody. So the question is, when it’s the only people left … will you hate yourself?”

== 2023 Attorney General of Kentucky candidacy ==
In November 2022, Stevenson announced her candidacy for Attorney General of Kentucky in 2023. She became the presumptive Democratic nominee after no other candidates filed for the Primary, becoming the first African-American woman nominated for the office in Kentucky.

== 2026 U.S. Senate candidacy ==
On February 20, 2025, following Senator Mitch McConnell's decision not to seek an eighth term, Stevenson announced her intention to run for United States Senator representing the Commonwealth of Kentucky via a post on X.

Stevenson was noted in national press as one of several Black women who ran for US Senate in 2026: including Juliana Stratton and Robin Kelly of Illinois, Jasmine Crockett of Texas, Priscilla Williams Till of Mississippi, and Catherine Fleming Bruce of South Carolina.

== Personal life ==
Stevenson is a Christian, and was ordained as a minister in 2023. She serves as an Associate Pastor at the Oak Grove Missionary Baptist Church, in Louisville.

She is married to Thomas Shannon, a professional photographer. They have two children.

== Electoral history ==
=== 2018 ===
Democratic primary results
Party	Candidate	Votes	%
Democratic	Charles Booker	1,481	29.5
Democratic	Pamela Stevenson	1,104	22.0
Democratic	Phillip "Phil" Baker	929	18.5
Democratic	Mark D. Mitchell	581	11.6
Democratic	Kathleen Parks	507	10.1
Democratic	Jackson Andrews	295	5.9
Democratic	Dre Dawson	116	2.3
Total votes		5,013	100.0

=== 2020 ===
Democratic primary results
Party	Candidate	Votes	%
Democratic	Pamela D. Stevenson	6,320	74.1
Democratic	David L. Snardon	2,214	25.9
Total votes		8,534	100.0

2020 Kentucky House of Representatives 43rd district election
Party	Candidate	Votes	%
Democratic	Pamela D. Stevenson	Unopposed	
Total votes		14,825	100.0
Democratic hold			

=== 2022 ===
Democratic primary results
Party	Candidate	Votes	%
Democratic	Pamela D. Stevenson (incumbent)	2,622	53.8
Democratic	Robert LeVertis Bell	2,255	46.2
Total votes		4,877	100.0

2022 Kentucky House of Representatives 43rd district election
Party	Candidate	Votes	%
Democratic	Pamela D. Stevenson (incumbent)	Unopposed	
Total votes		9,045	100.0
Democratic hold			

=== 2023 ===
2023 Kentucky Attorney General election
Party	Candidate	Votes	%
Republican	Russell Coleman	752,692	58.0
Democratic	Pamela Stevenson	544,748	42.0
Total votes		1,297,440	100.0
Republican hold			

=== 2024 ===
2024 Kentucky House of Representatives 43rd district election
Party	Candidate	Votes	%
Democratic	Pamela Stevenson (incumbent)	Unopposed	
Total votes		12,088	100.0
Democratic hold			

== See also ==
- Female state legislators in the United States
- Black women in American politics

Kentucky House of Representatives
Preceded by Derrick Graham	Minority Leader of the Kentucky House of Representatives; 2025–present	
Party political offices
Preceded by Greg Stumbo	Democratic nominee for Attorney General of Kentucky; 2023	Most recent
