= Darryl Owens =

American politician (1937–2022)

Member of the Kentucky House of Representatives from the 43rd district
- In office January 1, 2005 – January 1, 2019
- Preceded by: Paul Bather
- Succeeded by: Charles Booker

Member of the Jefferson County Commission from District C
- In office January 2, 1984 – February 28, 2003
- Preceded by: Carl Brown
- Succeeded by: David Whitlock

Personal details
- Born: November 10, 1937 Louisville, Kentucky, United States
- Died: January 4, 2022 (aged 84)
- Party: Democratic
- Education: Central State University, Howard University
- Profession: Attorney

Darryl T. Owens (November 10, 1937 – January 4, 2022) was an American politician who was a Democratic Party member of the Kentucky House of Representatives, representing District 43 from 2005 to 2019. Owens retired from the House in 2018. He died on January 4, 2022, at the age of 84.

== Early life and education ==
Owens was born in 1937 in Louisville, Kentucky. He graduated from Central High School in Louisville and earned a bachelor's degree from Central State University in Wilberforce, Ohio. Owen earned a juris doctor degree from Howard University Law School in 1962.

== Career ==
=== Legal ===
Starting in 1965, Owen practiced civil and criminal law in Louisville. From 1965 to 1969, he served as the first African American assistant prosecutor of Louisville police court, and he was the first African American in Kentucky to hold the position of Assistant Attorney General. Owens also served on the Jefferson County Fiscal Court. He also served as a Jefferson County commissioner. He was also the first African American to serve on the fiscal court and county commission in Kentucky.
