= E. Porter Hatcher Jr. =

American politician

Porter Hatcher

Member of the Kentucky House of Representatives from the 43rd district
- In office January 1, 1987 – December 1999
- Preceded by: Carl Hines
- Succeeded by: Paul Bather

Personal details
- Born: September 9, 1936
- Died: December 26, 2012 (aged 76)
- Party: Democratic

Elijah Porter Hatcher Jr. (September 9, 1936 – December 26, 2012) was an American politician.

Hatcher began his career in politics in 1975 winning the alderman's race in Louisville's 12th Ward.

Hatcher represented the 43rd Kentucky House of Representatives District, which comprises West Louisville from 1987 to 1999.

In 2000, Hatcher was indicted for campaign finance and insurance fraud. He ended up pleading guilty and was placed on 5 years of probation which ended his political career.
