= Charles Booker (American politician) =

American politician (born 1984)

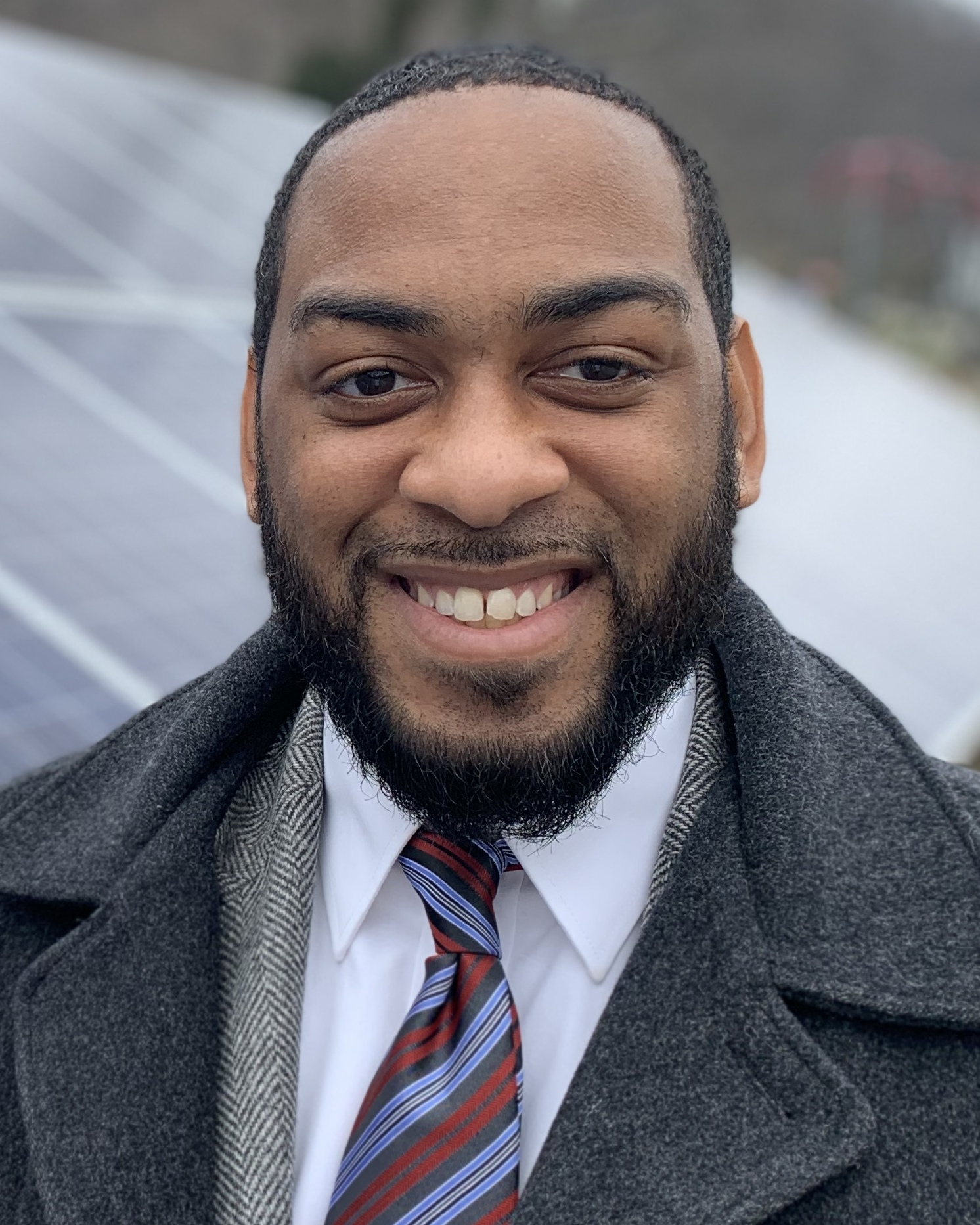
- Booker in 2020

Member of the Kentucky House of Representatives from the 43rd district
- In office January 1, 2019 – January 1, 2021
- Preceded by: Darryl Owens
- Succeeded by: Pamela Stevenson

Personal details
- Born: October 20, 1984 (age 42) Louisville, Kentucky, U.S.
- Party: Democratic
- Children: 3
- Education: University of Louisville (BS, JD)
- Website: Campaign website

Charles Booker Jr. (born October 20, 1984) is an American politician who served from 2019 to 2021 as the Kentucky state representative for the 43rd House district.

Booker previously ran for the Democratic nomination in the 2020 election, drawing national attention before ultimately losing a close race to former Marine fighter pilot Amy McGrath. In April 2021, Booker formed an exploratory committee for the 2022 U.S. Senate race in Kentucky and formally announced that he was running on July 1, 2021. He won the primary on May 17 but lost to Republican incumbent Rand Paul in the general election. Booker is the first African American to be a major party nominee for U.S. Senate in Kentucky. Following his defeat, Booker was appointed by Kentucky Governor Andy Beshear to lead the Governor's Office of Faith-Based Initiatives and Community Involvement. Booker ran again for the Senate in 2026, again winning the Democratic nomation but losing in the general election to Republican Andy Barr, who will succeed retiring incumbent Mitch McConnell.

== Early life and education ==
Booker was born in Louisville, Kentucky, on October 20, 1984, to parents who both dropped out of high school to take care of their siblings. His parents later became ministers. Booker graduated from Louisville Male High School. He earned a Bachelor of Science in political science and Juris Doctor from the University of Louisville. During law school, he interned for U.S. Representative Gregory Meeks.

== Career ==
Booker worked for the Legislative Research Commission until 2014, when he was fired for violating a staff policy against partisan political activity after appearing in a campaign video of Alison Lundergan Grimes, a candidate in the 2014 United States Senate election in Kentucky.

He then worked for the Kentucky Department of Fish and Wildlife Resources and West Louisville FoodPort.

In 2016, he ran against Gerald Neal in the Democratic Party primary election for Kentucky's 33rd Senate district. Booker finished in third place with 20 percent of the vote, behind Neal, who received 48 percent, and Joan Stringer, who received 32 percent.

On January 14, 2023, Booker was appointed as head of the Governor's Office of Faith-Based Initiatives and Community Involvement. Booker later resigned the position on September 24, 2025, to run for Mitch McConnell's senate seat in the 2026 midterms.

== Kentucky House of Representatives ==
Kentucky's 43rd House district in 2018

Following Darryl Owens' retirement from representing Kentucky's 43rd House district in 2018, Booker ran to succeed him. In a field of seven candidates, Booker won the Democratic nomination with 29.5 percent of the vote, and defeated Republican Everett Corley in the general election by 56 percent. Booker became the states youngest Black lawmaker.

During his tenure, Booker worked across the aisle with Republican lawmakers to pass "Kevin's Law", which allowed pharmacists to provide emergency supplies of life-saving medications, such as insulin and inhalers, when prescriptions had expired and the prescribing doctor could not be reached. He also co-sponsored legislation that passed the Kentucky House unanimously in 2020 to cap out-of-pocket insulin costs.

In the Kentucky House of Representatives, Booker served on the economic development and workforce, judiciary, and natural resources and energy committees.

== U.S. Senate campaigns ==
=== 2020 ===
On January 5, 2020, Booker formally entered the 2020 U.S. Senate race in Kentucky. His platform included universal health care, a Green New Deal to tackle climate change, systemic criminal justice reform and universal basic income. During an interview with CNN on June 6, 2020, Booker stated, "we're building a grassroots campaign that has folks working from every part of a commonwealth," and "we've raised over a million dollars from regular folks because they know how important this moment is." As a progressive Democrat, Booker supported the Bernie Sanders 2020 presidential campaign.

Booker received endorsements from nearly half of the Democrats in the Kentucky House of Representatives, celebrities, unions and organizations. He was endorsed by U.S. senators Elizabeth Warren and Bernie Sanders; U.S. representatives Alexandria Ocasio-Cortez and Ayanna Pressley; Tom Steyer; former U.S. secretary of housing and urban development, Julian Castro; Kentucky State Senator Gerald Neal; former Kentucky Secretary of State Alison Lundergan Grimes; actress Susan Sarandon; the Working Families Party; and the Sunrise Movement. The editorial boards of the Lexington Herald-Leader and The Courier Journal, Kentucky's two largest newspapers, also endorsed Booker.

The campaign drew national attention in its closing weeks, as Booker swiftly closed a polling gap with McGrath, and because the winner would challenge the Republican leader in the Senate, Mitch McConnell. His surge came after his participation in protests over the death of Breonna Taylor. However, Booker ultimately lost to Amy McGrath, receiving 42.7% of the vote compared to McGrath's 45.4%. Upon conceding, Booker released a statement, reading in part:

Don't ever let someone tell you what's impossible. Don't ever give up on your dreams for a brighter future. No matter where you are from, what color your skin is, how much money you have, who you love, what pronoun you use, whether you walk or use a wheelchair, or what you believe—you matter. You deserve a government that accounts for your humanity. From this moment on, let's take the frustration we feel and commit to fighting for change like never before. Let's dedicate to the work of beating Mitch, so that we can get him out of the way. Yes, I would love to be your nominee, but know I'm still by your side. Thank you for giving me this opportunity. Kentucky, I love you. From the hood to the holler.

=== 2022 ===
In April 2021, Booker formed an exploratory committee to consider running for Kentucky's other Senate seat. On July 1, 2021, Booker announced he would run in the Democratic primary. In his first fundraising quarter (Q3 2021), he raised $1.7 million from 55,000 individual donations. He stated that "98% of our dollars are from grassroots small donors," and asserted his campaign is therefore funded by everyday people.

On May 17, Booker won the Democratic primary. He became the first African American to be a major party nominee for US Senate in Kentucky. Booker lost to incumbent Republican senator Rand Paul in the general election.

After the election, Governor Andy Beshear appointed Booker on January 13, 2023, to lead the Governor's Office of Faith-Based Initiatives and Community Involvement. He held this office until his resignation on September 24, 2025.

=== 2026 ===
On December 3, 2025, Booker announced that he would run for the open U.S. Senate seat being vacated by Mitch McConnell. On May 19, 2026, Booker won the Democratic primary in a rematch of the 2020 primary, defeating Amy McGrath. He will face Republican nominee Andy Barr in the general election.

== Political positions ==
Booker is considered to be a progressive.

=== Money in politics ===
Booker supports removing money from politics. He said the Citizens United v. FEC court decision should be overturned. Booker supports banning members of Congress from trading individual stocks.

=== Foreign affairs ===
==== Iran war ====
Booker criticized the 2026 Iran war. In February 2026, he said, "The American people do not want war with Iran. Congress did not authorize war with Iran." He criticized Donald Trump's April 2026 post that said a "whole civilization" in Iran would be destroyed.

==== Israel-Palestine ====
Booker said that Israeli actions during the Gaza War constitute genocide.

=== Climate and energy ===
Booker supports a Green New Deal.

=== Healthcare ===
Booker supports single-payer healthcare in the form of Medicare for All.

=== Race ===
Booker has historically supported reparations for slavery, but refrained from making it part of his campaign in 2026. In 2021, Booker ran on supporting reparations and compared it to Kentucky using funds to help families impacted from deindustrialization.

=== Abortion ===
Booker did not support Kentucky's ban on abortion. He supported writing abortion rights into law, but said he understood differing personal beliefs.

=== Crime ===
In Booker's 2021 run for Senate, he faced criticism for his alleged support of de-funding the police. Instead, Booker rarely talked about de-funding the police, and instead criticized increasing police budgets, vying to instead spend that money on things like mental health services.

=== Immigration ===
Booker has called for ICE to be abolished.

=== Income ===
Booker has repeatably supported a universal basic income, and has linked the idea to continuing the fight of Martin Luther King Jr.. In 2026, Booker proposed a "40 for 40 for 45" plan. The plan argues that if someone works 40 hours a week they should be entitled to a minimum of 40 hours of paid sick leave and a minimum income of $45,000.

== Personal life ==
Booker and his ex-wife, Tanesha, have three daughters. He is a Baptist.

Booker has type 1 diabetes, and has said that he had to ration his insulin when he was younger due to the cost.

He is a member of Kappa Alpha Psi, a historically black college fraternity.

== Electoral history ==
=== 2018-2020 ===
Kentucky House of Representatives District 43 election, 2018
Party	Candidate	Votes	%
Democratic	Charles Booker	10,798	76.5%
Republican	Everett Corley	3,005	21.3%
Libertarian	John Hicks	319	2.3%
Total votes		14,122	100.0

United States Senate election in Kentucky Democratic primary, 2020
Party	Candidate	Votes	%
Democratic	Amy McGrath	247,037	45.4%
Democratic	Charles Booker	231,888	42.6%
Democratic	Mike Broihier	27,175	5.0%
Democratic	Mary Ann Tobin	11,108	2.0%
Democratic	Maggie Jo Hilliard	6,224	1.1%
Democratic	Andrew Maynard	5,974	1.1%
Democratic	Bennie Smith	5,040	0.9%
Democratic	Jimmy Ausbrooks	3,629	0.7%
Democratic	Eric Rothmuller	2,995	0.6%
Democratic	John Sharpensteen	2,992	0.5%
Total votes		544,062	100%

=== 2022 ===
United States Senate election in Kentucky Democratic primary, 2022
Party	Candidate	Votes	%
Democratic	Charles Booker	214,060	73.2%
Democratic	Joshua Blanton Sr.	30,943	10.6%
Democratic	John Merrill	29,075	9.9%
Democratic	Ruth Gao	18,171	6.2%
Total votes		292,249	100%

United States Senate election in Kentucky, 2022
Party	Candidate	Votes	%
Republican	Rand Paul (incumbent)	913,257	61.8%
Democratic	Charles Booker	564,231	38.1%
Independent	Charles Lee Thomason	110	0.01%
Independent	Billy Ray Wilson	24	0.00%
Total votes		1,477,622	100%
Republican hold			

=== 2026 ===
United States Senate election in Kentucky Democratic primary, 2026
Party	Candidate	Votes	%
Democratic	Charles Booker	155,488	46.8%
Democratic	Amy McGrath	119,244	35.9%
Democratic	Pamela Stevenson	20,600	6.2%
Democratic	Dale Romans	13,692	4.1%
Democratic	Logan Forsythe	9,643	2.9%
Democratic	Vincent Thompson	6,955	2.1%
Democratic	Joshua Blanton Sr.	6,940	2%
Total votes		332,562	100%

United States Senate election in Kentucky, 2026
Party	Candidate	Votes	%
Republican	Andy Barr	784,869	55%
Democratic	Charles Booker	612,357	42.9%
Independent	Christopher Campbell	29,892	2.1%
Total votes		1,427,118	100%
Republican hold			

== See also ==
- List of African-American United States Senate candidates

Party political offices
Preceded by Jim Gray	Democratic nominee for U.S. Senator from Kentucky (Class 3); 2022	Most recent
Preceded by Amy McGrath	Democratic nominee for U.S. Senator from Kentucky (Class 2); 2026	Most recent
