= Carl Hines =

American politician

Member of the Kentucky House of Representatives from the 43rd district
- In office January 1, 1978 – January 1, 1987
- Preceded by: Norbert Blume
- Succeeded by: Porter Hatcher

Personal details
- Born: March 23, 1931 Louisville, Kentucky, United States
- Died: September 7, 2016 (aged 85)
- Party: Democratic
- Spouse: Teresa Churchill
- Children: 4
- Occupation: Politician, Attorney, and Real Estate Agent

Carl R. Hines Sr. (March 23, 1931 – September 7, 2016) was a former American politician in the state of Kentucky and the first African-American to have served Louisville District 43. He served in the Kentucky House of Representatives from 1978 to 1987, as a Democrat. He attended the University of Louisville and earned a Bachelor of Science degree, and also attended Law School there. He was a real estate agent. Hines married Teresa Churchill and had four children.

== Military life ==
Hines graduated high school in January 1949 and would start to attend Illinois in September 1949. In 1950 the Korean Conflict broke out and Hines would voluntarily join the Air Force on January 1, 1951, and serve for three years. In October 1951 Hines would go to Korea and serve as a gunner. Hines’ tour in Korea was fifty-five combat missions and after the combat missions were completed he would head back to the United States.

== College life ==
Hines started college at Illinois and would leave early due to joining the Air Force. Then three years later Hines attended the University of Louisville and would graduate with a bachelor's degree in 1974. He would also attend law school at the University of Louisville for two years.

== Early work life ==
Prior to being elected to the Kentucky Legislature, Hines was employed as the district manager of the Mammoth Life and Accident Insurance Company, then Hines was appointed to the Louisville Board of Education in 1968. In 1970, Hines was elected secretary of the Louisville-Jefferson County Community Action Commission, and named director of the Housing Opportunity Center in Louisville.

== "My Old Kentucky Home" ==
In 1986, Hines led the movement to change the wording of the Kentucky State Song, "My Old Kentucky Home". In that year, a Japanese youth group visiting the Kentucky General Assembly sang the song to the legislators, using the original lyrics that included the word "darkies". Hines subsequently introduced a resolution that would substitute the word "people" in place of "darkies" whenever the song was used by the House of Representatives. Georgia Davis Powers introduced a similar resolution in the Kentucky Senate. Both chambers adopted the resolution.

== Organizations ==
Louisville Bd Educ, 1968 & 1972; Housing Com Louisville C C, 1985; Housing Task Force Louisville C C; Mayor's Housing Task Force under Mayor Frank Burke; Nat An Community Develop; bd dir, State KY Housing Corp; Coun, Nat Cr Housing Mgt Wash; adv comt, Non-Profit Housing Ctr; vice chmn, Jefferson Co Bd Edu; Dist Lines Subcom Charter Com Merger Louisville & Jefferson Co Schs; former mem bd, Louisville NAACP, W Louisville Optimist Club; past chmn, Shawnee Dist Boy Scouts Am; pres, Just Men's Civic & Social Club; exec secy, Louisville & Jefferson Co Community Action Com; vice Chmn bd mgrs, YMCA; chmn, Fifth Region KY Sch Bd Asn; Gov's Adv Con Educ; Fed Rels Network Nat Sch Bd Asn; dir, chair, Nat Caucus Black Sch, Ky City; Asn Realtors.
