= Paul Bather =

American politician

Member of the Kentucky House of Representatives from the 43rd district
- In office January 24, 2000 – January 1, 2005
- Preceded by: Porter Hatcher
- Succeeded by: Darryl Owens

Personal details
- Born: June 30, 1947
- Died: February 11, 2009 (aged 61)
- Party: Democratic

Paul Bather (June 30, 1947 – February 11, 2009) was an American politician from Kentucky who was a member of the Kentucky House of Representatives from 2000 to 2005. Bather was first elected in a January 2000 special election following the resignation of incumbent representative Porter Hatcher. He did not seek reelection in 2004.

Bather died on February 11, 2009.
