= Norbert Blume =

American politician

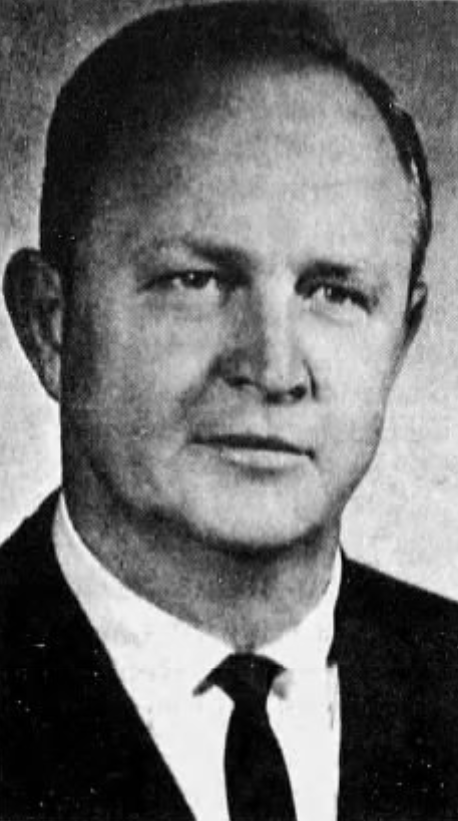
- Blume, c. 1971

86th Speaker of the Kentucky House of Representatives
- In office January 4, 1972 – January 6, 1976
- Preceded by: Julian Carroll
- Succeeded by: William G. Kenton

Speaker pro tempore of the Kentucky House of Representatives
- In office January 6, 1970 – January 4, 1972
- Preceded by: Terry McBrayer
- Succeeded by: Billy Ray Paxton

Member of the Kentucky House of Representatives from the 43rd district
- In office January 1, 1964 – January 1, 1978
- Preceded by: Elmer Leister
- Succeeded by: Carl Hines

Personal details
- Born: August 30, 1922 Louisville, Kentucky, U.S.
- Died: October 5, 2011 (aged 89)
- Party: Democratic
- Education: University of Louisville; University of Kentucky

Norbert L. Blume (August 30, 1922 – October 5, 2011) was an American politician. He served as a Democratic member of the Kentucky House of Representatives.

== Life and career ==
Blume was born in Louisville, Kentucky. He attended the University of Louisville and the University of Kentucky. He served in the United States Navy during World War II.

Blume represented the 43rd district in the Kentucky House of Representatives from 1964 to 1978.

Blume died on October 5, 2011, at the age of 89.
