= 2023 Kentucky Attorney General election =

- November 7, 2023
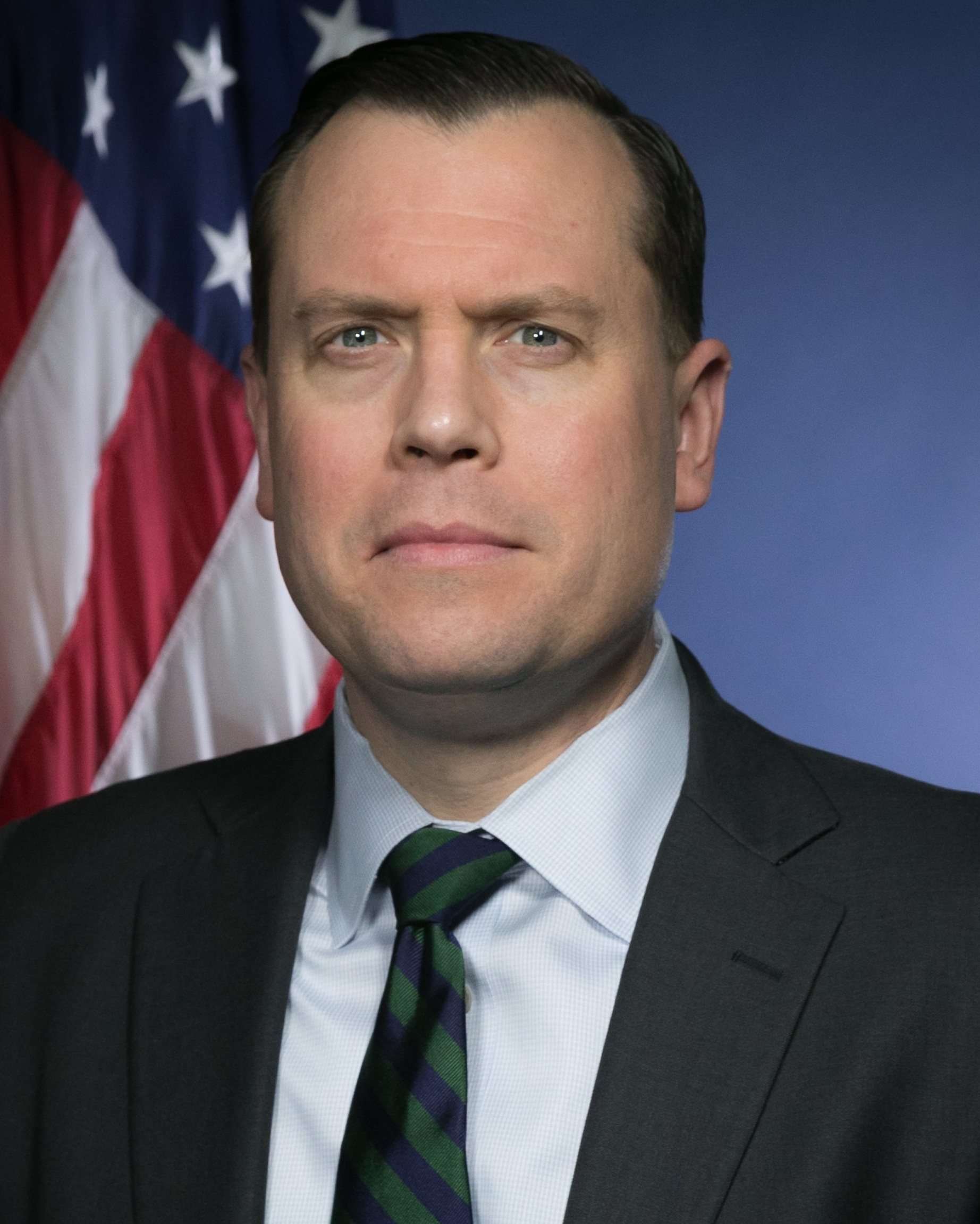

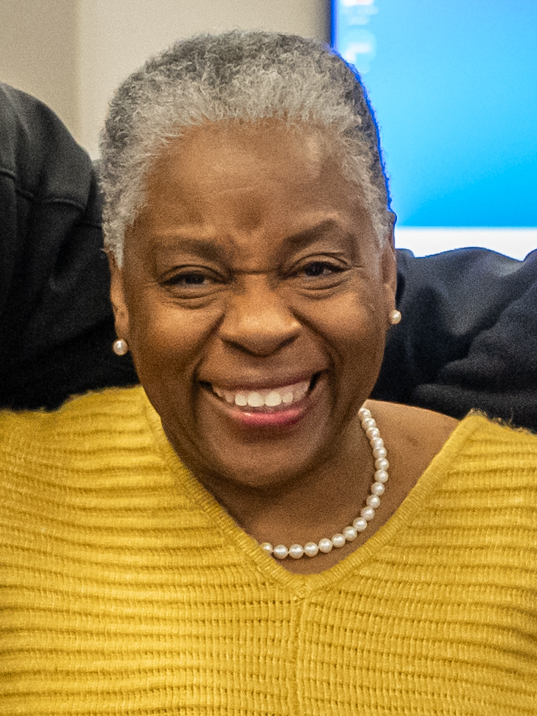
Nominee	Russell Coleman	Pamela Stevenson
Party	Republican	Democratic
Popular vote	752,692	544,748
Percentage	58.01%	41.99%
- Coleman: 50–60% 60–70% 70–80% 80–90% Stevenson: 50–60% 60–70%
Attorney General before election
Daniel Cameron
Republican
Elected Attorney General
Russell Coleman
Republican

The 2023 Kentucky Attorney General election took place on November 7, 2023, to elect the attorney general of Kentucky. Republican incumbent Daniel Cameron retired to run unsuccessfully for governor against Andy Beshear. Republican nominee Russell Coleman defeated Democratic nominee Pamela Stevenson.

== Republican primary ==
=== Candidates ===
==== Nominee ====
- Russell Coleman, former U.S. attorney for the Western District of Kentucky

==== Declined ====
- Michael Adams, Kentucky secretary of state (running for re-election)
- Allison Ball, Kentucky state treasurer (ran for state auditor)
- Daniel Cameron, incumbent attorney general (ran for governor)
- Whitney Westerfield, state senator, nominee for attorney general in 2015 and candidate in 2019

== Democratic primary ==
=== Candidates ===
==== Nominee ====
- Pamela Stevenson, state representative for the 43rd district

== General election ==
=== Predictions ===
Source	Ranking	As of
Sabato's Crystal Ball	Likely R	June 21, 2023

=== Endorsements ===
Russell Coleman (R)

Executive branch officials

- William Barr, 77th and 85th United States attorney general (1991–1993, 2019–2020)
- Timothy Shea, acting administrator of the DEA (2020–2021)

U.S. senators

- Rand Paul, U.S. senator from Kentucky (2011–present)

U.S. representatives

- Andy Barr, U.S. representative from KY-06 (2013–present)
- Brett Guthrie, U.S. representative from KY-02 (2009–present)

Organizations

- Kentucky Right to Life
- National Rifle Association Political Victory Fund
- Republican Attorneys General Association
- Susan B. Anthony Pro-Life America

Labor unions

- Indiana/Kentucky/Ohio Regional Council of Carpenters
- Kentucky Fraternal Order of Police
Pamela Stevenson (D)

U.S. governors

- Andy Beshear, governor of Kentucky (2019–present)

Organizations

- The Collective PAC
- Democratic Attorneys General Association
- EMILY's List
- Fairness Campaign
- Planned Parenthood
- Reproductive Freedom for All

Labor unions

- Kentucky State AFL-CIO
- United Mine Workers of America

=== Polling ===
Poll source	Date(s) administered	Sample size (Note: Key: A – all adults RV – registered voters LV – likely voters V – unclear)	Margin of error	Russell Coleman (R)	Pamela Stevenson (D)	Undecided
Public Opinion Strategies (R) (Note: Poll commissioned by the Republican State Leadership Committee)	July 19–20, 2023	500 (LV)	± 4.4%	41%	27%	31%
Cygnal (R)	May 22–23, 2023	600 (LV)	± 3.9%	39%	29%	32%

=== Results ===
2023 Kentucky Attorney General election
Party	Candidate	Votes	%	±%
Republican	Russell Coleman	752,692	58.01%	+0.24%
Democratic	Pamela Stevenson	544,748	41.99%	−0.24%
Total votes		1,297,440	100.00%	
Republican hold				

==== By congressional district ====
Coleman won five of six congressional districts.

District	Coleman	Stevenson	Representative
1st	67%	33%	James Comer
2nd	64%	36%	Brett Guthrie
3rd	37%	63%	Morgan McGarvey
4th	62%	38%	Thomas Massie
5th	72%	28%	Hal Rogers
6th	52%	48%	Andy Barr

== Notes ==
Partisan clients
