= 2018 United States House of Representatives elections in Kentucky =

- November 6, 2018

All 6 Kentucky seats to the United States House of Representatives
| | Majority party | Minority party |
|---|---|---|
| Party | Republican | Democratic |
| Last election | 5 | 1 |
| Seats won | 5 | 1 |
| Seat change | Steady | Steady |
| Popular vote | 935,564 | 613,040 |
| Percentage | 59.59% | 39.05% |
| Swing | ▼11.11% | ▲9.77% |

Republican
50–60%
60–70%
70–80%
80–90%
>90%
Democratic
50–60%
60–70%

The 2018 United States House of Representatives elections in Kentucky were held on November 6, 2018, to elect the six U.S. representatives from the state of Kentucky, one from each of the state's six congressional districts. The elections coincided with other elections to the House of Representatives, elections to the United States Senate, and various state and local elections.

== Overview ==
Popular vote
| Republican | 59.59% |
| Democratic | 39.05% |
| Other | 1.36% |

House seats
| Republican | 83.33% |
| Democratic | 16.67% |

=== By district ===
Results of the 2018 United States House of Representatives elections in Kentucky by district:

| District | Republican | | Democratic | | Others | | Total | | Result |
| District | Votes | % | Votes | % | Votes | % | Votes | % | Result |
|---|---|---|---|---|---|---|---|---|---|
| District 1 | 172,167 | 68.59% | 78,849 | 31.41% | 0 | 0.00% | 251,016 | 100.0% | Republican hold |
| District 2 | 171,700 | 66.72% | 79,964 | 31.07% | 5,681 | 2.21% | 257,345 | 100.0% | Republican hold |
| District 3 | 101,930 | 36.57% | 173,002 | 62.07% | 3,788 | 1.36% | 278,720 | 100.0% | Democratic hold |
| District 4 | 162,946 | 62.24% | 90,536 | 34.58% | 8,330 | 3.18% | 261,812 | 100.0% | Republican hold |
| District 5 | 172,093 | 78.94% | 45,890 | 21.05% | 34 | 0.02% | 218,017 | 100.0% | Republican hold |
| District 6 | 154,468 | 51.00% | 144,736 | 47.79% | 3,684 | 1.22% | 302,888 | 100.0% | Republican hold |
| Total | 935,304 | 59.58% | 612,977 | 39.05% | 21,517 | 1.37% | 1,569,798 | 100.0% | |

== District 1 ==
2018 Kentucky's 1st congressional district election
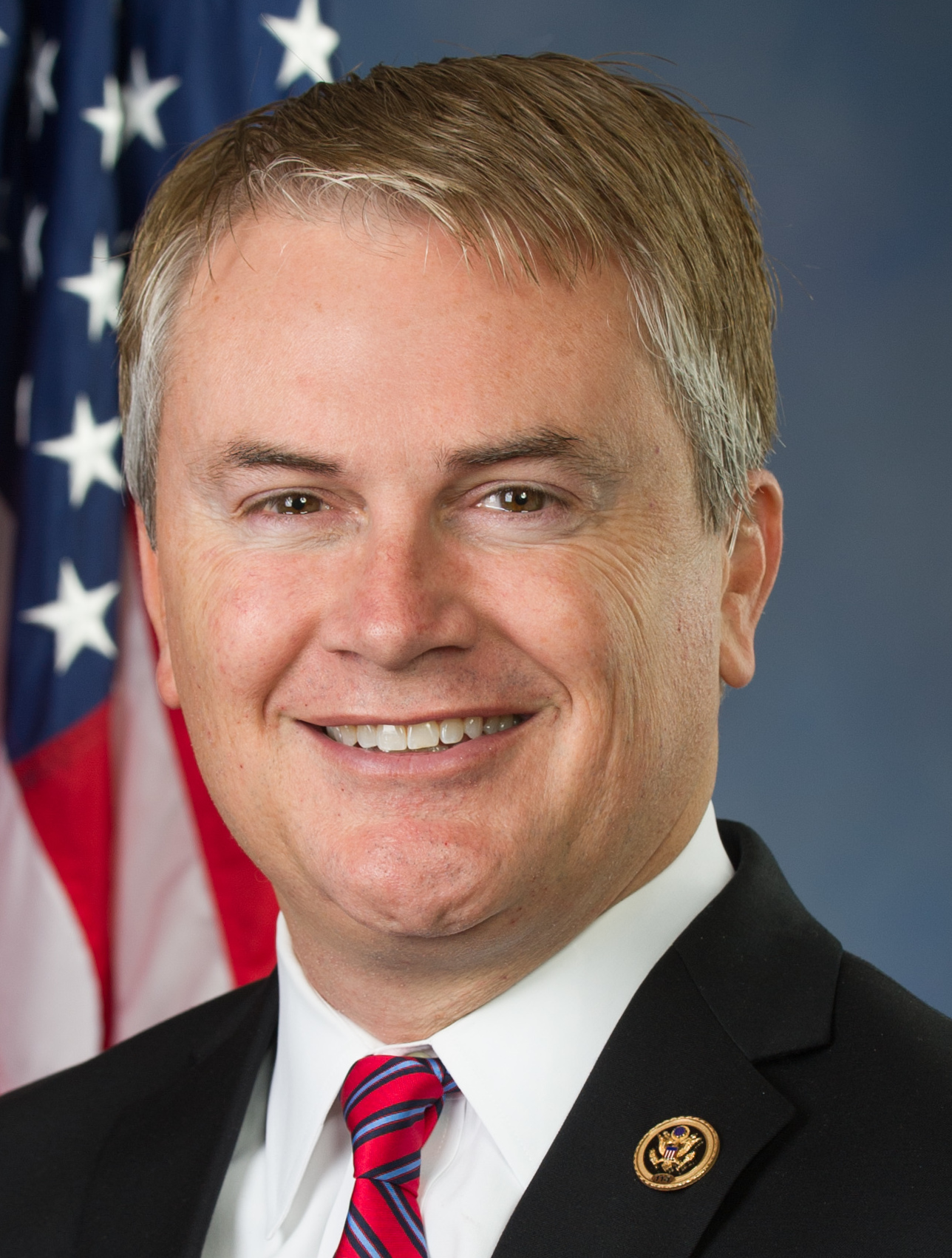

| Nominee | James Comer | Paul Walker |
| Party | Republican | Democratic |
| Popular vote | 172,167 | 78,849 |
| Percentage | 68.6% | 31.4% |
- County results Comer: 50–60% 60–70% 70–80% 80–90% >90%
U.S. Representative before election
James Comer
Republican
Elected U.S. Representative
James Comer
Republican

Incumbent Republican James Comer, who had represented the district since 2016, ran for re-election. He was re-elected with 73% of the vote in 2016. The district had a PVI of R+23.

=== Republican primary ===
==== Candidates ====
===== Nominee =====
- James Comer, incumbent U.S. representative

=== Democratic primary ===
==== Candidates ====
===== Nominee =====
- Paul Walker, professor

===== Eliminated in primary =====
- Alonzo Pennington, musician

==== Results ====
Democratic primary results
| Party | Candidate | Votes | % |
|---|---|---|---|
| Democratic | Paul Walker | 51,094 | 74.6 |
| Democratic | Alonzo Pennington | 17,398 | 25.4 |
| Total votes | | 68,492 | 100.0 |

=== General election ===
==== Predictions ====
| Source | Ranking | As of |
|---|---|---|
| The Cook Political Report | Safe R | November 5, 2018 |
| Inside Elections | Safe R | November 5, 2018 |
| Sabato's Crystal Ball | Safe R | November 5, 2018 |
| RCP | Safe R | November 5, 2018 |
| Daily Kos | Safe R | November 5, 2018 |
| 538 | Safe R | November 7, 2018 |
| CNN | Safe R | October 31, 2018 |
| Politico | Safe R | November 4, 2018 |

==== Results ====
Kentucky's 1st congressional district, 2018
| Party | Candidate | Votes | % |
|---|---|---|---|
| Republican | James Comer (incumbent) | 172,167 | 68.6 |
| Democratic | Paul Walker | 78,849 | 31.4 |
| Total votes | | 251,016 | 100.0 |
| Republican hold | | | |

== District 2 ==
2018 Kentucky's 2nd congressional district election
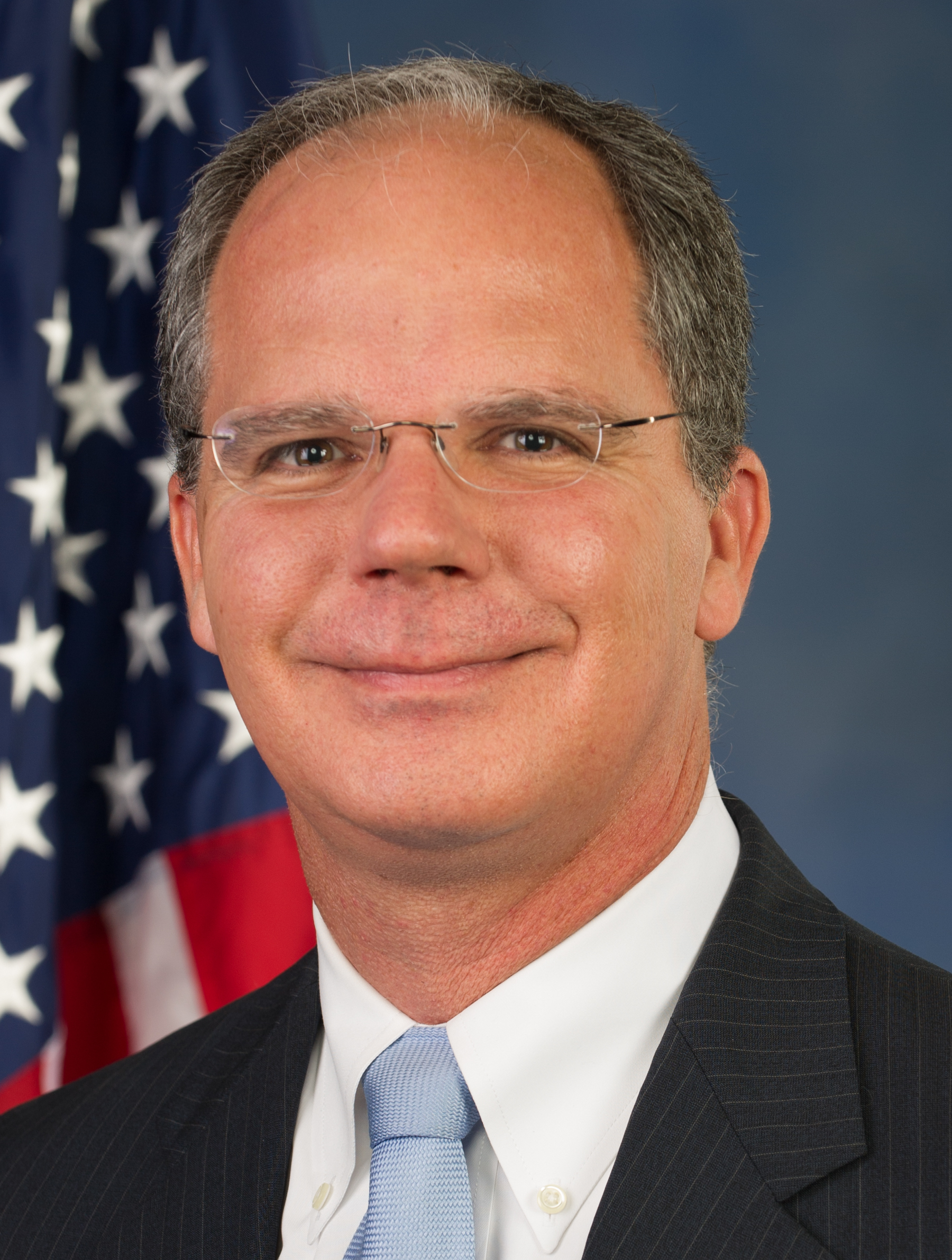

| Nominee | Brett Guthrie | Hank Linderman |
| Party | Republican | Democratic |
| Popular vote | 171,700 | 79,964 |
| Percentage | 66.7% | 31.1% |
- County results Guthrie: 60–70% 70–80% 80–90%
U.S. Representative before election
Brett Guthrie
Republican
Elected U.S. Representative
Brett Guthrie
Republican

Incumbent Republican Brett Guthrie, who had represented the district since 2009, ran for re-election. He was re-elected unopposed in 2016. The district had a PVI of R+19.

=== Republican primary ===
==== Candidates ====
===== Nominee =====
- Brett Guthrie, incumbent U.S. representative

=== Democratic primary ===
==== Candidates ====
===== Nominee =====
- Hank Linderman, musician

===== Eliminated in primary =====
- Brian Pedigo, teacher and farmer
- Rane Eir Olivia Sessions, veteran and former intern for William D. Ford
- Grant Short, pilot, businessman and candidate for U.S. Senate in 2016

==== Results ====
Democratic primary results
| Party | Candidate | Votes | % |
|---|---|---|---|
| Democratic | Hank Linderman | 14,516 | 30.0 |
| Democratic | Brian Pedigo | 13,866 | 28.7 |
| Democratic | Rane Eir Olivia Sessions | 10,501 | 21.7 |
| Democratic | Grant Short | 9,470 | 19.6 |
| Total votes | | 48,353 | 100.0 |

=== General election ===
==== Predictions ====
| Source | Ranking | As of |
|---|---|---|
| The Cook Political Report | Safe R | November 5, 2018 |
| Inside Elections | Safe R | November 5, 2018 |
| Sabato's Crystal Ball | Safe R | November 5, 2018 |
| RCP | Safe R | November 5, 2018 |
| Daily Kos | Safe R | November 5, 2018 |
| 538 | Safe R | November 7, 2018 |
| CNN | Safe R | October 31, 2018 |
| Politico | Safe R | November 4, 2018 |

==== Results ====
Kentucky's 2nd congressional district, 2018
| Party | Candidate | Votes | % |
|---|---|---|---|
| Republican | Brett Guthrie (incumbent) | 171,700 | 66.7 |
| Democratic | Hank Linderman | 79,964 | 31.1 |
| Independent | Thomas Loecken | 5,681 | 2.2 |
| Total votes | | 257,345 | 100.0 |
| Republican hold | | | |

== District 3 ==
2018 Kentucky's 3rd congressional district election
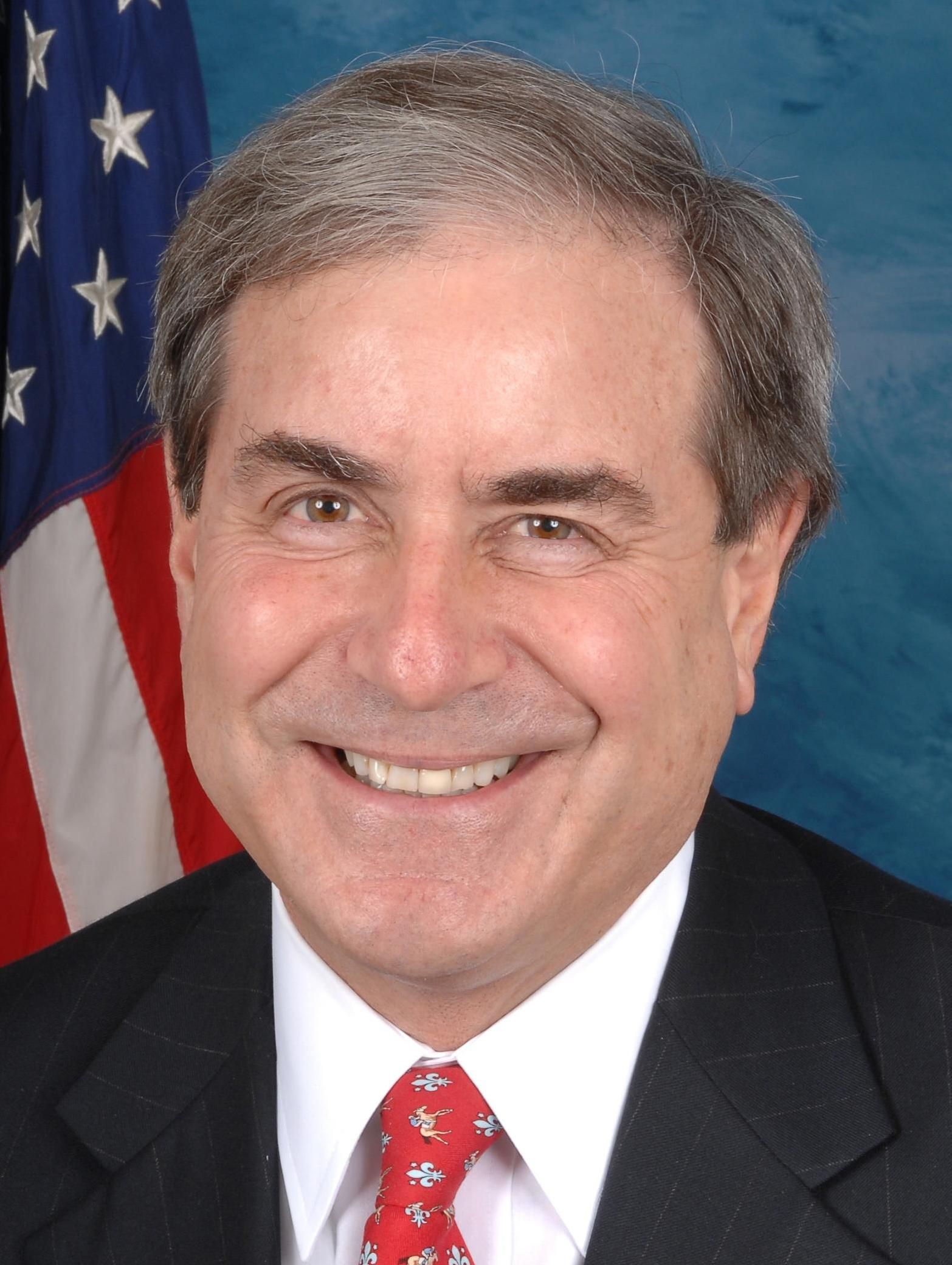

| Nominee | John Yarmuth | Vickie Yates Glisson |
| Party | Democratic | Republican |
| Popular vote | 173,002 | 101,930 |
| Percentage | 62.1% | 36.1% |
- County results Yarmuth: 60–70%
U.S. Representative before election
John Yarmuth
Democratic
Elected U.S. Representative
John Yarmuth
Democratic

Incumbent Democrat John Yarmuth, who had represented the district since 2007, ran for re-election. He was re-elected with 63% of the vote in 2016. The district had a PVI of D+6.

=== Democratic primary ===
==== Candidates ====
===== Nominee =====
- John Yarmuth, incumbent U.S. representative

=== Republican primary ===
==== Candidates ====
===== Nominee =====
- Vickie Yates Glisson, lawyer and former state health secretary

===== Eliminated in primary =====
- Mike Craven, Ford worker
- Rhonda Palazzo, realtor

===== Withdrawn =====
- Waymen Eddings

==== Primary results ====
Republican primary results
| Party | Candidate | Votes | % |
|---|---|---|---|
| Republican | Vickie Yates Glisson | 11,239 | 49.1 |
| Republican | Mike Craven | 6,163 | 26.9 |
| Republican | Rhonda Palazzo | 5,511 | 24.0 |
| Total votes | | 22,913 | 100.0 |

=== General election ===
==== Predictions ====
| Source | Ranking | As of |
|---|---|---|
| The Cook Political Report | Safe D | November 5, 2018 |
| Inside Elections | Safe D | November 5, 2018 |
| Sabato's Crystal Ball | Safe D | November 5, 2018 |
| RCP | Safe D | November 5, 2018 |
| Daily Kos | Safe D | November 5, 2018 |
| 538 | Safe D | November 7, 2018 |
| CNN | Safe D | October 31, 2018 |
| Politico | Safe D | November 4, 2018 |

==== Results ====
Kentucky's 3rd congressional district, 2018
| Party | Candidate | Votes | % |
|---|---|---|---|
| Democratic | John Yarmuth (incumbent) | 173,002 | 62.1 |
| Republican | Vickie Yates Glisson | 101,930 | 36.6 |
| Libertarian | Gregory Boles | 3,788 | 1.4 |
| Total votes | | 278,720 | 100.0 |
| Democratic hold | | | |

== District 4 ==
2018 Kentucky's 4th congressional district election
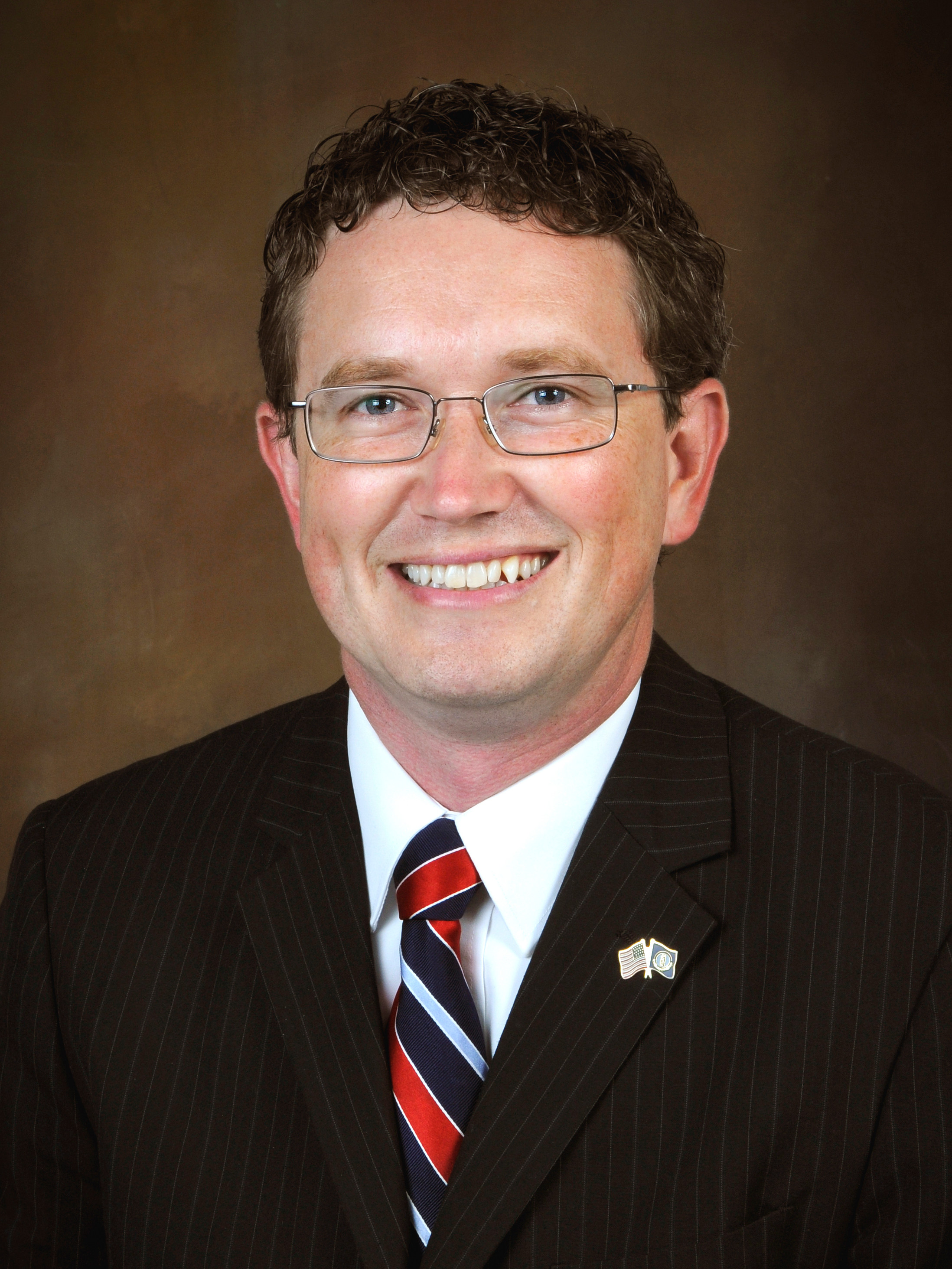

| Nominee | Thomas Massie | Seth Hall |
| Party | Republican | Democratic |
| Popular vote | 162,946 | 90,536 |
| Percentage | 62.2% | 34.6% |
- County results Massie: 50–60% 60–70% 70–80% 80–90%
U.S. Representative before election
Thomas Massie
Republican
Elected U.S. Representative
Thomas Massie
Republican

Incumbent Republican Thomas Massie, who had represented the district since 2012, ran for re-election. He was re-elected with 71% of the vote in 2016. The district had a PVI of R+18.

=== Republican primary ===
==== Candidates ====
===== Nominee =====
- Thomas Massie, incumbent U.S. representative

==== Primary results ====
2018 Kentucky's 4th congressional district Republican primary election
| Party | Candidate | Votes | % |
|---|---|---|---|
| Republican | Thomas Massie | Uncontested | N/A |

=== Democratic primary ===
==== Candidates ====
===== Nominee =====
- Seth Hall, health insurance worker

===== Eliminated in primary =====
- Christina Lord
- Patti Piatt, business executive

==== Primary results ====
Democratic primary results
| Party | Candidate | Votes | % |
|---|---|---|---|
| Democratic | Seth Hall | 17,859 | 40.8 |
| Democratic | Patti Piatt | 16,441 | 37.5 |
| Democratic | Christina Lord | 9,509 | 21.7 |
| Total votes | | 43,809 | 100.0 |

=== General election ===
==== Predictions ====
| Source | Ranking | As of |
|---|---|---|
| The Cook Political Report | Safe R | November 5, 2018 |
| Inside Elections | Safe R | November 5, 2018 |
| Sabato's Crystal Ball | Safe R | November 5, 2018 |
| RCP | Safe R | November 5, 2018 |
| Daily Kos | Safe R | November 5, 2018 |
| 538 | Safe R | November 7, 2018 |
| CNN | Safe R | October 31, 2018 |
| Politico | Safe R | November 4, 2018 |

==== Results ====
Kentucky's 4th congressional district, 2018
| Party | Candidate | Votes | % |
|---|---|---|---|
| Republican | Thomas Massie (incumbent) | 162,946 | 62.2 |
| Democratic | Seth Hall | 90,536 | 34.6 |
| Independent | Mike Moffett | 8,318 | 2.2 |
| Independent | David Goodwin (write-in) | 12 | 0.0 |
| Total votes | | 261,812 | 100.0 |
| Republican hold | | | |

== District 5 ==
2018 Kentucky's 5th congressional district election
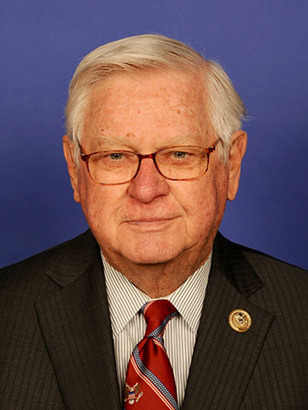

| Nominee | Hal Rogers | Kenneth Stepp |
| Party | Republican | Democratic |
| Popular vote | 172,093 | 45,890 |
| Percentage | 78.9% | 21.0% |
- County results Rogers: 50–60% 60–70% 70–80% 80–90% >90%
U.S. Representative before election
Hal Rogers
Republican
Elected U.S. Representative
Hal Rogers
Republican

Incumbent Republican Hal Rogers, who had represented the district since 1981, ran for re-election. He was re-elected unopposed in 2016. The district had a PVI of R+31.

=== Republican primary ===
==== Candidates ====
===== Nominee =====
- Hal Rogers, incumbent U.S. representative

===== Eliminated in primary =====
- Gerardo Serrano

==== Primary results ====
Republican primary results
| Party | Candidate | Votes | % |
|---|---|---|---|
| Republican | Hal Rogers (incumbent) | 75,405 | 84.2 |
| Republican | Gerardo Serrano | 14,177 | 15.8 |
| Total votes | | 89,582 | 100.0 |

=== Democratic primary ===
==== Candidates ====
===== Nominee =====
- Kenneth Stepp, attorney

===== Eliminated in primary =====
- Scott Sykes

==== Primary results ====
Democratic primary results
| Party | Candidate | Votes | % |
|---|---|---|---|
| Democratic | Kenneth Stepp | 33,584 | 58.7 |
| Democratic | Scott Sykes | 23,637 | 41.3 |
| Total votes | | 57,221 | 100.0 |

=== General election ===
==== Predictions ====
| Source | Ranking | As of |
|---|---|---|
| The Cook Political Report | Safe R | November 5, 2018 |
| Inside Elections | Safe R | November 5, 2018 |
| Sabato's Crystal Ball | Safe R | November 5, 2018 |
| RCP | Safe R | November 5, 2018 |
| Daily Kos | Safe R | November 5, 2018 |
| 538 | Safe R | November 7, 2018 |
| CNN | Safe R | October 31, 2018 |
| Politico | Safe R | November 4, 2018 |

==== Results ====
Kentucky's 5th congressional district, 2018
| Party | Candidate | Votes | % |
|---|---|---|---|
| Republican | Hal Rogers (incumbent) | 172,093 | 78.9 |
| Democratic | Kenneth Stepp | 45,890 | 21.0 |
| Independent | Bill Ray (write-in) | 34 | 0.1 |
| Total votes | | 218,017 | 100.0 |

== District 6 ==
2018 Kentucky's 6th congressional district election
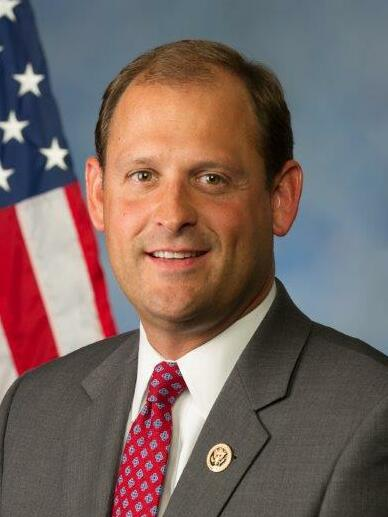

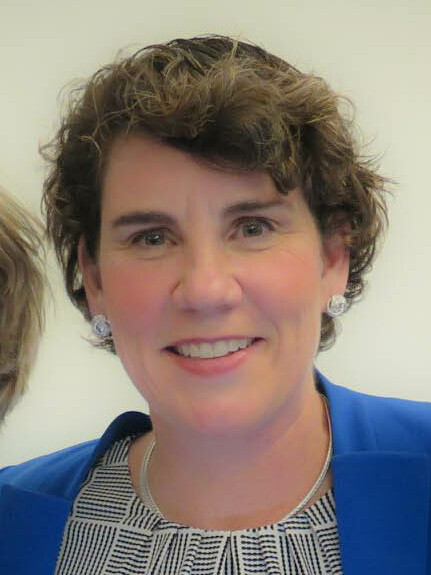
| Nominee | Andy Barr | Amy McGrath |
| Party | Republican | Democratic |
| Popular vote | 154,468 | 144,736 |
| Percentage | 51.0% | 47.8% |
- County results Barr: 50–60% 60–70% 70–80% McGrath: 50–60%
U.S. Representative before election
Andy Barr
Republican
Elected U.S. Representative
Andy Barr
Republican

Incumbent Republican Andy Barr, who had represented the district since 2013, ran for re-election. He was re-elected with 61% of the vote in 2016. The district had a PVI of R+9.

=== Republican primary ===
==== Candidates ====
===== Nominee =====
- Andy Barr, incumbent U.S. representative

===== Eliminated in primary =====
- Chuck Eddy

==== Primary results ====
Republican primary results
| Party | Candidate | Votes | % |
|---|---|---|---|
| Republican | Andy Barr (incumbent) | 40,514 | 83.8 |
| Republican | Chuck Eddy | 7,858 | 16.2 |
| Total votes | | 48,372 | 100.0 |

=== Democratic primary ===
==== Candidates ====
===== Nominee =====
- Amy McGrath, retired U.S. Marine fighter pilot

===== Eliminated in primary =====
- Jim Gray, mayor of Lexington and nominee for U.S. Senate in 2016
- Theodore Green
- Daniel Kemph, business analyst
- Reggie Thomas, state senator
- Geoff Young, perennial candidate

==== Campaign ====
The Democratic Congressional Campaign Committee included Kentucky's 6th congressional district on its initial list of Republican-held seats considered targets in 2018. McGrath's campaign announcement video, entitled "Told Me", in which she spoke of her Navy service (being the first female Marine to fly an F-18 in combat), attracted much national attention.

The DCCC opted to support Jim Gray in the primary.

==== Endorsements ====
Jim Gray

Labor unions

- United Steelworkers

Organizations

- LGBTQ Victory Fund

Newspapers

- Lexington Herald-Leader
Amy McGrath

U.S. senators

- Kirsten Gillibrand, former U.S. senator from New York (2009–present)

U.S. representatives

- Seth Moulton, U.S. representative from Massachusetts's 6th congressional district (2015–present)

Organizations

- VoteVets
- With Honor
Reggie Thomas

Individuals

- Nancy Jo Kemper, former executive director of the Kentucky Council of Churches and nominee for this seat in 2016

==== Polling ====
| Poll source | Date(s) administered | Sample size | Margin of error | Jim Gray | Amy McGrath | Reggie Thomas | Other | Undecided |
|---|---|---|---|---|---|---|---|---|
| Garin Hart Yang (D-McGrath) | April 17–19, 2018 | 400 | ±5.0% | 35% | 42% | 6% | 3% | 14% |
| Mellman Group (D-Gray) | March 3–6, 2018 | 400 | ±4.9% | 52% | 19% | 6% | — | 23% |

==== Results ====
County results Map legend: McGrath—60–70%; McGrath—50–60%; McGrath—40–50%; Gray—50–60%

Democratic primary results
| Party | Candidate | Votes | % |
|---|---|---|---|
| Democratic | Amy McGrath | 48,859 | 48.7 |
| Democratic | Jim Gray | 40,684 | 40.5 |
| Democratic | Reggie Thomas | 7,226 | 7.2 |
| Democratic | Geoff Young | 1,574 | 1.6 |
| Democratic | Daniel Kemph | 1,240 | 1.2 |
| Democratic | Theodore Green | 835 | 0.8 |
| Total votes | | 100,418 | 100.0 |

=== General election ===
==== Endorsements ====
Andy Barr (R)

U.S. executive branch officials

- Donald Trump, president of the United States
Amy McGrath (D)

U.S. senators

- Kirsten Gillibrand, former U.S. senator from New York (2009–present)

U.S. representatives

- Seth Moulton, U.S. representative from Massachusetts's 6th congressional district (2015–present)

Organizations

- Democratic Congressional Campaign Committee "Red to Blue" Program
- VoteVets
- With Honor

==== Polling ====
View source data.

| Poll source | Date(s) administered | Sample size | Margin of error | Andy Barr (R) | Amy McGrath (D) | Other | Undecided |
|---|---|---|---|---|---|---|---|
| NYT Upshot/Siena College | November 1–4, 2018 | 438 | ± 4.9% | 44% | 44% | 2% | 10% |
| Public Opinion Strategies (R-Barr) | October 6–8, 2018 | 400 | ± 4.9% | 48% | 46% | – | – |
| Garin-Hart-Yang Research Group (D-McGrath) | September 30 – October 2, 2018 | 501 | ± 4.5% | 44% | 51% | – | – |
| Pulse Opinion Research | September 12–17, 2018 | 600 | ± 4.0% | 47% | 47% | 2% | 3% |
| NYT Upshot/Siena College | September 6–8, 2018 | 506 | ± 4.9% | 47% | 46% | – | 7% |
| Fabrizio, Lee & Associates (R-CLF) | September 4–6, 2018 | 400 | ± 4.9% | 49% | 45% | – | 6% |
| Garin-Hart-Yang Research Group (D-McGrath) | July 7–10, 2018 | 461 | ± 4.6% | 43% | 50% | – | 7% |
| Fabrizio, Lee & Associates (R-CLF) | June 6–7, 2018 | 400 | ± 4.9% | 38% | 51% | – | 11% |
| DCCC (D) | April 30 – May 2, 2018 | 508 | ± 4.4% | 37% | 52% | – | 8% |
| Garin-Hart-Yang Research Group (D-McGrath) | February 5–7, 2018 | 401 | ± 5.0% | 48% | 44% | – | – |

Hypothetical polling

| Poll source | Date(s) administered | Sample size | Margin of error | Andy Barr (R) | Generic Democrat | Other | Undecided |
|---|---|---|---|---|---|---|---|
| Public Policy Polling (D) | February 12–13, 2018 | 662 | ± 3.8% | 42% | 44% | – | 14% |

==== Predictions ====
| Source | Ranking | As of |
|---|---|---|
| The Cook Political Report | Tossup | November 5, 2018 |
| Inside Elections | Tossup | November 5, 2018 |
| Sabato's Crystal Ball | Lean R | November 5, 2018 |
| RCP | Tossup | November 5, 2018 |
| Daily Kos | Tossup | November 5, 2018 |
| 538 | Tossup | November 7, 2018 |

==== Results ====
Kentucky's 6th congressional district, 2018
| Party | Candidate | Votes | % |
|---|---|---|---|
| Republican | Andy Barr (incumbent) | 154,468 | 51.0 |
| Democratic | Amy McGrath | 144,736 | 47.8 |
| Libertarian | Frank Harris | 2,150 | 0.7 |
| Independent | Rikka Wallin | 1,011 | 0.3 |
| Independent | James Germalic | 523 | 0.2 |
| Total votes | | 302,890 | 100.0 |
| Republican hold | | | |

== See also ==
- 2018 Kentucky House of Representatives election

Official campaign websites
- District 1
  - Paul Walker (D) for Congress
  - James Comer (R) for Congress
- District 2
  - Hank Linderman (D) for Congress
  - Brett Guthrie (R) for Congress
- District 3
  - John Yarmuth (D) for Congress
  - Vickie Yates Glisson (R) for Congress
- District 4
  - Seth Hall (D) for Congress
  - Thomas Massie (R) for Congress
  - David Goodwin (I) for Congress
- District 5
  - Hal Rogers (R) for Congress
  - Kenneth Stepp (D) for Congress
- District 6
  - Andy Barr (R) for Congress
  - Amy McGrath (D) for Congress
  - Frank Harris (L) for Congress
