= 2020 United States Senate election in Kentucky =

- November 3, 2020
- Turnout: 59.7% ▲
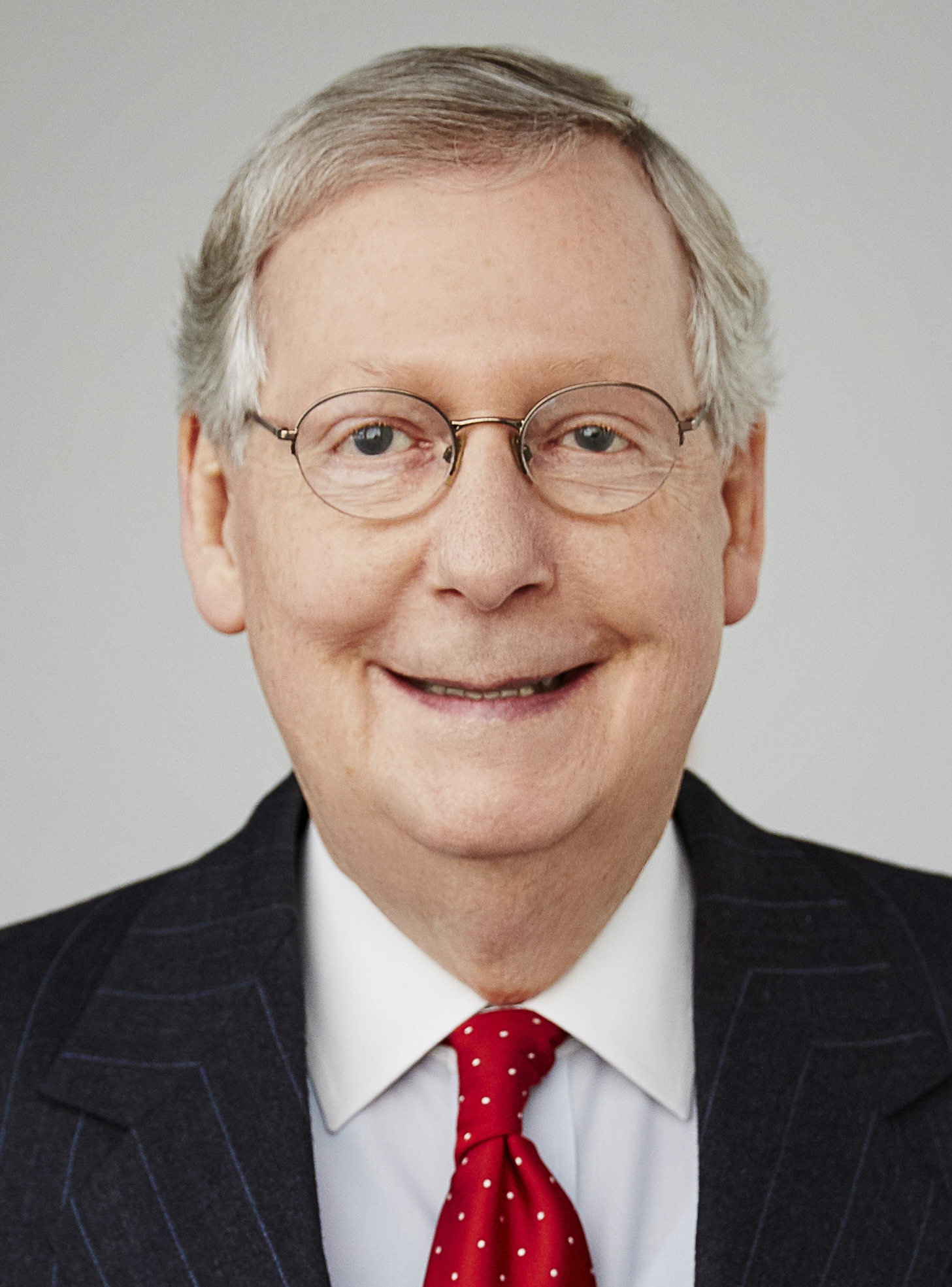

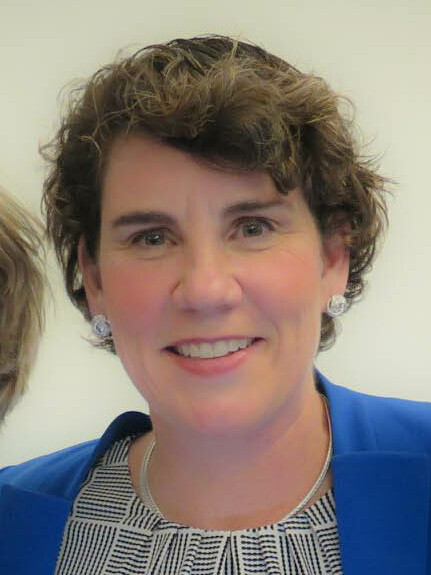
| Nominee | Mitch McConnell | Amy McGrath |
| Party | Republican | Democratic |
| Popular vote | 1,233,315 | 816,257 |
| Percentage | 57.76% | 38.23% |
- McConnell: 40–50% 50–60% 60–70% 70–80% 80–90% >90% McGrath: 40–50% 50–60% 60–70% 70–80% 80–90% >90% Tie: 40–50% 50% No data
U.S. senator before election
Mitch McConnell
Republican
Elected U.S. Senator
Mitch McConnell
Republican

The 2020 United States Senate election in Kentucky was held on November 3, 2020. Incumbent Republican Senator Mitch McConnell, who had been Senate majority leader since 2015 and had represented Kentucky in the Senate since 1985, won reelection to his seventh and final term in office. He faced off against former U.S. Marine fighter pilot Amy McGrath and Libertarian Brad Barron.

The Democratic and Republican primaries took place on June 23, 2020. As the primaries neared, the president of the National Bar Association accused officials of carrying out voter suppression. Compared to typical numbers of 3,700, the number of polling stations was reduced to 200 with only one in Louisville. Because a large number of voters voted by mail, absentee ballots were not counted until June 30. In the primary, over 937,000 people requested absentee ballots or voted early; this figure was far greater than usual.

Despite being outraised by tens of millions of dollars by McGrath, McConnell defeated McGrath by nearly 20 percentage points. Despite this, Republican nominee for President Donald Trump won the state in the concurrent presidential election by a much wider margin.

== Republican primary ==
=== Candidates ===
==== Nominee ====
- Mitch McConnell, incumbent U.S. senator and Senate majority leader

==== Eliminated in primary ====
- Nicholas Alsager
- Paul John Frangedakis, chiropractor (switched to independent write-in candidacy after losing primary)
- Louis Grider, truck driver
- Neren James
- Kenneth Lowndes
- C. Wesley Morgan, former state representative

==== Withdrawn ====
- Wendell K. Crow, businessman and entrepreneur (remained on ballot)
- Karl Das

=== Results ===
Results by county: McConnell—>90% McConnell—80–90% McConnell—70–80%

Republican primary results
| Party | Candidate | Votes | % |
|---|---|---|---|
| Republican | Mitch McConnell (incumbent) | 342,660 | 82.80% |
| Republican | C. Wesley Morgan | 25,588 | 6.18% |
| Republican | Louis Grider | 13,771 | 3.33% |
| Republican | Paul John Frangedakis | 11,957 | 2.89% |
| Republican | Neren James | 10,693 | 2.58% |
| Republican | Kenneth Lowndes | 5,548 | 1.34% |
| Republican | Nicholas Alsager | 3,603 | 0.87% |
| Total votes | | 413,820 | 100.0% |

== Democratic primary ==
=== Candidates ===
==== Nominee ====
- Amy McGrath, former U.S. Marine fighter pilot and 2018 Democratic nominee for Kentucky's 6th congressional district

==== Eliminated in primary ====
- Charles Booker, state representative
- Mike Broihier, farmer, educator, and former Marine
- Maggie Joe Hilliard
- Andrew Maynard
- Eric Rothmuller, small business owner
- John R. Sharpensteen
- Bennie J. Smith, local business owner
- Mary Ann Tobin, former Auditor of Kentucky

==== Withdrawn ====
- Jimmy Ausbrooks, mental health counselor (endorsed Mike Broihier) (remained on ballot)
- Steven Cox, registered pharmacy technician (endorsed Charles Booker)
- Joshua Paul Edwards
- Kevin Elliott, Assistant Professor of Political Science at Murray State University
- Dr. Loretta Babalmoradi Noble

==== Declined ====
- Rocky Adkins, former minority leader of the Kentucky House of Representatives and candidate for Governor of Kentucky in 2019
- Andy Beshear, Governor of Kentucky, former attorney general of Kentucky, and son of former governor Steve Beshear
- Steve Beshear, former governor of Kentucky and nominee for the U.S. Senate in 1996
- Jack Conway, former attorney general of Kentucky, nominee for the U.S. Senate in 2010, nominee for Governor of Kentucky in 2015
- Adam Edelen, former state auditor and candidate for Governor of Kentucky in 2019
- Greg Fischer, Mayor of Louisville
- Jim Gray, Secretary of the Kentucky Transportation Cabinet, former mayor of Lexington and nominee for the U.S. Senate in 2016
- Alison Lundergan Grimes, former secretary of state of Kentucky and nominee for the U.S. Senate in 2014 (endorsed Booker)
- Matt Jones, attorney, media personality, and restaurateur (had formed an exploratory committee beforehand, endorsed Booker)

=== Campaign ===
There were debates on March 5, 2020 and June 1, 2020.

==== Polling ====
| Poll source | Date(s) administered | Sample size (Note: Key: A – all adults RV – registered voters LV – likely voters V – unclear) | Margin of error | Charles Booker | Amy McGrath | Other | Undecided |
|---|---|---|---|---|---|---|---|
| Data for Progress (Note: Poll released after the primary in July) | June 10–22, 2020 | 556 (LV) | – | 43% | 46% | – | 10% |
| Garin-Hart-Yang (Note: Poll sponsored by McGrath's campaign) | June 16–18, 2020 | – | – | 32% | 42% | – | – |
| Civiqs/Data for Progress | June 13–15, 2020 | 421 (LV) | ± 5.5% | 44% | 36% | 9% (Note: Broihier and "someone else" with 4%; Tobin with 1%) | 11% |
| YouGov Blue/MVMT Communications (Note: Poll sponsored by Booker's campaign) | June 8–12, 2020 | 313 (RV) | ± 7.0% | 39% | 49% | 6% (Note: Broihier with 5%; other with 1%) | 3% |
| YouGov Blue/MVMT Communications | May 2020 | – (Note: Not yet released) | – | 13% | 62% | – | – |
| YouGov Blue/MVMT Communications | April 2020 | – | – | 11% | 62% | – | – |
| YouGov Blue/MVMT Communications | January 2020 | – | – | 7% | 65% | – | – |

=== Endorsements ===
Charles Booker

U.S. senators

- Jesse Jackson Sr., D.C. (1991–1997)
- Bernie Sanders, Vermont (2007–present)

U.S. representatives

- Alexandria Ocasio-Cortez, NY-14 (2019–present)

Statewide officials

- Alison Lundergan Grimes, former secretary of state of Kentucky (2012–2020) and Democratic nominee for this seat in 2014

State legislators

- Gerald Neal, state senator from the 33rd district (1989–present)
- Reggie Thomas, state senator from the 13th district (2014–present)

Individuals

- Nick Offerman, actor

Labor unions

- Association of Flight Attendants
- National Nurses United

Organizations

- Democracy for America
- Friends of the Earth Action
- Indivisible movement
- Kentuckians for the Commonwealth
- MoveOn

Political parties

- Working Families Party

Newspapers

- Lexington Herald-Leader
- Louisville Courier-Journal
Mike Broihier

State legislators

- Richard Ojeda, state senator from West Virginia's 7th district (2016–2019)

Individuals

- Marianne Williamson, author and 2020 presidential candidate
- Andrew Yang, entrepreneur and 2020 presidential candidate
- Wendell Berry, author

Organizations

- Indivisible Kentucky
Amy McGrath

Organizations

- Council for a Livable World
- DSCC
- Feminist Majority PAC
- Giffords
- JStreet PAC
- VoteVets

=== Results ===
Results by county: McGrath—60–70% McGrath—50–60% McGrath—40–50% Booker—40–50% Booker—50–60%

Democratic primary results
| Party | Candidate | Votes | % |
|---|---|---|---|
| Democratic | Amy McGrath | 247,037 | 45.41% |
| Democratic | Charles Booker | 231,888 | 42.62% |
| Democratic | Mike Broihier | 27,175 | 4.99% |
| Democratic | Mary Ann Tobin | 11,108 | 2.04% |
| Democratic | Maggie Joe Hilliard | 6,224 | 1.14% |
| Democratic | Andrew Maynard | 5,974 | 1.10% |
| Democratic | Bennie J. Smith | 5,040 | 0.93% |
| Democratic | Jimmy Ausbrooks (withdrawn) | 3,629 | 0.67% |
| Democratic | Eric Rothmuller | 2,995 | 0.55% |
| Democratic | John R. Sharpensteen | 2,992 | 0.55% |
| Total votes | | 544,062 | 100.0% |

== Other candidates ==
=== Libertarian primary ===
The Libertarian Party of Kentucky did not qualify to nominate through the taxpayer-funded primary and held its own privately operated primary on March 8, 2020. Anyone registered Libertarian in the state of Kentucky as of January 1, 2020, could participate. All candidates of the Libertarian Party of Kentucky must defeat None Of The Above (NOTA) to obtain the nomination.

==== Nominee ====
- Brad Barron, farmer and entrepreneur

=== Reform Party ===
==== Withdrawn ====
- Derek Leonard Petteys

=== Independents ===
==== Declared ====
- Daniel Cobble (as a write-in candidate)
- Harold H. Fitzpatrick (as a write-in candidate)
- Paul John Frangedakis (as a write-in candidate) (switched from Republican candidacy after losing primary)
- Randall Lee Teegarden (as a write-in candidate)
- Demetra Wysinger (as a write-in candidate)

==== Withdrawn ====
- Alyssa Dara McDowell, independent candidate for president in 2016, 2018 Independent nominee for Kentucky House of Representatives District 65

== General election ==
Throughout the general election campaign, McConnell portrayed McGrath as an overly liberal "rioter apologist". He highlighted a comment McGrath made in 2018 in which she compared her reaction to Donald Trump's 2016 presidential victory to her reaction to the September 11 attacks.

=== Debates ===
- Complete video of debate, October 12, 2020 - C-SPAN

=== Predictions ===
| Source | Ranking | As of |
|---|---|---|
| The Cook Political Report | Likely R | October 29, 2020 |
| Inside Elections | Safe R | October 28, 2020 |
| Sabato's Crystal Ball | Likely R | November 2, 2020 |
| Daily Kos | Safe R | October 30, 2020 |
| Politico | Likely R | November 2, 2020 |
| RCP | Likely R | October 23, 2020 |
| DDHQ | Safe R | November 3, 2020 |
| 538 | Safe R | November 2, 2020 |
| Economist | Likely R | November 2, 2020 |

=== Additional general election endorsements ===
Amy McGrath (D)

U.S. Senators

- Kirsten Gillibrand, New York (2009–present); former 2020 presidential candidate
- Kamala Harris, California (2017–2021); nominee for Vice-President and former presidential candidate

U.S. Representatives

- Seth Moulton, MA-6 (2015–present)

State officials

- Andy Beshear, governor of Kentucky (2019–present)

Individuals

- Ann Coulter, media pundit (Republican)
- Alex Kurtzman, producer, writer and director

Organizations

- Joint Action Committee for Political Affairs

Unions

- International Federation of Professional and Technical Engineers
- Kentucky AFL-CIO
- National Education Association
- Service Employees International Union 1199 WV/KY/OH
- United Auto Workers

=== Fundraising ===
Campaign finance reports as of December 31, 2020
| Candidate | Raised | Spent | Cash on hand |
|---|---|---|---|
| Mitch McConnell (R) | $73,952,186 | $67,388,725 | $6,811,701 |
| Amy McGrath (D) | $96,331,682 | $92,942,100 | $3,389,583 |
| Barron Bradley (L) | $126,595 | $115,857 | $12,811 |
Source: Federal Election Commission

=== Polling ===
View source data.

| Poll source | Date(s) administered | Sample size | Margin of error | Mitch McConnell (R) | Amy McGrath (D) | Brad Barron (L) | Other / Undecided |
|---|---|---|---|---|---|---|---|
| Swayable | October 23 – November 1, 2020 | 365 (LV) | ± 7.9% | 49% | 46% | 5% | – |
| Morning Consult | October 22–31, 2020 | 911 (LV) | ± 3% | 51% | 40% | – | – |
| Bluegrass Community & Technical College | October 12–28, 2020 | 250 (RV) | – | 50% | 40% | – | 10% (Note: Undecided with 10%) |
| Cygnal | October 19–20, 2020 | 640 (LV) | ± 3.9% | 50% | 40% | 5% | 5% (Note: Undecided with 5%) |
| Mason-Dixon | October 12–15, 2020 | 625 (LV) | ± 4% | 51% | 42% | 4% | 3% (Note: Undecided with 3%) |
| Morning Consult | September 11–20, 2020 | 746 (LV) | ± (2% – 7%) | 52% | 37% | – | – |
| Data for Progress (D) | September 14–19, 2020 | 807 (LV) | ± 3.5% | 46% (Note: Standard VI response) | 39% | 3% | 12% (Note: Undecided with 12%) |
| Data for Progress (D) | September 14–19, 2020 | 807 (LV) | ± 3.5% | 48% (Note: If only McConnell and McGrath were candidates) | 41% | – | 11% (Note: Undecided with 11%) |
| Quinnipiac University | September 10–14, 2020 | 1,164 (LV) | ± 2.9% | 53% | 41% | – | 5% (Note: "Someone else" with 1%; Undecided with 4%) |
| Quinnipiac University | July 30 – August 3, 2020 | 909 (RV) | ± 3.3% | 49% | 44% | – | 7% (Note: "Someone else" and would not vote with 1%; Undecided with 5%) |
| Bluegrass Data (D) (Note: This poll's sponsor, Ditch Mitch Fund, supported the electoral defeat of Mitch McConnell prior to the sampling period) | July 25–29, 2020 | 3,020 (RV) | ± 2.0% | 49% | 46% | 4% | – |
| Morning Consult | July 24 – August 2, 2020 | 793 (LV) | ± 3.0% | 53% | 36% | – | 12% (Note: "Someone else" and Undecided with 6%) |
| Spry Strategies (R) (Note: This poll's sponsor is the American Principles Project, a 501 that supports the Republican Party.) | July 11–16, 2020 | 600 (LV) | ± 3.7% | 55% | 33% | – | 12% |
| Garin-Hart-Yang Research (D) | July 7–12, 2020 | 800 (LV) | ± 3.5% | 45% | 41% | 7% | 7% (Note: Undecided with 7%) |
| Civiqs/Data for Progress | June 13–15, 2020 | 898 (RV) | ± 3.8% | 53% | 33% | 4% | 11% (Note: "someone else" with 8%; undecided with 3%) |
| RMG Research (Note: Poll sponsored by U.S. Term Limits, a PAC supporting candidates who support term limits in Congress.) | May 21–24, 2020 | 500 (RV) | ± 4.5% | 40% | 41% | – | 19% (Note: Undecided with 10%; "Some other candidate" with 9%) |
| Bluegrass Data (D) | April 7–12, 2020 (Note: Additional data sourced from FiveThirtyEight) | 4,000 (RV) | – | 40% | 38% | 7% | – |
| Change Research (D) | January 17–21, 2020 | 1,281 (LV) | ± 2.8% | 41% | 41% | – | 18% |
| Garin-Hart-Yang Research (D) | January 8–13, 2020 | 802 (LV) | ± 3.5% | 43% | 40% | – | 17% |
| Fabrizio Ward (Note: Poll sponsored by AARP.) | July 29–31, 2019 | 600 (LV) | ± 4.0% | 47% | 46% | – | 6% |
| Change Research (D) | June 15–16, 2019 | 1,629 (LV) | – | 47% | 45% | – | 8% |

Hypothetical polling

with Charles Booker

| Poll source | Date(s) administered | Sample size | Margin of error | Mitch McConnell (R) | Charles Booker (D) | Other / Undecided |
|---|---|---|---|---|---|---|
| Civiqs/Data for Progress | June 13–15, 2020 | 898 (RV) | ± 3.8% | 52% | 38% | 9% (Note: Barron (L) with 4%; "someone else" with 2%; undecided with 3%) |

with Jim Gray

| Poll source | Date(s) administered | Sample size | Margin of error | Mitch McConnell (R) | Jim Gray (D) | Undecided |
|---|---|---|---|---|---|---|
| Gravis Marketing | June 11–12, 2019 | 741 (LV) | ± 3.6% | 49% | 41% | 10% |

with Generic Democrat

| Poll source | Date(s) administered | Sample size | Margin of error | Mitch McConnell (R) | Generic Democrat | Other / Undecided |
|---|---|---|---|---|---|---|
| Public Policy Polling | May 14–15, 2020 | 1,104 (V) | – | 47% | 44% | 9% |
| Public Policy Polling (D) (Note: Poll sponsored by The Ditch Mitch Fund) | Feb 11–12, 2019 | 748 (RV) | ± 3.6% | 45% | 42% | 12% |
| Public Policy Polling (D) (Note: Poll sponsored by Our Lives on the Line) | Aug 15–16, 2017 | 645 (V) | – | 37% | 44% | 19% |

on whether Mitch McConnell deserves to be re-elected

| Poll source | Date(s) administered | Sample size | Margin of error | Yes | No | Other / Undecided |
|---|---|---|---|---|---|---|
| Fabrizio Ward/AARP | July 29–31, 2019 | 600 (LV) | ± 4.0% | 31% | 62% | 8% (Note: Undecided with 7%; "refused" with 1%) |
| Public Policy Polling (D) | Feb 11–12, 2019 | 748 (RV) | ± 3.6% | 32% | 61% | 8% |

with Generic Republican and Generic Democrat

| Poll source | Date(s) administered | Sample size | Margin of error | Generic Republican | Generic Democrat | Other / Undecided |
|---|---|---|---|---|---|---|
| Cygnal | October 19–20, 2020 | 640 (LV) | ± 3.9% | 55% | 39% | 6% (Note: Undecided with 6%) |
| Quinnipiac University | September 10–14, 2020 | 1,164 (LV) | ± 2.9% | 54% | 38% | 8% (Note: Undecided with 8%) |
| Fabrizio Ward/AARP | July 29–31, 2019 | 600 (LV) | ± 4.0% | 48% | 42% | 13% (Note: Undecided with 10%; "don't know/refused" with 3%) |

=== Results ===
McConnell was announced as the winner on November 3. When pressed for a potential recount of the election amid legal disputes regarding the general, McConnell dismissed the idea; he said, "At the risk of bragging, it wasn't very close." He won the election by nearly 20%.

2020 United States Senate election in Kentucky
| Party | Candidate | Votes | % | ±% |
|---|---|---|---|---|
| Republican | Mitch McConnell (incumbent) | 1,233,315 | 57.76% | +1.57% |
| Democratic | Amy McGrath | 816,257 | 38.23% | −2.49% |
| Libertarian | Brad Barron | 85,386 | 4.00% | +0.92% |
| Write-in | | 99 | 0.01% | -0.00% |
| Total votes | | 2,135,057 | 100.00% | N/A |
| Republican hold | | | | |

Counties that flipped from Democratic to Republican

- Bath (largest municipality: Owingsville)
- Elliott (largest municipality: Sandy Hook)
- Marion (largest municipality: Lebanon)
- Menifee (largest municipality: Frenchburg)
- Nicholas (largest municipality: Carlisle)
- Rowan (largest municipality: Morehead)
- Wolfe (largest municipality: Campton)

==== By congressional district ====
McConnell won five of Kentucky's six congressional districts.

| District | McConnell | McGrath | Representative |
|---|---|---|---|
| 1st | 67% | 28% | James Comer |
| 2nd | 62% | 33% | Brett Guthrie |
| 3rd | 37% | 61% | John Yarmuth |
| 4th | 60% | 36% | Thomas Massie |
| 5th | 74% | 22% | Hal Rogers |
| 6th | 51% | 46% | Andy Barr |

== Analysis ==
McGrath raised a record-setting $94 million for her campaign. She raised $63 million more than any prior candidate had ever raised for a Kentucky political campaign. According to New Republic, she outraised McConnell by $27 million. According to The Hill, she outraised McConnell by more than $32 million.

Michael Sokolove of New Republic asserted that "Amy McGrath and other Senate candidates deceived donors to rake in far more cash than their Republican opponents. They got crushed anyway".

== See also ==
- 2020 Kentucky elections

== Notes ==
Partisan clients

Voter samples
