= FreakingNews =

Photoshop contest website, founded 2002

- Former official logo of FreakingNews in October 2003
- Website type: Online community, Photoshop contest
- Available in: English
- Creator: Vladislav Golunov
- Website: www.freakingnews.com
- Commercial: No
- Registration: Optional
- Launched: August 2, 2002; 24 years ago
- Current status: Offline
- Written in: Active Server Pages

FreakingNews was a news-oriented Photoshop contest website that came online August 2, 2002 and officially opened on October 23, 2003, as a sister site of Worth1000. The virtual community of 17,000+ digital artists and members featured free daily Photoshop contests that were fueled by global news and events. FreakingNews was featured on television shows, magazines and newspapers, including Comedy Central, MTV, Weekly World News, Glenn Beck Show, Stern Magazine, The Guardian, The Daily News, The Dallas Morning News, and the Los Angeles Times. The site closed in 2020.

== History ==
Founder Vladislav Golunov and Rich Taylor became online friends in 2001 after Golunov contacted Taylor after he had seen a photo-manipulated image that Taylor had created under the pseudonym Internet screenname "Registered". Golunov had an existing website that posted humorous images with the visitor being able to leave comments or share the images via email. Taylor's news based parody and satire images have been circulated and often thought to be real by Internet users that had received them, primarily via email or posted in online forums. During one subsequent conversation, Taylor mentioned to Golunov that he wished there existed a community of Photoshoppers that would create, or "chop" images based on current news stories. Following this discussion, Golunov registered the domain and called the site "FreakingNews", as a mockery of "breaking news". Golunov bought the edited code for Photoshop contests from Worth1000—by then an already established Photoshop contest site. Apart from the custom code, Worth1000 played a major role in launching FreakingNews by promoting it to its member artists.

In April 2017, Golunov handed over the site to a new owner.

== Google Jet hoax ==
On December 6, 2007, Fox News showed the picture of the Google Jet Boeing 767, Page and Brin's personal plane, without realizing that the picture was a photo hoax created by a FreakingNews member for one of the Photoshop contests. Three months earlier, aviation news site Plane Nation, featured the same hoax image as a real photo in their article about the Google Jet Boeing 767. The Business Insider website also published this image on June 4, 2008.

== Dora the Explorer mugshot controversy ==
In May 2010 an edited image of Dora the Explorer, depicting her in a mugshot created by FreakingNews member "AndWhat" (Debbie Groben) for a FreakingNews Photoshop contest, was featured in the newspapers, magazines, and TV programs in light of the Arizona's Immigration Law debate. This mugshot image was used in the public rallies and was met with a lot of controversy, revealing some Americans' attitudes about race, immigrants and where some of immigration reform debate may be headed.

== See also ==
- Fark
- Image editing
- Photo manipulation
