= Ric Romero =

American reporter (active 1977–2015)

- Born: Los Angeles, California, U.S.
- Education: San José State University
- Occupations: Newscaster, radio personality, flight attendant
- Years active: 1977—2015
- Known for: Internet celebrity via Fark; consumer reporting
- Children: 3

Ric Romero was the consumer reporter for KABC, a television station in the U.S. city of Los Angeles. He retired on November 25, 2015.

Romero was born in Los Angeles and grew up in the San Fernando Valley, Romero graduated from San José State University with a degree in Broadcasting and Business and a minor in Theatre Arts. During the 1970s, he was one of the first male flight attendants for Pan American Airlines, describing the travel and the job as "an experience we'll never forget." Later, he was a professional performer until he accepted a position at KNTV-TV in San Jose, California in 1977. His first on-camera job came in 1982 as the host of PM Magazine at KUTV in Salt Lake City, Utah. In 1985, he became an investigative reporter at KPNX-TV in Phoenix, Arizona, from which he moved on to KABC.

Romero anchored regular segments on the 5 pm and 11 pm newscasts, and his pieces were rebroadcast on the 11 am newscast. Romero's consumer work often focused on technology and the Internet, explaining concepts to "newbies" in simple language.

== Internet notoriety ==
Romero became a FARK cliché in October 2005 after his article effusing about the phenomenon of blogging was posted to KABC's site, several years after blogs became widely popular. Romero's name is usually attached to an article where he (or another author) reports on a fad or cultural phenomenon that has long since passed the point of being newsworthy, or is very obvious.

On December 7, 2009, Drew Curtis discovered Romero's Facebook fan page, which led Ric to ask the Farkers who joined his new Facebook page to donate to the Spark of Love Toy Drive, which subsequently resulted in 582 online donations totaling $13,659.20 (as of December 16, 2009). Romero thanked the Fark community on the news for their donations, and recognized his status as a Farkism, also reporting the "breaking news" that "Water is Wet."
