= Photoshop contest =

Online game about image editing

A Photoshop contest, or sometimes Photoshop battle (often abbreviated to PS Battle), is an online game, in which a website or user of an Internet forum will post a starting image — usually a photograph — and ask others to manipulate the image using some graphics editing software, usually Adobe Photoshop, however other editors are commonly allowed, such as Corel Photo-Paint, GIMP, PaintShop Pro, Paint.NET or even Microsoft Paint. People can also use video editing software to create these images, such as Adobe Premiere Pro, Kdenlive, OpenShot, or NCH VideoPad.

While Photoshop is the industry standard image editing program, Adobe Systems, the publisher of Photoshop, discourages use of "Photoshop" to refer to anything other than their photo editing software, to prevent their trademark from becoming generic.

== Humor ==
A large part of the humor in many of these contests involves the use of internet memes.

Such contests have recently seen increasing participation on many blogs and forums. The popular internet community Reddit has a community called r/photoshopbattles devoted to the contests.

A more "underground" variety of these image manipulation jokes involves the blending of celebrity faces with nude or pornographic images commonly known as fake nudes, often combined with references to movies, music, magazines and other forms of related popular culture.

== Photoshop tennis ==
Photoshop tennis (also known as Photoshop Pong or Photoshop battle (similar in its function to a "DJ battle" or "rap battle" in hip hop music) is a game played through sequential alternating (photoshopping) of an image. Photoshop tennis originated in graphics-related internet forums in the late-1990s/early-2000s, and shares an earlier history with online image games such as SITO's "PANIC" (started January, 1994). The game was made popular by art director Jim Coudal in 2001 as "Photoshop Tennis". The matches on coudal.com were later renamed Layer Tennis after enabling the use of other software, and continued through four seasons of competition.

Each match tennis is generally played with two competing players. The players pick a starting image, or one is "served" by a player, then another player makes some sort of alteration to the image in any chosen image editor (matches are not exclusive to Adobe Photoshop). They then send the altered image to the other player or players, usually via e-mail or by posting the image to a Photoshop tennis forum, who then edits that image and sends it back to the first player. This process goes back and forth until a predetermined number of rounds have elapsed, or the players otherwise wish to end the game. When the final round is over, there may be an independent judge who determines who has played the best shots, and declares that person the winner, or players may play without a clear winner. Sometimes extra rules can be enforced, such as sticking to one particular software package, or keeping to a particular theme.

== Pictures ==
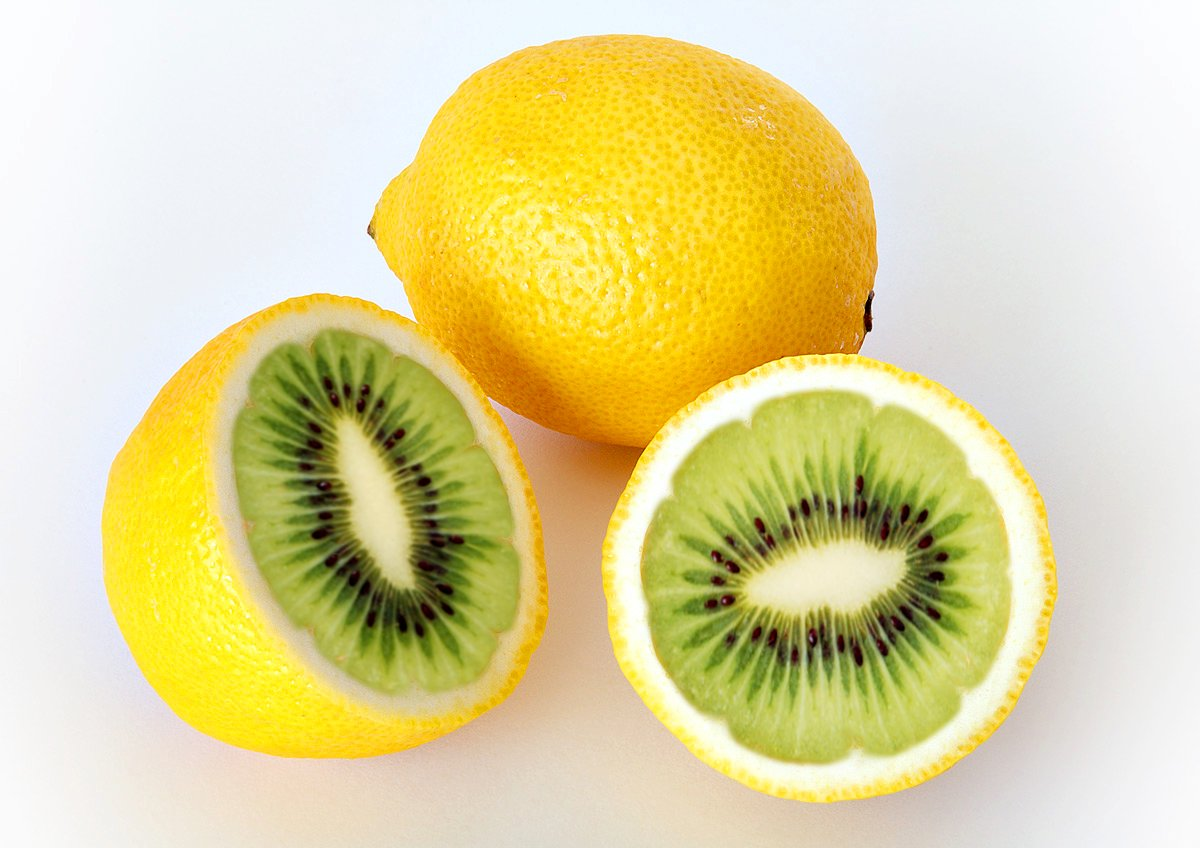
Photomontage made using GIMP.

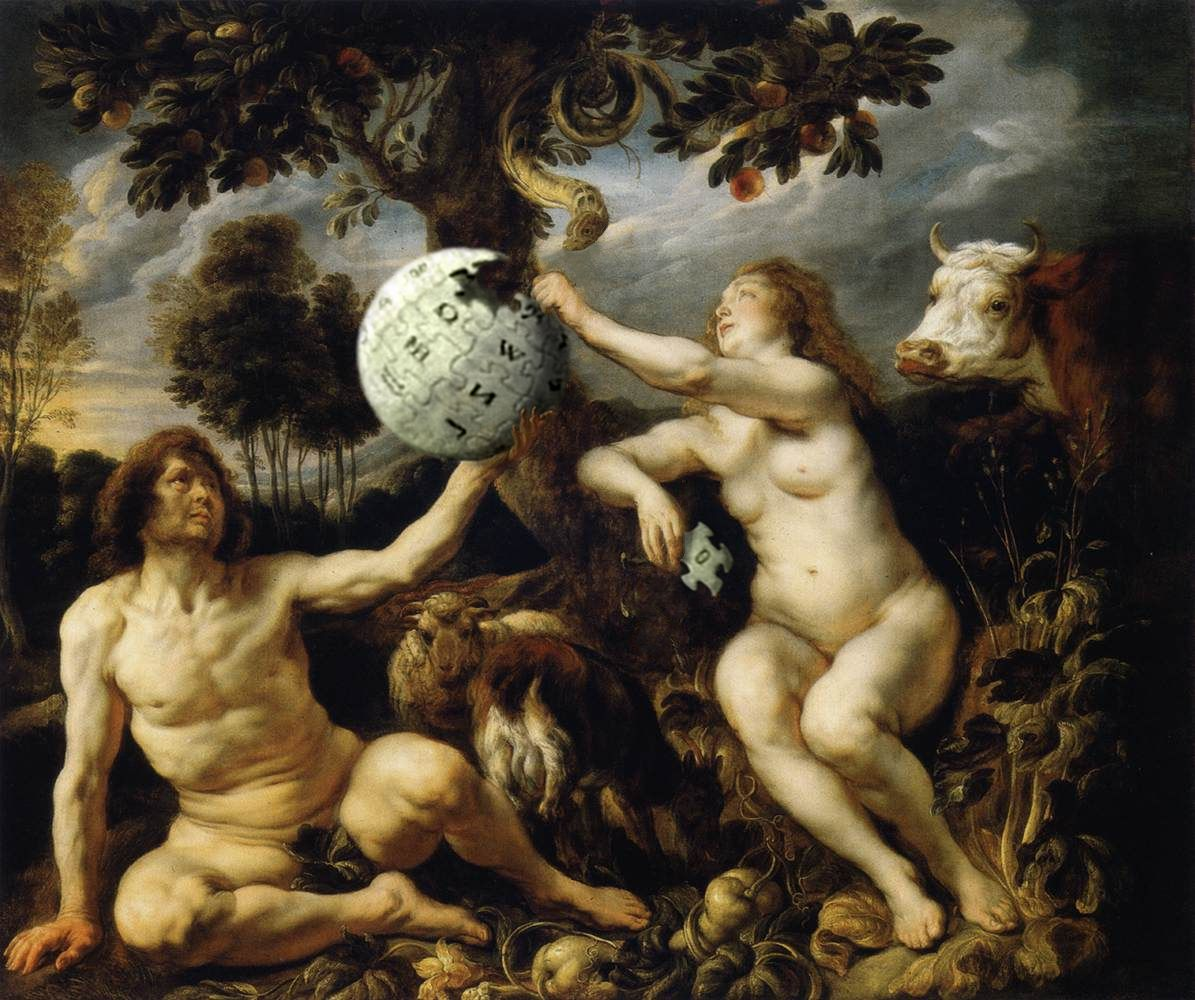
Détournement of Jacob Jordaens' The Fall of Man, made using GIMP.

== See also ==
- Adobe Photoshop
- Photomontage
- Email art
- Fark
- Photo editing (disambiguation)
- Something Awful's "Photoshop Phriday"
- Worth1000
- FreakingNews
