= Muchnick =

Muchnick is a surname. Notable people with the name include:

- Avi Muchnick (born 1979), artist, author, programmer and entrepreneur
- Isadore H. Y. Muchnick (1908–1963), American politician
- Sam Muchnick (1905–1998), American professional wrestling promoter
- Steven Muchnick (1945–2020), computer science researcher and author

== See also ==
- Reed Elsevier, Inc. v. Muchnick, 559 U.S. 154 (2010), case involving copyright law
- Sam Muchnick Memorial Tournament
