= Matt Bevin =

Governor of Kentucky from 2015 to 2019

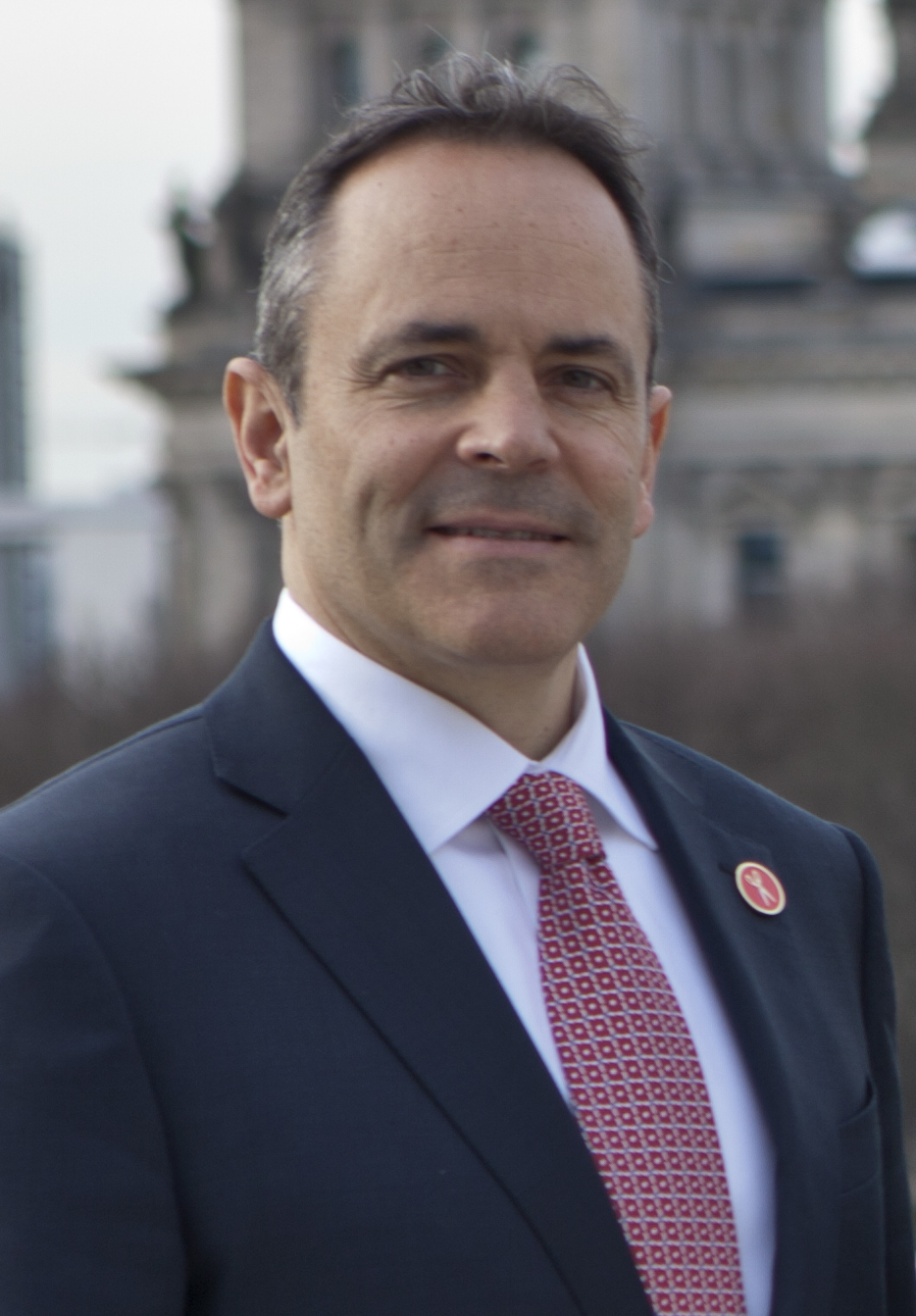
- Bevin in 2017

62nd Governor of Kentucky
- In office December 8, 2015 – December 10, 2019
- Lieutenant: Jenean Hampton
- Preceded by: Steve Beshear
- Succeeded by: Andy Beshear

Personal details
- Born: Matthew Griswold Bevin; January 9, 1967 (age 59) Denver, Colorado, U.S.
- Party: Republican
- Spouse: Glenna Bevin (m. 1996; div. 2025)
- Children: 10 (4 adopted)
- Education: Washington and Lee University (BA); Central Michigan University (attended)
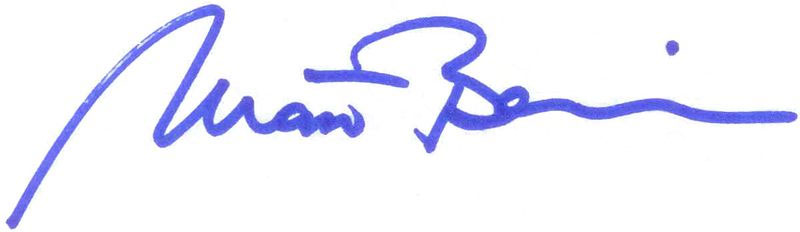
- Signature
- Website: Campaign website

Military service
- Allegiance: United States
- Branch/service: United States Army
- Years of service: 1989–1993
- Rank: Captain
- Unit: 5th Infantry Division

Matthew Griswold Bevin (/ˈbɛvɪn/; born January 9, 1967) is an American businessman and politician. A member of the Republican Party, he served as the 62nd governor of Kentucky from 2015 to 2019, losing re-election in 2019 to Democrat Andy Beshear. He is the CEO of Neuronetrix Solutions, LLC.

Born in Denver, Colorado, and raised in Shelburne, New Hampshire, Bevin earned a bachelor's degree at Washington and Lee University in 1989. He served four years in the U.S. Army and attained the rank of captain. Bevin moved to Louisville, Kentucky, in 1999 while working in the financial management industry. He later took over leadership of the Connecticut-based family business, Bevin Brothers Manufacturing Company, one of the last remaining American bell foundries. He launched a primary challenge against Kentucky's senior U.S. senator, Mitch McConnell, in 2014, but lost by almost 25 percentage points.

Bevin announced he would seek the governorship in 2015 and won the four-way Republican primary by 83 votes. He defeated the state's attorney general, Democratic nominee Jack Conway, in the general election. During his tenure as governor, Bevin enacted right-to-work legislation, laws restricting abortion, and a law allowing the carrying of concealed handguns without permits. He also attempted to reverse Kentucky's Medicaid expansion. As governor, Bevin made headlines for his criticism of school teachers and for teacher demonstrations against his efforts to cut pensions in public education. Bevin lost his re-election campaign to Kentucky attorney general Andy Beshear in a close race. After requesting a recount, Bevin conceded the election on November 14, 2019.

Bevin was widely criticized for pardoning hundreds of criminals in his last days in office, including several people convicted of serious violent crimes and a convicted child rapist whose relatives donated $4,000 to Bevin's campaign from a fundraiser to free him. On December 23, 2019, it was reported that the FBI had questioned state representative Chris Harris about Bevin's pardons and on January 2, 2020, Attorney General Daniel Cameron asked the FBI to investigate the pardons.

== Early life and education ==
Born January 9, 1967, in Denver, Colorado, Matt Bevin was the second of six children of Avery and Louise Bevin. He grew up in the rural town of Shelburne, New Hampshire. His father worked in a wood mill and his mother worked part-time in a hospital admissions department. The family raised livestock and grew much of their own food. At age six, Bevin made money selling seeds to his neighbors. He has credited his involvement in 4-H, where he served as president of the local and county chapters and as a member of the state teen council, with developing his public speaking and leadership skills. Bevin was also involved with the county's Dairy Club.

Bevin attended a small Christian school and later enrolled as a student at Gould Academy, a private high school across the state line in Bethel, Maine, in the tenth grade. His tuition was paid by financial aid and work as a campus dish washer and various summer jobs. After graduation, Bevin attended Washington and Lee University in Lexington, Virginia, on a partial ROTC scholarship. He studied abroad in Japan and became fluent in Japanese. He earned a Bachelor of Arts in East Asian Studies in 1989.

After taking eight weeks off to complete a 3,800-mile (6,100 km) bicycle ride from Oregon to Florida, Bevin enlisted in the U.S. Army and was commissioned as a second lieutenant. In 1990, he completed a six-week Junior Officer Maintenance Course at Fort Knox in Kentucky. He later commented that the area reminded him of where he grew up and that if he had a chance to raise a family there, he would like to do so. Bevin was assigned to the 25th Field Artillery Regiment of the Army's 5th Mechanized Infantry Division at Fort Polk in Louisiana. He also trained at Fort Sill in Oklahoma, completing 40 credit hours of Central Michigan University coursework offered on base. He rose to the rank of captain – earning the Army Achievement Medal, National Defense Service Medal, Army Service Ribbon, Parachutist Badge, and Army Commendation Medal with one Oak Leaf Cluster – before joining the Army Reserve in 1993. He left the Individual Ready Reserve in 2003.

== Business career ==
After leaving active duty in 1993, Bevin worked as a financial consultant for SEI Investments Company in Pennsylvania and Boston, then served as a vice president with Putnam Investments. In 1999, he was offered a stake in National Asset Management and moved to Kentucky to take the job. After the firm was sold in 2003, Bevin recruited a group of managers from National City Corp. to found Integrity Asset Management. The company was handling more than $1 billion in investments when Bevin sold it to Munder Capital Management of Michigan in 2011.

In 2008, Bevin took over management of the struggling Bevin Brothers Manufacturing Company of East Hampton, Connecticut. Founded in 1832 by Bevin's great-great-great-grandfather and remaining in the family continuously since, Bevin Bros. is the last American company that exclusively manufactures bells. Collectively, the family decided that Bevin was the family member who could keep the company solvent. There are indications that Bevin became the company's president in 2008, though he says it was in 2011. By 2012, the company's delinquent taxes had been paid.

A lightning strike sparked a fire that destroyed the factory on May 27, 2012. Although he carried little more than liability insurance on the business and his losses were compounded by looters who stole 4,500 bells, Bevin vowed to rebuild, telling the Hartford Courant, "I'm a Bevin, and Bevins make bells." In late June 2012, Connecticut Governor Dannel Malloy announced that Bevin Brothers would receive $100,000 in grants from the state's Small Business Express program to assist in the rebuilding effort. Flanked by Senator Richard Blumenthal, Bevin announced in July 2012 that he would sell souvenirs including T-shirts, and bells and bricks salvaged from the gutted factory, to raise additional funds for rebuilding. Working from a temporary location, the company resumed limited production in September 2012.

Bevin is a partner at Waycross Partners, an investment management firm in Louisville, Kentucky.

In November 2022, Bevin was named the chief executive officer of Neuronetrix Solutions, LLC.

Bevin said that in 2011, Mitch McConnell recruited him to challenge incumbent Democrat John Yarmuth to represent Kentucky's 3rd congressional district in 2012. McConnell's chief of staff said Bevin requested the meeting and McConnell never asked Bevin to enter the race. Ultimately, Bevin and his advisors decided that legislative redistricting had made Yarmuth's district unwinnable for a Republican, and Bevin chose not to run.

== 2014 U.S. Senate campaign ==
On July 24, 2013, Bevin announced that he would challenge McConnell, the Senate Minority Leader and a five-term incumbent, in the 2014 Republican primary because he did not believe that McConnell was conservative enough. Despite a Wenzel Strategies poll immediately following Bevin's announcement that showed him polling only 19.9% to McConnell's 58.9%, the National Journal listed McConnell ninth on its list of ten lawmakers who could lose a primary election in 2014.

=== McConnell's challenges ===
McConnell launched ads accusing Bevin of taking taxpayer bailouts, citing his acceptance of state grants to rebuild Bevin Brothers. Bevin responded with ads accusing McConnell of voting for higher taxes, government bailouts, increases in the debt ceiling, and confirmation of liberal judicial nominees. McConnell's next ad featured Bevin telling an audience "I have no tax delinquency problem, nor have I ever," then claimed his businesses had failed to pay taxes eight times and Bevin was late on a tax payment on his $1.2 million vacation home in Greenwood, Maine, in 2007. PolitiFact.com rated the ad "Mostly False", saying that Bevin Brothers incurred the delinquent taxes in 2008 and the second quarter of 2009, when the extent of Bevin's involvement with the company was "unclear". Regarding the vacation home, PolitiFact noted that Bevin's escrow company changed in 2007, and the new company failed to pay the property taxes on the home from escrow on time. Town records show that the taxes were paid by February 2009, and Bevin had paid them on-time every year before and after 2007. McConnell's third ad in as many weeks targeted Bevin for falsely claiming on his LinkedIn page that he attended a seminar affiliated with the Massachusetts Institute of Technology. The three-year program, which Bevin attended from 2006 to 2008, was actually sponsored by the MIT Enterprise Forum, which is technically unaffiliated with MIT. The discrepancy was first reported by The Hill in March 2013, and was clarified on his LinkedIn page at that time.

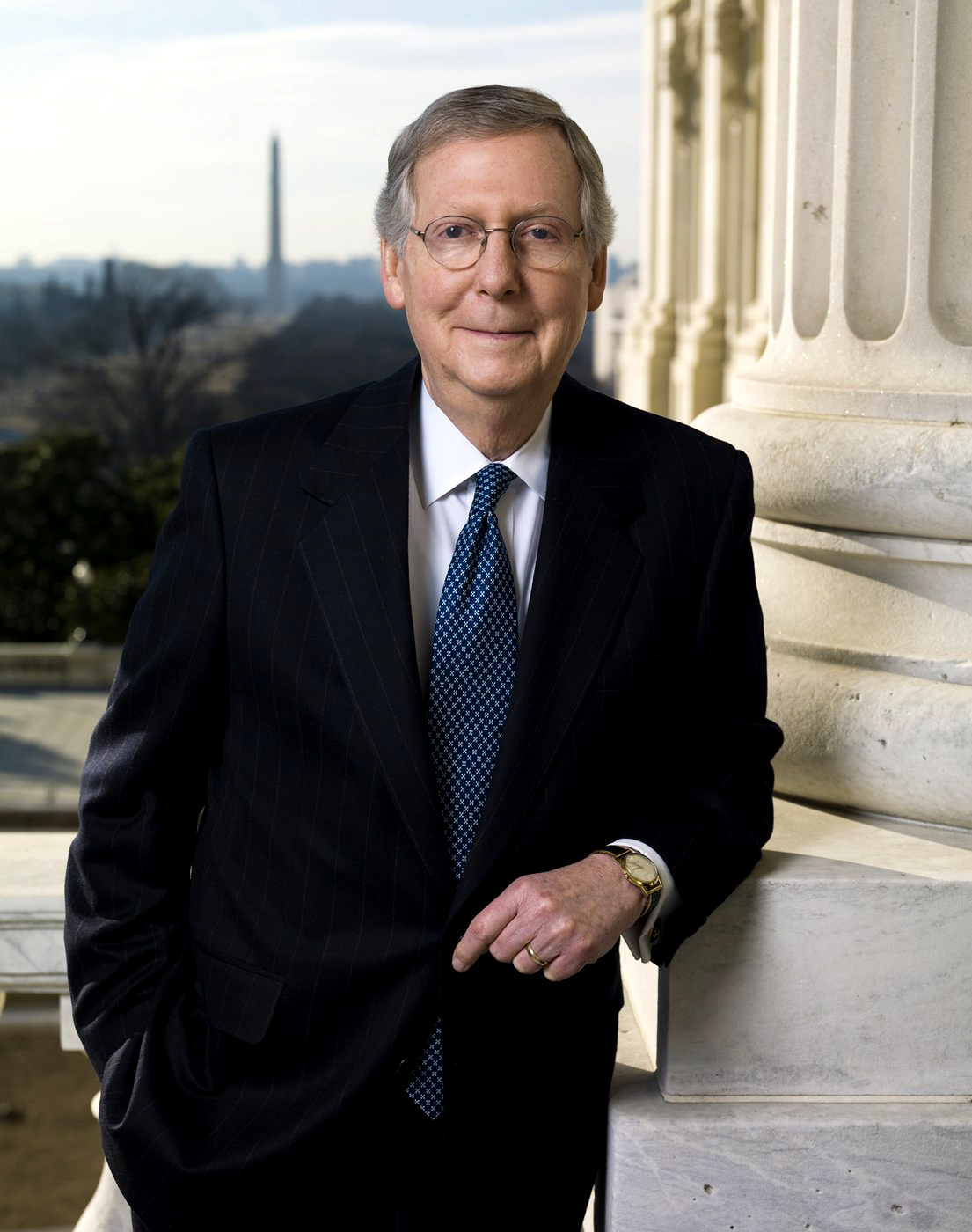
Mitch McConnell, Bevin's opponent in the 2014 Republican Senate primary

By mid-October 2013, McConnell's campaign indicated it would look beyond Bevin and focus its advertising against Alison Lundergan Grimes, the frontrunner in the race for the Democratic senatorial nomination, calling her "my real opponent". In the aftermath of McConnell negotiating a deal to end the 16-day government shutdown in 2013, the Senate Conservatives Fund endorsed Bevin. McConnell's campaign then launched another ad, based on a story published by BuzzFeed, claiming Bevin had failed to disclose a federal tax lien when applying for the state grant to rebuild his family business, which could be a Class A misdemeanor, punishable by up to a year in jail and a $2,000 fine under Connecticut law. Bevin said that he had been paying the lien in $5,000 installments prior to the fire that destroyed the business, a condition he said was allowed by the grant application, but after the fire, the Internal Revenue Service suspended the payments. Bevin was never charged. Lexington Herald-Leader columnist Sam Youngman speculated that McConnell's pivot back to Bevin was a proxy war against Tea Party fundraising groups, hoping that a decisive win over their chosen candidate in the primary would hamper the groups' fundraising in future elections.

=== Tea Party support ===
During the campaign, Bevin criticized the Affordable Care Act and called for repealing it in its entirety. His proposed alternatives included allowing insurance providers to compete across state lines, capping damages awarded for pain and suffering, allowing individuals to purchase health insurance with pre-tax earnings, and providing federal block grants to states to allow them to cover individuals with pre-existing conditions. He opposed tax increases and the allocation of federal earmarks. He called for massive spending cuts in the federal bureaucracy, specifically the Department of Education and the Veterans Administration, and for reforming eligibility requirements for entitlement programs, including raising age requirements, imposing means tests, and ending federal benefits to illegal immigrants. He opposed U.S. intervention in the Syrian Civil War and the disbursement of foreign aid to countries that deny basic freedoms to their citizens or are guilty of human rights violations. He opposed federal agribusiness subsidies and warrantless federal surveillance and called for simplifying the child adoption process. Endorsed by Gun Owners of America, he pledged to resist any restrictions on the types of guns or ammunition that citizens could purchase. A supporter of congressional term limits, Bevin signed a pledge authored by the non-profit U.S. Term Limits stating that, if elected, he would co-sponsor and vote for a bill restricting individuals to three terms in the U.S. House of Representatives and two terms in the U.S. Senate.

Bevin complained that McConnell refused to speak at any Lincoln Day events around the state if Bevin was also invited to speak at the event. McConnell also steadfastly refused to participate in any formal debates with Bevin, although his campaign manager, Jesse Benton, debated Bevin at a Constitution Day event at the University of Kentucky in September 2013.

In January 2014, the conservative Madison Project political action committee announced it would open field offices in Louisville, Florence, Owensboro, Glasgow and Bowling Green from which to launch get-out-the-vote efforts on Bevin's behalf. The group also sponsored billboard advertising criticizing McConnell in the heavily Republican counties of Clay, Laurel, Madison, Pulaski and Whitley. Bevin was endorsed by FreedomWorks and conservative talk radio hosts Mark Levin and Glenn Beck.

In February 2014, Politico reported that in October 2008, Bevin had signed a report for his investment fund that praised the federal Troubled Asset Relief Program (TARP) and the government takeover of Fannie Mae and Freddie Mac. During the campaign, Bevin criticized McConnell for voting in favor of those actions as a senator. When Beck asked Bevin about the issue during an interview, Bevin said the content of the report had been written by the fund's chief investment officer, and that he had only signed it because he was legally required to do so as president of the fund. Later, Bevin added that he had not physically signed the letter, but that his signature was added to the document digitally. Lawyers interviewed by the Lexington Herald-Leader said it would have been legal for Bevin to change the content of the letter, but not the accompanying facts and financial data. The Herald-Leader noted that Bevin had not signed some previous investor letters. His campaign offered no explanation for the inconsistency.

Both Bevin and McConnell were critical of a February 2014 ruling by U.S. District Judge John G. Heyburn II that held that an amendment to the Kentucky Constitution banning same-sex marriage violated the Fourteenth Amendment of the U.S. Constitution. Bevin pointed out that Heyburn once worked for McConnell, who supported his nomination to the bench by President George H. W. Bush.

=== Cockfighting rally incident ===
On April 2, 2014, the News Journal reported that Bevin spoke at a pro-cockfighting rally in Corbin, Kentucky. Asked about his attendance, Bevin said he understood that the rally was a states' rights event: "I was the first person to speak and then I left." Organizers of the event, which was closed to the media, said there was "never any ambiguity" regarding its purpose, and WAVE in Louisville published an undercover video from the event showing that Bevin was the third speaker; the speaker who immediately preceded Bevin said the rally was held "for the sole purpose of legalizing gamecock fighting at the state level." Bevin told a WAVE reporter, "I honestly wasn't even paying attention. I was thinking about what I was going to say. I don't even remember him saying that." The WAVE video also showed an attendee asking Bevin if he would support the legalization of cockfighting in Kentucky, to which he replied, "I support the people of Kentucky exercising their right, because it is our right to decide what it is that we want to do, and not the federal government's. Criminalizing behavior, if it's part of the heritage of this state, is in my opinion a bad idea. A bad idea. I will not support it." Bevin was referencing the Agricultural Act of 2014, commonly called the "farm bill", which contained a provision that criminalized spectators at cockfighting events.

Scott Lasley, a political science professor at Western Kentucky University and chairman of the Warren County Republican Party, criticized Bevin's appearance at the rally, saying, "Either they were totally unvetted and unprepared for it, which says a lot about the campaign and its ability to compete at this level, or...they think that message is going to be receptive. Otherwise you don't go there." On April 25, 2014, Bevin apologized for attending the event, saying "I am genuinely sorry that my attendance at an event which, other than my comments, appears to have primarily involved a discussion of cockfighting, has created concern on the part of many Kentucky voters. I understand that concern. I am not and have never been a supporter of cockfighting or any other forms of animal cruelty." The Daily Beast said the issue could be the "nail in the coffin" for Bevin's campaign, while The Washington Post wrote, "On its own, the cockfighting story isn't enough to sink Bevin's campaign. But viewed in the context of the string of other distractions he's had to deal with, it reinforces the reality that his campaign is in serious need of repairs down the stretch."

=== Result and aftermath ===
When Bevin told the media he would have an announcement at his campaign headquarters on April 28, speculation raged that he would drop out of the race. Instead, Bevin announced that he would release his jobs plan later in the week and chided the local media for focusing on issues other than the economy. On May 1, Bevin released the promised jobs plan, which called for a gradual reduction of the federal corporate tax rate to 10% over five years, allowing companies to return overseas profits to the United States with a 10% tax assessment, and passage of a federal right-to-work law. Saying that burdensome regulations from agencies like the Environmental Protection Agency were harmful to business' ability to create jobs, he endorsed the REINS Act, which would require congressional approval of any executive regulation with an economic impact of more than $100 million. He also proposed a flat income tax and opposed an increase in the federal minimum wage.

Concerned about a divide in the party costing the party McConnell's seat in the general election, the Republican Party of Kentucky asked both candidates to sign a pledge to support the party's eventual nominee in the general election. McConnell signed the pledge, but Bevin did not. All Republican members of Kentucky's congressional caucus joined McConnell in signing the pledge except 4th District congressman Thomas Massie, a legislator aligned with the Tea Party.

On election day, Bevin garnered 125,759 votes – 35.4% of the vote – to McConnell's 213,666 votes (60.2%); the remaining votes were scattered among three lower-profile candidates. In his concession speech, Bevin opined "there is zero chance that the solutions for what ails us is going to come from the Democratic Party", but did not endorse McConnell. He appeared onstage with McConnell on a few occasions during the general election campaign but steadfastly refused to explicitly endorse him. During his remarks at an October 29 Restore America rally, Bevin said "I say with all due respect to a lot of folks who might say otherwise, sometimes we might need to get over it and move on. We have new races to run and new decisions to make. There is too much at stake." Asked if the comment amounted to an endorsement of McConnell, Bevin told reporters, "You've got ears." McConnell defeated Grimes in the general election, and Bevin eventually told reporters that he voted for McConnell.

== Governor of Kentucky (2015–2019) ==
=== 2015 gubernatorial primary ===
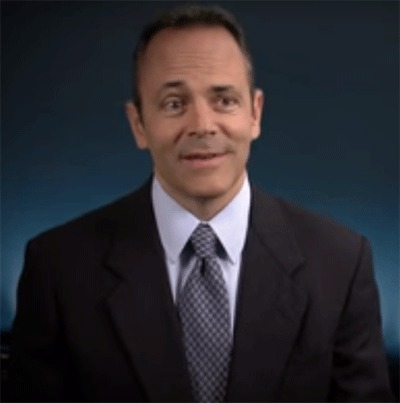
Bevin speaking in an AARP voter guide video, September 2015

In June 2014, WKMS reported that Bevin had remained politically active after his defeat by McConnell, and an email to his followers calling on Kentucky Governor Steve Beshear, a Democrat, to denounce new carbon regulations issued by the EPA fueled speculation that Bevin would seek the Republican gubernatorial nomination in 2015. The station also cited an anonymous source that said Bevin would campaign for Rand Paul's Senate seat in 2016 if Paul's expected presidential bid kept him from running for re-election. An August 2014 survey by Public Policy Polling showed that 25% of Republicans wanted Bevin to be the party's gubernatorial nominee, ahead of declared candidates James Comer (20%) and Hal Heiner (18%).

On January 27, 2015, the last day for candidates to file, Bevin announced he would seek the Republican nomination for governor. During his announcement, he introduced his running mate, Jenean Hampton, a Tea Party activist who lost her bid to unseat State Representative Jody Richards the previous year. Bevin joined a field that included Commissioner of Agriculture James Comer, former Louisville Councilman Hal Heiner, and former Kentucky Supreme Court Justice Will T. Scott. The National Journal predicted that Bevin would draw support away from Comer, the early front-runner, who had been appealing to Tea Party groups and already secured Congressman Massie's endorsement. The crowded primary was also projected to damage the Republican nominee's chances in the general election, since Attorney General Jack Conway was the only major Democratic candidate, allowing him to conserve resources for the general election. McConnell allies also predicted that Bevin's refusal to endorse McConnell would hurt him with primary voters.

==== Platform ====
Bevin's platform, "Blueprint for a Better Kentucky", centered around economic rather than social issues. The seven major themes of the platform included:

- passage of right-to-work legislation;
- eliminating the state inheritance tax and reducing personal and corporate tax rates;
- ensuring the solvency of the state pension system, including transitioning new and existing employees to 401(k) plans;
- reducing the number of state employees by 20 percent and expanding competitive bidding;
- reforming the state's education system by repealing the Common Core State Standards Initiative and allowing charter schools and school vouchers;
- ending kynect, the state's health insurance exchange, transitioning enrollees to the federal health insurance exchange, and reversing the state's expansion of Medicaid effected by Governor Beshear under the Affordable Care Act; and
- combating expanding federal influence.

Scott also advocated ending kynect, but Comer advocated maintaining and reforming it and Heiner said he opposed the Affordable Care Act, but remained non-committal on his plans for kynect. Bevin was the first of the four to advocate reversing the Medicaid expansion, telling reporters "No question about it. I would reverse that immediately. The fact that we have one out of four people in this state on Medicaid is unsustainable, it's unaffordable and we need to create jobs in this state, not more government programs to cover people."

==== Campaign advertising ====
By early April, pro-Heiner ads from Citizens for a Sound Government revived charges of taking bailouts and tax delinquency against Bevin and attacked Comer for accepting thousands of dollars in farm subsidies. Within days, the candidates appeared at a debate where Bevin challenged Heiner to publicly denounce the ads; Heiner responded with a silent smile. Bevin's public challenge to the ad prompted a Lexington television station to pull it after two weeks on the air. Bevin made a $200,000 combined television and radio ad buy to defend himself against the ads and began a telephone survey that touted his conservative credentials while highlighting Heiner's past positions on issues such as gun control before asking how these statements affect the person's view of each candidate. Heiner said the survey was a negative push poll, but Bevin insisted it was a legitimate poll. By the end of April, polls showed that Heiner's lead had evaporated and that the race was essentially a three-way dead heat between him, Bevin, and Comer.

==== Accusations against Comer ====
Less than three weeks before the primary, Comer's former girlfriend told The Courier-Journal in a letter that Comer had abused her physically and mentally in 1991 and that he had accompanied her to an abortion clinic. Other newspapers, including the Lexington Herald-Leader, which cited the Courier-Journal, then reported the allegations. The Lexington Herald-Leader had reported earlier that the Lexington-area blogger who had been publishing stories about the allegations for months had been in contact with the husband of Heiner's running mate, K. C. Crosbie.

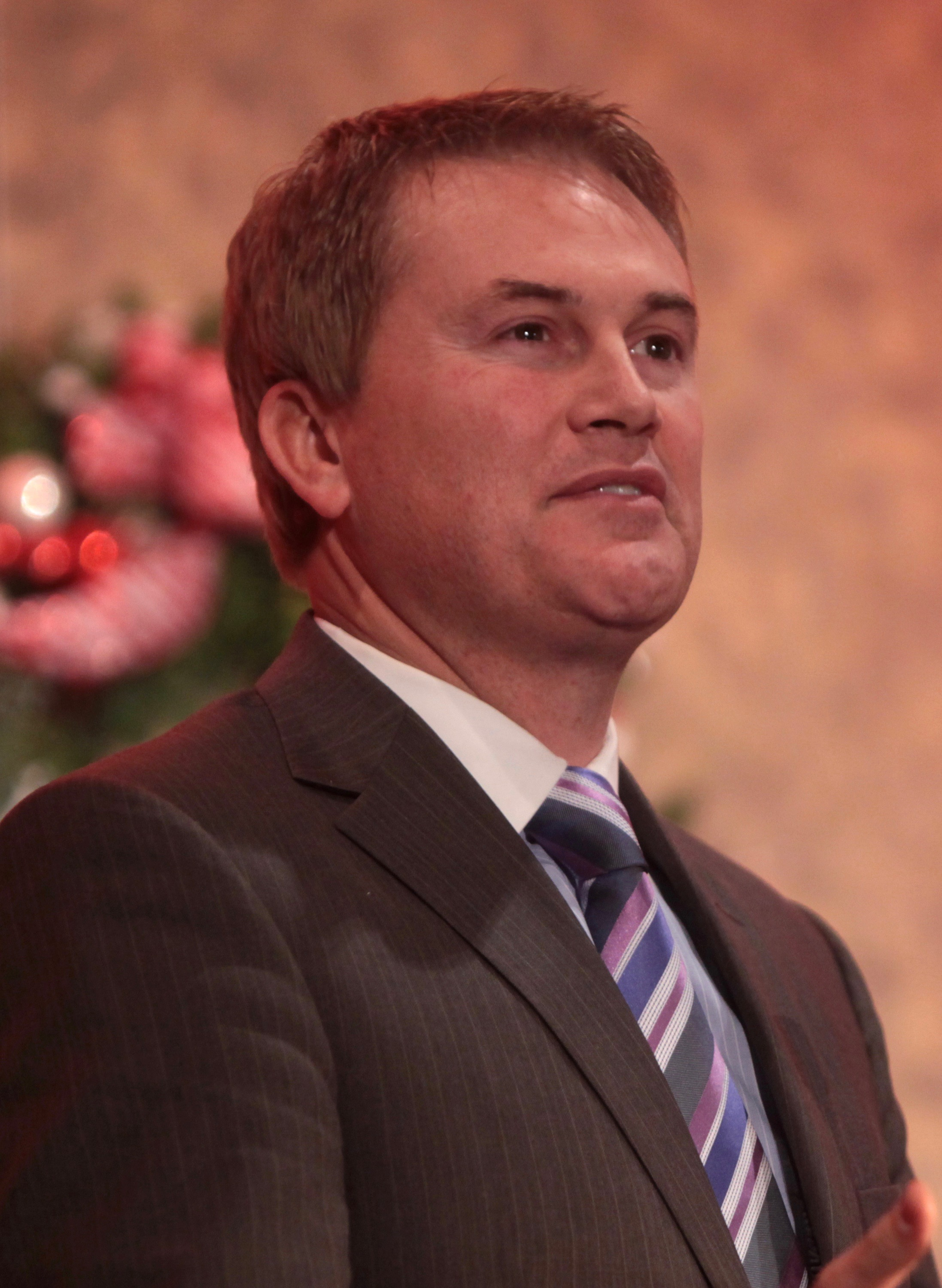
James Comer lost support in the race due to accusations by a former girlfriend.

Heiner apologized for any role members of his campaign may have had in perpetuating the accusations against Comer, but the story touched off a feud between Heiner and Comer that some analysts predicted would benefit Bevin. Bevin declared that Heiner's alleged connection to the Comer accusations had "disqualified [Heiner] from being the GOP nominee for governor". During a debate featuring all four Republican candidates on Kentucky Sports Radio, Bevin said, "I don't know if [Heiner's] behind the Comer story, but I'm telling you his people have been pushing this for a long time. And Hal himself has personally told me months and months ago before I even got in this race, that he knew things, not had heard things, that he knew things based on conversations that his people had had about Jamie Comer." Bevin also released an ad depicting Comer and Heiner as children in a food fight, with the narrator promising that Bevin would bring "grown up leadership" to the governor's race.

The first opinion poll conducted after the allegations against Comer showed Bevin leading the race with 27% support to Heiner's 26%, Comer's 25%, and Scott's 8%, with 14% still undecided. Lowell Reese, of Kentucky Roll Call, reported on September 28, 2015, that the Comer campaign had leaked to the Herald-Leader emails showing that the husband of Crosbie had been in contact with the blogger. By doing so, the campaign was able to deny the allegations of abuse that had circulated for months in Frankfort, the state capital, and put Heiner's campaign on the defensive.

==== Result and aftermath ====
Results of 2015 Kentucky gubernatorial primary
Candidate	Votes	Percentage
Matt Bevin	70,479	32.9%
James Comer	70,396	32.8%
Hal Heiner	57,948	27.1%
Will Scott	15,364	7.2%
Total	214,187	100.0%

On election night, May 19, the Associated Press reported that Bevin received 70,479 votes, just 83 more than Comer; Heiner garnered 57,948 and Scott received 15,364. At approximately 10:00 pm (EDT) that night, Comer told his supporters, "I owe it to our supporters to ask for a canvass to this election." The recanvass showed that Bevin remained 83 votes ahead, and Comer conceded the nomination to Bevin, foregoing a full recount.

Bevin financed his primary campaign with over $2.5 million of his own money, representing 95% of the money he spent, and the National Journal opined that attracting donors from supporters of Comer, Heiner, Scott, and McConnell would be critical to his success in the general election. Almost immediately after his primary win, Bevin was asked about his support for McConnell, telling reporters, "I literally know of no other elected official in this state who went to more events between May and November in support of candidates and support of Mitch McConnell and other down ticket races than I did. I knocked on doors, I made phone calls, I wrote checks myself, and I physically attended fundraiser after fundraiser." Federal Election Commission records showed no evidence of contributions by Bevin to McConnell's campaign, and a McConnell advisor cited by Bevin to corroborate his support refused to do so when contacted by Insider Louisville.

In the election's aftermath, McConnell issued a one-sentence endorsement of Bevin. Bevin deleted all posts from his Twitter feed prior to February 2015, including several critical of McConnell. At a statewide Lincoln Day dinner, Bevin showed a humorous montage of him supporting McConnell, including staged scenes of him waking up in a McConnell T-shirt, applying McConnell bumper stickers to his vehicle, and getting a "Team Mitch" tattoo. McConnell was not in attendance, but a spokesperson read a letter again endorsing Bevin. Senator Paul was in attendance and pledged to do "anything humanly possible" to elect Bevin; State Senate President Robert Stivers and State House Minority Leader Jeff Hoover, a Comer ally, both endorsed Bevin as well. Neither Comer, Heiner, nor Scott attended the dinner.

==== General election ====
In the general election, Bevin faced state Attorney General Jack Conway, marking the first gubernatorial race in state history featuring two candidates from Louisville, the state's largest city. The Kentucky Democratic Party attempted to play up the fractures in the Republican Party over Bevin's candidacy, launching a web site featuring fellow Republicans' criticisms of Bevin, drawn mostly from his primary race against McConnell. Bevin responded with a web site tying Conway to President Barack Obama, who was very unpopular in Kentucky, saying that Conway would support environmental regulations that harm the coal industry and support the Affordable Care Act, which was also unpopular in the state, despite its nationally praised insurance exchange. McConnell endorsed Bevin.

==== Fiscal issues ====
Bevin advocated shifting the state's tax code away from "productivity" taxes, such as income taxes, to "consumption taxes" such as sales taxes, a move that Conway called "regressive". He repeated his call to eliminate the inheritance tax and added that the state should "aim for" the elimination of corporate taxes. Bevin also called for the elimination of many of Kentucky's $10 billion in "tax expenditures", which he called "Frankfort-speak for loopholes". Asked to specify which expenditures he would eliminate, Bevin said, "I'm not going to give you specifics at this point in time. There are many of these loopholes that frankly are not conducive to developing the economy. There are some that make sense, and those will continue. ...[W]e have already identified what many of them will be. But at this point, we're going to have to look at them in totality. I'm not gonna give you specifics at this time. I'm just not."

During the candidates first public appearance together on June 19, 2015, Conway promised to increase funding for early childhood education and expand its availability for those in poverty. He then referenced Bevin's statements in a May Republican debate citing studies suggesting educational gains effected by the federal Head Start Program are lost by the third grade. Bevin said the state could not afford additional funding for early childhood education; he advocated outcomes-based education funding, but added, "The comment that I'm not a proponent of early childhood education is absolutely bunk, it's baloney."

In a late July debate sponsored by the Kentucky Chamber of Commerce, Bevin continued to insist that the state could not afford the Medicaid expansion authorized by Governor Beshear. He said he was "appalled that one in four Kentuckians now get their health insurance from Medicaid". He then advocated modifying the state's Medicaid system to require those insured by Medicaid to contribute small premiums or co-payments, citing a system similar to Indiana's. The Kentucky General Assembly would have to effect such changes through legislation, but the debate moderator told Bevin he could end the expansion entirely with an executive order. Bevin responded, "And create what degree of chaos?" Alessi then cited Bevin's February promise to end the Medicaid expansion "immediately", to which Bevin replied, "I said I would address it. I didn't say I would end it immediately. Go back and look at what I said." In the post-debate press conference, Lexington Herald-Leader columnist Sam Youngman confirmed that Bevin had said he would "end" the Medicaid expansion. Bevin then said, "Yeah, well, here's the bottom line: We need to address the situation. We need to effectively come up with a program that works for folks." At a September campaign stop at a local Dairy Queen, Bevin promised only to "tweak" Beshear's Medicaid expansion. Later in the month, he told a reporter "[W]e will not continue to enroll people at 138 percent of the federal poverty level [as allowed under the Affordable Care Act]," adding "The bottom line is this: Even if we don't continue to enroll people at 138 percent, there will be the 850-some odd thousand that were on it before the expansion and the other 400-and some odd thousand that are on it right now. They will continue to be on it until we come up with a solution. But we are not going to re-enroll people at 138 percent." In an email to reporters, Bevin's communications director said,

Matt has been consistent on the issue of Medicaid expansion from day one. What he has called for is repeal of Obama's Medicaid expansion by applying to [the Centers for Medicare and Medicaid Services] for 1115 waivers (as other states have successfully done) in order to better customize a solution to address the healthcare needs of the commonwealth.

==== Social issues ====
===== Marriage equality =====
Bevin said he "strongly disagreed" with the Supreme Court's decision in Obergefell v. Hodges legalizing same-sex marriage, continuing "When the definition of marriage was put on the ballot 10 years ago, 74 percent of Kentuckians made it clear that they supported only heterosexual marriage. Since that time, however, activist judges have chosen to ignore the will of the people, and to ignore the Constitutional principle of state's rights." He then attacked Conway, who refused to appeal the 2014 federal court opinion that Kentucky's defense of marriage amendment violated the federal constitution: "Jack Conway's failure to do his job and defend our laws in Kentucky disqualifies him from being elected to the office of Governor." Conway responded that he "used the discretion given to me by statute to inform Gov. Beshear and the citizens of the Commonwealth that I would not waste the scarce resources of this office pursuing a costly appeal that would not be successful." Bevin contended that Conway's decision cost Kentucky taxpayers $2.3 million, citing the cost of private attorneys that Beshear hired to defend the amendment in Conway's place.

Three Kentucky county clerks refused to issue same-sex marriage licenses in the aftermath of Obergefell, citing religious objections. Bevin criticized Beshear for not calling a special legislative session to seek a means of accommodating the clerks' objections." He advocated replacing Kentucky marriage licenses with a "marriage contract template". "The form would then be presented to those with authority to approve or solemnize a marriage contract. That duly-executed marriage contract could then be filed and recorded at the county clerk's office just like a mortgage, a lien, a deed, etc.", Bevin's public statement said.

After Rowan County clerk Kim Davis defied Judge David Bunning's order to issue marriage licenses to same-sex couples, Bevin commended her "willingness to stand for her First Amendment rights". Davis was confined to the Carter County jail for six days on contempt of court charges for refusing to comply with Bunning's order. On September 8, 2015, Bevin met with Davis in the jail and later attended a rally organized by Republican presidential candidate Mike Huckabee celebrating her subsequent release. Following a September debate at Bellarmine University, Bevin said, "My intention has always been to execute this race on financial issues, on economic issues. In the last several weeks, 85 percent of what people talk about are these social issues. ... I think the issue has redefined this race whether any of us candidates want that to be the case or not." Associated Press reporter Adam Beam wrote that the Davis case "ignited the passions of religious conservatives in an already conservative state", and University of Kentucky political science professor Stephen Voss opined that a campaign focused on cultural and social issues would be "bad for Conway".

Bevin implied that he opposes state-sponsored marriage in general, saying, "Ultimately, I believe the government should be out of the marriage business altogether. We can comply with the law while protecting our citizens' rights to freedom of religion simply by separating the religious covenant of marriage from the legal, contractual relationship established by marriage as recognized by the state. The two are separate and they should be treated as such. Two consenting adults should not need to ask for permission from the government to enter into a contractual relationship – a license should not be needed. As with other contracts, the government's role should be limited to recording, interpreting, or enforcing such contracts in times of dispute."

===== Reproductive rights =====
After the Center for Medical Progress released series of videos purporting to show Planned Parenthood representatives illegally negotiating the sale of body parts from aborted fetuses, Bevin pledged that, "As governor, I will direct my secretary of the Cabinet for Health and Family Services not to distribute federal taxpayer dollars from that department to Planned Parenthood clinics. Federal taxpayer dollars appropriated to Planned Parenthood flow through the governor's administration. As governor, I will prevent those dollars from being distributed, and order them returned to the federal government." Investigations into the Planned Parenthood controversy debunked that Planned Parenthood employees were illegally selling fetal tissue. In the 2015–16 fiscal year, Kentucky's two Planned Parenthood affiliates—neither of which performs abortions—received $331,300 in federal funding.

==== Personal finances ====
Conway continued McConnell's line of attack on Bevin's finances, specifically the issue of delinquent taxes. While McConnell's charges involved delinquent taxes against Bevin Brothers Manufacturing, Theo Keith of Louisville's WAVE reported in June that Bevin had been late at least 10 times paying property taxes on his vacation homes in Maine and Louisiana between 2002 and 2009. He further reported in July that Bevin's company, Integrity Holdings, also had multiple past delinquency issues. In total, Keith estimated that Bevin had paid about $1,800 in penalties for late tax payments. Bevin became irritated with Keith's reporting and refused to answer questions from him at subsequent press conferences; he did not buy ads on WAVE, despite running ads on Louisville's other three network broadcast stations. The Associated Press' Adam Beam eventually reported that Bevin had paid his taxes late on 30 different occasions. In an October interview with Beam, Bevin said, "Sometimes you do pay it late and you pay interest on having paid it late. But you pay the taxes. ... You do this all the time in business." He added that his critics "could have done just as breathless a story of all the times I paid my taxes early and gotten a discount on it." He also reiterated that, as of the time of the interview, he had paid all of his taxes: "Do I actually owe taxes to anyone, anywhere? The answer is no."

==== Result ====
On August 10, Fark founder Drew Curtis submitted the requisite petition signatures to appear on the gubernatorial ballot as an Independent candidate with his wife, Heather, as his running mate. In early October, the first poll released after Curtis entered the field showed Conway leading with 42 percent support among likely voters, compared to Bevin's 37 percent and Curtis' 7 percent. Fifteen percent of those polled were undecided. Just a week before the election, a Bluegrass poll showed 45 percent support for Conway, 40 percent for Bevin, and 6 percent for Curtis. The Lexington Herald-Leader noted that Bevin had trailed in every publicly released poll, leading political analyst Stephen Voss to conclude, on the eve of the election, that "There's little doubt at this point that, based on the polling methodology these folks use, Conway is ahead." Voss warned, however, that a combination of systematic polling error and late voter decision making could prove the polling wrong.

On November 3, Bevin garnered 511,771 votes (53%) to Conway's 426,944 (44%) and Curtis's 35,629 (3%). Bevin was only the third Republican elected governor of Kentucky since World War II, and running mate Jenean Hampton became the first African-American elected to any statewide office in Kentucky. Conway had counted on strong support from the state's urban areas, but managed smaller-than-expected margins in Jefferson, Fayette, and Franklin counties – home to Louisville, Lexington, and Frankfort, respectively – while turnout on Bevin's behalf was strong in more traditionally Republican rural areas. Conway carried only 14 of Kentucky's 120 counties, and observers wrote that the loss likely ended his political career. Republicans also won the races for treasurer, auditor, and agricultural commissioner. Analyst Ronnie Ellis speculated that the Republicans' victories set the stage for the party to take control of the state House of Representatives in the November 2016 elections. With an eight-seat majority, the Kentucky House was the last legislative body in the South controlled by Democrats.

==== 2019 gubernatorial election ====
On June 1, 2018, McConnell urged Bevin to run for reelection, and on January 25, 2019, Bevin announced that he would run for a second term, choosing State Senator Ralph Alvarado as his running mate over current Lieutenant Governor Jenean Hampton. Bevin was renominated by the Republican Party of Kentucky in a primary election on May 21, 2019, as its candidate for governor in 2019, while Kentucky's outgoing Attorney General Andy Beshear, son of Bevin's predecessor Steve Beshear, won the Democratic nomination.

On election day (November 5), Bevin narrowly lost his re-election campaign to Beshear. Bevin refused to concede, citing what he called "irregularities" and referring to a "process"; court approval would be needed for a full recount, and Kentucky's election recount law does not appear to apply for gubernatorial elections. Bevin claimed, without evidence, that "thousands of absentee ballots that were illegally counted", people were "incorrectly turned away" at the polls, "a number of [voting] machines that didn't work properly", and ballots were stored in open boxes. Fellow Republican lawmakers in Kentucky expressed skepticism of Bevin's claims, and asked him to substantiate the claims or concede.

On November 6, Bevin asked for a recanvass, which involves a review of votes rather than a recount; the recanvass took place on November 14. According to the Kentucky state constitution, a governor must be sworn in on the December 10 following the election. Kentucky's outgoing Secretary of State Alison Lundergan Grimes declared Beshear the winner. Should a candidate contest the election results, the state legislature would determine the winner after hearing a report from a randomly selected 11-member committee from the House (8) and Senate (3). This process, which is enforced through the Goebel Election Law, has only been used once, during the 1899 Kentucky gubernatorial election. However, Kentucky Senate President Robert Stivers and other Republican members of the Kentucky state legislature expressed skepticism of Bevin's voter fraud claim and urged Bevin on November 7 to concede if the recanvass did not go in his favor. On November 11, 2019, Republican U.S. Senator Mitch McConnell announced that "all indications are" Beshear will be the next governor. Bevin conceded the race on November 14, 2019.

=== Tenure ===
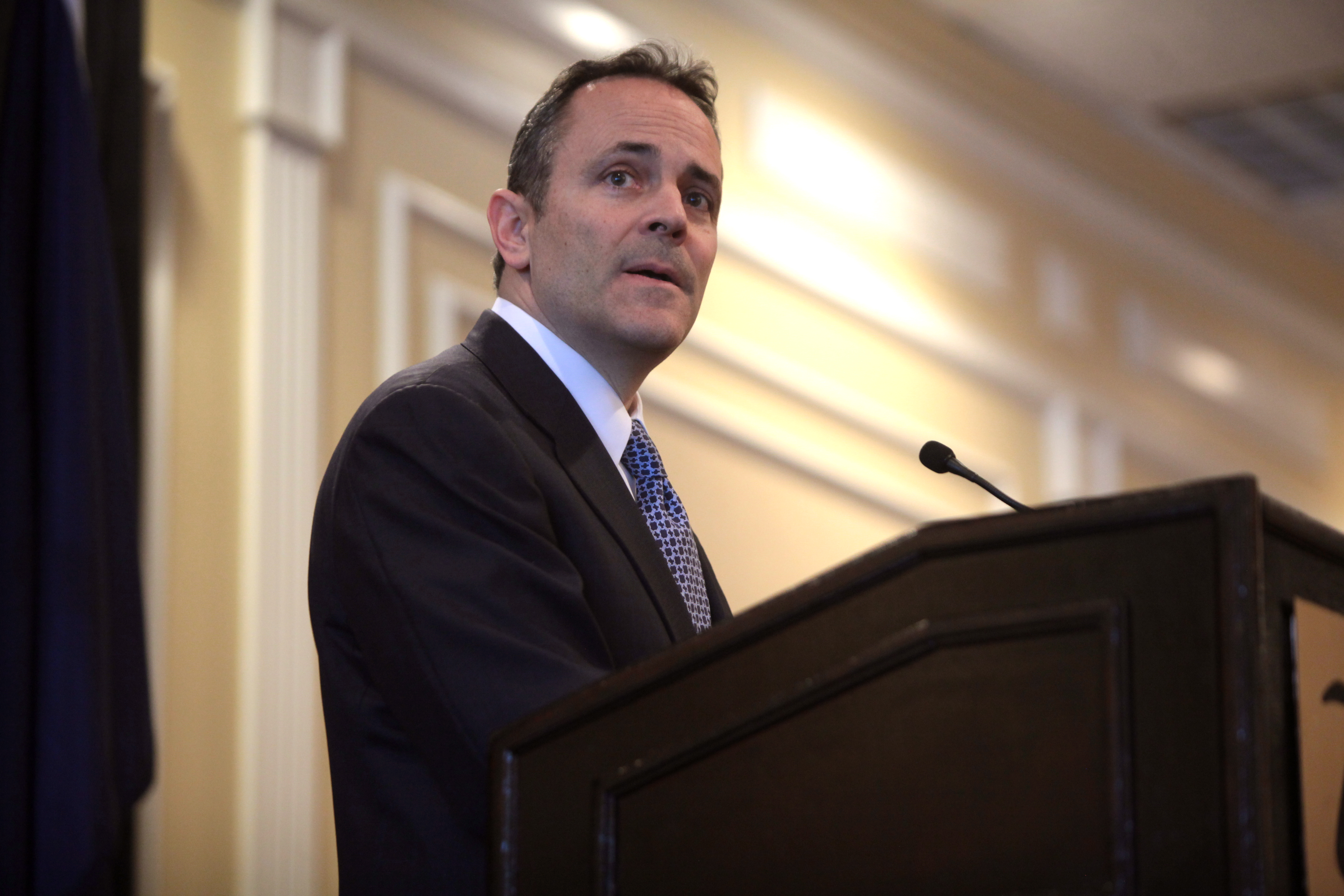
Bevin in 2016 speaking in Nashua, New Hampshire

After a series of terror attacks in Paris – for which the Islamic State of Iraq and the Levant (ISIL) claimed responsibility – Bevin announced that, following his inauguration, he would join 25 other U.S. governors in refusing any Syrian refugees seeking to relocate to their respective states "until we can better determine the full extent of any risks to our citizens." In response, Lexington Herald-Leader political cartoonist Joel Pett published a cartoon depicting Bevin hiding under his desk, his floor strewn with newspapers featuring stories about the Paris attacks, with an aide telling him, "Sir, they're not terrorists.... they're your own adopted kids!", a reference to Bevin's four children adopted from Ethiopia. Bevin responded via Twitter: "The tone of racial intolerance being struck by the @HeraldLeader has no place in Kentucky and won't be tolerated by our administration."

Bevin was sworn into a four-year term as Governor of Kentucky on December 8, 2015. Observers from both parties praised Bevin's selection of experienced, relatively moderate individuals for his cabinet, including his former rival, Hal Heiner, as Secretary of the Education and Workforce Cabinet and former University of Kentucky football standout Derrick Ramsey as his Secretary of Labor. The appointments of two Democratic state representatives – John Tilley as Secretary of the Justice and Public Safety Cabinet and Tanya Pullin to a state judgeship – reduced the party's majority in the House and set up special elections that gave Republicans a chance to win their seats from Democrats. Bevin set the dates of the special elections to fill the seats of Tilley and Pullin, as well as those formerly held by newly elected Auditor Mike Harmon and newly elected Agriculture Commissioner Ryan Quarles, for March 8, 2016. Democratic representatives Denver Butler and Jim Gooch Jr. also switched their party affiliation to Republican in December, reducing the Democratic majority to 50–46 for the beginning of the first General Assembly of Bevin's governorship, and giving Republicans a chance to evenly split the chamber's 100 seats by sweeping the special elections. Republicans held only Harmon's seat, giving Democrats a 53–47 advantage in the House for the remainder of the session.

In a series of December 2015 executive orders, Bevin removed the names of county clerks from state marriage licenses, as well as reversed orders by Beshear that restored voting rights for non-violent felons who had completed their sentences and raised the minimum wage for some state workers to $10.10 per hour.

In December 2015, Bevin announced that the state would not renew an advertising contract for kynect. In January 2016, he notified federal authorities that he plans to dismantle kynect by the end of 2016 and charged Mark Birdwhistell, formerly Secretary of Health under Governor Fletcher, with designing a system to replace kynect. Although the Beshear administration suggested the shutdown would cost the state $23 million, Bevin, citing a Deloitte study, promised it would be in the "small single digits [of millions]".

Bevin declared both 2016 and 2017 the Year of the Bible in Kentucky.

In July 2018, after a federal judge rejected his plan to overhaul the program, Bevin cut Medicaid dental and vision coverage for up to 460,000 Kentuckians. The cuts were only supposed to affect able-bodied adults, but shortly after the cuts were implemented, the state Medicaid computer system showed that some children, disabled adults and pregnant women had lost coverage. Dentists said that they had to turn children away, including some with significant dental decay.

Attorney General Andy Beshear sued Bevin several times over what he argued was the governor's abuse of executive powers, during Beshear's tenure as attorney general and while he was campaigning against Bevin for governor. While he prevailed in a number of cases, Beshear also lost in a number of cases. Bevin said Beshear "never sues on behalf of the people of Kentucky. He does it on behalf of his own political career ..."

Bevin's tenure as governor was contentious. As of May 2016, he had one of the lowest approval ratings among United States governors. His disapproval rating was 51% in late 2018. In January 2019, Morning Consult described Bevin as the "least popular governor up for re-election in 2019" and ranked him number six among the least popular governors in the nation. According to an April 2019 poll, Bevin was the least popular Governor in the United States, with a 52% disapproval rating versus a 33% approval rating. In July 2019, the National Journal placed Bevin second in its list of governor seats most likely to switch parties, and reported "his unpopularity coupled with party infighting make(s) him vulnerable in the deep-red state." In November 2019, Bevin was defeated by Kentucky Attorney General Andy Beshear.

Bevin issued many controversial pardons during his tenure. These included his sister and wife's friend who tried to hire a hitman to kill her ex-husband and his new wife. In his final month of office, Bevin pardoned or commuted the sentences of 428 people, including 336 mostly white drug offenders, but some convicted of crimes such as murder, manslaughter, and rape. Those pardoned included a man whose brother threw a fundraising party to relieve the debt left over from Bevin's defeat and also a man convicted of raping a nine-year-old girl and who had served only one year of a twenty-three-year sentence. Regarding the victim and her sister, Bevin said that "both their hymens were intact," so "there was zero evidence" a rape of the child had occurred. These pardons were met with outrage from some families of the victims, and were scrutinized by some state legislators. On December 13, 2019, President of the Kentucky Senate Robert Stivers–speaking for the Republican majority–condemned the pardons, called on the U.S. Attorneys Office to investigate them for potential violations of the Hobbs Act, and asked Attorney General-elect Daniel Cameron to appoint a special prosecutor to investigate Bevin's actions.

=== 2016 legislative session ===
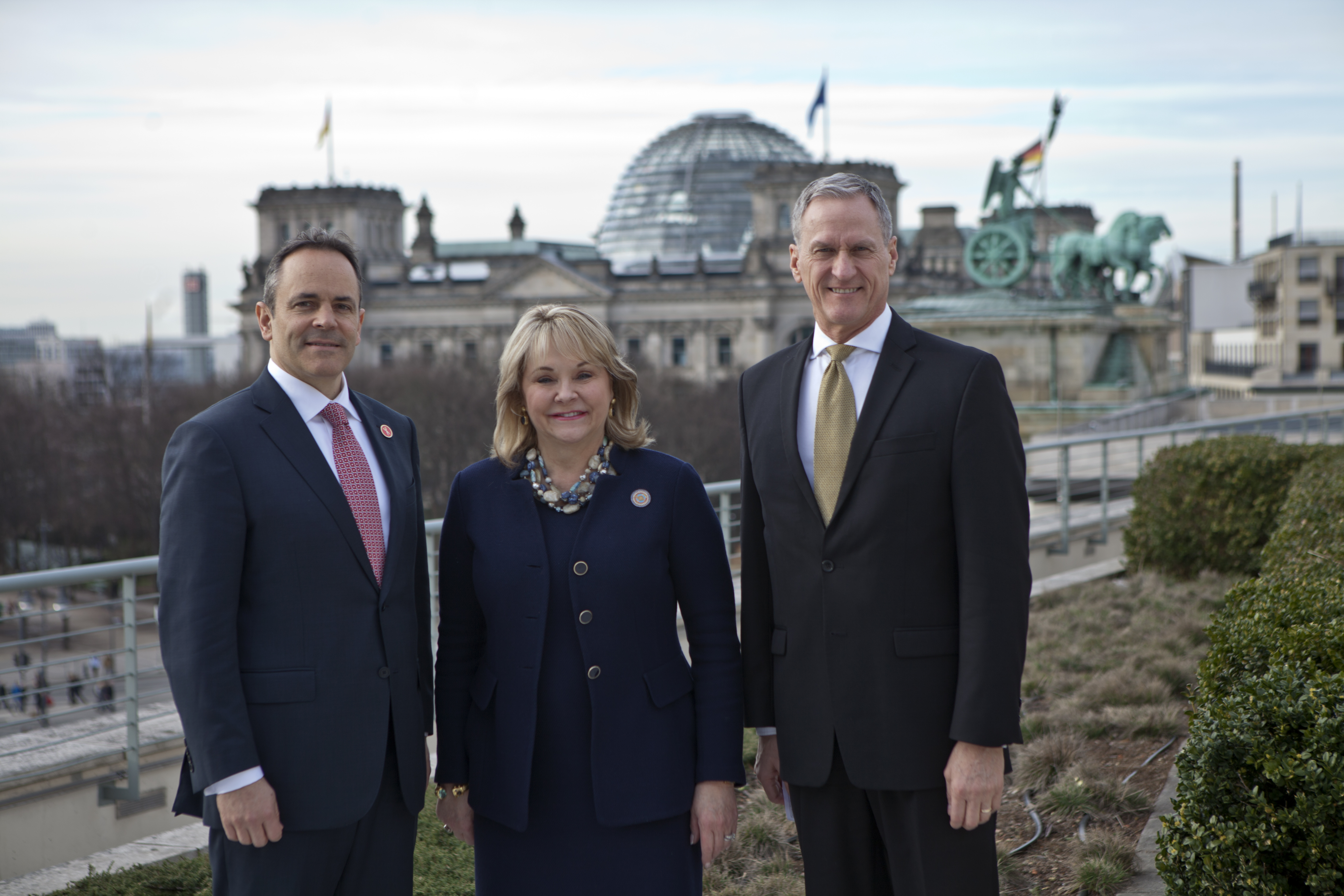
Bevin with Governors Mary Fallin of Oklahoma and Dennis Daugaard of South Dakota in Berlin, Germany, in March 2017

==== Abortion issues ====
In January 2016, Bevin's administration sent a cease and desist letter to Planned Parenthood of Indiana and Kentucky ordering it to stop performing abortions at its clinic in Louisville because it did not have the required license. The clinic claimed it had been given permission to perform the procedures by Beshear's inspector general just prior to Bevin taking office, but nonetheless halted the procedures on January 28. Bevin filed suit against Planned Parenthood in February, claiming it had illegally performed 23 abortions without a license; the suit said Planned Parenthood's licensure application was deficient because it did not include agreements with a hospital and ambulance service to care for patients in case of complications, as required by state law, and that Beshear's inspector general was wrong in instructing the organization to begin performing abortions before the license was approved. Planned Parenthood countered that, before the license could be finalized, the abortion facility would have to be subjected to an unannounced inspection, requiring that abortions were already being performed there. In March, the University of Louisville Hospital announced that it had backed out of a transfer agreement with Planned Parenthood, saying it had been pressured to do so and felt that its state funding was in jeopardy. A spokesman for Bevin denied that the pressure had come from anyone in the administration.

Two weeks after filing suit against Planned Parenthood, Bevin sued EMW Women's Clinic in Lexington, claiming that it was an unlicensed abortion facility. The clinic had been operating without a license under an exemption granted to private physicians' offices, but an inspection of the clinic – the first conducted since 2006 – revealed that the facility performed abortions exclusively. Inspectors also reported "several unsafe and unsanitary conditions" including the presence of expired medications. EMW ceased performing abortions March 9, pending the outcome. On March 18, Fayette County Circuit Judge Ernesto Scorsone declined to issue a cease and desist order to EMW, finding that the first trimester abortions performed there "do not require sedation or the services of an anesthesiologist", suggesting that the clinic was a physician's office. Scorsone also said the clinic served the public interest by providing abortion services for the eastern half of the state. The administration appealed Scorsone's decision, and on June 15, a three-judge panel from the Kentucky Court of Appeals ruled Scorsone's decision in error and issued a temporary injunction against EMW, prohibiting them from performing abortions until and unless the case was eventually resolved in its favor. The Kentucky Supreme Court sustained the injunction in August.

==== Budget issues ====
On January 26, 2016, Bevin delivered a budget address to the General Assembly detailing his two-year budget proposal. The proposal cut the allocation for most state agencies by 9 percent over the upcoming biennium, with most of the savings being redirected into the state pension system, which was among the worst funded in the nation. Public elementary and secondary education were spared from the cuts, as were social workers, public defenders, corrections officers, and Kentucky State Police employees, all of whom received raises under Bevin's proposal. Public colleges and universities were not exempt from the cuts, and Bevin called for a gradual move to performance-based funding for higher education, with all higher education funding tied to performance by 2020.

By executive order, Bevin required all state agencies to reduce spending in their current budgets by 4.5 percent. House Speaker Greg Stumbo argued that Bevin did not have the authority to order such reductions without legislative approval, but Senate President Robert Stivers defended Bevin's action, saying it amounted to simply not spending money that was previously allocated. Bevin later compromised with the state's public college and university presidents to reduce the cuts to 2 percent, but Attorney General Andy Beshear sued to stop the cuts entirely. In May 2016, a Franklin Circuit Court judge ruled Bevin did have the authority to make the cuts. In September 2016, the Kentucky Supreme Court issued a 5–2 decision reversing the Franklin Circuit Court's ruling and agreeing with Beshear that Bevin lacked the authority to make mid-year budget cuts without the approval of the General Assembly.

On March 7, 2016, Bevin released a video on social media claiming that House Democrats were not following through on their obligations to help craft the state budget. Legislators responded with a photo and statements that while Bevin was producing his video, House leaders were in fact in committee meetings working out details of a budget proposal while Speaker Stumbo suggested the Governor was either unfamiliar with the legislative process, or intended to deceive people. On March 12, House Democrats released their own budget, which sustained most of the cuts to executive agencies in Bevin's budget, but exempted public universities from any cuts. The Republican-controlled Senate countered with a proposal that hewed closely to Bevin's original budget.

The two chambers announced that their negotiations had reached an impasse just days before the constitutionally mandated end of the session on April 15, but Bevin insisted he would not call a special session for them to continue negotiations. Just before 3:00 a.m. on April 14, negotiators announced they had reached a compromise that would cut public universities' budgets by 4.5 percent over the biennium instead of the 9 percent requested by Bevin and implement a performance-based funding model in 2017. The money would be reallocated to contribute over $1 billion toward the state pension system's liabilities, which exceeded $30 billion. Republicans agreed to fund a Democratic proposal for a scholarship program providing free community college tuition for qualified students, relented on their demands to stop state funding for Planned Parenthood, and spared the state's prevailing wage guidelines. Bevin signed the budget, but used his line-item veto to strip funding for the scholarship program in the first year of the biennium, saying the guidelines were poorly written and should be revised before implementing the program in 2017. Because of the constitutional prohibition against the legislative session extending past April 15, the General Assembly was unable to override the veto.

=== 2016 Values Voter Summit ===
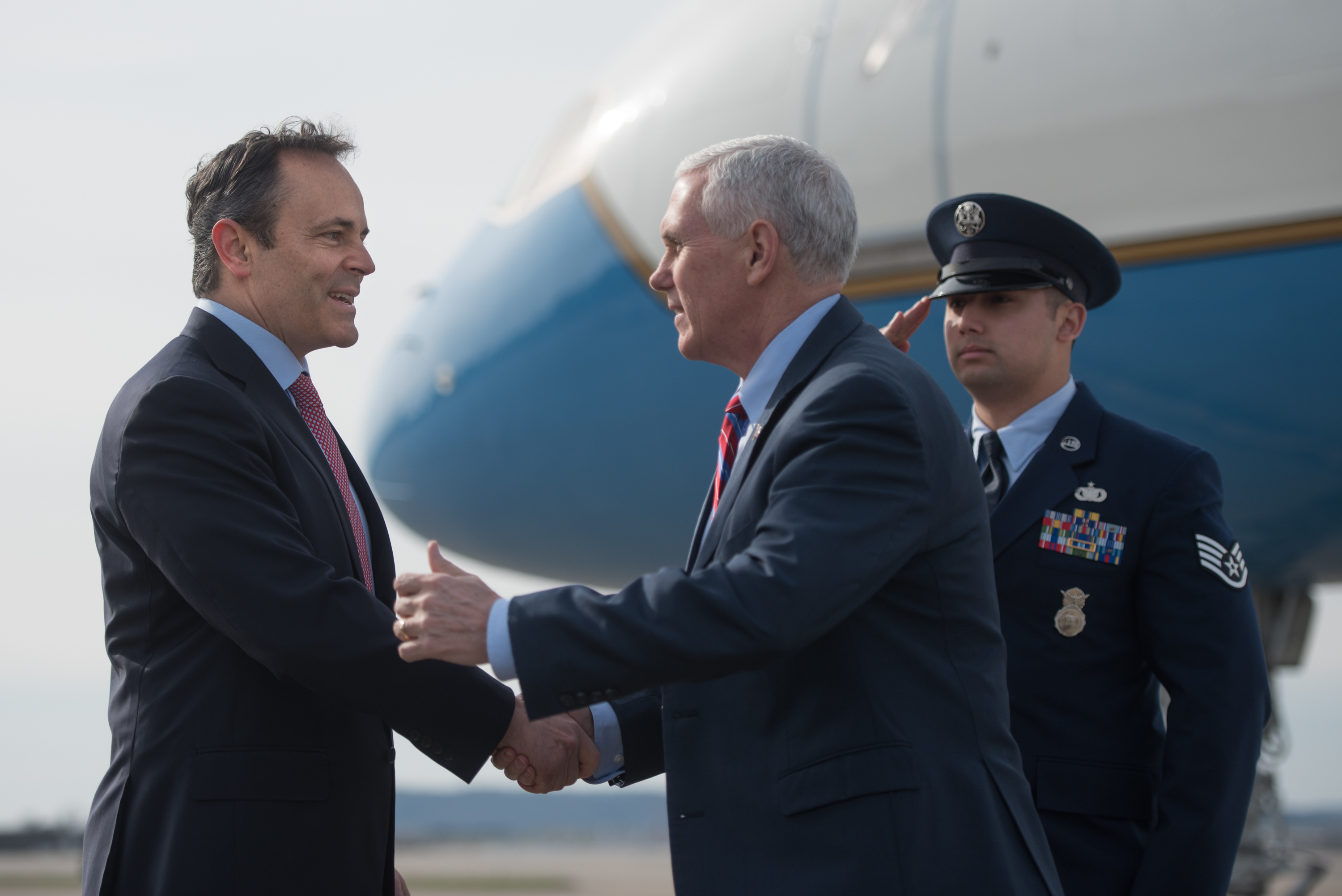
Bevin with Vice President Mike Pence in March 2017

At the September 2016 Family Research Council Action Values Voter Summit (VVS) in Washington, DC, where Republican presidential and vice presidential candidates Donald Trump and Mike Pence also spoke, Bevin "both lamented and called for revolution and bloodshed to 'redeem' what [would] be lost" if Hillary Clinton were to be victorious in the 2016 presidential election, according to one source. He used and echoed language about "the tree of liberty" being refreshed by the blood of patriots and addressed his own family in the same regard – "I have nine children ... it might be their blood [that] is needed." Bevin urged the audience to emulate Winston Churchill rather than Neville Chamberlain, saying, "It's a slippery slope.... First, we're killing [unborn] children [with abortions], then it's 'Don't ask, don't tell,' now it's this gender-bending kind of 'don't be a bigot,' 'don't be unreasonable,' 'don't be unenlightened...'" Another account reported that he "referenced the rise of the Nazis preceding the Holocaust twice, invoking German pastor Martin Niemöller's oft-cited quote that ends, 'then they came for me – and there was no one left to speak for me.'" Another account of the VVS appearance said he had spoken without notes or teleprompter. Later, Bevin asserted that his violent metaphors referred to military sacrifice.

=== 2017 legislative session ===
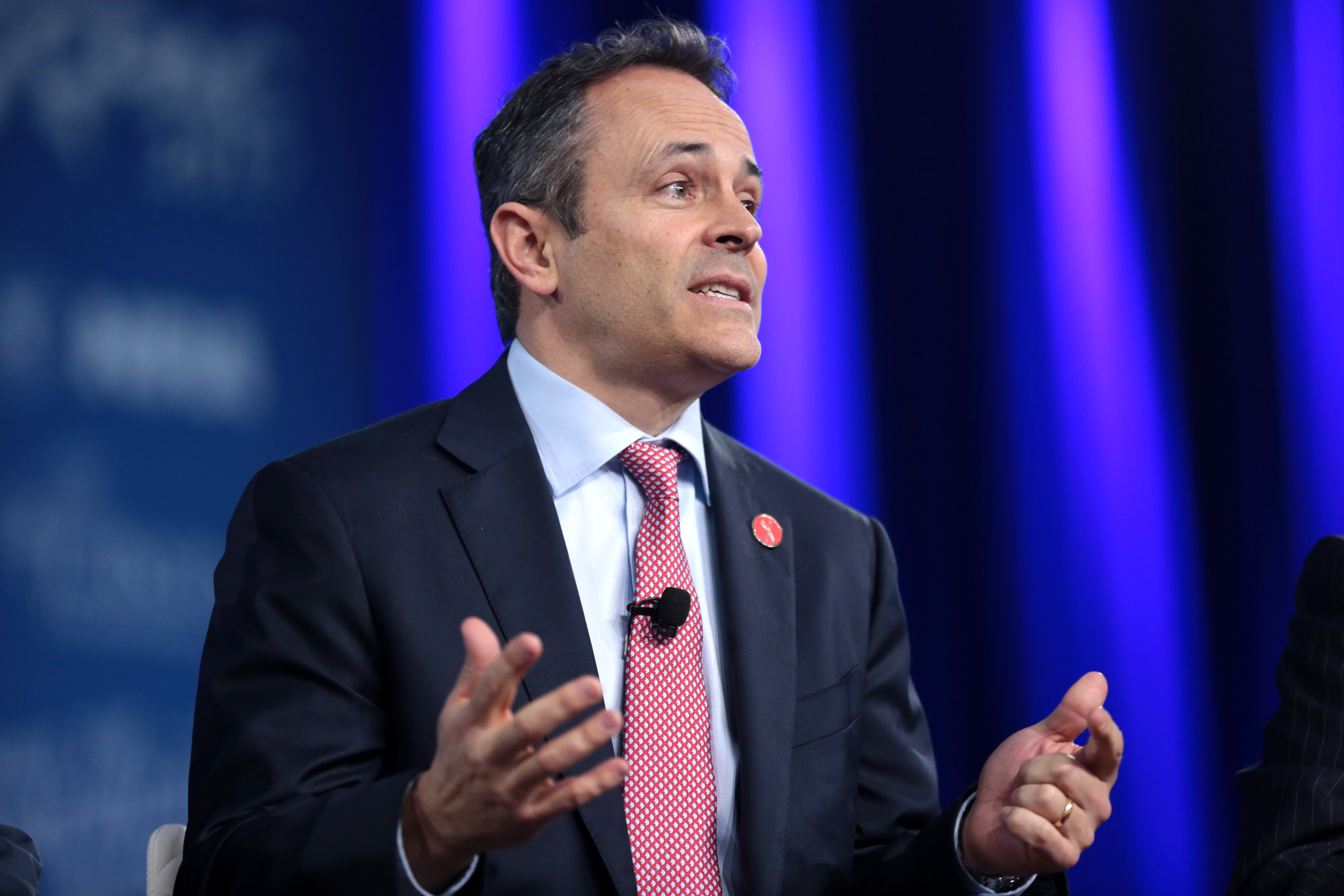
Bevin speaking at the 2017 Conservative Political Action Conference

In the 2016 election, the Republican Party took a supermajority in the Kentucky House of Representatives; the party had not controlled the chamber since 1921. State House Speaker Greg Stumbo, viewed as one of Bevin's main political antagonists, was one of several House Democrats defeated in the election; Bevin remarked, "'good riddance'...he will not be missed one bit. Kentucky will be better for his absence." The 2016 election victories allowed Bevin to pursue his conservative agenda in the ensuing session, as the House Democrats had blocked conservative legislation prior to this.

In an unusual Saturday session in January 2017, the Kentucky General Assembly passed seven fast-tracked bills on key Republican legislative priorities. These bills included two that restricted abortion (one a 20-week abortion ban), and three that reduced the power of labor unions, including a bill making Kentucky the 27th right-to-work state. Bevin signed all seven bills into law on January 9. On January 9, 2017, Bevin signed the two abortion bills.

On March 16, 2017, Bevin signed SB 17 into law, intended to "protect religious expression in public schools" by barring school districts from regulating student organizations in ways such as requiring them to accept LGBT people as members. Other bills Bevin signed into law included a "Blue Lives Matter" bill making it a hate crime to attack a police officer, placing Planned Parenthood at the lowest priority for funding, and removing restrictions on local governments authorizing charter schools. On March 27, 2017, Bevin vetoed a bill that would have allowed a judge to order mentally disabled people to undergo outpatient treatment if they could not recognize their condition and if they had a history of hospitalization, due to his concerns over its effects of individual liberty. The Kentucky legislature overrode his veto on the bill and three others.

In April 2017, Bevin signed HB 128 into law, which ordered the Kentucky Board of Education to develop rules for Bible literacy classes. Bevin signed another bill authorizing Bible classes in June 2017.

In July 2017, Bevin had the Kentucky Capitol building cleaned, choosing to use private funds as payment. During his 2018 Kentucky State of the Commonwealth Address, Bevin said it was the first time the building had been cleaned, echoing a belief expressed in July by an administration cabinet spokesperson.

=== 2018 legislative session ===
In February 2018, following the Stoneman Douglas High School shooting and the Marshall County High School shooting in Kentucky, Bevin declared that it was time to discuss what "should not be allowed in the United States as it relates to the things being put in the hands of our young people". "These are quote-unquote video games ... It's the same as pornography. They have desensitized people to the value of human life, to the dignity of women, to the dignity of human decency." On November 13, 2018, Bevin said that a cultural popularity of death, as evidenced by zombie television shows, is to blame for mass shootings, and that gun regulation is not the solution.

In March 2018, Bevin sparked controversy among local teachers' associations when he criticized their protesting of a pension reform bill as "selfish and shortsighted". In April 2018, he "guaranteed" that the teachers' labor stoppage had resulted in unsupervised children being sexually assaulted, physically harmed, or exposed to drugs. The president of the Jefferson County Teachers Association responded that by Bevin's logic, schools should never have any breaks or vacations. The Republican-controlled Kentucky House condemned Bevin's comments and overrode his veto of a law that increased classroom spending. Days after his controversial comments in April, Bevin said he did not intend to hurt people and apologized.

In November 2018, Bevin signed executive order 2018-905 requiring contractors to certify that they did not boycott Israel. Bevin said that Israeli Prime Minister Benjamin Netanyahu had lobbied for such a policy during the summer.

=== 2019 legislative session ===
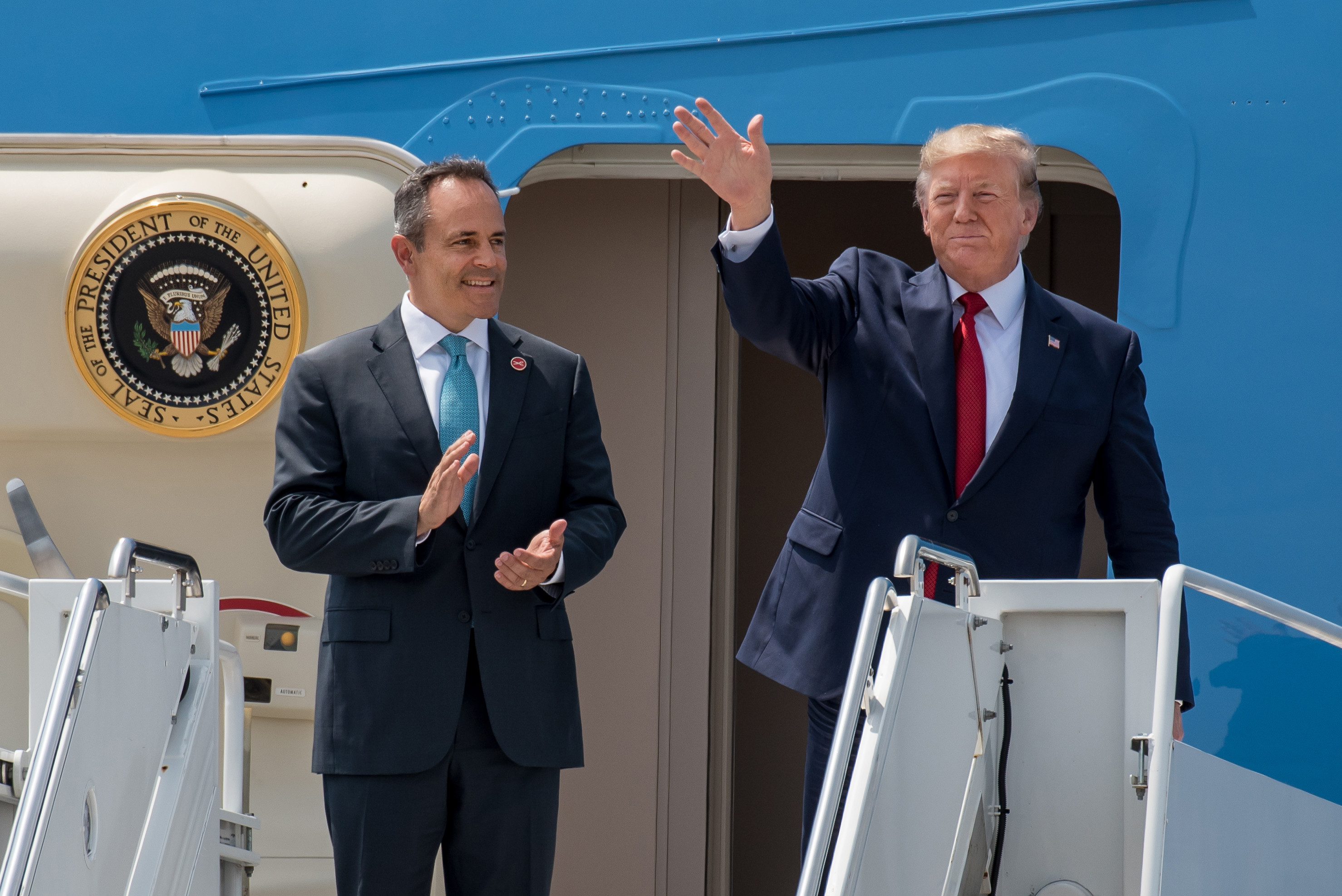
Bevin with President Donald Trump on August 21, 2019

On January 29, 2019, Bevin stated that school closings for January 30 were a "sign America was soft". He received criticism, including from NBC weather forecaster Al Roker, who referred to Bevin as a "nitwit governor". Bevin defended his comments and attacked the Lexington Herald-Leader and Courier Journal, and WKYT as "clowns", referring to a comment by Barack Obama in 2009 about Washington D.C. coming to a halt after a dusting of snow when Chicago would not have canceled school.

On March 11, 2019, Bevin signed a bill into law removing the permit requirement to carry a concealed firearm in the state, becoming the 16th state to enact such legislation. On March 16, 2019, Bevin signed into law a bill banning abortions after the heartbeat is detected, though a federal judge blocked the bill a few hours later. On March 26, 2019, Bevin signed a bill that required public universities to protect free speech rights by banning them from disinviting speakers. On April 25, 2019, Bevin blamed teacher strikes for the death of a seven-year-old. During the 2019 Kentucky Derby, Bevin was booed while making a speech during the trophy presentation, following the disqualification of the original race winner, Maximum Security.

On July 12, 2019, Bevin announced his support for a proposed bill to ban sanctuary cities in Kentucky.

== Personal life ==
While stationed at Fort Polk, Bevin went on a blind date with his future wife, Glenna. At the time, Glenna was a divorced single mother of a 5-year-old daughter from her first marriage to an abusive husband. The two married in 1996 and had five additional children. After Glenna's remarriage, her daughter, Brittiney, took her adoptive father's last name. In 2003, 17-year-old Brittiney was killed in a car accident. In memory of their daughter, the Bevins created Brittiney's Wish, a non-profit organization that funds domestic and international mission trips for high school students, and started an endowment that allowed Louisville's Southern Baptist Theological Seminary to open its Bevin Center for Missions Mobilization in 2012.

In 2011, Bevin took his children out of school for a year for a 26,000-mile (42,000 km) tour of the United States, visiting sites of educational or historical interest, including the Lorraine Motel in Memphis, where Martin Luther King, Jr. was assassinated, and the Topeka, Kansas, schoolhouse at the center of the landmark Brown v. Board of Education Supreme Court decision. After their application to adopt a daughter from Kentucky's foster care system was denied because they already had five children, the Bevins adopted four children between the ages of 2 and 10 from Ethiopia in June 2012. By 2015, Bevin said all of his children were homeschooled. To avoid disruptions in the children's schooling, the Bevins opted not to move into the Kentucky Governor's Mansion immediately after Bevin's election as governor in November 2015, instead waiting until after the school year ended in August 2016. The eleven-member Bevin family was the largest to inhabit the mansion since its construction in 1914.

The Bevins attended Southeast Christian Church in Louisville. After his election as governor, he announced he would hold an invitation-only inaugural worship service at Frankfort's Buck Run Baptist Church, but the service was moved to the Frankfort Convention Center and the invitation requirement was dropped following an "overwhelming response from the public".

In March 2019, Bevin said in an interview that he deliberately exposed all nine of his children to chickenpox so they would "catch the disease and become immune."

In May 2023, Glenna Bevin filed for divorce. The divorce petition stated the marriage was "irretrievably broken" and that the couple had been separated for more than a year. On May 1, 2024, a Jefferson Circuit Judge granted Glenna Bevin's motion to limit Matt Bevin's access to their residence and property after his wife labeled his conduct "aggressive and unsettling." Their divorce was finalized in March 2025.

In late 2019 after losing the governorship, Bevin sent his adopted son Jonah (first identified in the media with the pseudonym "Noah" in 2024) to Atlantis Leadership Academy in Jamaica. The school, an unlicensed "troubled teen" program, was later shut down following an unannounced inspection of the facility on February 8, 2024, by the Child Protection and Family Services Agency (CPFSA) after being alerted by the U.S. Embassy of possible abuse and neglect. The CPFSA and embassy officials found eight American boys aged 14–18 confined in primitive conditions without soap, toothpaste, lavatory paper or even running water in one bathroom. They were removed immediately and transferred by court order the following day into the interim legal custody of the CPFSA. When no Bevin family member or representative claimed Jonah, a judge ordered he be made a ward of the Jamaican State.

In February 2025, Jonah Bevin publicly shared his account of severe abuse and neglect at Atlantis Leadership Academy, including violent beatings, starvation, and forms of torture. After returning to the United States in May 2024 and obtaining a high school diploma, he was left homeless at age 18. On March 7, 2025, a Jefferson County, Kentucky judge issued a temporary protective order against Matt Bevin, restricting him from contacting Jonah Bevin and requiring him to relinquish all firearms in his possession until a March 19, 2025, hearing. In March 2025, a deal was reached wherein the protective order would remain in place against the former governor for six months before the court case would end and an indefinite civil restraining order would begin. Any violations would result in additional hearings. Both adoptive parents are also required to provide Jonah with "any information or documents related to [his biological] family, whether they're alive or not".

In March 2026, a Jefferson County judge sentenced Bevin to 60 days in jail for contempt of court for failing to provide financial information to the court in a case brought by his abandoned son Jonah.

In September 2026, Bevin was arrested by deputies of the Bourbon County Sheriff's Office after he failed to appear in court in May for a hearing regarding child support allegedly owed to his adopted son Jonah. On September 16, 2026, an appellate judge granted an emergency motion ordering the immediate release of Bevin following a complaint filed by Bevin's lawyers arguing that his 60-day sentence was being unlawfully executed.

== Electoral history ==
U.S. Senate Republican primary election in Kentucky, 2014
Party	Candidate	Votes	%
Republican	Mitch McConnell (incumbent)	213,753	60.19
Republican	Matt Bevin	125,787	35.42
Republican	Shawna Sterling	7,214	2.03
Republican	Chris Payne	5,338	1.50
Republican	Brad Copas	3,024	0.85

Kentucky Governor Republican Primary Election, 2015
Party	Candidate	Votes	%
Republican	Matt Bevin	70,480	32.90
Republican	James Comer	70,397	32.87
Republican	Hal Heiner	57,951	27.06
Republican	Will T. Scott	15,365	7.17

Kentucky gubernatorial election, 2015
Party	Candidate	Votes	%	±%
Republican	Matt Bevin	511,374	52.52%	+17.23%
Democratic	Jack Conway	426,620	43.82%	−11.90%
Independent	Drew Curtis	35,597	3.66%	N/A
Total votes		973,692	100.0%	N/A
Republican gain from Democratic				

Kentucky Governor Republican Primary Election, 2019
Party	Candidate	Votes	%
Republican	Matt Bevin (incumbent)	136,060	52.4%
Republican	Robert Goforth	101,343	39.0%
Republican	Ike Lawrence	14,030	5.7%
Republican	Will Scott	8,412	3.2%

Kentucky gubernatorial election, 2019
Party	Candidate	Votes	%	±%
Democratic	Andy Beshear	709,577	49.20%	+5.38%
Republican	Matt Bevin (incumbent)	704,388	48.83%	−3.72%
Libertarian	John Hicks	28,425	1.97%	N/A
Total votes		1,442,390	100.0%	N/A
Democratic gain from Republican				

Party political offices
Preceded by David Williams	Republican nominee for Governor of Kentucky; 2015, 2019	Succeeded by Daniel Cameron
Political offices
Preceded by Steve Beshear	Governor of Kentucky; 2015–2019	Succeeded by Andy Beshear
U.S. order of precedence (ceremonial)
Preceded by Steve Beshear as Former Governor	Order of precedence of the United States; Within Kentucky	Succeeded by Jack Markell as Former Governor
Preceded by Steve Beshear as Former Governor	Order of precedence of the United States; Outside Kentucky	Succeeded by Phil Bredesen as Former Governor
