= Panty Raiders =

The Panty Raiders – Leba Haber Rubinoff and Katie Marsh – are two women who created a website purporting to sell "Forget-me-not Panties" in 2005. The website was created as an entry into the New York-based Contagious Media Showdown's contest to see which purpose-built website could spark the most viral interest over a three-week period. Haber Rubinoff and Marsh saw the contest and website as a venue to raise awareness and discussion about gender. They were not expected to win, but their work was picked up by Fark, the College Humor blog and other sites, leading to more than 600,000 sites during the contest period and one million hits in the six months between May and November 2005.

Surprising both the creators and the contest organizers, many visitors to the website believed the product to be real and attempted to order the panties or learn how to become a distributor. The creators believe the website's success, which was a significant return on a $18 investment, came from the humor and the fact that it was picked up by key bloggers who helped to spread the word. This resulted in the duo winning the $2,500 grand prize.

Other websites created by the duo include: Plastic Assets, which advertised a new credit card that offered free breast implants to young applicants; Christians Against Hip Hop, which tried to save white girls from the "dangers" of hip hop; and Adopt Black Girls, a fake adoption agency for young girls, which raised awareness about the effects of racist policy after Hurricane Katrina.
