= DesignCrowd =

Online crowdsourcing platform

DesignCrowd Pty Ltd
- Type: Proprietary Limited
- Industry: Graphic design, CrowdsourcingWeb design
- Founded: Sydney, Australia (2007)
- Founder: Alec Lynch (CEO)
- Headquarters: Sydney, Australia
- Key people: Garry Visontay; Anthony James Glenning; Craig Blair
- Website: www.designcrowd.com

DesignCrowd is an online crowdsourcing platform founded in 2007 in Sydney, Australia. Its main product is online software called BrandCrowd which enables users to create design assets, such as logos and websites.

== History ==
DesignCrowd was launched in January 2008 by Alec Lynch.

The company has received funding from Starfish Ventures. On 20 December 2011, DesignCrowd acquired Brandstack, a stock logo template marketplace for buying and selling logo templates and graphic designs. Following the acquisition, Brandstack's name was changed to "BrandCrowd." In 2014, DesignCrowd announced that it had acquired community design contest website Worth1000 for an undisclosed amount. The company expanded to Philippines in 2014. In 2015, AirTree Ventures invested $6 million in DesignCrowd.
