= Bevin Brothers Manufacturing Company =

Bell foundry in Connecticut, United States

Bevin Brothers
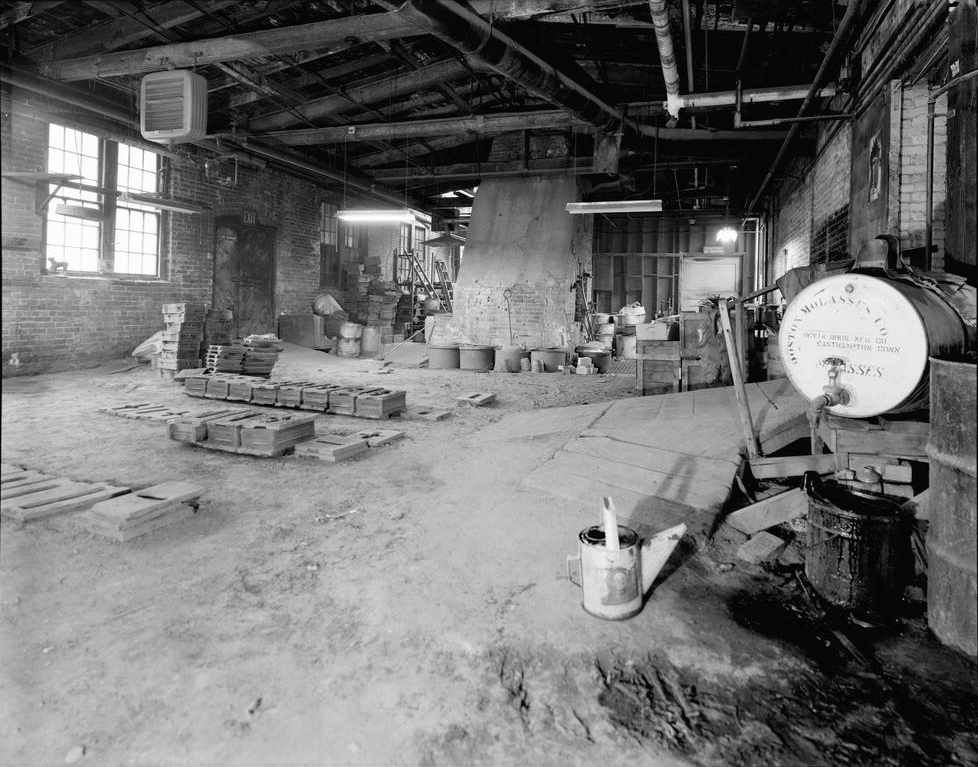
- Photo of Bevin Brothers from the Historic American Engineering Record
- Type: Private
- Industry: Bell Manufacturing
- Founded: East Hampton, Connecticut, USA (1832)
- Headquarters: East Hampton, Connecticut, USA
- Key people: Matt Bevin, President; Douglas Dilla, General Manager
- Revenue: $2.5 million (2016)
- Number of employees: 20
- Website: www.bevinbells.com

Bevin Brothers Manufacturing company (also called Bevin Brothers) is a family-owned bell foundry located in East Hampton, Connecticut.

== History ==
The company was found by brothers, William Bevin, Chauncey Bevin, and Abner Bevin in 1832. They were later joined by a fourth brother, Philo Bevin.

The business's website states it produced the first foot gong used in an automobile (the bell was patented in 1897). The foot gong is a bell that was beneath the floor of early automobiles and was rung by pressing it with your foot. It has since been replaced by the car horn.

Through the years more than 30 companies have made bells in East Hampton earning it the nickname of "Bell Town." Bevin Brothers is the only remaining bell manufacturer in East Hampton and still remains in the Bevin family.

Through the years it has made sleigh bells, house bells, cow bells, sheep bells, door bells, and ship's bells.

It has been the main manufacturer of bells for the Salvation Army's Christmas-time bell-ringers.

On May 27, 2012, the factory was struck by lightning resulting in a devastating fire that razed the Bevin Brothers mill. In the wake of the fire, Bevin Brothers' future as a bellmaker was uncertain. At the time of the fire, the factory was reported to be the last company in the United States to solely produce bells, which it still claimed to be, as of 2019. In 2012(?), it had 19 employees, and was reported to make 1.2 million bells in 200 varieties.

By 2017 the firm was "fully restored", ensconced in another factory building "a short walk" from the former, with 20 employees, and previous year's sales of about $2.5 million. Though all equipment had been in the 6-story building that burned, many dies were recovered from the ruins.

As of 2019, it reportedly made 50 types of bells. As of 2023, its website continues to assert existence and it making 50 types of bells.

== Notable bells ==
- All of the Salvation Army Christmas bells
- The bell used to indicate the start and finish of the New York Stock Exchange trading
- Boxing championship bells
- A bell aboard the U.S.S. Maine
- The bell used to signify an angel got its wings in the 1946 film It's a Wonderful Life
- The cowbell played by Will Ferrell in the Saturday Night Live sketch "More Cowbell"

== See also ==
- Matt Bevin
