= Worth1000 =

Image manipulation website (2002–2013)

Aviary, Inc.
- Type: Company
- Industry: Web Based
- Founded: January 2002
- Founder: Avi Muchnick
- Defunct: October 2013
- Headquarters: New York City, New York, United States
- Key people: Avi Muchnick, Israel Derdik
- Products: Plime; Aviary; DesignCrowd; Worth1000
- Parent: Adobe Systems
- Website: www.worth1000.com (defunct)

Worth1000 was an image manipulation and contest website.

Worth1000 opened on January 1, 2002, and hosted over 340,000 unique images made in theme contests such as "Rejected Transformers", "Invisible World", and "Stupid Protests". In mid-2003, Worth1000 began hosting similar competitions for photography, creative writing, and multimedia. The service was shut down on 1 October 2013. In June 2014 the site was acquired by Sydney based crowdsourcing site DesignCrowd from Emerge Media.

The website was designed by Avi Muchnick and Israel Derdik. Muchnick named it after the old saying "a picture is worth a thousand words".

Worth1000 and its members have created three books on image manipulation: When Pancakes Go Bad, I've Got a Human in My Throat, and More Than One Way to Skin a Cat.

== Contests ==
Competition mostly took place in a series of themed contests. A subject title was given along with a sample photo manipulation from a previous or similar contest and a brief description of what contestants should try to do. Entries were then accepted for a fixed period of time, after which they were posted so people could vote on them, and the results were then compiled. Examples of contests were:

- Reality manga - Alter photos of real people (celebrities are popular) so that they look like Japanese anime drawings come to life.
- Chimaera – Create a new animal by mating three or four other animals to one.
- Invisible world - Take any object or person in an image and make it invisible using photoshop. No indication or outline of the object/animal/person should be seen, except through its function/interaction with other objects and/or people in the image. Some images, are based in the 1897 H. G. Wells science-fiction novella, The Invisible Man.
- If Goths ruled – Show what the world would look like if Goths ruled it.

Others include mating animals with instruments or plants, zombifying or aging celebrities, combining several movies to one, and many others.

Photoshop contests were the main attraction of Worth1000, but it also had a variety of contests for photography, writing, illustration, and a multimedia. Along with the regular contests, members of Worth1000 could challenge each other in head-to-head competitions as well.

== Forums ==
The Worth1000 site had a large community as well as a selection of forums. The forums were a place for general discussions and humor, and questions and answers regarding techniques for the various types of contests. Due to the many active admins and a word-filter that monitored the forums, a high level of troll control existed.

== Intramural competitors ==
Similar sites have competed in an intramural tournament with Worth1000.com, including:

- Something Awful's Photoshop Phriday
- Fark

== Shutdown and later history ==
On August 12, 2013, Worth1000's founder, Avi Muchnick, announced in the community forums that Worth1000 would be closed and converted into a static museum. The final contest was scheduled to end on the midnight changeover (Worth time) of September 29/30.

Worth1000 was scheduled to close at midnight on 30 September 2013, but problems with the transfer of the site to the Static Museum status meant that it stayed open for a further 24 hours. However, once that period had passed users were greeted with a single page with the message that the site was now closed and would resurface within the next few days as a museum. However, after a brief hiatus, Muchnick announced via a cryptic 1 Corinthians 15:4 message and an image from Worth's archives of the Turin Shroud. Posted to Worth's 'refugee' website communities on Google+ and Reddit, former users found that the site had been sold to Emerge Media and would re-open soon.

Worth1000 returned to the version of the site that existed in the week before the shutdown, one week after the instigation of the museum. Over the following months, the new team transferred the site to new servers. However, ongoing technical issues and with declining popularity and an alienated user base, the new owners announced the intention to rebrand, redesign and invigorate the site. Contests were hosted to create logos for the new site, and admin level users were invited into discussions on the redesign.

In June 2014, graphic design crowdsourcing company DesignCrowd announced that it had acquired Worth1000 for an undisclosed amount. DesignCrowd announced its intent to port all user accounts and artistic content to DesignCrowd servers, while attempting to keep the user experience unchanged. The company announced the acquisition would help "create a bigger and better marketplace for freelance designers". The transfer, however, was repeatedly delayed and by the end of 2015 had not been completed. Member frustration was exacerbated by the decision that Worth1000 members not wishing to become DesignCrowd members, would have to “opt out” of the migration, rather than “opt in".

Worth1000 was no longer available online on February 26, 2016.
