= 2018 Kentucky Senate Bill 151 =

Senate Bill 151 (SB 151)
- Passed: March 29, 2018

Legislative history
- Bill title: Senate Bill 151
- Bill citation: http://www.lrc.ky.gov/record/18rs/SB151.htm
- Introduced by: Kentucky Senate
- First reading: March 12, 2018
- Second reading: March 13, 2018
- Third reading: March 16, 2018
- Status: Struck down

Senate Bill 151, also known as SB 151, is a pension bill passed on March 29, 2018, by the Kentucky Senate and the Kentucky House of Representatives. The bill includes increases for cost of living, ends the inviolable contract for new teachers hired after January 1, 2019, and requires employees hired between 2003 and 2008 to pay an additional 1 percent of their pay for health care benefits in retirement. The bill received considerable criticism, especially from teachers. On December 13, 2018, the Kentucky Supreme Court ruled that the bill was unconstitutional, preventing it from going into effect on January 1, 2019.

== Legislative history ==
Senate Bill 151 was introduced in the Senate on February 15, 2018. On March 29, 2018, it was passed by the Kentucky Senate by a vote of 22–15 and the Kentucky House with a vote of 49–46. The bill was sent to Kentucky Governor Matt Bevin’s desk. It was received by Kentucky Secretary of State Alison Lundergan Grimes, and signed by Bevin on April 10, 2018. On December 13, 2018, the Kentucky Supreme Court struck down SB 151 as unconstitutional, resulting in the bill never taking effect.

=== House vote ===
Map of the vote Republican yea (49) Republican nay (11) Republican not voting (3) Democratic nay (35) Democratic not voting (2)

The bill was initially passed by the house by a 49–46 vote. Representatives Mary Lou Marzian and Stan Lee, who did not vote, later modified their votes to nay. Lynn Bechler, who also did not vote, later modified his vote to yea, bringing the total to 50–48.

House of Representatives vote
Party	Votes for	Votes against	Not voting
Democratic (37)	–	35	2
Republican (63)	49	11: John Blanton; Larry D. Brown; Regina Bunch; Tim Couch; Robert Goforth; Kim King; Phil Moffett; C. Wesley Morgan; Steve Riley; Jim Stewart; Jill York	3
Total (100)	49	46	5

=== Senate vote ===
Map of the vote Republican yea (22) Republican nay (5) Democratic nay (10) Democratic not voting (1)

The bill was approved by the senate by a 22–15 vote. Senator Perry B. Clark, who did not vote, later modified his vote to nay.

Senate vote
Party	Votes for	Votes against	Not voting
Democratic (11)	–	10	1
Republican (27)	22	5: Julie Raque Adams; Tom Buford; C. B. Embry; Alice Forgy Kerr; Brandon Smith	–
Total (38)	22	15	1

== Opposition to SB 151 ==
The decision to pass Senate Bill 151 on March 29, 2018, sparked outrage from teachers across Kentucky. As a result, schools in 25 counties closed on March 30, 2018. Teachers rallied in Frankfort to protest the bill and chanted phrases such as "120 strong" and "united we stand, divided we fall." On June 20, 2018, Franklin Circuit Judge Phillip Shepherd ruled the bill as unconstitutional and stated that the legislature violated Section 46 of the Constitution by failing to give the bill three readings on three separate days in each chamber.

=== Lawsuit filed by Andy Beshear ===
After SB 151 was passed, Kentucky Attorney General Andy Beshear announced his intentions to file a lawsuit to stop the bill. On April 11, 2018, Beshear, the Kentucky Education Association and the Kentucky State Lodge Fraternal Order of Police filed a lawsuit against Bevin and other lawmakers following the decision to sign the bill. Bevin responded by filing a motion to dismiss Beshear from the lawsuit for conflicts of interest. On April 25, 2018, Bevin's request to disqualify Beshear was denied by the Franklin Circuit Court.

Bevin called for Phillip Shepherd to step down, as well as referring to him as a "hack", but the judge refused to step down. Bevin's request to dismiss Shepherd was denied by the Kentucky Supreme Court on June 6. On June 13, Bevin filed an amended petition, but was denied on July 11. On August 10, 2018, the Kentucky Supreme Court announced that September 20, 2018 would be the date for hearing the case. On September 20, the case was taken to court. On December 13, 2018, the Supreme Court ruled against SB 151 on grounds that the bill did not receive the required three days of public readings, as mandated by the Kentucky Constitution. This ruling handed Beshear a victory over Bevin.

== Reactions to Supreme Court decision ==
After the Kentucky Supreme Court ruled SB 151 unconstitutional, the decision received praise from the Kentucky Public Pension Coalition and the Kentucky Democratic Party, and criticism by the Kentucky Republican Party. Justice Daniel J. Venters wrote that the bill did not comply with the requirements established in the constitution. Teachers celebrated the decision and called it a "win for democracy". However, Matt Bevin criticized the decision as "unprecedented power grab by activist judges".

== See also ==
- Education in Kentucky
