= BrandCrowd =

Brandstack
- Industry: Online Marketplace
- Predecessor: Incspring
- Founded: March 2008; 18 years ago
- Founder: Wes Wilson
- Defunct: 11 December 2011
- Fate: Acquired by DesignCrowd
- Key people: Alec Lynch, CEO
- Website: www.brandcrowd.com

Brandstack is an online website for creating logo, business cards, social media posts, videos and other graphic designs.

== History ==
Brandstack was founded in March 2008 and had its beginnings under the name Incspring. Founded by CEO Wes Wilson and based out of San Antonio, Texas, Incspring's branding solution began to gain recognition in the tech blogging community. In June 2009, Incspring changed its name and branding to Brandstack, with a logo acquired within its service. Brandstack has since been trademarked as Brandstack, LLC.

Brandstack temporarily closed in late 2011, prior to being acquired by DesignCrowd.

On 20 December 2011, DesignCrowd, an online crowdsourcing marketplace, announced the acquisition of Brandstack. Following the acquisition, DesignCrowd changed Brandstack's name and branding and launched BrandCrowd. In 2018, BrandCrowd launched its logo maker. The firm is headquartered in Sydney, Australia.

== Products ==
Brandstack launched a sister site, Upstack.com, in February 2010 for custom design work to augment Brandstack.com's marketplace for logos. Included services on Upstack.com are logos, websites, print collateral, illustrations, and basic web graphics. Upstack's custom design service has been replaced by DesignCrowd an Australian-based online crowdsourcing company.
