= It's Not News, It's FARK =

2007 book by Drew Curtis

It's Not News, It's Fark: How Mass Media Tries to Pass Off Crap as News
- Author: Drew Curtis
- Language: English
- Subject: Mass Media
- Genre: Non-fiction
- Publisher: Gotham Books
- Publication date: May 2007
- Publication place: United States
- Pages: 278 pp
- ISBN: 978-1-59240-366-0
- OCLC: 226975395

It's Not News, It's Fark: How Mass Media Tries to Pass Off Crap as News is a book by Fark founder Drew Curtis. It is a critical look at the mass media industry.

== Overview ==
The book is divided into eight sections, each dealing with a different pattern exhibited by the media industry. Within each section are several specific news stories exemplifying that pattern. At the end of each example, Curtis also lists humorous comments from the original Fark discussion thread which covered the news story. The topics are:

- Media Fearmongering contains news stories used to scare the audience. Examples are terrorists attacking, the San Andreas Fault, and the Avian Flu.
- Unpaid Placement Masquerading as Actual Article is about news stories which, whether intentionally or not, advertise a product or organization. An example is an article indicating that 90 percent of the ocean's large fish are extinct—an unconfirmed statistic written by an author promoting a book about damage to the environment.
- Headline Contradicted by Actual Article are news stories which have misleading or contradictory headlines that are the opposite of what is implied by the article. An example is an article run by the Detroit Free Press titled "Asian Vehicles Rank Low in Survey" which later contained the statistic that 29 of the 31 cars that earned a top reliability rating were Japanese.
- Equal Time for Nutjobs is about articles published just to give an opposite side to a story, even if that opposite side has been proven false. Examples include 9/11 Truthers.
- The Out-of-Context Celebrity Comment relates to articles which give a disproportionate amount of attention to a comment made by a celebrity, like Brad Pitt's position on stem cell research or the Dixie Chicks' position on the Iraq War.
- Seasonal Articles focuses on recurring articles published the same time every year. An example is AAA reports related to increases in traffic during the Christmas holidays.
- Media Fatigue refers to stories examined and exhausted past their relevance. Examples would include the September 11 attacks and the Janet Jackson Super Bowl XXXVIII halftime show controversy.
- Lesser Media Space Fillers are non-categorical articles which consistently reappear. Examples include the coverage of missing white women and hurricanes.

== Reviews and press ==
The book peaked at #12 on Amazon.com's non-fiction bestseller list. It was reviewed positively by Stephen King, Dave Barry, and Chez Pazienza—a former CNN producer. Despite its success, Slate.com reviewer Jack Shafer noted that it received "scant attention" from the mainstream press, noting that the Tucson Citizen was the largest American newspaper to review it. Shafer suggested that perhaps the book was overlooked because it appeared to fall in the "humor" category, and because "It suffers from more than 100 pages of padding, and it’s derivative of material available on Fark.com". However, the book was more widely recognized in broadcasting, with profiles in NPR, for instance, and on G4TV.
