= Photo editing =

Photo editing can refer to:

- Image editing, techniques applied to photographs
- Photo manipulation, the use of image editing to create an illusion or deception

== See also ==
- Image processing
