= Drew Curtis =

American Internet businessman (born 1973)

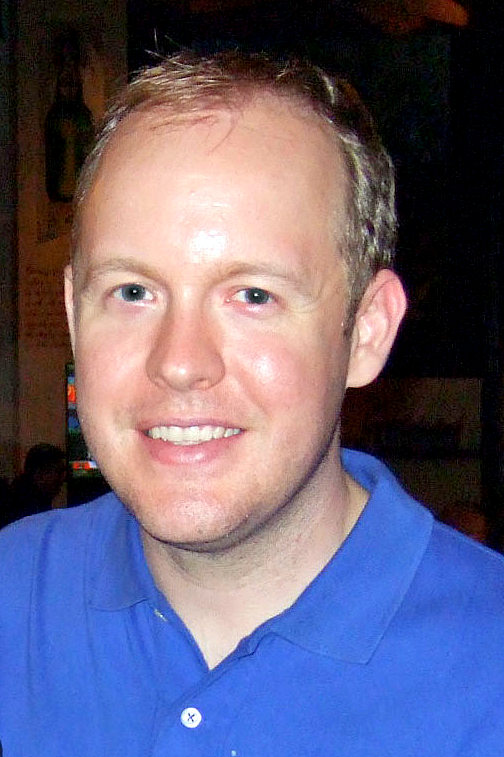
- Born: February 7, 1973 (age 53); Lexington, Kentucky, U.S.
- Education: Luther College
- Occupations: Publisher and writer
- Years active: 1993–present
- Known for: Founder of Fark
- Partner: Heather Curtis
- Children: 3

Drew Curtis (born February 7, 1973) is the founder and an administrator of Fark, an Internet news aggregator. He is also the author of It's Not News, It's FARK: How Mass Media Tries to Pass Off Crap as News in May 2007. He is a guest on WOCM's morning show The Rude Awakening Show every Tuesday. Curtis was the Independent gubernatorial candidate for Governor of Kentucky in 2015 but lost to the Republican nominee Matt Bevin.

== Fark ==
Fark began in 1993 when Curtis was in England, sending links back to his friends. Curtis registered Fark.com in 1997 but did not begin posting links on the site until 1999. The first story on Fark was a news article about a fighter pilot who crashed while attempting to expose his buttocks to another fighter pilot. Since then, the site has become one of the most popular link dump sites on the internet with nearly 50 million pageviews a month. As of 2006, the site was getting over 2,000 link submissions every day. It was the first indie blog to earn one million dollars a year in profit and its classifieds section alone generates as much as $40,000 per year.

Although Fark is a million-dollar business, Curtis takes a yearly salary of $60,000. The rest of the money goes to the site's legal 'war chest' and to pay other expenses.

Under Curtis, Fark has purposely shied away from the Web 2.0 mantra of total user control.

I don't care what anyone says, the masses are morons. You can't count on them to pick good stuff. Just check out Network TV to see what the masses want for entertainment. It all sucks. Don't even get me started on how they vote for elected officials. There's certainly a place for that kind of thing but it's not on Fark.

According to Curtis, Web 3.0 will be "something called Good Editing." Speaking at a media conference in Washington, DC hosted by the Poynter Institute, Curtis stated, "The 'wisdom of the crowds' is the most ridiculous statement I've heard in my life. Crowds are dumb. It takes people to move crowds in the right direction, crowds by themselves just stand around and mutter."

In 2006, Curtis was featured on the cover of Business 2.0 magazine as the feature in a story about successful websites. Lexington Weekly named him one of their businessmen under 40 to watch.

On November 28, 2007, Curtis filed an application to trademark the phrase "not safe for work" a common phrase on Fark. His application was denied.

== It's Not News, It's FARK ==
Curtis published his first book, It's Not News, It's FARK: How Mass Media Tries to Pass Off Crap as News in May 2007. It soon became a bestseller. An in-depth analysis of the state of modern media, It's Not News, It's Fark slams news organizations for running smaller versions of his not-real-news. In his review of the book, Farhad Manjoo of Salon.com said that "[Curtis] even seems to go after the audience – his audience – for indulging in [not-real-news] Curtis seems to want us to be repulsed by them instead."

Curtis's book peaked at #12 on Amazon.com's non-fiction bestseller list. Media critic Jack Shafer noted that despite the book's success, it received "scant attention" from mainstream media outlets. The book was later released in paperback.

== Personal life ==
Curtis graduated from Luther College in Decorah, Iowa in 1995. From 1996 to 2002, he owned and operated DCR.NET, an ISP based in Frankfort, Kentucky. He is a graduate of the Berkeley-Columbia Executive MBA program, a joint venture of New York's Columbia University and the University of California at Berkeley. Curtis lives in the suburbs of Lexington, Kentucky with his wife, Heather, and children, Chance, Storm, and Sierra.

== Gubernatorial campaign ==
Curtis announced his candidacy on January 23, 2015, for the 2015 election for the Governor of the Commonwealth of Kentucky. The platform revolved around a "Citizen Candidate" philosophy of common sense and data-driven decisions, no experiments, leaving people alone, having no party alignment, and taking special-interest money out of the political process. The stated hope was to build a blueprint for regular, real people in all 50 states/commonwealths to be able to create constructive disruptions in a broken system, in order to run competitively in elections. With his wife Heather as his running mate, Curtis faced the Republican Party nominee, businessman Matt Bevin, and the Democratic Party nominee, Kentucky Attorney General Jack Conway, in the November 3 general election. In the election held on November 3, 2015, Curtis lost the election to Bevin, receiving 35,629 total votes, or 3.7%.

== State Auditor campaign ==
In January 2019, Curtis filed to run as a Democrat for the post of State Auditor for Kentucky. Faced with a primary against three other Democrats, he withdrew on April 11, 2019, citing "other commitments". Due to his late withdrawal, Curtis' name remained on the primary ballot, but votes in his favor were not counted. The primary was subsequently won by Democratic candidate Sheri Donahue, who lost by a 14.62% margin in the general election to incumbent Republican Mike Harmon.
