= Aviary (image editor) =

Former photo-editing platform

- Aviary running on Android Lollipop
- Developer(s): Aviary, Inc.
- Initial release: 2007
- Final release: 2018
- Operating system: Android, Windows, and iOS
- Type: Image editing software
- License: Freemium
- Website: aviary.com (defunct)

Aviary was a photo-editing platform for iOS, Android, Windows, and the web (web application). Aviary powered numerous mobile applications, including its self-titled iOS and Android apps, and a Windows app called Photo Editor. It contained a large collection of easy-to-use editing tools such as custom photo filters, frames, graphics, and overlays. The Aviary platform also had a free SDK that provided developers with a customizable photo editor that could be embedded into apps on iOS, Android, Windows, OS X, and the web. The company was founded by Avi Muchnick, Israel Derdik and Michael Galpert in 2007 with the goal of providing professional-quality photo-editing tools to the general public. In 2009 and 2012, Aviary received millions of dollars in funding from investors such as Spark Capital and Jeff Bezos.

On September 22, 2014, Aviary was acquired by Adobe Systems. Later, on November 13, 2014, Aviary integrated the suite into Adobe's Creative Cloud. In December 2018, Adobe announced that they would remove Aviary from download stores and end support for the product.
