= Avi Muchnick =

- Born: 1979 (age 46–47)
- Citizenship: American
- Education: Queens College
- Occupation: Entrepreneur
- Years active: 2002–Present
- Known for: Worth1000; Aviary
- Website: www.avimuchnick.com

Avi Muchnick (born 1979) is an artist, author, programmer and entrepreneur. Muchnick attended Queens College, where he served as Editor-in-Chief of the campus newspaper.

In 2002, while attending Benjamin N. Cardozo School of Law, Muchnick co-founded the popular creative contest site Worth1000, together with Israel Derdik.

In 2007, he co-founded Aviary, a company that built an award-winning multimedia application suite of creative web apps, with Israel Derdik and Michael Galpert. In September 2011, citing stalling growth of the multimedia application suite, he shifted Aviary's business strategy to powering the photo-editing in third-party apps on web and mobile smart phones. Seeing enormous immediate growth, he chose to focus the company exclusively around this new direction and closed down Aviary's consumer-facing multimedia application suite, one year later on September 15, 2012. As of March 2013, Aviary announced passing 35 million monthly active users, 3,500 partners and 3 billion photos edited across its partner network. On September 22, 2014, Aviary was acquired by Adobe Systems.

Muchnick was named one of the Top 35 Innovators Under 35 by MIT's Technology Review magazine in 2010.
