= Fark =

Website launched in 1999

- The Fark homepage on June 1, 2011
- Website type: News Aggregator
- Available in: English
- Founded: September 1997; 29 years ago
- Owner: Drew Curtis
- Website: www.fark.com
- Commercial: Yes
- Registration: Required to post (free)
- Launched: 1999; 27 years ago
- Current status: active

Fark is a community website created by Drew Curtis that allows members to comment on a daily batch of news articles and other items from various websites. The site receives many story submissions per day and approximately 100 of them are publicly displayed on the site, spread out over the main page as well as topical tabs that are organized as entertainment, sports, geek, politics and business). Curtis says the stories are selected without intentional political bias, but that he tries to run both far-left and far-right articles.

Links are submitted by Fark members (collectively referred to as "Farkers"), whom admins can approve ("greenlight") to post on either the main page or one of the subsidiary tab pages. Other than sponsored content, links have associated threads where users can comment. Greenlit links can generate upwards of 300,000 page views in one month for the recipient. This can generate such an enormous amount of traffic in such a short time that smaller websites thus linked are often rendered inoperable due to congestion or simple server failure. This is colloquially referred to as the website being "farked" by the community.

== History ==
Fark was created in 1999 by Drew Curtis of Lexington, Kentucky. Curtis states that the word "fark" originated either from a chat room euphemism for the word fuck, or from a drunken misspelling, although he tells people it is the former because it is a "better story that way". He registered Fark.com in September 1997, when a friend mentioned that all of the four letter domain names were disappearing. Originally, Fark contained no content except for an image of a squirrel with large testicles. This photograph is that of a Cape Ground Squirrel in Etosha National Park, Namibia, taken by photographer Kevin Shafer, who at the time worked for the Corbis Corporation, c. 1993. The squirrel image is no longer used in the production area of the site, but it can still be found as the server's 404 error for pages that do not exist.

Since 1993, Curtis had frequently read morning news stories and exchanged them with friends. Although this would later become the inspiration for Fark, Curtis toyed with the idea of starting an online curry recipe database. In 1999, eighteen months after registering the domain name, he launched Fark as a way to share interesting news postings with his friends rather than sending them numerous emails. The first story posted was an article about a fighter pilot who crashed while attempting to moon another fighter pilot.

During Fark's first year, the site received over 50,000 page views and one million the year after. Features such as link submission and forums were added as popularity and participation grew. By January 2008, according to Curtis, the site was averaging an estimated 52 million page views per month from 4 million unique visitors. Fark was officially incorporated in the state of Delaware, as Fark, Inc., on January 31, 2008.

While most of the story links on the main page are submitted by users and selected for placement based on merit, there was an incident in August 2004 in which Fark was accused of selling preferential placement of story links on the main page. The accusation stemmed from an exchange between Mahalo.com CEO Jason Calacanis and third party sales employee Gogi Gupta, where Gupta claimed Calacanis could buy an editorial on Fark for $300 to $400. Curtis dismissed the incident as the result of an overenthusiastic salesperson, and subsequently fired Gupta. Gupta worked for a company called Gupta Media and did not have the authority to speak for Fark, according to Curtis.

Curtis launched Foobies.com in 2006 as a NSFW (not safe for work) offshoot of Fark, primarily because advertisers complained about links to female breasts on the main site. Customers could purchase NSFW links through Foobies at the price of $400 per link.

Fark launched Fark TV on January 17, 2007. The first video was a spoof ad for a mock product called "Meth Coffee." In May 2008, Turner Broadcasting announced that it would be folding SuperDeluxe, Fark TV's host site, into the Adult Swim brand, and laying off most of the staff, effectively canceling Fark TV.

Screenshot depicting the design of the website from 2007 to 2011

A new design for the website was launched on April 25, 2007, with the comment, "Fark site redesign is now live. Hope nothing breaks, we're all out drinking." The new design was initially received with some controversy by many users, mostly due to the change in layout and a seemingly indifferent attitude by site moderators to user impact or feedback. In response, Drew Curtis noted the following reasons for the redesign: "Websites have to evolve over time. Otherwise you end up with a layout anachronism like the Drudge Report. The old design was put into place years ago, over time changes were nailed on to the design like loose shingles on a leaky roof. It was time to reformat and remove a bunch of the clutter while trying to keep the core design intact."

Curtis published the book, It's Not News, It's Fark: How Mass Media Tries to Pass off Crap as News in May 2007. The book critically explores the mass media industry and the go-to stories used when there is a lack of hard news to report. It sold 25,000 copies in its first 12 weeks on the market.

On November 24, 2009, Fark launched a new partnership with USA Today, as they became the exclusive host and sponsor of Fark's Geek Page, a collection of technology-related links. This represents the site's first content partnership with a major media brand. Previously, Curtis had signed a sales only deal with Maxim Online. The page shows aggregated technology news headlines from other news sources with USA Today's Tech section branding. Its right column displays technology content from USA Today with video clips and a headline widget of USAToday.com's Tech Live and Game Hunters stories.

In January 2011, Fark was sued in Los Angeles Federal Court by Gooseberry Natural Resources, LLC, for allegedly violating US Patent No. 6,370,535, titled, "System and method for structured news release generation and distribution." This patent, awarded in 2002, involves typing text into an administration system, storing it on a server, and publishing it on the Internet. Other defendants sued in the case include Reddit, The Atlanta Journal-Constitution, Digg, Geeknet (owner of Slashdot), TechCrunch, Newsvine, and Yahoo!. Drew Curtis argued that Fark does not produce "news releases" or "press releases", as the lawsuit stated, and instead provides a forum for humorous links to stories on other websites. The case was settled in August 2011, for the sum of $0. Curtis later described the entire ordeal as, "a nightmare", saying, "Imagine someone breaking into your home, then being forced to sit on the couch while their lawyers file motions over how much stuff they can take." At the 2012 TED Conference in Long Beach, California, he referred to patent trolls as "terrorists", comparing them to the Abu Sayyaf terror group in the Philippines, which kidnapped people for ransom, collected small sums of money, expanded with more personnel and equipment, and then kidnapped more people for higher ransoms.

Screenshot depicting the design of the Fark iPhone app (2012)

Fark tweaked its site design a little more on June 1, 2011, with the comment, "Fark's redesign will go live at 5PM EST. Heads-up for those of you who missed the other warning threads and need a place to completely lose your mind." Having learned from the controversy caused by the 2007 redesign, Curtis introduced the new site as a preview one week (two weeks for TotalFark users) prior to June 1, to allow users to comment on the changes and provide feedback on where things were broken. The primary reason for the redesigned site is to make it easier to use and more intuitive. The site's tagline was changed from "It's not news, it's FARK" to "We don't make news. We mock it." The music tab was also dropped, due to low usage – content was rolled into the Showbiz or Video tab, where most of the content was already cross-posted anyway. An overhaul to the Fark Mobile Web site was not done at this time, but Curtis did say that small changes would be implemented over time to make the mobile site more consistent with the overall design of the new site.

An official iPhone app, "HEY! on Fark", was released on June 11, 2012, for the iPhone, iPad, and iPod Touch. The app enables users to receive notifications on various stories appearing on Fark by topic or keyword, as well as allows users to comment on stories. It also lets users set a "snooze" option, or a period of time when notifications will not be sent (e.g. for sleeping or work). An app for Android phones is also planned. Other iOS apps are also available allowing users to browse the site, including, "Mobile Reader for FARK®" and, "Fark® Not News", although these are not official apps.

== Administration ==
Compared to other popular websites, such as Daily Kos and del.icio.us, Fark is a relatively small operation, run more or less singlehandedly by founder Drew Curtis from his home near Lexington, Kentucky. The site earns revenue from advertising and membership in its TotalFark program. Although Curtis won't release official revenue figures, he estimated that, in 2006, the site earned just under $600,000 per year. Its classifieds section alone generates as much as $40,000 per year. Technology writer Mathew Ingram described Fark as "staggeringly successful" and noted the disparity between Fark's revenue and the amount of press given to sites like Digg. Fark has also spoken about its steady, above average CPMs.

Drew takes a yearly salary of just $60,000. The rest of the money goes to the site's legal "war chest" as well as to pay other expenses such as hosting, website design, and forum moderation.

Curtis has used public relations to drive traffic, including interviews every Friday on TechTV for one to one and a half years (c. 2002–2003) about the three weirdest tech-oriented stories of the week.

== Features ==
=== Tags ===
Submitters can give stories several different tags, such as stupid, interesting, obvious, or dumbass. Tags that say photoshop, audioedit or videoedit are used for threads where digital content is edited for a humorous or artistic effect. In addition, the newsflash tag is used for news which is a matter of important breaking news, and an email is sent to the administrators notifying them that someone has submitted a newsflash.

Due to the large amount of headlines submitted to the site from the state of Florida, and because "so many stupid things happen in Florida, it deserved its own Fark tag," the Florida tag was created at the suggestion of users. Similarly, articles discussing Wil Wheaton – a Fark user himself – are given the Wheaton tag and articles discussing Christopher Walken are occasionally given the Walken tag, though Walken has never participated on Fark.

On August 19, 2008, a new fail tag was introduced, to be used for submitted articles where the subject does something ignorant or when a major gaffe occurs. A new Caturday tag was introduced to in recognition of the caturday meme on December 21, 2009.

=== TotalFark ===
In February 2002, Curtis introduced TotalFark as a subscription service, charging $5 per month (As of Sep 2020, the Totalfark monthly prices seems to now be $10). By May 2007, there were an estimated 2,000 subscribers, generating $120,000 per year. Subscribers, known collectively as TotalFarkers or TFers, at one time had the privilege of seeing and commenting on all links submitted to the site, as opposed to only those approved for inclusion on the main page. However, as of 2010, an estimated 40% of links submitted to TotalFark are deleted within one minute of being submitted. In a typical 24-hour period, TotalFark's main page includes 1,200 to 1,800 links with associated comment threads, whereas Fark's main page includes only 60 to 80 links from that total.

Subscribers who purchase a 6- or 12-month subscription are also eligible to receive an @ultrafark.com email address. The UltraFark email service is provided through Google's Gmail service.

=== Farkisms and clichés ===
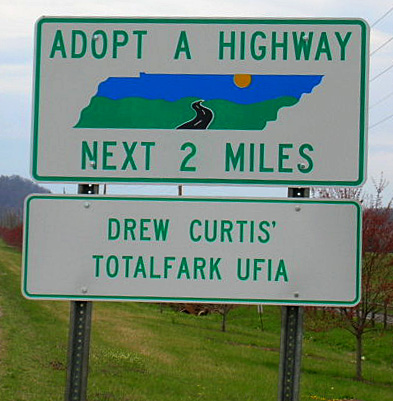
"TotalFARK UFIA" Adopt a Highway sign

Fark's comment threads are often littered with various Farkisms or clichés. These are essentially in-jokes which either originated on Fark or on other sites (such as 4chan or Something Awful) that have become an integral part of the community culture and used in myriad discussions in the forums, regardless of whether they apply to the topic at hand. Several groups of people seem to take a bit more abuse than others on the site, including PETA, Catholic priests, the French, and Duke University, according to Curtis. The site has also become somewhat well known for including "NSFW" (Not Safe For Work) in the headlines of links that contain images or videos of a sensitive nature, and in 2007, attempted to file a trademark of the phrase. Fark was also involved in organizing the Rickrolling of the New York Mets in April 2008, when they encouraged readers to vote for Rick Astley's Never Gonna Give You Up as the song to be played during every home game of the 2008 season.

One particularly notable Farkism involves the acronym UFIA (Unsolicited Finger In Anus), which became a cliché after an article making the main page misquoted a judge using the line. UFIA was prominently used again in February 2005, when Drew Curtis purchased the naming rights to the Fleet Center (now TD Garden) in Boston, Massachusetts for the single day of February 28, 2005. The consensus choice of Fark's readers was that it should be re-dubbed the "Fark.com UFIA Center". In the end, however, Boston Garden was chosen as the name due to obscenity concerns. In April 2006, a Fark member convinced the Tennessee Department of Transportation to erect an Adopt a Highway sign in the name of UFIA on the two miles of State Route 63 west of the intersection of SR 63 and U.S. Route 25E. The department required a definition of UFIA, which was explained as, "Uniting Friends in America." The sign remained up for a few days, but was ultimately removed once authorities were informed of the origins of the acronym.

Another popular Farkism involves KABC-TV Consumer Specialist Ric Romero, which began on October 19, 2005, when he wrote a news story on the "new" Internet phenomenon of blogging. The story was then picked up by Fark, where he was ridiculed for posting a story about something that many people did not consider "news" and was actually quite obvious. Over the course of the next several years, he became somewhat of a meme on the site, as Farkers would post links to his stories, along with his photo, and a brief caption stating something obvious that everyone already knew. On December 7, 2009, Drew Curtis discovered his Facebook fan page, which led Romero to ask the Farkers that joined his new Facebook page to donate to the Spark of Love Toy Drive, which subsequently resulted in 582 online donations totaling $13,659.20 by December 16, 2009. Romero thanked the Fark community on the news for their donations, and recognized his status as a Farkism, also reporting the "breaking news" that "Water is Wet."

=== Photoshop contests ===
The site features regular Photoshop contests, in which users use a graphical editing program (such as Adobe Photoshop, from which the contest draws its name) to manipulate an image provided by the creator of the contest. A similar site, Something Awful, sponsors Photoshop Phriday contests. The image is usually manipulated for humorous effect, but can also be edited to create an aesthetically pleasing image or to showcase a poster's image manipulation skill, which is then voted on by others in the forum.

=== Fark Parties ===
At periodic intervals throughout the year, Fark Parties are organized, usually in conjunction with the travels of Curtis. The practice began in 1999, when Curtis was doing some database consulting in Spartanburg, South Carolina. Staying in a hotel with nothing to do, he posted a note on the site asking anybody who lived in the area to email him if they wanted to join him for a beer.

== Traffic and users ==
As of June 2009, the site received approximately three to four million unique visitors per month, and garnered 60 million page views and 75 million outbound links. This put it in the top 100 of English language websites. Fark's Alexa rating was 2,310, with the average user spending 5.8 minutes per day on the site and 5,337 sites linking in. 67.2% of users originate from the United States. The site receives approximately 2,000 story submissions per day from users, and approximately 50 of them are displayed on the main page of the site, or "green-lighted". Subscribers to the subscription TotalFark service, are able to view all 2,000 submissions per day for a $5 per month fee. There are around 500,000 user accounts on the site (including both TotalFark as well as unpaid accounts), although only about 5% actually read comments, and only 1% actually post in the forums. Greenlit links can generate upwards of 300,000 page views in one month for the recipient, which is such an enormous amount of traffic that smaller websites are often "farked", meaning that their servers have crashed.

Normally, in the absence of serious news, comments in the forums on the site tend to be of a more sophomoric nature. However, during major events such as the September 11 attacks or the Hurricane Katrina aftermath, usage spikes and the site can actually be seen as a more serious outlet for news. Some users can also contribute greatly to reporting actual events; for instance, the citizen journalism of the events during the 2009 Iranian election protests was recognized by several major media outlets. In response to this coverage, Drew Curtis placed a green band on the letter "K" in the site's logo at the top of the page, to show support for Mir-Hossein Mousavi.

In a June 2009 interview, Curtis said that almost all traffic coming from the People's Republic of China and India was from spammers, so he blocked both countries from the site.

== Publicity ==
As the site's popularity grew, Fark appeared many times in popular media outlets. In 2006, Curtis and Fark were featured on the cover of Business 2.0 magazine as part of the feature story about successful websites. In 2007 and 2009, Fark was referenced on the game show Jeopardy!, with a category entitled "Fark.com Headlines." The site is also frequently used as a humorous source for news by many radio stations, as well as late night comedy shows. However, much to Drew Curtis' dismay, it is very rarely cited as a source for many of these stories.

Several celebrities have also stated that they either checked the website regularly or participated in its discussion forums using an account. Some of these celebrities include Alan Colmes of Fox News, MythBusters co-host Adam Savage, science fiction author John Scalzi, and actor Wil Wheaton.

== See also ==
- Cracked.com
- Something Awful
- Worth1000
