= 2027 Kentucky gubernatorial election =

- November 2, 2027
Party	Democratic	Republican
Incumbent Governor
Andy Beshear
Democratic

The 2027 Kentucky gubernatorial election will be held on November 2, 2027, to elect the governor of Kentucky. The winner will succeed Democratic incumbent Andy Beshear, who is term limited and ineligible to seek a third consecutive term. Primary elections will be held on May 18, 2027.

This is the only Democratic-held governorship up for election in the 2027 cycle.

== Democratic primary ==
=== Candidates ===
==== Declared ====
- Rocky Adkins, former senior advisor to the governor (2019–2026) and candidate for governor in 2019
- Jacqueline Coleman, lieutenant governor of Kentucky (2019–present)

==== Declined ====
- Adam Edelen, former Kentucky auditor of public accounts (2012–2016) and candidate for governor in 2019
- Attica Scott, former state representative from the 41st district (2017–2023)

=== Endorsements ===
Rocky Adkins

Statewide officials

- Jim Gray, former Kentucky secretary of transportation (2019–2026)

Labor unions

- Teamsters Local 783
Jacqueline Coleman

State legislators

- Gary Clemons, SD-37 (2026–present)
- Rachel Roarx, HD-38 (2023–present)
- Cherlynn Stevenson, former HD-88 (2019–2025)
- Reggie Thomas, SD-13 (2014–present)

Labor unions

- Teamsters Local 89

Individuals

- Hadley Duvall, abortion rights activist

=== Polling ===
Poll source	Date(s) administered	Sample size (Note: Key: A – all adults RV – registered voters LV – likely voters V – unclear)	Margin of error	Rocky Adkins	Jacqueline Coleman	Undecided
Public Policy Polling (D) (Note: Poll sponsored by the Democratic Lieutenant Governors Association, which supports Coleman)	May 12–13, 2026	650 (LV)	—	14%	40%	45%

== Republican primary ==
=== Candidates ===
==== Declared ====
- Brett St. Amand, veteran
- James Comer, U.S. representative from KY-01 (2016–present) and candidate for governor in 2015
- Rick Hardin, commonwealth's attorney for Kentucky's 46th judicial circuit (2018–present)
- Charles "Bruiser" Martin, distiller and reality television contestant

==== Publicly expressed interest ====
- Savannah Maddox, state representative from the 61st district (2019–present) and candidate for governor in 2023
- Thomas Massie, U.S. representative from KY-04 (2012–present)
- Damon Thayer, Kentucky Senate majority leader (2013–2025) from the 17th district (2003–2025)

==== Potential ====
- Daniel Cameron, former Kentucky attorney general (2019–2024) and 2023 gubernatorial nominee
- Nate Morris, businessman and candidate for U.S. Senate in 2026

==== Declined ====
- Michael Adams, Kentucky secretary of state (2020–present) (endorsed Comer)
- Stan Cave, former chief of staff to Governor Ernie Fletcher (2004–2007) and former state representative from the 45th district (1993–2001)
- Russell Coleman, attorney general of Kentucky (2024–present) (running for re-election)
- KC Crosbie, co-chair of the Republican National Committee (2025–present)
- Scott Jennings, political strategist
- Robert Stivers, president of the Kentucky Senate (2013–present) from the 25th district (1997–present)

=== Endorsements ===
James Comer

U.S. senators

- Andy Barr, Kentucky-elect (2026–present)
- Rand Paul, Kentucky (2011–present)

U.S. representatives

- Brett Guthrie, KY-02 (2009–present)

Statewide officials

- Michael Adams, Kentucky secretary of state (2020–present)
- Russell Coleman, attorney general of Kentucky (2024–present)
- Jonathan Shell, Kentucky commissioner of agriculture (2024–present)

=== Polling ===
Hypothetical polling

Poll source	Date(s) administered	Sample size	Margin of error	James Comer	Michael Adams	Undecided
Axis Research (R)	April 19–21, 2026	407 (LV)	± 4.9%	46%	14%	38%

== Independent candidates ==
=== Candidates ===
==== Declared ====
- Jonathan Hay, music producer and activist

== Notes ==
Partisan and media clients
