= Girdler =

Girdler is a surname of professional origin.

Girdlers or belt makers are people who make metal belts worn around the waist and other small metal objects. The occupation was of particular importance in the past, but still exists today.

The surname may refer to:

== People with the surname Girdler ==
- Chris Girdler, American politician from Kentucky
- Eddie Girdler, American politician from Kentucky
- Nick Girdler, British radio broadcaster
- Ryan Girdler (born 1972), Australian rugby player
- William Girdler (1947–1978), American filmmaker

== People with the given name Girdler ==
- George Girdler Smith, American engraver in 19th-century Boston

== Other uses ==
- Girdler, Kentucky
- Girdler Island

== See also ==
- Girdler sulfide process, industrial production method for making heavy water (deuterium oxide)
- Worshipful Company of Girdlers, a Livery Company of the City of London
