= Jagged Island =

Jagged Island may refer to:

- Jagged Island (Graham Land)
- Jagged Island (South Shetland Islands)
