= Girdler Island =

Island in Graham Land, Antarctica

- Location within Antarctica

Geography
- Location: Antarctica
- Coordinates: 66°0′S 65°39′W

Administration
- Administered under the Antarctic Treaty System

Demographics
- Population: Uninhabited

Girdler Island is a small island at the south side of Mutton Cove, lying 0.2 kilometres (0.1 nmi) southwest of Cliff Island and 15 kilometres (8 nmi) west of Prospect Point, off the west coast of Graham Land, Antarctica. It was charted and named by the British Graham Land Expedition, 1934–37, under John Rymill.

== See also ==
- List of Antarctic and sub-Antarctic islands
