= Upper Island =

Island in Graham Land, Antarctica

Upper Island (66°0′S 65°39′W) is a narrow island at the north side of Mutton Cove, lying between Cliff and Harp Islands and 13 kilometres (7.0 nmi) west of Prospect Point, off the west coast of Graham Land in Antarctica. It was charted and named by the British Graham Land Expedition (BGLE), 1934–37, under John Rymill.

== See also ==
- List of Antarctic and sub-Antarctic islands
