= Mutton Cove =

Mutton Cove may refer to:

- Mutton Cove, Biscoe Islands, Antarctica
- Mutton Cove, Portland, Dorset, England
- Mutton Cove Conservation Reserve, South Australia
