= Cliff Island, Antarctica =

Island off the coast of Graham Land, Antarctica

Cliff Island (66°0′S 65°39′W) is a narrow cliffed island at the south side of Mutton Cove, lying immediately south of Upper Island and 8 nautical miles (15 km) west of Prospect Point, off the west coast of Graham Land, Antarctica. It was charted and named by the British Graham Land Expedition under John Rymill, 1934–1937.

== See also ==
- List of Antarctic and sub-Antarctic islands
