= Hadley Duvall =

American reproductive freedom advocate

- Born: March 28, 2002 (age 24); Henderson, Kentucky, U.S.
- Education: Midway University
- Known for: Reproductive freedom advocacy

Hadley Duvall (born March 28, 2002) is an American activist who advocates for reproductive freedom and abortion rights.

== Early life and education ==
Duvall was born in Henderson, Kentucky, and grew up in Owensboro. Her stepfather impregnated her when she was 12 after several years of rape and abuse. She miscarried and kept the pregnancy secret for a decade until the 2022 Dobbs v. Jackson Supreme Court decision overturning Roe v. Wade, which prompted her to post about her experience on Facebook.

In 2024, Duvall graduated from Midway University with a degree in psychology with a focus on alcohol and drug counseling.

== Activism ==
Duvall was featured in an ad for Andy Beshear's 2023 gubernatorial reelection campaign that went viral and was widely credited by Republican leaders for helping Beshear win.

Duvall also spoke of her experience onstage at the 2024 Democratic National Convention. In her speech, she cited Donald Trump's remarks calling abortion bans "a beautiful thing" and asked, "What is so beautiful about a child having to carry her parent's child?" Duvall later appeared in an ad for Kamala Harris's presidential campaign.

In the 2027 Kentucky gubernatorial election, Duvall endorsed Jacqueline Coleman for the Democratic nomination.
