= The Niblets =

Group of rocks in the South Pacific Ocean pertaining to Antarctica

- Location within Antarctica

Geography
- Location: Antarctica
- Coordinates: 66°0′S 65°40′W

Administration
- Administered under the Antarctic Treaty System

Demographics
- Population: Uninhabited

The Niblets is a group of rocks in the South Pacific. Situated between Harp Island and Beer Island, lying 15 kilometres (8 nmi) west of Prospect Point, off the west coast of Graham Land. Charted and named by the British Graham Land Expedition (BGLE), 1934–37, under Rymill. The name suggests the small size of features in the group.

== See also ==
- List of Antarctic and sub-Antarctic islands
