= Beer Island =

Island in Graham Land, Antarctica

Beer Island (66°0′S 65°41′W) is an island in the South Pacific, 1 nautical mile (2 km) long, lying close to The Niblets and immediately south of Jagged Island and 8 nautical miles (15 km) west of Prospect Point, off the west coast of Graham Land. It was charted and named by the British Graham Land Expedition under John Rymill, 1934–37.

== See also ==
- List of Antarctic and sub-Antarctic islands
