= Wallsend Cove =

Cove on the Isle of Portland, England

Coordinates: 50.5247°N 2.4549°W

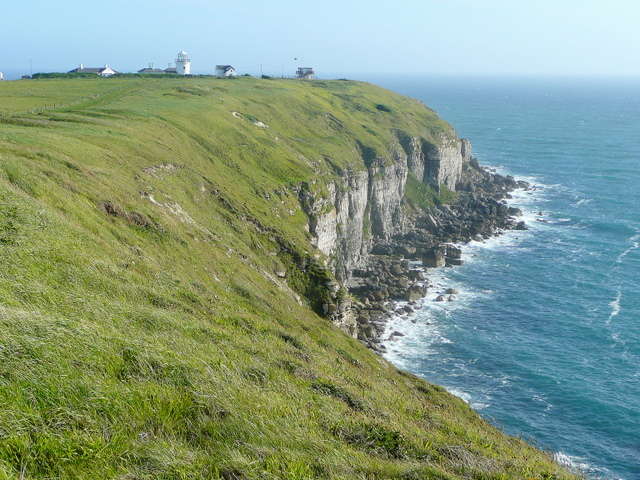
Wallsend Cove

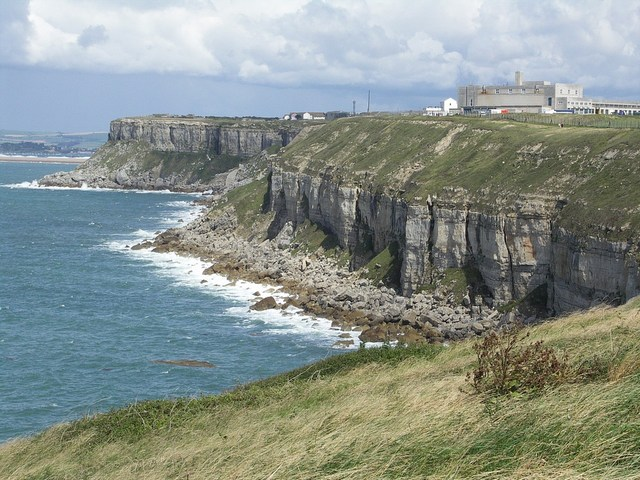
Wallsend Cove and part of Southwell Business Park.

Wallsend Cove is a cove, located on the Isle of Portland, Dorset, England; part of the Jurassic Coast. It is found on the west side of Portland, further south from Mutton Cove, and situated between Southwell Business Park and Portland Bill. The cliff tops above the cove are part of the South West Coast Path.

The cove's cliffs are often used by rock climbers, and are some of the biggest and best on Portland for climbing. Although the surrounding area of the cove features empty landscape, the limestone habitat is internationally important as it is home to many rare plants and insects.
