= Eric Deters =

American businessman and attorney

Eric Deters is an American businessman, events organizer, and former attorney.

== Early life and education ==
Deters attended Thomas More University and later Northern Kentucky University's Chase Law School.

== Career ==
In 2013, Deters' Kentucky law license was suspended for ethics infractions. In June 2021, the Kentucky Supreme Court upheld his suspension, in a ruling saying Deters' concept of the law is that "no Rules of Professional Responsibility, no statute, no case law bind him." Deters subsequently unsuccessfully ran for governor of Kentucky in 2023, and for the U.S. House of Representatives in 2024. Congressman Thomas Massie defeated Deters in the 2024 Republican primary for Kentucky's Fourth Congressional District.

In September 2026, Deters cancelled the annual Patriots Day Freedom Fest that he organized, citing lack of ticket sales.

In October 2026, The Wall Street Journal published an investigation into Deters' relationship with U.S. Ambassador to Greece Kimberly Guilfoyle. The report detailed conversations between Guilfoyle and Deters, who sought help from Guilfoyle in gaining the second Trump Administration's attention on personal legal and tax issues. Deters had promised as much as $1 million in payments if Guilfoyle was successful. Guilfoyle subsequently sent messages to the IRS chief as well as lobbied the Justice Department on Deters' behalf.

In 2025, Guilfoyle subsequently asked Deters for $100,000 she claimed she owed American Express in advance of her confirmation hearings as US ambassador to Greece. In a Signal message to Deters, Guilfoyle asked for the payment in a way that would not leave a paper trail, writing, "It won't show up anywhere if you wire money to American Express." Deters did not provide the money. Secretary of State Marco Rubio dismissed concerns about Guilfoyle's request to Deters.

In an interview with CBS News after the Journal article was published, Deters said he had "no doubt it was pay to play," referring to Guilfoyle's actions, and said "It was quid pro quo." He subsequently said that Guilfoyle should "lose her ambassadorship." Guilfoyle resigned from said ambassadorship on October 13, 2026.
