= Rocky Adkins =

American politician (born 1959)

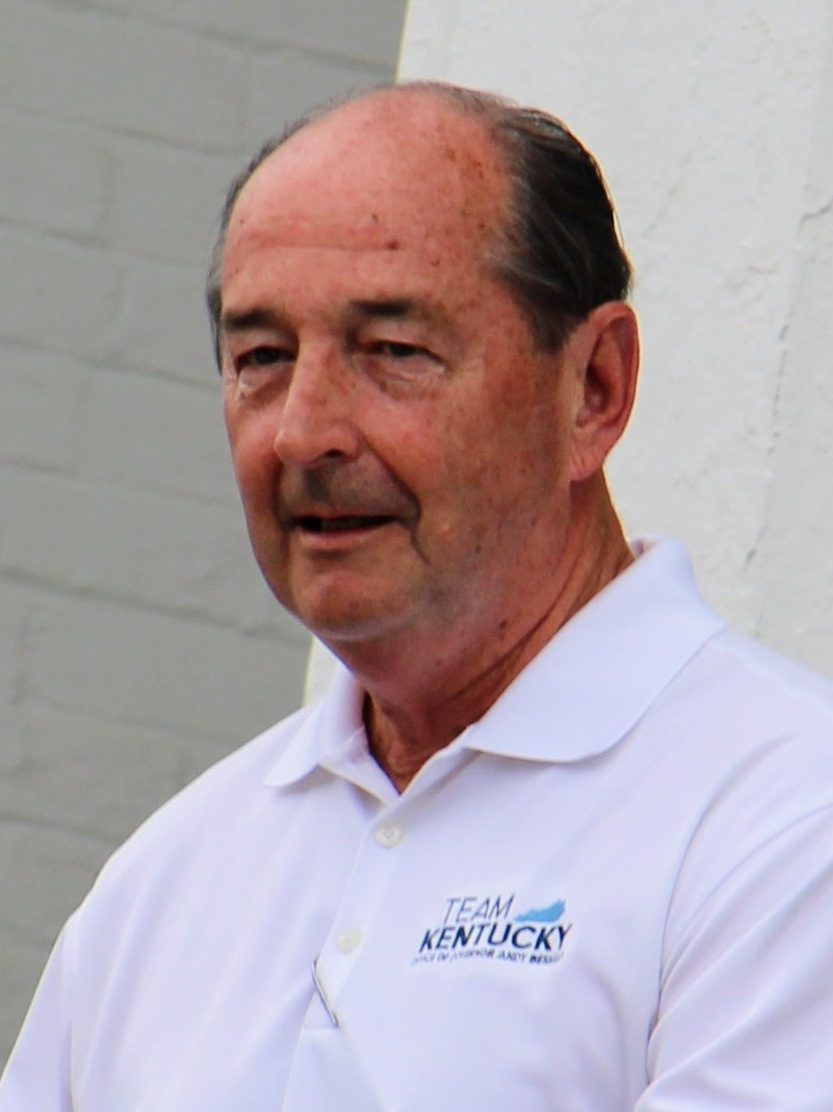
- Adkins in 2026

Minority Leader of the Kentucky House of Representatives
- In office January 3, 2017 – December 10, 2019
- Preceded by: Jeff Hoover
- Succeeded by: Joni Jenkins

Majority Leader of the Kentucky House of Representatives
- In office January 5, 2004 – January 3, 2017
- Preceded by: Greg Stumbo
- Succeeded by: Jonathan Shell

Member of the Kentucky House of Representatives from the 99th district
- In office January 1, 1987 – December 10, 2019
- Preceded by: Frances Brown
- Succeeded by: Richard White

Personal details
- Born: Rocky James Adkins; November 4, 1959 (age 67) Sandy Hook, Kentucky, U.S.
- Party: Democratic
- Spouse: Leah
- Children: 3
- Education: Morehead State University (BA, MA)

Rocky James Adkins (born November 4, 1959) is an American politician from Kentucky. A member of the Democratic Party, Adkins served as a senior advisor to Governor Andy Beshear from 2019 to 2026, and as a member of the Kentucky House of Representatives from 1987 to 2019. He represented Kentucky's 99th House district, which was located in eastern Kentucky and included Elliott, Lewis, and Rowan Counties. During his House tenure, he served as majority leader from 2003 to 2016, and minority leader from 2016 to 2019.

Adkins unsuccessfully ran for governor in the 2019 Kentucky gubernatorial election, finishing in second place in the Democratic primary behind then-Attorney General Andy Beshear. After Beshear won the general election that November, Adkins joined Beshear's administration as the governor's senior advisor, and held that role until he resigned in July 2026.

On July 21, 2026, he announced his candidacy for governor in 2027.

== Education ==
Adkins attended Elliott County High School and Morehead State University. He played college basketball for the Morehead State Eagles in 1981 and 1982 as the starting point guard. In college, he averaged 2.2 points and 2.7 assists per game. Adkins earned his bachelor's and master's degrees at Morehead State University. In 2017, Morehead's new dining commons were dedicated to and named after Adkins. He was inducted into the MSU Alumni Hall of Fame in 2004 and named the recipient of the 2012 Founders Award for University Service.

== Career ==
=== Kentucky legislature ===
Adkins was a member of the Kentucky House of Representatives between 1987 and 2019. He has long been a strong supporter of education in Eastern Kentucky. He was a member of the House Democratic Leadership office.

=== 2019 gubernatorial campaign ===
In November 2018, Adkins announced his candidacy for the 2019 Kentucky gubernatorial election. During his announcement, Adkins stated that Stephanie Horne, a member of the Jefferson County Board of Education, would be his running mate. Paul E. Patton, who served as Kentucky governor from 1995 to 2003, endorsed Adkins. During his campaign, he raised $1.5 million.

Adkins lost the Democratic primary on May 21, 2019, placing second to Attorney General Andy Beshear. Following his loss, Adkins endorsed Beshear in the general election. Beshear was ultimately elected, and re-elected in 2023. Following Beshear's victory, Adkins passed on the opportunity to challenge U.S. Senator Mitch McConnell in 2020, and instead joined the Beshear administration as the governor's senior advisor.

=== 2027 gubernatorial campaign ===
After spending nearly seven years in the Beshear administration, Adkins resigned his position as senior advisor on July 10, 2026, in what was seen as the first step to launching a second bid for the governorship in 2027. He formally announced his candidacy on July 21. Currently, the only other declared candidate for the Democratic primary is incumbent Lieutenant Governor Jacqueline Coleman.

== Political positions ==
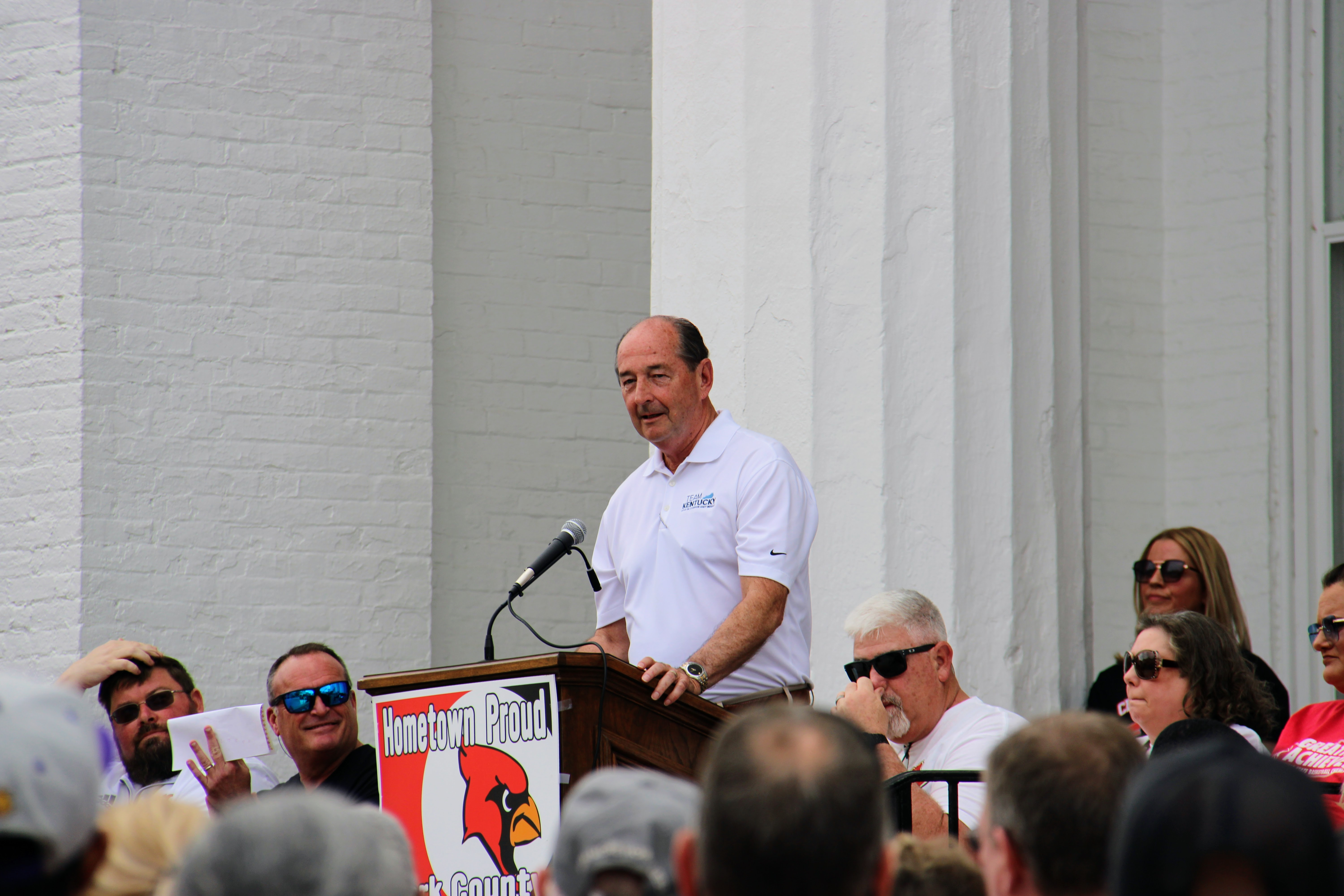
Rocky Adkins, senior advisor to Gov. Andy Beshear, addresses the crowd on April 12, 2026, during a parade in downtown Winchester celebrating George Rogers Clark's boys and girls basketball state championships.

Adkins supports "a fully-funded pension system" and the use of medicinal marijuana, which he believes could provide income to help fund public pensions. He also believes the state legislature needs to work with the federal government to try to expand Medicaid.

Adkins opposes increased regulation on gun ownership.

== Philanthropy ==
A cancer survivor himself, Adkins sponsors the annual "Rocky Adkins Charity Golf Outing – Cure for Cancer," which has raised over $2.3 million for cancer research since its beginning in 1995.

Kentucky House of Representatives
Preceded by Greg Stumbo	Majority Leader of the Kentucky House of Representatives; 2004–2017	Succeeded by Jonathan Shell
Preceded by Jeff Hoover	Minority Leader of the Kentucky House of Representatives; 2017–2019	Succeeded by Joni Jenkins
