= 2019 Kentucky gubernatorial election =

- November 5, 2019
- Turnout: 44.2% (▲13.7%)

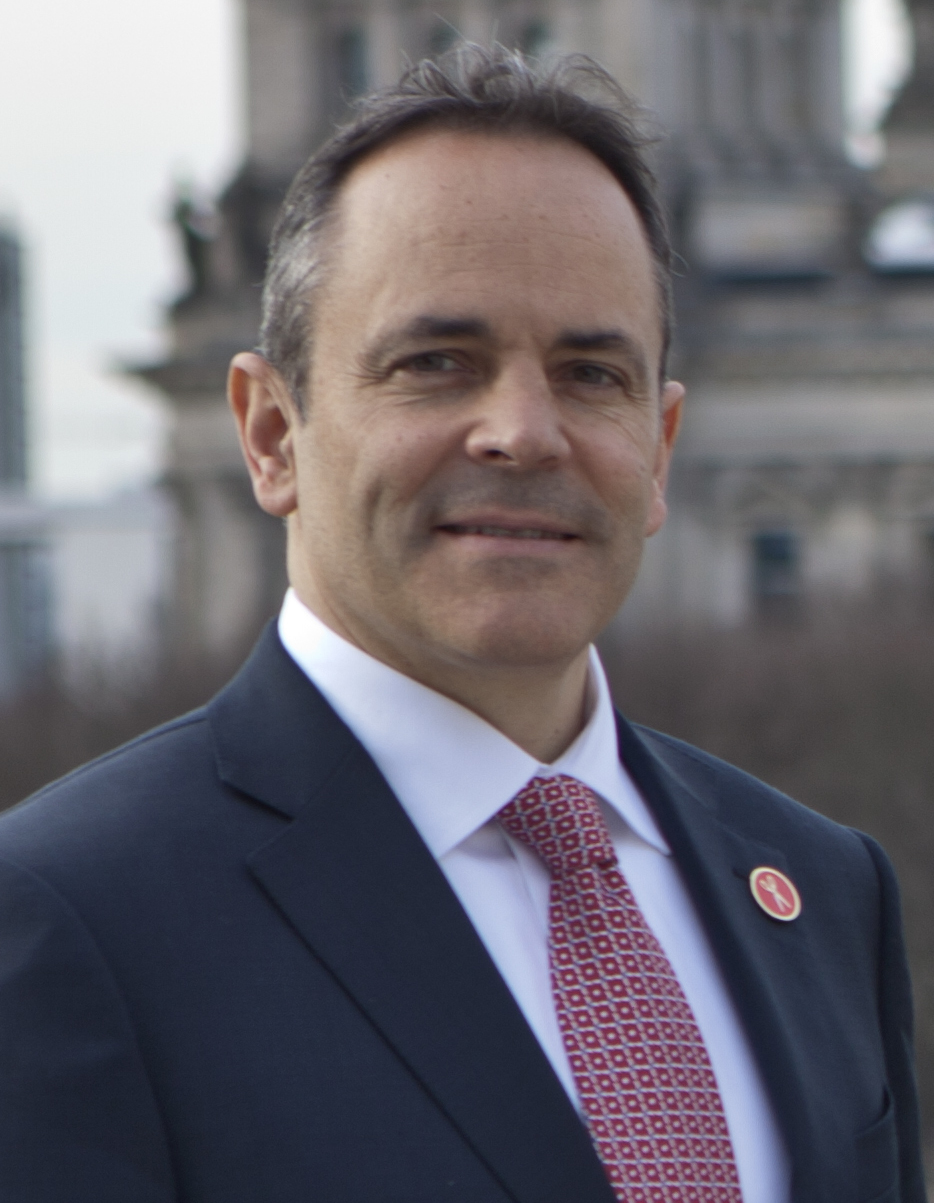
Nominee	Andy Beshear	Matt Bevin
Party	Democratic	Republican
Running mate	Jacqueline Coleman	Ralph Alvarado
Popular vote	709,890	704,754
Percentage	49.19%	48.84%
- Beshear: 40–50% 50–60% 60–70% 70–80% 80–90% >90% Bevin: 40–50% 50–60% 60–70% 70–80% 80–90% >90% Tie: 40–50% 50% No data
Governor before election
Matt Bevin
Republican
Elected Governor
Andy Beshear
Democratic

The 2019 Kentucky gubernatorial election took place on November 5, 2019, to elect the governor and lieutenant governor of Kentucky. The Democratic nominee, Andy Beshear, defeated Republican incumbent governor Matt Bevin. It was the closest gubernatorial election since 1915, and was the closest race of the 2019 gubernatorial election cycle. This was the only statewide victory in 2019 for Democrats in Kentucky.

Beshear won by 0.37 percentage points, receiving 49.20% of the vote to Bevin's 48.83%. Bevin won 97 counties, while Beshear won 23 counties. Beshear also carried only two of the state's six congressional districts, but those districts were the state's two most urbanized, the Louisville-based 3rd and the Lexington-based 6th.

Beshear won with overwhelming support in the major population hubs of Louisville and Lexington and their suburbs, as well as major vote swings in the Republican-leaning Cincinnati suburbs. Beshear was also aided by Bevin's lackluster performance in counties that had previously been swinging heavily towards Republicans, particularly the coal country of Eastern Kentucky, where Beshear won multiple counties that overwhelmingly voted Republican in 2016. Voter turnout was high across the state compared to past Kentucky elections, with a statewide turnout of about 42%. Fayette County (Lexington) saw a 20% increase in voter turnout, and Beshear received over twice as many votes in the county than the 2015 Democratic nominee for governor, Jack Conway. Unusually high turnout was seen as a major factor in Beshear's win.

Beshear's win coincided with Democratic momentum nationwide in elections in 2017, 2018, and 2019, following the election of Donald Trump in 2016. However, Republicans won all other statewide races in Kentucky in 2019, including the attorney general and secretary of state offices which Democrats had held going into the election.

Bevin conceded on November 14, after a recanvass took place that day that did not change the vote count. Libertarian John Hicks also qualified for the ballot and received 2% of the vote. Statewide turnout was just over 42%, much higher than for the 2015 gubernatorial election.

== Background ==
Major-party primary elections occurred on May 21, 2019. Incumbent Republican governor Matt Bevin was renominated by the Republican Party. Kentucky Attorney General Andy Beshear won the Democratic nomination with 37.9% of the vote in a three-way contest, in which due to his father he had the greatest name recognition.

Bevin announced on January 25, 2019, that he would run for a second term, choosing State Senator Ralph Alvarado as his running mate over incumbent lieutenant governor Jenean Hampton. No Republican governor of Kentucky has ever been elected to more than one term, even after the state's constitutional prohibition of governors serving consecutive terms was repealed in 1992. The only Republican before Bevin to run for reelection, Ernie Fletcher, was defeated by Democrat Steve Beshear in 2007 (Steve Beshear is the father of Bevin's Democratic challenger, Andy). Bevin was the second Republican governor of Kentucky in the last 50 years. Andy Beshear was the first governor of Kentucky to be a direct relative of a former governor.

Beshear had the support of 2020 Senate candidate Amy McGrath, his father and former governor Steve Beshear, former governor Paul Patton, and representative and primary challenger Rocky Adkins, all well-known Democrats in the state. Bevin had the support of President Donald Trump, who remained relatively popular in the state, particularly in rural areas. Trump and US senator Rand Paul held a rally in support of Bevin and Republican Attorney General nominee Daniel Cameron the day before the election. Many considered the decisive factor in this election whether voters would vote based on local issues, as Bevin and his policies were deeply unpopular, or as a referendum on Trump, with whom Bevin closely aligned. The former would be more favorable for Democrats, the latter for Republicans.

Bevin was the least popular governor in the United States, with a 33% approval rating in April 2019.

== Republican primary ==
=== Candidates ===
==== Nominated ====
- Matt Bevin, incumbent governor of Kentucky
  - Running mate: Ralph Alvarado, state senator

==== Eliminated in primary ====
- Robert Goforth, state representative
  - Running mate: Mike Hogan, county attorney of Lawrence County
- Ike Lawrence, candidate for mayor of Lexington in 2018
  - Running mate: James Anthony Rose, semi-retired
- William Woods, candidate for the 66th district in the Kentucky House of Representatives in 2012
  - Running mate: Justin Miller, mathematics and middle grades educator

==== Declined ====
- James Comer, incumbent U.S. representative and candidate for governor of Kentucky in 2015

=== Endorsements ===
Matt Bevin

U.S. executive branch officials

- Mike Pence, 48th vice president of the United States
- Donald Trump, 45th president of the United States

Individuals

- Ivanka Trump, daughter of U.S. president Donald Trump

=== Polling ===
Poll source	Date(s) administered	Sample size (Note: Key: A – all adults RV – registered voters LV – likely voters V – unclear)	Margin of error	Matt Bevin	Robert Goforth	Ike Lawrence	William Woods	Undecided
Cygnal	May 10–12, 2019	600	± 4.0%	56%	18%	2%	1%	23%

=== Results ===
Results by county: Bevin: 40–50%; 50–60%; 60–70%; 70–80%; 80–90%; Goforth: 40–50%; 50–60%; 60–70%; 70–80%

Republican primary results
Party	Candidate	Votes	%
Republican	Matt Bevin (incumbent); Ralph Alvarado	136,060	52.4%
Republican	Robert Goforth; Mike Hogan	101,343	39.0%
Republican	William Woods; Justin Miller	14,004	5.4%
Republican	Ike Lawrence; James Rose	8,447	3.3%
Total votes		259,854	100.0%

== Democratic primary ==
=== Candidates ===
==== Nominated ====
- Andy Beshear, Attorney General of Kentucky and son of former governor Steve Beshear
  - Running mate: Jacqueline Coleman, founder and president of Lead Kentucky, a non-profit organization focused on education policy reform

==== Eliminated in primary ====
- Rocky Adkins, minority leader of the Kentucky House of Representatives
  - Running mate: Stephanie Horne, former member of the Jefferson County Board of Education for the 3rd district
- Adam Edelen, former Auditor of Public Accounts of Kentucky
  - Running mate: Gill Holland, filmmaker and urban developer
- Geoff Young, perennial candidate, retired engineer, candidate for governor of Kentucky in 2015, candidate for Kentucky's 6th congressional district in 2014, 2016 and 2018, and Green Party nominee for the 45th district in the Kentucky House of Representatives in 2012
  - Running mate: Joshua N. French

==== Declined ====
- Alison Lundergan Grimes, Secretary of State of Kentucky and nominee for the U.S. Senate in 2014
- Amy McGrath, retired U.S. Marine and Democratic nominee for Kentucky's 6th congressional district in 2018 (ran for U.S. Senate against incumbent Mitch McConnell)
- Attica Scott, state representative and former Louisville city councilwoman

=== Endorsements ===
Rocky Adkins

Statewide officials

- Paul E. Patton, former governor of Kentucky
Andy Beshear

Statewide officials

- Crit Luallen, former lieutenant governor of Kentucky
Adam Edelen

Members of the Kentucky legislature

- Mary Lou Marzian, state representative
- Morgan McGarvey, minority leader of the Kentucky Senate

Current and former elected officials

- Ben Baker, current mayor of Dayton, Kentucky
- Fred Cowan, former attorney general of Kentucky
- John Cranley, current mayor of Cincinnati
- Angela Evans, Lexington councilmember
- David James, Louisville Metro Council president
- Mike Ward, former congressman from Kentucky's 3rd congressional district
- Louisville Metro Council members Brandon Coan and David Yates

Media

- The Courier-Journal, the largest newspaper in Kentucky
- Louisville Defender, the largest African-American newspaper in Louisville

Groups

- American Federation of State, County and Municipal Employees 4011
- The Fairness Campaign
- Jefferson County Teachers Association
- Kentuckians for the Commonwealth
- Sierra Club

=== Polling ===
Poll source	Date(s) administered	Sample size	Margin of error	Rocky Adkins	Andy Beshear	Adam Edelen	Undecided
Garin-Hart-Yang Research (D) (Note: Poll sponsored by the Andy Beshear campaign)	April 15–18, 2019	601	± 4.0%	17%	44%	16%	23%
ALG Research (D) (Note: Poll sponsored by the Adam Edelen campaign)	April 11–15, 2019	500	–	22%	43%	23%	–
Garin-Hart-Yang Research (D)	February 4–7, 2019	603	± 4.0%	17%	55%	7%	21%

=== Results ===
Results by county: Beshear: 30–40%; 40–50%; 50–60%; 60–70%; Adkins: 30–40%; 40–50%; 50–60%; 60–70%; 70–80%; 80–90%; 90–100%; Edelen: 30–40%; 60–70%

Democratic primary results
Party	Candidate	Votes	%
Democratic	Andy Beshear; Jacqueline Coleman	149,438	37.9%
Democratic	Rocky Adkins; Stephanie Horne	125,970	31.9%
Democratic	Adam Edelen; Gill Holland	110,159	27.9%
Democratic	Geoff Young; Josh French	8,923	2.3%
Total votes		394,490	100.0%

== Other candidates ==
=== Libertarian Convention ===
The Libertarian Party of Kentucky is currently recognized as a "political organization" under state law, a status that grants the party ballot access, but denies it a state-operated primary. Libertarian candidates were nominated at the party's nominating convention, held in March 2019.

Nominated

- John Hicks, IT consultant
  - Running mate: Ann Cormican, factory worker

=== Write-in ===
Declared

- Amy Husk (Socialist Workers Party), medical assistant and trade unionist
  - Running mate: Samir Hazboun, journalist
- Blackii Effing Whyte

== General election ==
=== Fundraising ===
Campaign finance reports as of November 5, 2019
Candidate	Raised	Spent	Cash on hand
Andy Beshear (D)	$5,474,916	$5,471,092	$3,824
Matt Bevin (R)	$5,263,345	$5,263,345	$0
Source: Kentucky Registry of Election Finance

=== Predictions ===
Source	Ranking	As of
The Cook Political Report	Tossup	October 15, 2019
Inside Elections	Tossup	November 8, 2019
Sabato's Crystal Ball	Lean R	November 8, 2019

=== Debates ===
Dates	Location	Bevin	Beshear	Hicks	Link
July 17, 2019	Louisville	Participant	Participant	Not invited	Full debate – Kentucky Farm Bureau
October 3, 2019	Paducah	Participant	Participant	Not invited	Full debate – Courier-Journal
October 15, 2019	Lexington	Participant	Participant	Not invited	Full debate – Courier-Journal
October 26, 2019	Louisville	Participant	Participant	Not invited	Full debate – WLKY
October 29, 2019	Highland Heights	Participant	Participant	Not invited	Full debate – WLWT

=== Endorsements ===
Matt Bevin (R)

Federal politicians

- Ben Carson, 17th United States Secretary of Housing and Urban Development
- Mike Pence, 48th vice president of the United States
- Donald Trump, 45th president of the United States

U.S. senators

- Rand Paul, U.S. senator (R-KY)

U.S. representatives

- Jim Jordan, U.S. representative (R-OH)
- Thomas Massie, U.S. representative (R-KY)
- Mark Meadows, U.S. representative (R-NC)
- Hal Rogers, U.S. representative (R-KY)

Governors

- Bill Lee, governor of Tennessee
- Scott Walker, former governor of Wisconsin

Individuals

- Kimberly Guilfoyle, television news personality
- Ronna McDaniel, chair of the RNC
- Sarah Sanders, former White House Press Secretary
- Donald Trump Jr., businessman

Organizations

- Kentucky Right to Life
- NRA Political Victory Fund

Newspapers

- Bowling Green Daily News
Andy Beshear (D)

Statewide officials

- Jerry Abramson, former lieutenant governor of Kentucky, former mayor of Louisville
- Jane Beshear, former First Lady of Kentucky; Andy Beshear's mother
- Steve Beshear, former governor of Kentucky; Andy Beshear's father
- Bill Cunningham, former Kentucky Supreme Court Justice, father of Congressman Joe Cunningham (D-SC)
- Adam Edelen, former auditor of Kentucky, chief of staff to the governor of Kentucky, candidate for governor of Kentucky in 2019
- Alison Lundergan Grimes, Kentucky Secretary of State
- Crit Luallen, former lieutenant governor of Kentucky, former auditor of Kentucky
- Judi Patton, former First Lady of Kentucky
- Paul E. Patton, former governor of Kentucky
- Billy Ray Smith, former agriculture commissioner of Kentucky

Local officials

- Stacey Abrams, 2018 Democratic nominee for governor of Georgia, former minority leader of the Georgia House of Representatives
- Rocky Adkins, minority leader of the Kentucky House of Representatives, candidate for governor of Kentucky in 2019
- Larry Clark, former State Representative
- Jeffery Donohue, state representative
- Eddie Girdler, former mayor of Somerset, Kentucky (Republican)
- Jim Gray, former mayor of Lexington
- Mike O'Connell, Jefferson County attorney
- Dorsey Ridley, former state senator
- Dean Schamore, state representative
- Dan Seum, state senator, 38th District (Republican)
- Roger Thomas, former state representative
- John Ward, Hardin County sheriff

Labor unions

- American Federation of State, County and Municipal Employees Council 962
- Communications Workers of America Local 3372
- International Brotherhood of Teamsters Local 84
- International Brotherhood of Teamsters Local 89
- International Brotherhood of Teamsters Local 651
- International Brotherhood of Teamsters Local 783
- International Union of Operating Engineers Local 181
- International Union of Painters and Allied Trades District Council 91
- Kentucky Education Association
- Kentucky Professional Fire Fighters
- Kentucky State AFL-CIO
- Kentucky State Building & Construction Trades Council
- Kentucky State Fraternal Order of Police
- National Conference of Firemen and Oilers
- Plumbers and Steamfitters Local 184
- Service Employees International Union District 1199 WV/KY/OH
- United Mine Workers of America
- United Steelworkers Kentucky

Newspapers

- The Courier-Journal
- Lexington Herald-Leader

Organizations

- Kentuckians for the Commonwealth
- Kentucky State AFL-CIO
- NARAL America

Individuals

- Grey DeLisle, voice actress and activist
- William Woods, candidate for governor of Kentucky in 2019, candidate for the 66th district in the Kentucky House of Representatives in 2012 (Republican)

=== Polling ===
View source data.

Poll source	Date(s) administered	Sample size	Margin of error	Matt Bevin (R)	Andy Beshear (D)	John Hicks (L)	Undecided
NBC News/Marist	October 30 – November 3, 2019	564 (LV)	± 5.2%	47%	47%	2%	4%
The Trafalgar Group (R)	October 29 – November 2, 2019	1,117 (LV)	± 3.0%	52%	47%	1%	0%
Targoz Market Research (D)	October 13–20, 2019	401 (LV)	± 4.2%	36%	55%	4%	6%
Mason-Dixon	October 10–13, 2019	625 (LV)	± 4.0%	46%	46%	1%	7%
Garin-Hart-Yang Research (D)	August 19–22, 2019	501 (LV)	± 4.4%	39%	48%	6%	7%
Clarity Campaign Labs (D) (Note: Poll sponsored by Democratic Attorney General Association)	August 12–13, 2019	792 (LV)	± 3.3%	39%	48%	5%	4%
Gravis Marketing (R)	June 11–12, 2019	741 (LV)	± 3.6%	48%	42%	–	10%
Lake Research Partners (D)	June 4–11, 2019	500 (RV)	± 4%	36%	51%	–	–
Mason-Dixon	December 12–15, 2018	625 (RV)	± 4.0%	40%	48%	–	12%

Hypothetical polling

with Rocky Adkins

Poll source	Date(s) administered	Sample size	Margin of error	Matt Bevin (R)	Rocky Adkins (D)	Undecided
Mason-Dixon	December 12–15, 2018	625 (RV)	± 4.0%	41%	42%	17%

with Alison Lundergan Grimes

Poll source	Date(s) administered	Sample size	Margin of error	Matt Bevin (R)	Alison Lundergan Grimes (D)	Undecided
Mason-Dixon	December 12–15, 2018	625 (RV)	± 4.0%	47%	46%	7%

with generic Democrat

Poll source	Date(s) administered	Sample size	Margin of error	Matt Bevin (R)	Generic Democrat	Undecided
Public Policy Polling (D) (Note: Poll sponsored by End Citizens United)	May 6–7, 2019	676	± 3.8%	39%	49%	11%

=== Results ===
2019 Kentucky gubernatorial election
Party	Candidate	Votes	%	±%
Democratic	Andy Beshear; Jacqueline Coleman	709,890	49.19	+5.38
Republican	Matthew G. Bevin (incumbent); Ralph A. Alvarado	704,754	48.84	−3.68
Libertarian	John Hicks; Ann Cormican	28,433	1.97	N/A
Write-in	Blackii Effing Whyte; Douglas G. Estridge	46	0.00	N/A
Total votes		1,443,123	100.0	N/A
Turnout		1,452,544	44.22	+13.65
Registered electors		3,284,547		
Democratic gain from Republican				

==== By congressional district ====
Beshear won despite carrying only two of the state's six congressional districts. He defeated Bevin in the 3rd and 6th districts, which encompass Kentucky's two urban centers, Louisville and Lexington, and their close-in suburbs. Bevin won the state's other urbanized district, the Northern Kentucky-based 4th, and he won handily in the more rural and less populated 1st, 2nd, and 5th districts.

District	PVI	Andy Beshear	Matt Bevin	Incumbent representative
1st	R+23	39%	59%	James Comer
2nd	R+19	44%	54%	Brett Guthrie
3rd	D+6	68%	31%	John Yarmuth
4th	R+18	45%	52%	Thomas Massie
5th	R+31	37%	61%	Hal Rogers
6th	R+9	56%	42%	Andy Barr

==== By county ====
County	Andy Beshear		Matt Bevin		John Hicks		Write-in		Margin		Total votes
County	%	#	%	#	%	#	%	#	%	#	Total votes
Adair	28.65%	1,626	69.53%	3,946	1.74%	99	0.07%	4	-40.88%	-2,320	5,675
Allen	31.06%	1,649	67.13%	3,564	1.81%	96	0.00%	0	-36.07%	-1,915	5,309
Anderson	41.50%	3,978	56.12%	5,380	2.37%	227	0.00%	0	-14.62%	-1,402	9,585
Ballard	32.90%	1,012	65.34%	2,010	1.76%	54	0.00%	0	-32.44%	-998	3,076
Barren	39.91%	5,280	58.15%	7,693	1.94%	256	0.00%	0	-18.24%	-2,413	13,229
Bath	51.98%	1,886	46.09%	1,672	1.93%	70	0.00%	0	5.89%	214	3,628
Bell	36.54%	2,013	61.68%	3,398	1.78%	98	0.00%	0	-25.14%	-1,385	5,509
Boone	41.42%	16,947	56.21%	23,000	2.37%	970	0.00%	1	-14.79%	-6,053	40,918
Bourbon	48.10%	3,323	50.12%	3,463	1.78%	123	0.00%	0	-2.02%	-140	6,909
Boyd	51.76%	6,989	45.79%	6,182	2.45%	331	0.00%	0	5.97%	807	13,502
Boyle	49.03%	5,099	49.07%	5,103	1.90%	198	0.00%	0	-0.04%	-4	10,400
Bracken	41.98%	1,063	53.99%	1,367	4.03%	102	0.00%	0	-12.01%	-304	2,532
Breathitt	50.21%	1,889	48.38%	1,820	1.41%	53	0.00%	0	1.83%	69	3,762
Breckinridge	40.53%	2,775	56.92%	3,897	2.56%	175	0.00%	0	-16.39%	-1,122	6,847
Bullitt	42.56%	11,275	54.80%	14,517	2.64%	700	0.00%	1	-12.24%	-3,242	26,493
Butler	29.99%	1,134	68.08%	2,574	1.93%	73	0.00%	0	-38.09%	-1,440	3,781
Caldwell	34.12%	1,510	64.25%	2,843	1.63%	72	0.00%	0	-30.13%	-1,333	4,425
Calloway	43.90%	5,160	53.97%	6,344	2.14%	251	0.00%	0	-10.07%	-1,184	11,755
Campbell	51.78%	16,352	46.20%	14,587	2.02%	638	0.00%	0	5.58%	1,765	31,577
Carlisle	27.93%	529	70.27%	1,331	1.80%	34	0.00%	0	-42.34%	-802	1,894
Carroll	45.14%	1,184	52.38%	1,374	2.48%	65	0.00%	0	-7.24%	-190	2,623
Carter	50.43%	3,732	46.51%	3,442	3.07%	227	0.00%	0	3.92%	290	7,401
Casey	25.14%	1,208	73.47%	3,530	1.37%	66	0.02%	1	-48.33%	-2,322	4,805
Christian	42.14%	6,023	55.79%	7,974	2.07%	296	0.00%	0	-13.65%	-1,951	14,293
Clark	45.58%	5,876	52.57%	6,777	1.85%	238	0.00%	0	-6.99%	-901	12,891
Clay	28.10%	1,298	69.82%	3,225	2.08%	96	0.00%	0	-41.72%	-1,927	4,619
Clinton	24.86%	692	73.53%	2,047	1.62%	45	0.00%	0	-48.67%	-1,355	2,784
Crittenden	30.96%	916	66.81%	1,977	2.23%	66	0.00%	0	-35.85%	-1,061	2,959
Cumberland	25.74%	503	72.57%	1,418	1.69%	33	0.00%	0	-46.83%	-915	1,954
Daviess	47.02%	16,012	50.62%	17,238	2.36%	805	0.00%	0	-3.60%	-1,226	34,055
Edmonson	37.12%	1,383	61.30%	2,284	1.58%	59	0.00%	0	-24.18%	-901	3,726
Elliott	59.27%	1,148	38.56%	747	2.17%	42	0.00%	0	20.71%	401	1,937
Estill	39.10%	1,617	58.68%	2,427	2.20%	91	0.02%	1	-19.58%	-810	4,136
Fayette	65.51%	73,397	32.95%	36,915	1.53%	1,719	0.00%	4	32.56%	36,482	112,035
Fleming	38.40%	1,807	59.88%	2,818	1.72%	81	0.00%	0	-21.48%	-1,011	4,706
Floyd	52.56%	5,903	44.95%	5,048	2.48%	279	0.00%	0	7.61%	855	11,230
Franklin	61.51%	12,888	36.13%	7,570	2.53%	493	0.00%	0	25.38%	5,318	21,230
Fulton	40.23%	589	58.54%	857	1.23%	18	0.00%	0	-18.31%	-268	1,464
Gallatin	39.99%	871	56.84%	1,238	3.17%	69	0.00%	0	-16.85%	-367	2,178
Garrard	34.56%	2,004	63.39%	3,676	2.05%	119	0.00%	0	-28.83%	-1,672	5,799
Grant	35.19%	2,261	62.41%	4,010	2.40%	154	0.00%	0	-27.22%	-1,749	6,425
Graves	32.90%	4,214	64.64%	8,278	2.46%	315	0.00%	0	-31.74%	-4,064	12,807
Grayson	32.20%	2,621	65.34%	5,319	2.47%	201	0.00%	0	-33.14%	-2,698	8,141
Green	26.19%	997	72.05%	2,743	1.76%	67	0.00%	0	-45.86%	-1,746	3,807
Greenup	45.29%	5,102	52.41%	5,905	2.30%	259	0.00%	0	-7.12%	-803	11,266
Hancock	51.75%	1,891	45.16%	1,650	3.09%	113	0.00%	0	6.59%	241	3,654
Hardin	46.47%	14,524	51.25%	16,018	2.27%	710	0.00%	0	-4.78%	-1,494	31,252
Harlan	28.85%	1,867	69.05%	4,468	2.10%	136	0.00%	0	-40.20%	-2,601	6,471
Harrison	42.91%	2,535	55.06%	3,253	2.03%	120	0.00%	0	-12.15%	-718	5,908
Hart	37.99%	1,997	59.80%	3,143	2.21%	116	0.00%	0	-21.81%	-1,146	5,256
Henderson	51.25%	6,863	47.07%	6,303	1.68%	225	0.00%	0	4.18%	560	13,391
Henry	42.23%	2,325	55.77%	3,070	2.00%	110	0.00%	0	-13.54%	-745	5,505
Hickman	30.01%	469	68.59%	1,072	1.41%	22	0.00%	0	-38.58%	-603	1,563
Hopkins	39.23%	5,411	58.56%	8,077	2.20%	304	0.00%	0	-19.33%	-2,666	13,792
Jackson	18.50%	749	79.38%	3,214	2.12%	86	0.00%	0	-60.88%	-2,465	4,049
Jefferson	66.99%	186,561	31.51%	87,740	1.50%	4,171	0.00%	7	35.48%	98,821	278,479
Jessamine	43.04%	8,102	55.05%	10,363	1.91%	360	0.01%	1	-12.01%	-2,261	18,826
Johnson	35.53%	2,304	61.51%	3,988	2.96%	192	0.00%	0	-25.98%	-1,684	6,484
Kenton	49.48%	25,479	48.42%	24,936	2.10%	1,082	0.00%	1	1.06%	543	51,498
Knott	49.38%	2,096	48.34%	2,052	2.17%	92	0.12%	5	1.04%	44	4,245
Knox	32.52%	2,658	65.41%	5,346	2.07%	169	0.00%	0	-32.89%	-2,688	8,173
Larue	37.11%	1,744	60.32%	2,835	2.57%	121	0.00%	0	-23.21%	-1,091	4,700
Laurel	26.55%	4,722	71.22%	12,667	2.23%	397	0.00%	0	-44.67%	-7,945	17,786
Lawrence	37.85%	1,515	60.38%	2,417	1.77%	71	0.00%	0	-22.53%	-902	4,003
Lee	33.04%	675	64.66%	1,321	2.30%	47	0.00%	0	-31.62%	-646	2,043
Leslie	22.51%	680	75.79%	2,289	2.37%	51	0.00%	0	-53.28%	-1,609	3,020
Letcher	44.85%	2,626	52.76%	3,089	2.37%	139	0.02%	1	-7.91%	-463	5,855
Lewis	27.28%	948	69.76%	2,424	2.96%	103	0.00%	0	-42.48%	-1,476	3,475
Lincoln	35.82%	2,558	62.03%	4,430	2.16%	154	0.00%	0	-26.21%	-1,872	7,142
Livingston	36.03%	1,205	62.32%	2,084	1.64%	55	0.00%	0	-26.29%	-879	3,344
Logan	38.29%	2,911	59.52%	4,525	2.18%	166	0.00%	0	-21.23%	-1,614	7,602
Lyon	40.75%	1,253	57.85%	1,779	1.40%	43	0.00%	0	-17.10%	-526	3,075
Madison	48.96%	15,017	48.72%	14,943	2.30%	705	0.03%	8	0.24%	74	30,673
Magoffin	53.57%	1,968	44.34%	1,629	2.10%	77	0.00%	0	9.23%	339	3,674
Marion	52.05%	3,155	45.98%	2,787	1.96%	119	0.00%	0	6.07%	368	6,061
Marshall	38.21%	4,834	59.49%	7,526	2.29%	290	0.00%	0	-21.28%	-2,692	12,650
Martin	25.12%	554	72.38%	1,596	2.49%	55	0.00%	0	-47.26%	-1,042	2,205
Mason	44.25%	2,246	53.57%	2,719	2.19%	111	0.00%	0	-9.32%	-473	5,076
McCracken	41.60%	9,695	56.87%	13,252	1.52%	355	0.00%	1	-15.27%	-3,557	23,303
McCreary	28.82%	1,340	68.42%	3,181	2.71%	126	0.04%	2	-39.60%	-1,841	4,649
McLean	38.02%	1,357	59.32%	2,117	2.66%	95	0.00%	0	-21.30%	-760	3,569
Meade	44.18%	3,984	53.09%	4,787	2.73%	246	0.00%	0	-8.91%	-803	9,017
Menifee	45.32%	959	52.60%	1,113	2.08%	44	0.00%	0	-7.28%	-154	2,116
Mercer	42.10%	3,541	56.09%	4,718	1.81%	152	0.00%	0	-13.99%	-1,177	8,411
Metcalfe	38.73%	1,495	58.65%	2,264	2.62%	101	0.00%	0	-19.92%	-769	3,860
Monroe	24.76%	837	73.43%	2,482	1.80%	61	0.00%	0	-48.67%	-1,645	3,380
Montgomery	44.59%	3,934	53.78%	4,745	1.63%	144	0.00%	0	-9.19%	-811	8,823
Morgan	46.01%	1,726	51.43%	1,929	2.56%	96	0.00%	0	-5.42%	-203	3,751
Muhlenberg	46.03%	4,019	52.12%	4,551	1.83%	160	0.02%	2	-6.09%	-532	8,732
Nelson	48.51%	7,387	49.32%	7,511	2.17%	331	0.00%	0	-0.81%	-124	15,229
Nicholas	49.49%	1,157	48.50%	1,134	2.01%	47	0.00%	0	0.99%	23	2,338
Ohio	40.29%	2,877	56.57%	4,040	3.14%	224	0.00%	0	-16.28%	-1,163	7,141
Oldham	46.32%	12,115	51.57%	13,488	2.11%	551	0.00%	0	-5.25%	-1,373	26,154
Owen	38.54%	1,419	59.61%	2,195	1.85%	68	0.00%	0	-21.07%	-776	3,682
Owsley	29.43%	402	68.23%	932	2.34%	32	0.00%	0	-38.80%	-530	1,366
Pendleton	36.27%	1,502	61.51%	2,547	2.22%	92	0.00%	0	-25.24%	-1,045	4,141
Perry	44.51%	3,183	53.90%	3,855	1.59%	114	0.00%	0	-9.39%	-672	7,152
Pike	42.93%	7,131	54.25%	9,011	2.81%	466	0.01%	1	-11.32%	-1,880	16,609
Powell	46.33%	1,791	51.66%	1,997	2.02%	78	0.00%	0	-5.33%	-206	3,866
Pulaski	27.96%	5,891	70.04%	14,756	1.99%	419	0.00%	1	-42.08%	-8,865	21,067
Robertson	42.15%	325	55.77%	430	2.08%	16	0.00%	0	-13.62%	-105	771
Rockcastle	27.42%	1,354	70.49%	3,481	2.07%	102	0.02%	1	-43.07%	-2,127	4,938
Rowan	58.47%	4,045	39.66%	2,744	1.86%	129	0.00%	0	18.81%	1,301	6,918
Russell	26.50%	1,571	71.73%	4,252	1.77%	105	0.00%	0	-45.23%	-2,681	5,928
Scott	49.10%	9,827	48.61%	9,730	2.29%	458	0.00%	0	0.49%	97	20,015
Shelby	43.96%	7,380	53.98%	9,062	2.04%	343	0.01%	2	-10.02%	-1,682	16,787
Simpson	46.48%	2,203	51.84%	2,457	1.69%	80	0.00%	0	-5.36%	-254	4,740
Spencer	35.59%	2,667	62.24%	4,664	2.15%	161	0.01%	1	-26.65%	-1,997	7,493
Taylor	36.87%	3,093	61.31%	5,143	1.82%	153	0.00%	0	-24.44%	-2,050	8,389
Todd	36.64%	1,037	60.53%	1,713	2.83%	80	0.00%	0	-23.89%	-676	2,830
Trigg	35.69%	1,622	62.46%	2,839	1.85%	84	0.00%	0	-26.77%	-1,217	4,545
Trimble	39.06%	1,057	58.39%	1,580	2.55%	69	0.00%	0	-19.33%	-523	2,706
Union	41.09%	1,800	56.68%	2,483	2.24%	98	0.00%	0	-15.59%	-683	4,381
Warren	50.80%	18,249	47.65%	17,118	1.55%	558	0.00%	0	3.15%	1,131	35,925
Washington	41.26%	1,839	56.59%	2,522	2.15%	96	0.00%	0	-15.33%	-683	4,457
Wayne	35.76%	1,983	62.61%	3,472	1.62%	90	0.00%	0	-26.85%	-1,489	5,545
Webster	38.77%	1,495	58.90%	2,271	2.33%	90	0.00%	0	-20.13%	-776	3,856
Whitley	30.30%	2,995	67.50%	6,672	2.21%	218	0.00%	0	-37.20%	-3,677	9,885
Wolfe	54.50%	1,194	43.72%	958	1.78%	39	0.00%	0	10.78%	236	2,191
Woodford	53.11%	6,235	44.95%	5,277	1.93%	227	0.00%	0	8.16%	958	11,739

Counties that flipped from Democratic to Republican

- Bourbon (largest city: Paris)
- Carroll (largest city: Carrollton)
- Union (largest city: Morganfield)

Counties that flipped from Republican to Democratic

- Boyd (largest city: Ashland)
- Breathitt (largest city: Jackson)
- Campbell (largest city: Fort Thomas)
- Carter (largest city: Grayson)
- Hancock (largest city: Hawesville)
- Kenton (largest city: Covington)
- Knott (largest city: Hindman)
- Madison (largest city: Richmond)
- Magoffin (largest city: Salyersville)
- Scott (largest city: Georgetown)
- Warren (largest city: Bowling Green)
- Woodford (largest city: Versailles)

== Analysis ==
Losing by a margin of less than 0.4 percentage points, Bevin did not immediately concede, and requested a recanvass, or review, of counted votes, which was held on November 14. According to the Kentucky state constitution, the swearing in of a Kentucky governor must be held on the fifth Tuesday following the election (December 10). While a recount law does exist in Kentucky, it does not permit recounts for gubernatorial elections. Should a candidate contest the election results, the state legislature would determine the winner after hearing a report from a randomly selected 11-member committee from the House (8) and Senate (3). This process, which is enforced through the Goebel Election Law, has only been used once, during the 1899 Kentucky gubernatorial election. Kentucky Senate President Robert Stivers and some other Republican members of the Kentucky state legislature expressed skepticism of Bevin's voter fraud claims and on November 7 urged Bevin to concede if the recanvass did not go in his favor. On November 11, U.S. Senate Majority Leader Mitch McConnell, a Kentucky Republican, announced that "all indications are" Beshear would be the next governor. The recanvass did not result in any changes in the vote totals for either Beshear or Bevin, but found an additional vote for write-in candidate Blackii Effing Whyte.

Bevin carried 97 of Kentucky's 120 counties. However, Beshear swamped Bevin in urban areas. Beshear carried the state's two largest counties, Jefferson and Fayette–home to Louisville and Lexington, respectively–with over 60 percent of the vote. He also narrowly carried two of the three counties that make up the traditionally conservative Cincinnati suburbs, Kenton and Campbell.

=== Recanvassing ===
Beshear declared victory after the initial vote count, selecting J. Michael Brown to lead his transition team. Bevin refused to concede and requested a recanvassing of the vote, which took place on November 14. A recanvassing is a reprint of the voting receipts from each voting machine and is done to make sure county officials recorded vote totals correctly. It is not a recount, which the Kentucky State Constitution does not permit for gubernatorial races. The recanvass resulted in only one change, an additional vote for Independent candidate Blackii Effing Whyte, and Bevin conceded that day.

With the recanvass producing no change in his vote total, Bevin conceded the race on November 14. Beshear was sworn in as governor on December 10, 2019.

== See also ==
- 2019 United States elections
- 2019 Kentucky elections

== Notes ==
Partisan clients
