= Mutton Cove, Portland =

Cove in Portland, Dorset, England, UK

Coordinates: 50.5393°N 2.4534°W

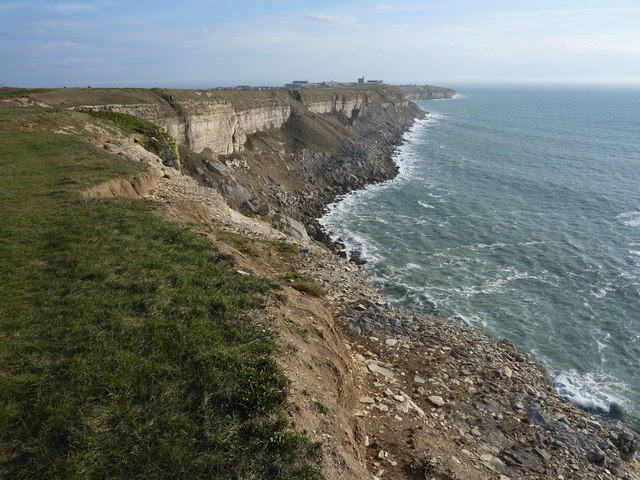
Mutton Cove

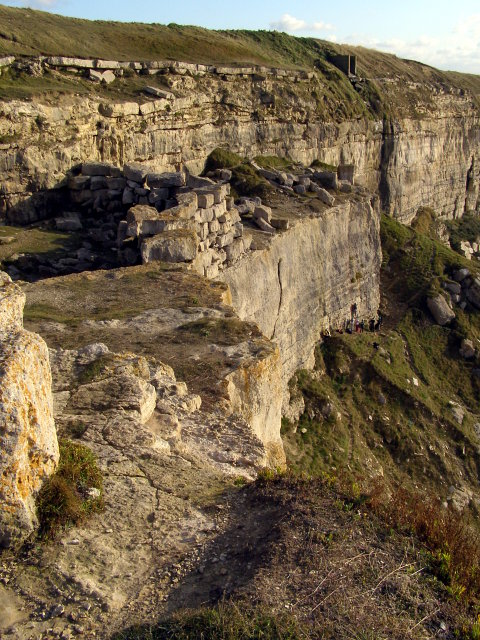
Disused quarry above Mutton Cove

Mutton Cove is a cove, located on the Isle of Portland, Dorset, England; part of the Jurassic Coast. It is found on the west side of Portland. Presumably named after the Portland sheep, the cove is an erosional indentation just south of the promontory of Blacknor. On the cliff tops of the cove is part of the South West Coast Path and further south is Wallsend Cove and Portland Bill.

Mutton Cove is a popular climbing area and is also notable for its fossilised remains. The area around Blacknor Point and Mutton Cove is known to be a good fishing spot for large Conger and local charter boats have been reported to have been coming in close to the cove following large shoals of herring. The area is also a popular spot for scuba divers.

Like the majority of Portland's coastline, the cove has been the place of past quarrying and a number of shipwrecks and maritime incidents, including German liner Bulow, the Ehen, a French barque, and Myrtledene, an English cargo vessel.
