= 2023 Kentucky gubernatorial election =

- November 7, 2023
- Turnout: 38.1% (▼6.2%)

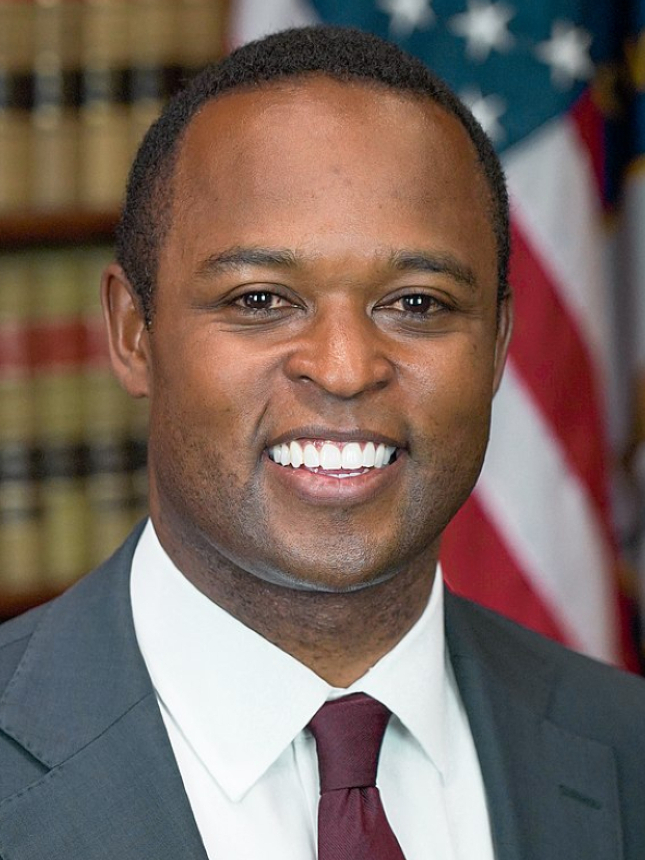
Nominee	Andy Beshear	Daniel Cameron
Party	Democratic	Republican
Running mate	Jacqueline Coleman	Robby Mills
Popular vote	694,482	627,457
Percentage	52.53%	47.46%
- Beshear: 50–60% 60–70% 70–80% 80–90% >90% Cameron: 50–60% 60–70% 70–80% 80–90% 90–100% Tie: 40–50% 50% No data
Governor before election
Andy Beshear
Democratic
Elected Governor
Andy Beshear
Democratic

The 2023 Kentucky gubernatorial election was held on November 7, 2023, to elect the governor and lieutenant governor of Kentucky. Incumbent Democratic governor Andy Beshear won re-election to a second term, defeating Republican state Attorney General Daniel Cameron. This was the only statewide victory in 2023 for Democrats in Kentucky, and one of only two nationwide.

This race was one of two Democratic-held governorships up for election in 2023 in a state Donald Trump won in 2020. The other was held in Louisiana, where the incumbent Democratic governor was ineligible to seek re-election, and which Jeff Landry flipped for the Republicans.

This was the first gubernatorial election in the state's history in which both major party candidates had held the position of attorney general; Beshear held the position from 2016 to 2019, after which he was succeeded by Cameron.

Beshear's victory has been attributed to his broad popularity among Democrats and independents, as well as approximately half of Republicans in the state. Compared to 2019, Beshear most improved his performance in suburban precincts; he increased his margins by nearly 6 percentage points in suburban areas, compared to 4.5 percentage points in urban and rural precincts.

== Background ==
A socially conservative southern state, Kentucky is considered safely Republican in federal elections, with Republicans holding both of its U.S. Senate seats and all but one of its U.S. House seats. In the 2020 presidential election, Republican Donald Trump carried Kentucky by 26 percentage points. However, the state was much more competitive as recently as the 1990s, when it voted for Bill Clinton twice, and Democrats remain competitive in many local and some state-level elections.

Beshear was first elected in 2019, narrowly defeating incumbent Republican Matt Bevin, who had become widely unpopular for signing a pension reform bill for teachers and opposing a subsequent teachers' strike. In that same year, Cameron was elected attorney general, becoming the first African-American to be elected to that position.

Cameron gained national recognition as attorney general, especially due to his involvement in the Breonna Taylor case in 2020. He spoke at the 2020 Republican National Convention on August 25, 2020. In September 2020, Cameron appeared on a shortlist of potential nominees to replace Ruth Bader Ginsburg on the Supreme Court by President Trump.

On May 16, 2023, Cameron won the Republican nomination with 47.7% of the vote, a 26% margin over the second-place candidate, and Beshear won the Democratic nomination with 91.3% of the vote over two perennial candidates.

== Democratic primary ==
=== Candidates ===
==== Nominee ====
- Andy Beshear, incumbent governor
  - Running mate: Jacqueline Coleman, incumbent lieutenant governor

==== Eliminated in primary ====
- Peppy Martin, businesswoman, consultant, perennial candidate, and Republican nominee for governor in 1999
- Geoff Young, perennial candidate (Note: Green nominee for Kentucky's 45th House district in 2012; Democratic candidate for Kentucky's 6th congressional district in 2014, 2016, and 2018, Republican candidate in 2020, and Democratic nominee in 2022; Democratic candidate for governor in 2015 and 2019)

=== Endorsements ===
Andy Beshear

Organizations

- Kentucky AFL–CIO
- Kentucky Democratic Party
- United Mine Workers of America

Newspapers and other media

- Lexington Herald-Leader

=== Fundraising ===
Beshear was the only candidate who filed a financial disclosure.

Campaign finance reports as of January 3, 2023
Candidate	Raised	Cash on hand
Andy Beshear	$647,000	$7,400,000

=== Results ===
County results Beshear: 70–80%; 80–90%; 90–100%

Congressional district results Beshear: 80–90%; 90–100%

Democratic primary results
Party	Candidate	Votes	%
Democratic	Andy Beshear (incumbent)	176,589	91.3
Democratic	Geoff Young	9,865	5.1
Democratic	Peppy Martin	6,913	3.6
Total votes		193,367	100.0

== Republican primary ==
=== Candidates ===
==== Nominee ====
- Daniel Cameron, Attorney General of Kentucky

==== Eliminated in primary ====
- Jacob Clark
- David Cooper, member of the Kentucky Army National Guard
- Kelly Craft, former U.S. Ambassador to the United Nations
  - Running mate: Max Wise, state senator
- Eric Deters, suspended attorney
  - Running mate: Wesley Deters, former Park Hills city councilor (no relation to Eric Deters)
- Bob DeVore, former McCreary County Board of Education member (2001–2007) and perennial candidate (Note: Candidate for Kentucky's 16th Senate district in 2006; candidate for Kentucky's 3rd congressional district in 2008, 2012, 2016, and 2022; candidate for Kentucky's 46th House district in 2010 and nominee in 2020; Republican nominee for Mayor of Louisville in 2014 and candidate in 2018)
- Mike Harmon, Kentucky state auditor
- Alan Keck, mayor of Somerset
- Dennis Ormerod
- Ryan Quarles, Kentucky Commissioner of Agriculture
- Johnny Rice, militia activist and former police officer
- Robbie Smith, high school teacher

==== Did not file ====
- Anthony Moore, wellwater drilling contractor

==== Withdrew ====
- Savannah Maddox, state representative

==== Declined ====
- Ralph Alvarado, state senator and nominee for lieutenant governor in 2019 (appointed commissioner of the Tennessee Department of Health)
- Allison Ball, Kentucky State Treasurer (ran for state auditor)
- Matt Bevin, former governor
- James Comer, U.S. representative for Kentucky's 1st congressional district and candidate for governor in 2015 (endorsed Craft)
- Max Wise, state senator (ran for lieutenant governor with Craft)

=== Endorsements ===
Daniel Cameron

Executive branch officials

- Donald Trump, 45th president of the United States (2017–2021)

State legislators

- Kevin Bratcher, state representative from the 29th district (1997–2025)

Individuals

- Marjorie Dannenfelser, president of Susan B. Anthony Pro-Life America (1993–present)
- Mark Levin, radio host

Organizations

- Kentucky Right to Life Committee (co-endorsed with Harmon and Quarles)
- Susan B. Anthony Pro-Life America
Kelly Craft

Executive branch officials

- Mike Pompeo, 70th United States secretary of state (2018–2021), 8th director of the Central Intelligence Agency (2017–2018), and former U.S. representative from KS-04 (2011–2017)

Statewide officials

- Ron DeSantis, 46th governor of Florida (2019–present) and former U.S. representative from FL-06 (2013–2018)

U.S. senators

- Ted Cruz, U.S. senator from Texas (2013–present) and candidate for president in 2016

U.S. representatives

- James Comer, U.S. representative from KY-01 (2016–present) and former Kentucky Commissioner of Agriculture (2012–2016)

State legislators

- Josh Branscum, state representative from the 83rd district (2021–present)
- Jason Nemes, state representative from the 33rd district (2017–present)
- Michael Pollock, state representative from 51st district (2021–present)
- Steve Riley, state representative from the 23rd district (2017–present)
- Max Wise, state senator from the 16th district (2015–present) (Craft's running mate)

Individuals

- Vivek Ramaswamy, entrepreneur and 2024 presidential candidate
- Jeff Roe, political consultant and strategist
Mike Harmon

Organizations

- Kentucky Right to Life Committee (co-endorsed with Cameron and Quarles)
Savannah Maddox (withdrawn)

U.S. representatives

- Thomas Massie, U.S. representative from KY-04 (2012–present)

Organizations

- Republican Liberty Caucus
Ryan Quarles

State legislators

- Matt Castlen, state senator from the 8th district (2019–2023)
- Paul Hornback, former state senator from the 20th district (2011–2023)
- Jason Howell, state senator from the 1st district (2021–present)
- Mike Wilson, state senator from the 32nd district (2011–present)
- 21 state representatives

Organizations

- Kentucky Right to Life Committee (co-endorsed with Harmon and Cameron)

Newspapers

- Lexington Herald-Leader (primary only)

=== Fundraising ===
Financial disclosures for major candidates are below:

Campaign finance reports as of April 18, 2023
Candidate	Raised	Spent	Cash on hand
Daniel Cameron	$1,370,904	$777,446	$593,458
Kelly Craft	$8,563,233 (Note: $7,001,000 of this total was self-funded by Craft)	$8,156,315	$406,918
Eric Deters	$669,064 (Note: $52,500 of this total was self-funded by Deters)	$659,746	$9,319
Mike Harmon	$84,547 (Note: $10,772 of this total was self-funded by Harmon)	$70,693	$13,854
Alan Keck	$311,717 (Note: $32,000 of this total was self-funded by Keck)	$257,577	$54,139
Ryan Quarles	$1,202,650	$299,419	$903,231

=== Debates ===
2023 Republican primary debates
No.	Date	Host	Moderator	Link	Participants					
Key: P Participant A Absent N Non-invitee I Invitee W Withdrawn
Key: P Participant A Absent N Non-invitee I Invitee W Withdrawn					Daniel Cameron	Kelly Craft	Eric Deters	Mike Harmon	Alan Keck	Ryan Quarles
1	March 7, 2023	Jefferson County Republican Party; Spectrum News 1 Kentucky	Mario Anderson	Spectrum News 1	P	A	N	P	P	P
2	April 26, 2023	Kenton County Republican Party; WCPO; LINK nky	Evan Millward; Shane Noem; Mark Payne	YouTube	A	A	P	P	P	P
3	May 1, 2023	Kentucky Educational Television	Renee Shaw	YouTube	P	P	P	N	P	P
4	May 8, 2023	WKYT; Transylvania University	Bill Bryant	WSAZ	A	A	P	P	N	P
5	May 9, 2023	WDKY	Marvin Bartlett; Gilbert Corsey; Ashley Kirklen	WDKY	P	A	P	N	N	P

=== Polling ===
==== Graphical summary ====
Poll source	Date(s) administered	Sample size (Note: Key: A – all adults RV – registered voters LV – likely voters V – unclear)	Margin of error	Daniel Cameron	David Cooper	Kelly Craft	Eric Deters	Bob DeVore	Mike Harmon	Alan Keck	Savannah Maddox	Ryan Quarles	Robbie Smith	Other	Undecided
Emerson College	May 10–12, 2023	500 (LV)	± 4.3%	33%	2%	18%	10%	<1%	4%	3%	–	13%	<1%	<1% (Note: Ormerod with 0.5%)	13%
Emerson College	April 10–11, 2023	900 (LV)	± 3.2%	30%	<1%	24%	6%	<1%	2%	<1%	–	15%	<1%	<1% (Note: Jacob Clark with 0.5%)	21%
Mason-Dixon	January 18–23, 2023	404 (LV)	± 5%	39%	1%	13%	2%	1%	5%	2%	–	8%	1%	–	28%
Meeting Street (Note: This poll was sponsored by Cameron's campaign)	January 9–11, 2023	500 (LV)	± 4.4%	39%	–	8%	2%	–	2%	1%	–	8%	–	2%	38%
	December 20, 2022	Maddox withdraws from the race													
co/efficient (R)	June 13–14, 2022	974 (LV)	± 3.5%	46%	–	3%	4%	–	5%	–	7%	9%	–	3%	22%

=== Results ===
County results Cameron: 30–40%; 40–50%; 50–60%; 60–70%; Quarles: 30–40%; 40–50%; Craft: 30–40%; 40–50%; 50–60%

Congressional district results Cameron: 40–50%; 50–60%

Republican primary results
Party	Candidate	Votes	%
Republican	Daniel Cameron	144,576	47.7
Republican	Ryan Quarles	65,718	21.7
Republican	Kelly Craft	52,170	17.2
Republican	Eric Deters	17,464	5.8
Republican	Mike Harmon	7,797	2.6
Republican	Alan Keck	7,317	2.4
Republican	David Cooper	2,282	0.8
Republican	Jacob Clark	1,900	0.6
Republican	Robbie Smith	1,388	0.5
Republican	Bob DeVore	931	0.3
Republican	Johnny Rice	726	0.2
Republican	Dennis Ormerod	696	0.2
Total votes		302,965	100.0

== General election ==
A viral ad featuring Hadley Duvall, who had been raped and impregnated by her stepfather at age 12, was widely credited by Republican leadership for contributing to Beshear's victory, as Kentucky was one of 12 states that had anti-abortion laws that allowed no exceptions for rape or incest, which was initially supported by Cameron.

=== Predictions ===
Source	Ranking	As of
The Cook Political Report	Lean D	July 21, 2023
Inside Elections	Tilt D	September 1, 2023
Sabato's Crystal Ball	Lean D	October 16, 2023
Elections Daily	Lean D	November 7, 2023

=== Debates ===
2023 Kentucky gubernatorial debates
No.	Date	Host	Link	Democratic	Republican
P Participant A Absent I Invitee					
P Participant A Absent I Invitee				Andy Beshear	Daniel Cameron
1	October 16, 2023	Northern Kentucky University	YouTube	P	P
2	October 21, 2023	League of Women Voters	YouTube	P	P
3	October 23, 2023	Kentucky Educational Television	YouTube	P	P
4	October 24, 2023	WKYT	WKYT	P	P

=== Fundraising ===
Campaign finance reports as of November 7, 2023
Candidate	Raised	Spent	Cash on hand
Andy Beshear (D)	$18,968,345	$18,963,018	$5,327
Daniel Cameron (R)	$4,349,178	$4,316,097	$33,081
Source: Kentucky Registry of Election Finance

=== Endorsements ===
Andy Beshear (D)

U.S. representatives

- Morgan McGarvey, U.S. representative from KY-03 (2023–present)

Statewide officials

- Steve Beshear, former governor of Kentucky (2007–2015) (candidate's father)
- Collin O'Mara, former Delaware Secretary of Natural Resources and Environmental Control (2009–2014)

State legislators

- Rocky Adkins, former state representative from the 99th district (1987–2019) and state house majority leader
- Gerald Neal, state senator from the 33rd district (1989–present)

Municipal officials

- John Hunt, Floyd County sheriff (2014–present)
- Ramon Pineiroa, Nelson County sheriff (2020–present)
- John Ward, Hardin County sheriff (2014–present)

Newspapers and other media

- Lexington Herald-Leader
- The Mountain Eagle

Individuals

- Jack Harlow, rapper and actor

Organizations

- Communications Workers of America
- Fairness Campaign
- Kentucky AFL–CIO
- Kentucky National Education Association
- Kentucky Professional Fire Fighters
- National Wildlife Federation Action Fund
- United Mine Workers of America

Political parties

- Kentucky Democratic Party
Daniel Cameron (R)

Executive branch officials

- Ben Carson, 17th U.S. Secretary of Housing and Urban Development (2017–2021)
- Donald Trump, 45th president of the United States (2017–2021)

U.S. senators

- Ted Budd, U.S. senator from North Carolina (2023–present)
- Mitch McConnell, Senate Minority Leader (2007–2015, 2021–2025), former Senate Majority Leader (2015–2021), and U.S. senator from Kentucky (1985–present)
- Rand Paul, U.S. senator from Kentucky (2011–present)
- JD Vance, U.S. senator from Ohio (2023–2025)

U.S. representatives

- Andy Barr, U.S. representative from KY-06 (2013–present)
- James Comer, U.S. representative from KY-01 (2016–present) and former Kentucky Commissioner of Agriculture (2012–2016)
- Brett Guthrie, U.S. representative from KY-02 (2009–present)
- Thomas Massie, U.S. representative from KY-04 (2012–present)
- Hal Rogers, U.S. representative from KY-05 (1981–present)

Governors

- Brian Kemp, governor of Georgia (2019–present)
- Sarah Huckabee Sanders, governor of Arkansas (2023–present)
- Glenn Youngkin, governor of Virginia (2022–2026)

State senators

- Gary Boswell, state senator from the 8th district (2023–present)
- Robby Mills, state senator from the 4th district (2019–present) (candidate's running mate)
- Brandon Smith, state senator from the 30th district (2008–present)
- Lindsey Tichenor, state senator from the 6th district (2023–present)

State representatives

- Kevin Bratcher, state representative from the 29th district (1997–2025)
- Myron Dossett, state representative from the 9th district (2007–present)
- Jim Gooch Jr., state representative from the 12th district (1995–present)
- Kevin Jackson, state representative from the 20th district (2023–present)
- D.J. Johnson, state representative from the 13th district (2017–2019, 2023–present)
- Scott Lewis, state representative from the 14th district (2019–present)
- David Meade, state representative from the 80th district (2013–present)
- Suzanne Miles, state representative from the 7th district (2013–present)

Municipal officials

- Jerry Gilliam, Christian County judge-executive (2023–present)
- Mark Metcalf, Garrard County attorney (2010–2024)
- Berl Perdue Jr., Clark County sheriff (2007–present)

Individuals

- Marjorie Dannenfelser, president of Susan B. Anthony Pro-Life America (1993–present)
- Mark Levin, radio host
- Kelley Paul, political consultant and wife of U.S. senator Rand Paul

Organizations

- American Principles Project
- Club for Growth
- Kentucky Right to Life Committee
- Kentucky State Fraternal Order of Police
- National Rifle Association Political Victory Fund
- Susan B. Anthony Pro-Life America

=== Polling ===
Graphical summary

Poll source	Date(s) administered	Sample size	Margin of error	Andy Beshear (D)	Daniel Cameron (R)	Other	Undecided
Concord Public Opinion Partners (Note: Poll commissioned by Education Reform Now Advocacy)	November 1–2, 2023	470 (LV)	± 4.5%	48%	40%	–	12%
Data for Progress (D)	November 1–2, 2023	660 (LV)	± 4.0%	50%	48%	–	2%
Emerson College	October 30 – November 2, 2023	1,000 (LV)	± 3.0%	47%	47%	2% (Note: "Someone Else" with 2%)	4%
co/efficient (R) (Note: Poll commissioned by the Bluegrass Freedom Action PAC)	October 18–19, 2023	1,845 (LV)	± 3.2%	47%	45%	−	8%
Garin-Hart-Yang (D) (Note: Poll sponsored by Beshear's campaign)	October 14–16, 2023	721 (LV)	± 3.6%	52%	44%	−	4%
Emerson College	October 1–3, 2023	450 (RV)	± 4.6%	49%	33%	5% (Note: "Someone else" with 5%)	13%
WPA Intelligence (R) (Note: Poll commissioned by the Club for Growth PAC)	September 25–28, 2023	500 (LV)	± 4.4%	48%	42%	–	10%
WPA Intelligence (R)	September 5–8, 2023	500 (LV)	± 4.4%	47%	40%	–	12%
Garin-Hart-Yang (D)	August 30 – September 1, 2023	716 (LV)	± 3.6%	51%	42%	–	7%
Public Policy Polling (D)	August 9–10, 2023	737 (V)	–	49%	41%	–	10%
Public Opinion Strategies (R) (Note: Poll commissioned by the Republican State Leadership Committee)	July 19–20, 2023	500 (LV)	± 4.4%	49%	45%	–	5%
Garin-Hart-Yang (D)	Late July 2023	716 (LV)	± 3.6%	48%	45%	–	7%
Public Opinion Strategies (R) (Note: Poll commissioned by the Prichard Committee for Academic Excellence)	June 22–29, 2023	800 (RV)	± 3.95%	52%	42%	–	0%
Cygnal (R)	May 22–23, 2023	600 (LV)	± 3.9%	47%	47%	–	6%
co/efficient (R)	May 18–19, 2023	987 (LV)	± 3.1%	45%	43%	–	12%
Mason-Dixon	January 18–23, 2023	625 (RV)	± 4.0%	49%	40%	–	11%

Hypothetical polling

Andy Beshear vs. Kelly Craft

Poll source	Date(s) administered	Sample size	Margin of error	Andy Beshear (D)	Kelly Craft (R)	Undecided
Mason-Dixon	January 18–23, 2023	625 (RV)	± 4.0%	57%	32%	11%

Andy Beshear vs. Mike Harmon

Poll source	Date(s) administered	Sample size	Margin of error	Andy Beshear (D)	Mike Harmon (R)	Undecided
Mason-Dixon	January 18–23, 2023	625 (RV)	± 4.0%	53%	33%	14%

Andy Beshear vs. Ryan Quarles

Poll source	Date(s) administered	Sample size	Margin of error	Andy Beshear (D)	Ryan Quarles (R)	Undecided
Mason-Dixon	January 18–23, 2023	625 (RV)	± 4.0%	52%	35%	13%

=== Results ===
Beshear won re-election by a 5% margin. Key to his victory was his performance in the state's two most populous counties, Jefferson and Fayette (home to the cities of Louisville and Lexington, respectively), each of which he carried with more than 70% of the vote. Beshear also over-performed in several Republican-leaning suburban counties in Northern Kentucky and the Bluegrass region, and in several historically Democratic rural counties in the Eastern Coalfield which have swung sharply towards the Republican Party in the 21st century. Beshear's gains in the Eastern Coalfield were attributed to his response to flooding in the region in 2022.

2023 Kentucky gubernatorial election
Party	Candidate	Votes	%	±%
Democratic	Andy Beshear (incumbent); Jacqueline Coleman (incumbent)	694,482	52.53	+3.34
Republican	Daniel Cameron; Robert M. "Robby" Mills	627,457	47.46	−1.37
Write-in	Brian Fishback; William Fishback	83	0.01	N/A
Total votes		1,322,022	100.0	N/A
Turnout		1,326,441	38.06	−6.16
Registered electors		3,484,827		
Democratic hold				

==== By county ====

County	Andy Beshear		Daniel Cameron		Write-in		Margin		Total votes
County	%	#	%	#	%	#	%	#	Total votes
Adair	31.94%	1,688	68.06%	3,597	0.00%	0	-36.12%	-1,909	5,285
Allen	29.60%	1,513	70.40%	3,599	0.00%	0	-40.81%	-2,086	5,112
Anderson	45.34%	4,212	54.66%	5,078	0.00%	0	-9.32%	-866	9,290
Ballard	36.28%	963	63.72%	1,691	0.00%	0	-27.43%	-728	2,654
Barren	41.78%	4,965	58.21%	6,918	0.01%	1	-16.43%	-1,953	11,884
Bath	55.81%	1,913	44.19%	1,515	0.00%	0	11.61%	398	3,428
Bell	40.24%	2,281	59.74%	3,386	0.02%	1	-19.50%	-1,105	5,668
Boone	43.96%	17,575	56.03%	22,399	0.01%	4	-12.07%	-4,824	39,978
Bourbon	53.96%	3,265	46.04%	2,786	0.00%	0	7.92%	479	6,051
Boyd	51.52%	6,068	48.48%	5,710	0.00%	0	3.04%	358	11,778
Boyle	52.89%	5,040	47.11%	4,489	0.00%	0	5.78%	551	9,529
Bracken	39.86%	939	60.14%	1,417	0.00%	0	-20.29%	-478	2,356
Breathitt	61.17%	1,763	38.83%	1,119	0.00%	0	22.35%	644	2,882
Breckinridge	41.96%	2,608	58.04%	3,607	0.00%	0	-16.07%	-999	6,215
Bullitt	42.96%	10,723	57.04%	14,235	0.00%	0	-14.07%	-3,512	24,958
Butler	32.15%	1,173	67.85%	2,475	0.00%	0	-35.69%	-1,302	3,648
Caldwell	39.99%	1,519	60.01%	2,279	0.00%	0	-20.01%	-760	3,798
Calloway	46.26%	5,211	53.74%	6,054	0.00%	0	-7.48%	-843	11,265
Campbell	54.19%	16,885	45.80%	14,271	0.01%	4	8.39%	2,614	31,160
Carlisle	30.33%	545	69.67%	1,252	0.00%	0	-39.34%	-707	1,797
Carroll	47.95%	1,112	52.05%	1,207	0.00%	0	-4.10%	-95	2,319
Carter	47.27%	2,978	52.71%	3,321	0.02%	1	-5.44%	-343	6,300
Casey	26.08%	1,129	73.92%	3,200	0.00%	0	-47.84%	-2,071	4,329
Christian	42.68%	5,135	57.30%	6,893	0.02%	2	-14.61%	-1,758	12,030
Clark	51.63%	5,938	48.35%	5,561	0.03%	3	3.28%	377	11,502
Clay	35.63%	1,441	64.37%	2,603	0.00%	0	-28.73%	-1,162	4,044
Clinton	24.33%	607	75.67%	1,888	0.00%	0	-51.34%	-1,281	2,495
Crittenden	34.07%	858	65.93%	1,660	0.00%	0	-31.85%	-802	2,518
Cumberland	26.43%	503	73.57%	1,400	0.00%	0	-47.14%	-897	1,903
Daviess	51.11%	15,572	48.89%	14,895	0.01%	2	2.22%	677	30,469
Edmonson	37.38%	1,358	62.54%	2,272	0.08%	3	-25.16%	-914	3,633
Elliott	53.48%	875	46.52%	761	0.00%	0	6.97%	114	1,636
Estill	42.17%	1,509	57.83%	2,069	0.00%	0	-15.65%	-560	3,578
Fayette	71.75%	74,298	28.24%	29,239	0.01%	8	43.52%	45,059	103,545
Fleming	42.13%	1,865	57.87%	2,562	0.00%	0	-15.74%	-697	4,427
Floyd	57.14%	5,136	42.85%	3,852	0.01%	1	14.28%	1,284	8,989
Franklin	68.52%	13,500	31.48%	6,201	0.00%	0	37.05%	7,299	19,701
Fulton	44.89%	615	55.11%	755	0.00%	0	-10.22%	-140	1,370
Gallatin	40.71%	865	59.29%	1,260	0.00%	0	-18.59%	-395	2,125
Garrard	37.69%	2,141	62.31%	3,539	0.00%	0	-24.61%	-1,398	5,680
Grant	35.16%	2,220	64.82%	4,093	0.02%	1	-29.66%	-1,873	6,314
Graves	36.49%	3,885	63.51%	6,763	0.00%	0	-27.03%	-2,878	10,648
Grayson	36.07%	2,514	63.91%	4,454	0.01%	1	-27.84%	-1,940	6,969
Green	29.63%	1,082	70.35%	2,569	0.03%	1	-40.72%	-1,487	3,652
Greenup	45.74%	4,498	54.26%	5,336	0.00%	0	-8.52%	-838	9,834
Hancock	49.41%	1,464	50.59%	1,499	0.00%	0	-1.18%	-35	2,963
Hardin	49.70%	14,336	50.30%	14,511	0.00%	0	-0.61%	-175	28,847
Harlan	33.96%	1,904	66.04%	3,702	0.00%	0	-32.07%	-1,798	5,606
Harrison	49.09%	2,775	50.91%	2,878	0.00%	0	-1.82%	-103	5,653
Hart	38.62%	1,920	61.38%	3,051	0.00%	0	-22.75%	-1,131	4,971
Henderson	55.77%	7,048	44.22%	5,589	0.01%	1	11.54%	1,459	12,638
Henry	44.97%	2,325	55.01%	2,844	0.02%	1	-10.04%	-519	5,170
Hickman	33.03%	470	66.97%	953	0.00%	0	-33.94%	-483	1,423
Hopkins	45.50%	5,762	54.50%	6,901	0.00%	0	-8.99%	-1,139	12,663
Jackson	22.91%	743	77.06%	2,499	0.03%	1	-54.15%	-1,756	3,243
Jefferson	70.04%	179,854	29.95%	76,908	0.00%	11	40.09%	102,946	256,773
Jessamine	46.79%	8,007	53.20%	9,104	0.01%	1	-6.41%	-1,097	17,112
Johnson	37.08%	1,898	62.92%	3,220	0.00%	0	-25.83%	-1,322	5,118
Kenton	52.80%	26,066	47.20%	23,301	0.01%	4	5.60%	2,765	49,371
Knott	54.45%	1,847	45.55%	1,545	0.00%	0	8.90%	302	3,392
Knox	34.54%	2,286	65.46%	4,333	0.00%	0	-30.93%	-2,047	6,619
Larue	38.57%	1,756	61.41%	2,796	0.02%	1	-22.84%	-1,040	4,553
Laurel	31.41%	4,974	68.59%	10,862	0.01%	1	-37.18%	-5,888	15,837
Lawrence	37.31%	1,361	62.69%	2,287	0.00%	0	-25.38%	-926	3,648
Lee	46.32%	705	53.68%	817	0.00%	0	-7.36%	-112	1,522
Leslie	30.36%	667	69.64%	1,530	0.00%	0	-39.28%	-863	2,197
Letcher	52.33%	2,205	47.67%	2,009	0.00%	0	4.65%	196	4,214
Lewis	31.64%	911	68.36%	1,968	0.00%	0	-36.71%	-1,057	2,879
Lincoln	37.82%	2,586	62.18%	4,252	0.00%	0	-24.36%	-1,666	6,838
Livingston	36.62%	1,061	63.38%	1,836	0.00%	0	-26.75%	-775	2,897
Logan	37.35%	2,449	62.60%	4,105	0.05%	3	-25.26%	-1,656	6,557
Lyon	42.99%	1,221	57.01%	1,619	0.00%	0	-14.01%	-398	2,840
Madison	51.72%	14,012	48.28%	13,080	0.00%	1	3.44%	932	27,093
Magoffin	50.38%	1,577	49.62%	1,553	0.00%	0	0.77%	24	3,130
Marion	52.14%	2,891	47.84%	2,653	0.02%	1	4.29%	238	5,545
Marshall	39.94%	4,610	60.05%	6,932	0.01%	1	-20.12%	-2,322	11,543
Martin	29.81%	513	70.19%	1,208	0.00%	0	-40.38%	-695	1,721
Mason	46.68%	2,247	53.30%	2,566	0.02%	1	-6.63%	-319	4,814
McCracken	47.06%	9,867	52.94%	11,099	0.00%	0	-5.88%	-1,232	20,966
McCreary	28.21%	853	71.76%	2,170	0.03%	1	-43.55%	-1,317	3,024
McLean	41.59%	1,238	58.41%	1,739	0.00%	0	-16.83%	-501	2,977
Meade	43.13%	3,599	56.83%	4,742	0.04%	3	-13.70%	-1,143	8,344
Menifee	45.88%	862	54.07%	1,016	0.05%	1	-8.20%	-154	1,879
Mercer	44.26%	3,399	55.72%	4,279	0.01%	1	-11.46%	-880	7,679
Metcalfe	40.99%	1,242	59.01%	1,788	0.00%	0	-18.02%	-546	3,030
Monroe	25.27%	1,023	74.73%	3,025	0.00%	0	-49.46%	-2,002	4,048
Montgomery	49.31%	3,962	50.69%	4,073	0.00%	0	-1.38%	-111	8,035
Morgan	47.18%	1,630	52.79%	1,824	0.03%	1	-5.62%	-194	3,455
Muhlenberg	46.45%	3,833	53.55%	4,419	0.00%	0	-7.10%	-586	8,252
Nelson	50.63%	7,562	49.37%	7,375	0.00%	0	1.25%	187	14,937
Nicholas	56.01%	1,142	43.99%	897	0.00%	0	12.02%	245	2,039
Ohio	39.24%	2,479	60.76%	3,839	0.00%	0	-21.53%	-1,360	6,318
Oldham	49.57%	12,952	50.43%	13,177	0.00%	1	-0.86%	-225	26,130
Owen	40.55%	1,494	59.45%	2,190	0.00%	0	-18.89%	-696	3,684
Owsley	40.84%	381	59.16%	552	0.00%	0	-18.33%	-171	933
Pendleton	38.20%	1,511	61.80%	2,444	0.00%	0	-23.59%	-933	3,955
Perry	55.79%	3,121	44.21%	2,473	0.00%	0	11.58%	648	5,594
Pike	45.46%	5,797	54.54%	6,954	0.00%	0	-9.07%	-1,157	12,751
Powell	50.02%	1,518	49.98%	1,517	0.00%	0	0.03%	1	3,035
Pulaski	32.15%	6,139	67.85%	12,957	0.01%	1	-35.70%	-6,818	19,097
Robertson	44.17%	307	55.83%	388	0.00%	0	-11.65%	-81	695
Rockcastle	29.11%	1,244	70.89%	3,029	0.00%	0	-41.77%	-1,785	4,273
Rowan	60.75%	3,907	39.25%	2,524	0.00%	0	21.51%	1,383	6,431
Russell	30.03%	1,604	69.97%	3,737	0.00%	0	-39.94%	-2,133	5,341
Scott	54.58%	10,575	45.42%	8,801	0.01%	1	9.16%	1,774	19,377
Shelby	47.58%	7,946	52.40%	8,751	0.02%	4	-4.82%	-805	16,701
Simpson	41.21%	1,905	58.79%	2,718	0.00%	0	-17.59%	-813	4,623
Spencer	37.04%	2,752	62.96%	4,677	0.00%	0	-25.91%	-1,925	7,429
Taylor	40.80%	3,198	59.20%	4,641	0.00%	0	-18.41%	-1,443	7,839
Todd	34.07%	907	65.85%	1,753	0.08%	2	-31.78%	-846	2,662
Trigg	37.16%	1,532	62.84%	2,591	0.00%	0	-25.69%	-1,059	4,123
Trimble	44.09%	1,108	55.91%	1,405	0.00%	0	-11.82%	-297	2,513
Union	44.97%	1,722	55.03%	2,107	0.00%	0	-10.05%	-385	3,829
Warren	52.12%	18,165	47.87%	16,685	0.01%	5	4.25%	1,480	34,855
Washington	43.02%	1,772	56.96%	2,346	0.02%	1	-13.94%	-574	4,119
Wayne	37.81%	1,754	62.19%	2,885	0.00%	0	-24.38%	-1,131	4,639
Webster	41.32%	1,425	58.68%	2,024	0.00%	0	-17.37%	-599	3,449
Whitley	32.74%	2,697	67.26%	5,540	0.00%	0	-34.51%	-2,843	8,237
Wolfe	57.26%	1,010	42.74%	754	0.00%	0	14.51%	256	1,764
Woodford	59.25%	6,414	40.75%	4,411	0.00%	0	18.50%	2,003	10,825

Counties that flipped from Republican to Democratic

- Bourbon (largest city: Paris)
- Boyle (largest city: Danville)
- Clark (largest city: Winchester)
- Daviess (largest city: Owensboro)
- Letcher (largest city: Jenkins)
- Nelson (largest city: Bardstown)
- Perry (largest city: Hazard)
- Powell (largest city: Stanton)

Counties that flipped from Democratic to Republican

- Carter (largest city: Grayson)
- Hancock (largest city: Hawesville)

==== By congressional district ====
Despite winning the election, Beshear won only two of the state's six congressional districts, including one represented by a Republican.

District	Beshear	Cameron	Representative
1st	44%	56%	James Comer
2nd	46%	54%	Brett Guthrie
3rd	71%	29%	Morgan McGarvey
4th	48%	52%	Thomas Massie
5th	42%	58%	Hal Rogers
6th	60%	40%	Andy Barr

== See also ==
- 2023 Kentucky elections
- 2023 United States elections

== Notes ==
Partisan clients
