= Eddie Girdler =

American politician

Mayor of Somerset, Kentucky
- In office 2007–2019
- Preceded by: JP Wiles
- Succeeded by: Alan Keck

Personal details
- Born: June 24, 1950 (age 75) Eubank, Kentucky
- Party: Republican
- Website: Mayor's Office

Edward Ray Girdler is an American politician and former mayor of Somerset, Kentucky. He was unseated by the mayor Alan Keck in 2018.

== Impeachment threat ==
On November 13, 2007, City Councilman Jim Mitchell moved to impeach mayor Girdler. The situation began when City Attorney Carrie Wiese presented a resolution drafted by councilor Jim Rutherford asking for a state auditor to examine the City of Somerset's budget from January 1, 2007, to present.

== 2010 re-election bid ==
Girdler announced that he would run for re-election in 2010. He faced three opponents on the May 18 primary: Former mayor and current campaign treasurer for Congressman Hal Rogers, J.P Wiles; local business owner Bill Hamilton; and former Somerset police chief and current chief deputy at the Pulaski County Sheriff's Department, Larry Wesley. Girdler defeated Wiles by 89 votes.

== Interstate 66 ==
Girdler was critical of the proposed Interstate 66 bypass around the City of Somerset, concerned with the loss of business to the city. He instructed all city departments "not to encourage growth along I-66 and bypass intersections to the detriment of businesses along U.S. 27." The proposed route of the bypass is approximately five miles North of the main shopping area within the city limits of Somerset.

== 2018 Accident ==
On August 12, 2018, Mayor Girdler was accused of leaving the scene after an accident involving a 15-year-old cyclist. Mr. Girdler denied any wrongdoing, saying was not aware of any accident, but the cyclist was later air-lifted to the University of Kentucky hospital after suffering a laceration to her liver.
