= 2027 Kentucky Attorney General election =

- November 2, 2027
Incumbent Attorney General
Russell Coleman
Republican

The 2027 Kentucky Attorney General election will be held on November 2, 2027, to elect the attorney general of Kentucky. Republican incumbent Russell Coleman is running for reelection to a second term.

== Republican primary ==
=== Candidates ===
==== Declared ====
- Russell Coleman, incumbent attorney general
