= Jagged Island (South Shetland Islands) =

- Location within Antarctica

Geography
- Location: Antarctica
- Coordinates: 61°54′S 58°29′W

Administration
- Administered under the Antarctic Treaty System

Demographics
- Population: Uninhabited

Jagged Island is a rocky island 5 kilometres (2.5 nmi) north-northwest of Round Point, King George Island, in the South Shetland Islands. Presumably known to early sealers in the area, it was charted by Discovery Investigations personnel on the Discovery II in 1935 and given this descriptive name.

== See also ==
- List of antarctic and sub-antarctic islands
