= Jacqueline Coleman =

American educator and politician (born 1982)

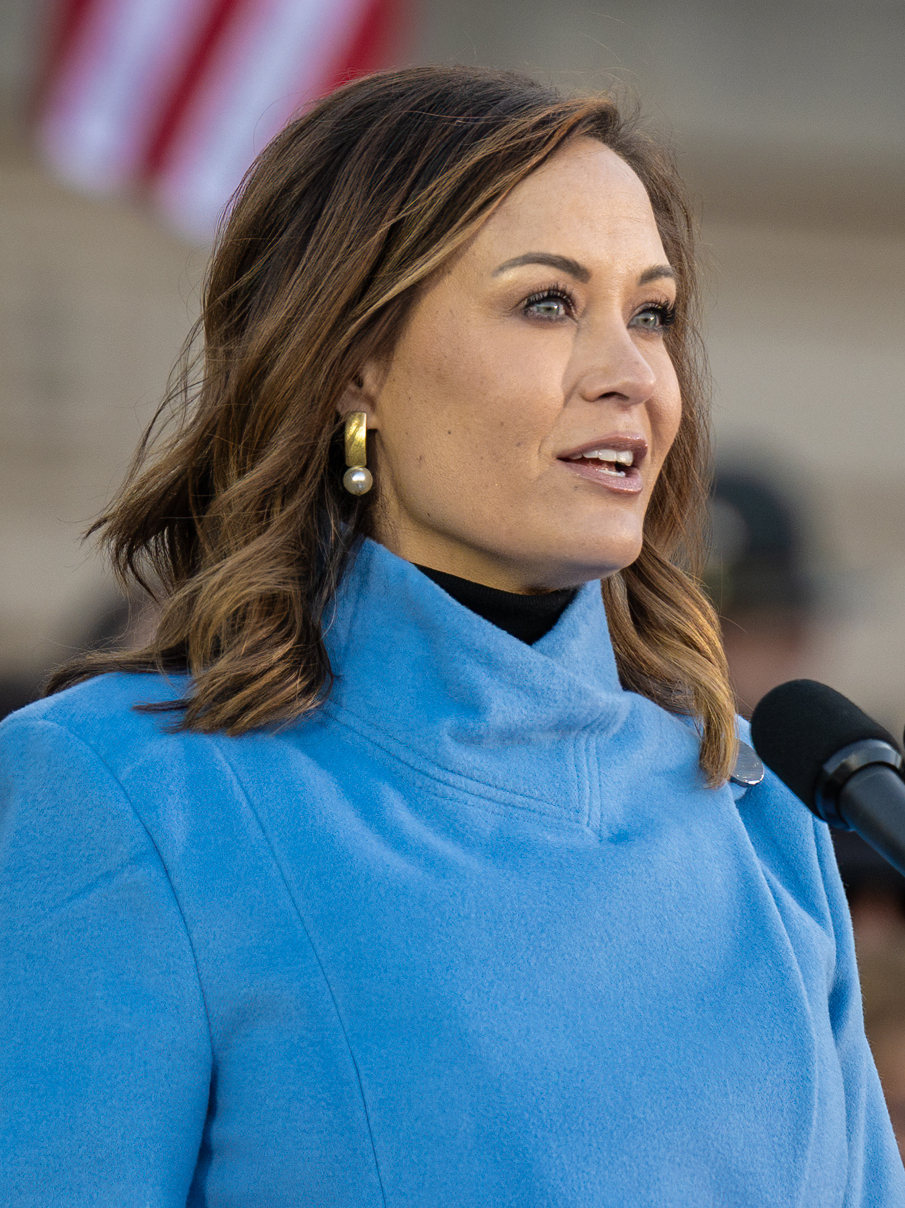
- Coleman in 2023

58th Lieutenant Governor of Kentucky
- Incumbent
- Assumed office December 10, 2019
- Governor: Andy Beshear
- Preceded by: Jenean Hampton

Secretary of the Kentucky Education and Workforce Development Cabinet
- In office December 10, 2019 – October 21, 2021
- Governor: Andy Beshear
- Preceded by: Derrick Ramsey
- Succeeded by: Mary Pat Regan (acting)

Personal details
- Born: Jacqueline Layne Coleman; June 9, 1982 (age 44) Danville, Kentucky, U.S.
- Party: Democratic
- Spouse: Chris O'Bryan (m. 2011)
- Children: 4
- Relatives: Jack Coleman (father); Jack Coleman (grandfather)
- Education: Centre College (BA); University of Louisville (MA); University of Kentucky (attended)

Jacqueline Layne Coleman (born June 9, 1982) is an American educator and politician serving as the 58th lieutenant governor of Kentucky since 2019. She has worked as a high school administrator, teacher, and basketball coach. A member of the Democratic Party, Coleman founded Lead Kentucky, a nonprofit organization focused on education policy reform.

In the 2019 gubernatorial election, Democratic nominee Andy Beshear selected Coleman as his running mate for lieutenant governor—they defeated Republican incumbent Matt Bevin and his running mate Ralph Alvarado in the November general election. Beshear and Coleman were re-elected in 2023.

In April 2026, Coleman announced her candidacy for governor in the 2027 election to succeed Beshear who is term-limited.

== Early life and career ==
Coleman attended Mercer County High School in Harrodsburg, Kentucky, where she played basketball. She enrolled at Centre College in 2001 to study history, earned a bachelor's degree in 2004, and played college basketball for the Centre Colonels as a 5-foot-6-inch (168 cm) shooting guard. As a senior at Centre in 2003–04, Coleman averaged 26.4 minutes, 7.4 points, 2.7 rebounds, and 1.3 assists, with 14 starts in 25 games. She earned a master's degree in political science at the University of Louisville in 2008, and was a graduate assistant on the Louisville Cardinals women's basketball team in 2005–06 under head coach Tom Collen.

After graduating, Coleman became a social studies teacher at Burgin High School in Burgin, Kentucky, and coached the girls' basketball team. From 2008 through 2015, she coached and taught advanced government at East Jessamine High School in Nicholasville, Kentucky.

Coleman ran in the 2014 Kentucky House of Representatives election to represent the 55th district as a member of the Democratic Party. She lost the election to incumbent Republican Kim King by over 30% in a Republican-dominated district.

In 2013, Coleman founded Lead Kentucky, a nonprofit organization focused on education policy reform. Inspired by Emerge Kentucky, the mission statement reads: "Lead Kentucky is a non-profit organization that recruits the best and brightest college women in the Bluegrass and empowers them to become the Commonwealth's next generation of leaders." By focusing on leadership development of college aged women through emphasis on networking, finding a work/life balance, and overcoming obstacles (specifically in Kentucky), Coleman hopes that this program will empower women to take on roles that they may otherwise avoid.

She became assistant principal at Nelson County High School in Bardstown, Kentucky in 2017, a position she held until her resignation in November 2019, following her election as lieutenant governor. Coleman is a doctoral student at the University of Kentucky, where she is studying educational leadership.

== Political career ==
=== Lieutenant Governor of Kentucky ===
==== Elections ====
Andy Beshear selected Coleman as his running mate on the Democratic ticket in the 2019 Kentucky gubernatorial election. On November 5, 2019, Beshear was declared the winner of the election, making Coleman the lieutenant governor-elect. After the election, Coleman said she would focus on education and rural economic development as lieutenant governor.

Coleman was again Beshear's running mate in the 2023 Kentucky gubernatorial election. Beshear and Coleman were re-elected on November 7, 2023.

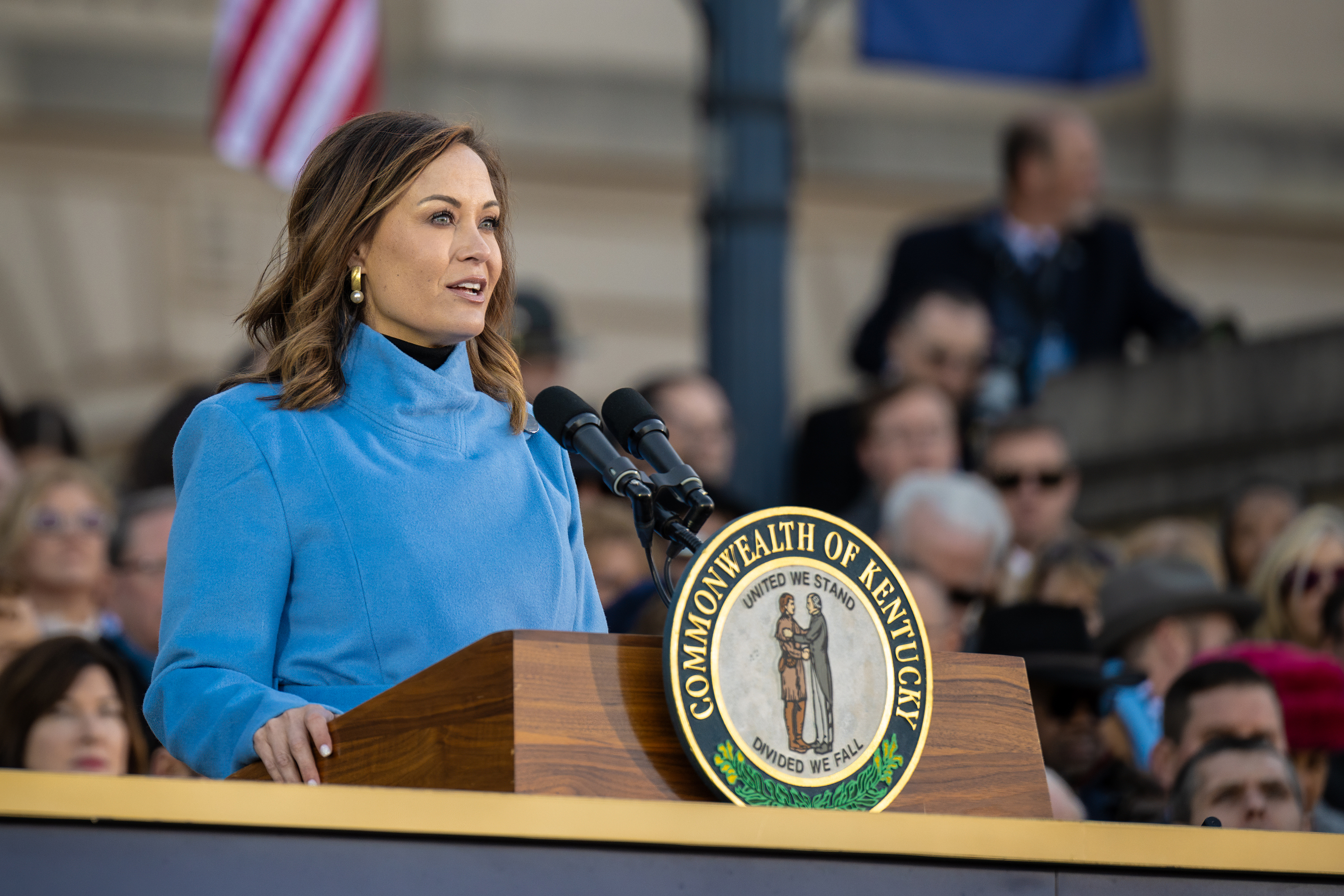
Coleman delivers speech at second Inauguration in December 2023

==== Tenure ====
Coleman and Beshear were sworn into office on December 10. In addition to serving as lieutenant governor, Beshear tapped Coleman to be the Secretary of Education and Workforce Development in his cabinet; however, she stepped down from this position in October 2021, saying that "seeing these commitments through requires a laser-like focus".

=== 2027 gubernatorial election ===
On April 20, 2026, Coleman announced her intent to run for governor in 2027. She will face former senior advisor to the governor Rocky Adkins in the Democratic primary.

== Personal life ==
Coleman's grandfather, Jack Coleman, played in the National Basketball Association. Her father, also named Jack, served in the Kentucky House, representing the 55th district from 1991 through 2004.

Coleman and her husband, Christopher O'Bryan, announced her pregnancy during the 2019 campaign. Their daughter was born on February 8, 2020, making Coleman the highest-ranking elected executive official and first lieutenant governor in Kentucky history to give birth while in office. Coleman also has another daughter, a former student she coached, whom she and O'Bryan adopted in December 2019, and is the stepmother to O'Bryan's two sons from a previous relationship. On December 18, 2023, Coleman had a double mastectomy due to her family's history of cancer.

== See also ==
- List of female lieutenant governors in the United States

== Notes ==
Party political offices
Preceded by Sannie Overly	Democratic nominee for Lieutenant Governor of Kentucky; 2019, 2023	Most recent
Political offices
Preceded by Jenean Hampton	Lieutenant Governor of Kentucky; 2019–present	Incumbent
