= Jagged Island (Graham Land) =

Island in Antarctica

- Location within Antarctica

Geography
- Location: Antarctica
- Coordinates: 65°58′S 65°41′W

Administration
- Administered under the Antarctic Treaty System

Demographics
- Population: Uninhabited

Jagged Island is an island 4 kilometres (2 nmi) long, lying 2 kilometres (1 nmi) east of Dodman Island and 15 kilometres (8 nmi) west of Ferin Head, off the west coast of Graham Land, Antarctica. It was probably first sighted in January 1909 by the French Antarctic Expedition under Jean-Baptiste Charcot, and was charted and named by the British Graham Land Expedition, 1934–37, under John Rymill.

== See also ==
- List of Antarctic and sub-Antarctic islands
