= Mutton Cove, Biscoe Islands =

Cove in the Biscoe Islands in Antarctica

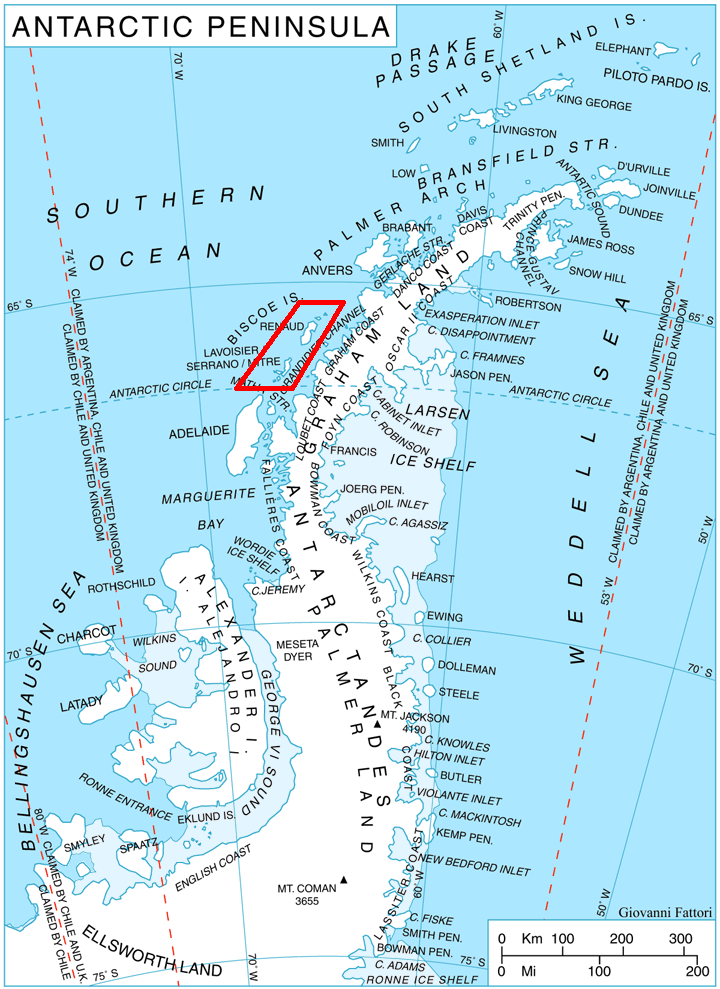
Location of Biscoe Islands in the Antarctic Peninsula region.

Mutton Cove (66°0′S 65°39′W) is an anchorage 0.9 km (0.56 mi) northeast of the south end of Beer Island in the Biscoe Islands, off the Antarctic Peninsula in Antarctica. The cove is formed by four small islands, Harp, Upper, Cliff and Girdler Islands. Beer Island shelters the cove from the west. Charted in 1936 by the British Graham Land Expedition (BGLE) under Rymill and, at the suggestion of Lieutenant R.G.D. Ryder, Royal Navy, captain of the days in a training ship at Devonport.
