= Prospect Point (Antarctica) =

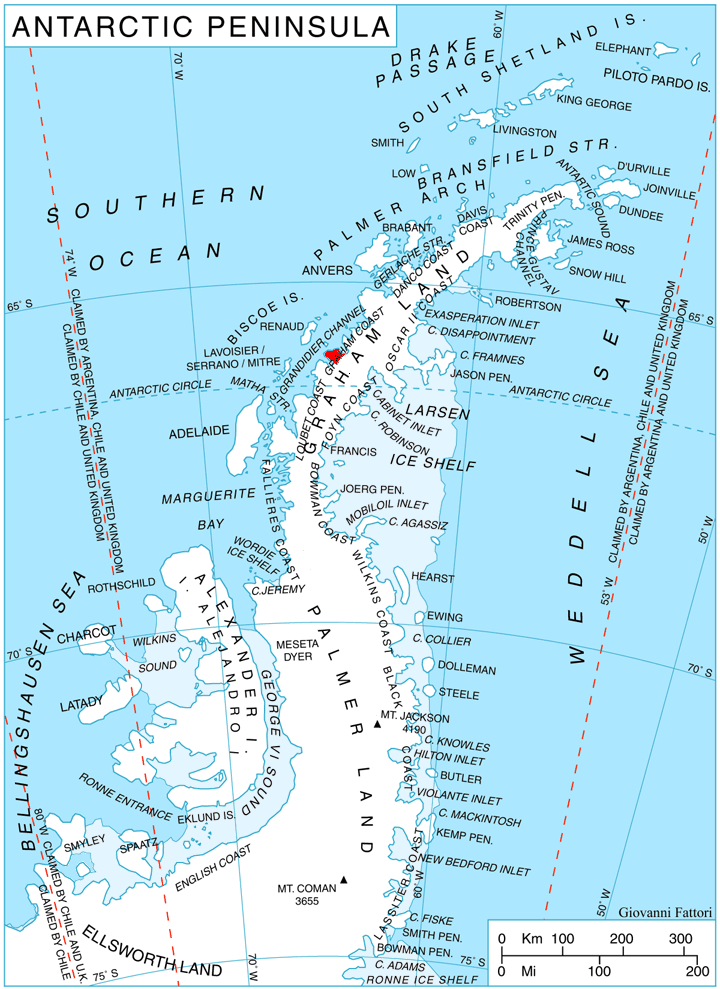
Location of Velingrad Peninsula on Graham Coast, Antarctic Peninsula.

Prospect Point is a headland at the west extremity of Velingrad Peninsula on Graham Coast in Graham Land, four kilometres (two nautical miles) south of Ferin Head and immediately east of the Fish Islands. Roughly charted by the British Graham Land Expedition (BGLE) under Rymill, 1934–37. Photographed by Hunting Aerosurveys Ltd. in 1956–57. The name was suggested in 1957 by E. P. Arrowsmith, Governor of the Falkland Islands.

== Station J ==
Station J
- Antarctic research station
- Interactive map of Station J
- Coordinates: 65°59′55″S 65°19′06″W
- Established: 2 February 1957
- Removed: 23 February 1959

Government
  - Type: Administration
  - Body: BAS, United Kingdom
- Active times: All year-round

Prospect Point was the location of the British research Station J. The hut, known as Penola, was occupied from February 2, 1957 to February 23, 1959 and the researchers carried out searching in the survey and geology. The station was removed in April 2004.

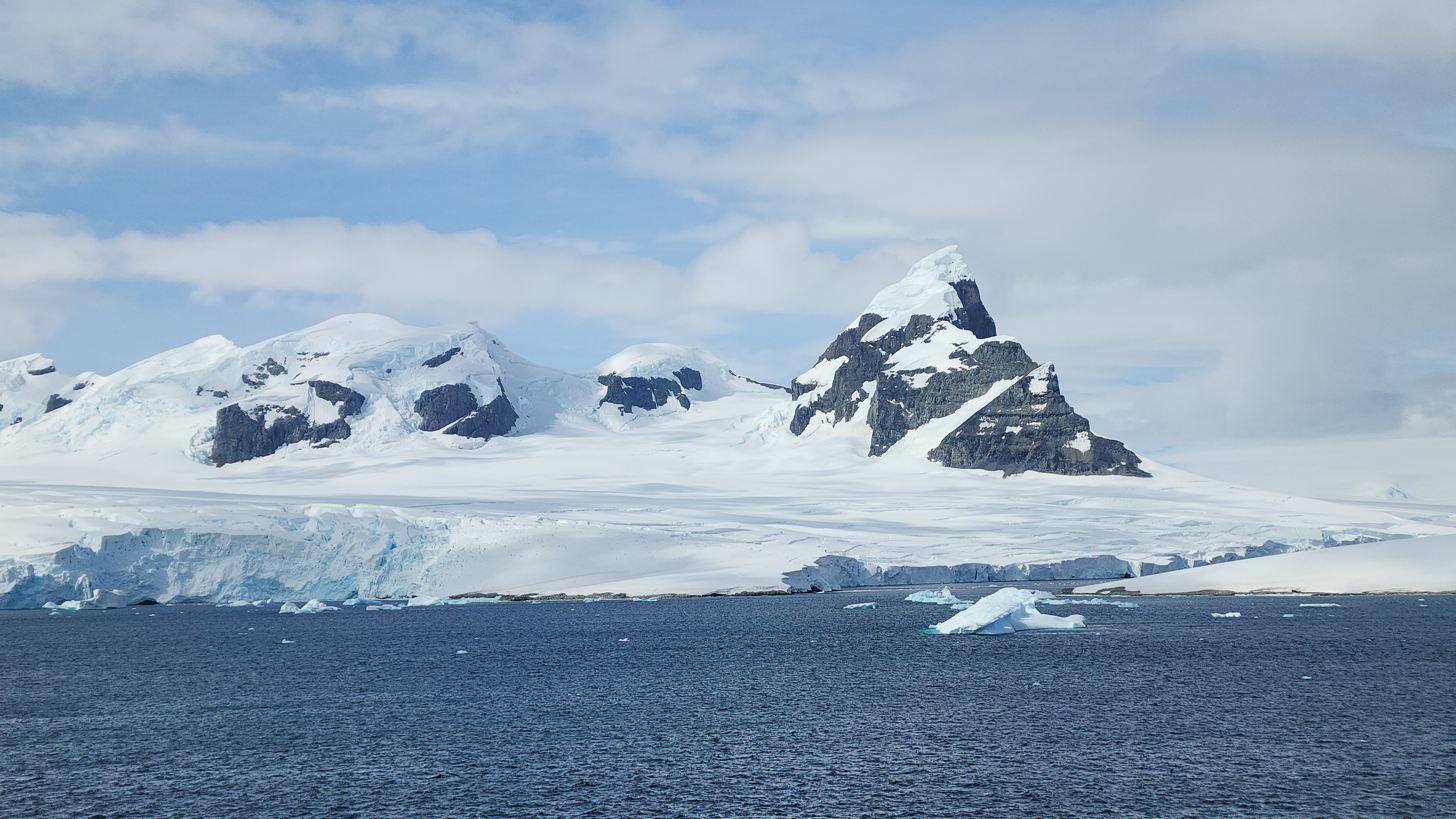
View over Prospect Point

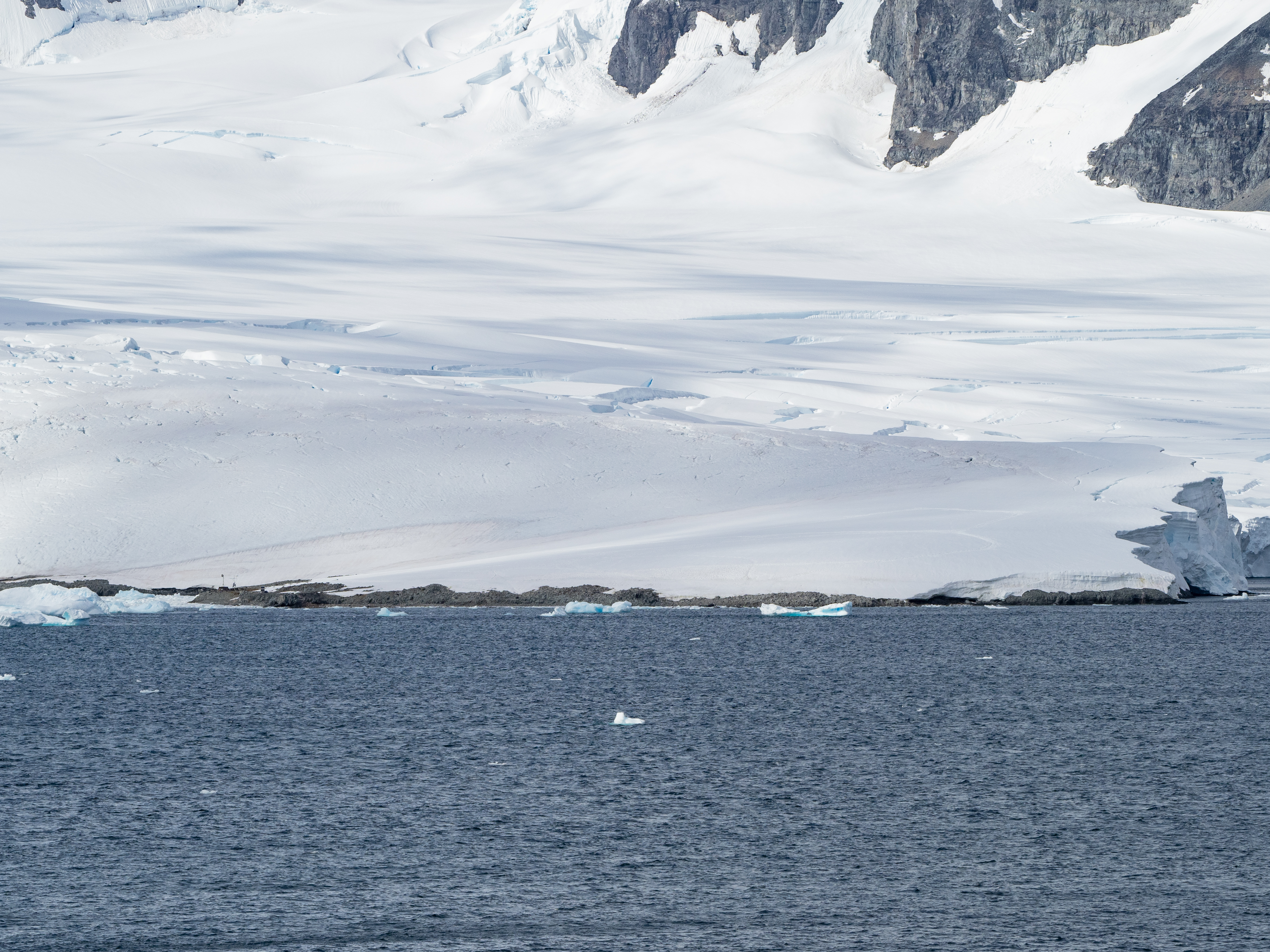
Prospect Point

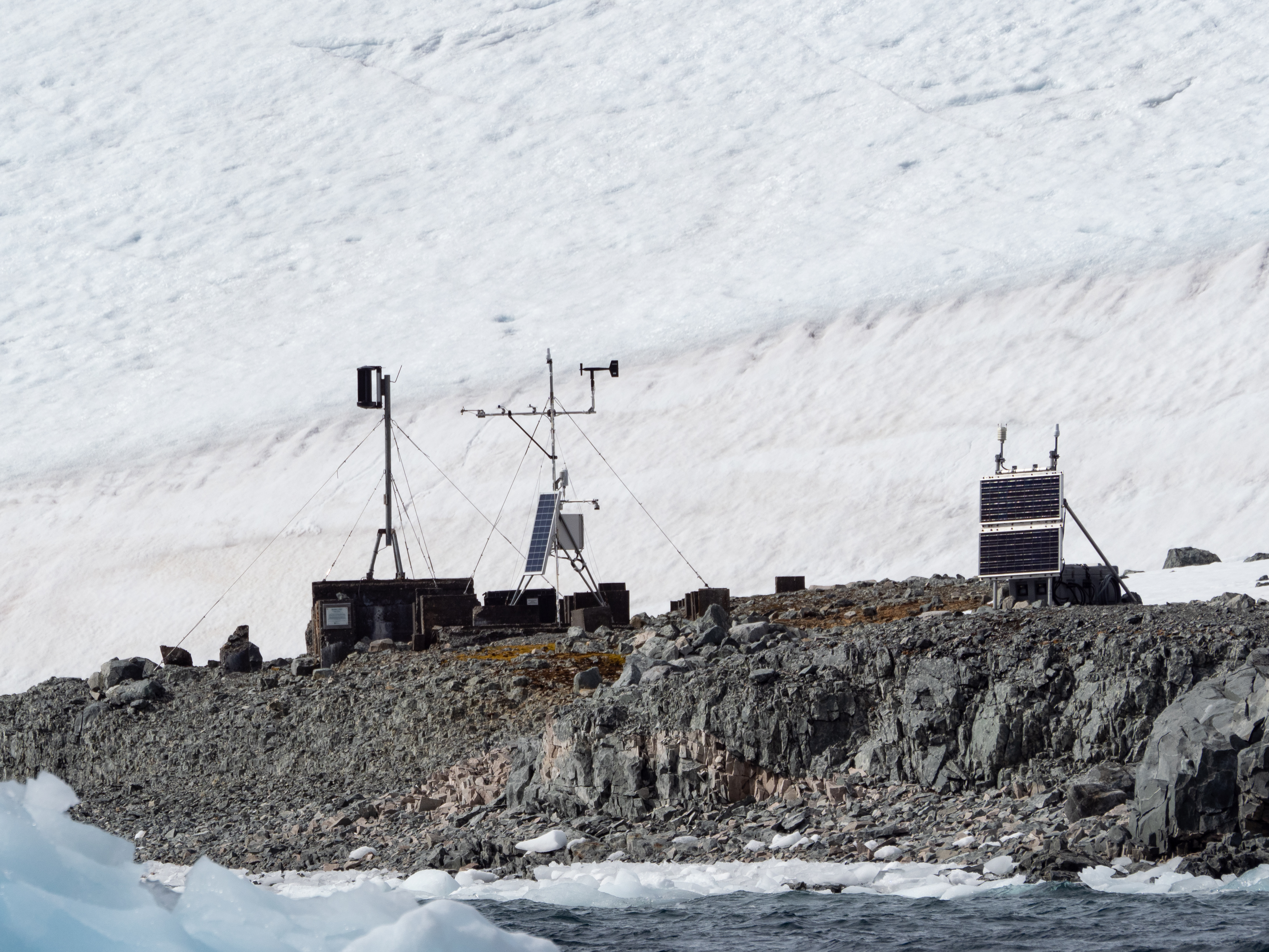
Foundations of "Station J" with modern monitoring equipment

== See also ==
- List of Antarctic and sub-Antarctic islands
- List of Antarctic research stations
- List of Antarctic field camps
