= 2006 United States House of Representatives elections in Kentucky =

- November 7, 2006

All 6 Kentucky seats to the United States House of Representatives
	Majority party	Minority party
Party	Republican	Democratic
Last election	5	1
Seats won	4	2
Seat change	▼1	▲1
Popular vote	611,780	601,723
Percentage	48.80%	48.00%
Swing	▼13.42%	▲11.18%

Republican
50–60%
60–70%
70–80%
80–90%
Democratic
40–50%
50–60%
60–70%
70–80%
80–90%

The 2006 House elections in Kentucky occurred on November 7, 2006, to elect the members of the State of Kentucky's delegation to the United States House of Representatives. Kentucky had six seats in the House, apportioned according to the 2000 United States census.

These elections occurred simultaneously with the United States Senate elections of 2006, the United States House elections in other states, and various state and local elections.

== Overview ==
United States House of Representatives elections in Kentucky, 2006
Party	Votes	Percentage	Seats	+/–
Republican	611,780	48.80%	4	-1
Democratic	601,723	48.00%	2	+1
Libertarian	39,249	3.13%	0	-
Constitution	774	0.06%	0	-
Totals	1,253,526	100.00%	6	—

== District 1 ==
2006 Kentucky's 1st congressional district election
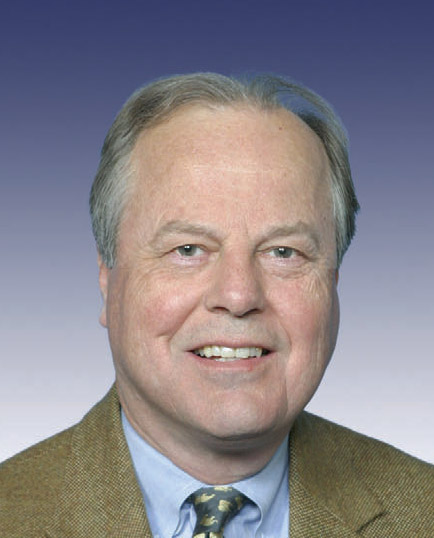

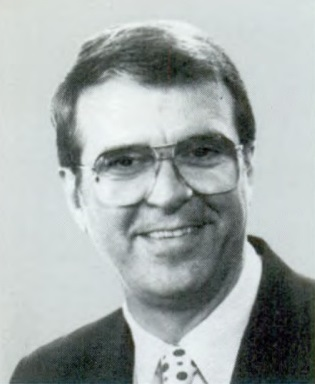
Nominee	Ed Whitfield	Tom Barlow
Party	Republican	Democratic
Popular vote	123,618	83,865
Percentage	59.58%	40.42%
- County results Whitfield: 50–60% 60–70% 70–80% Barlow: 50–60%
U.S. Representative before election
Ed Whitfield
Republican
Elected U.S. Representative
Ed Whitfield
Republican

Incumbent Republican Congressman Ed Whitfield faced off against former Congressman Thomas Barlow, the Democratic nominee, winning by a solid margin, but less than he is used to in this west Kentucky-based district.

=== Predictions ===
Source	Ranking	As of
The Cook Political Report	Safe R	November 6, 2006
Rothenberg	Safe R	November 6, 2006
Sabato's Crystal Ball	Safe R	November 6, 2006
Real Clear Politics	Safe R	November 7, 2006
CQ Politics	Safe R	November 7, 2006

Kentucky's 1st congressional district election, 2006)
Party	Candidate	Votes	%
Republican	Ed Whitfield (incumbent)	123,618	59.58
Democratic	Tom Barlow	83,865	40.42
Total votes		207,483	100.00
Republican hold			

== District 2 ==
2006 Kentucky's 2nd congressional district election
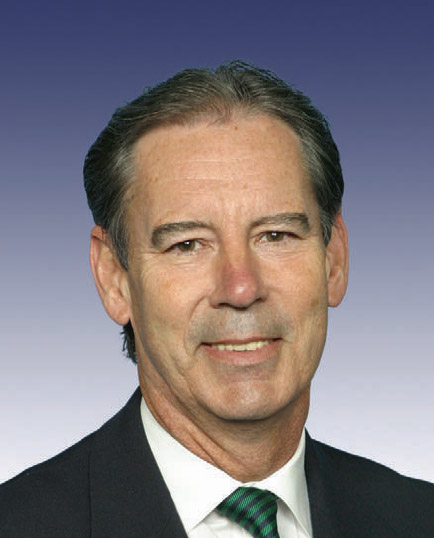

Nominee	Ron Lewis	Mike Weaver
Party	Republican	Democratic
Popular vote	118,548	95,415
Percentage	55.41%	44.59%
- County results Lewis: 50–60% 60–70% 70–80% Weaver: 50–60% 60–70%
U.S. Representative before election
Ron Lewis
Republican
Elected U.S. Representative
Ron Lewis
Republican

Incumbent Ron Lewis (R) was sought a sixth term in this conservative, west-central Kentucky district. Lewis has had no trouble winning reelection after succeeding longtime Democrat William Natcher. His special election victory turned out to be the first sign of the Republican wave later that year. But when first elected, he had promised to serve only six full terms. He was challenged by state Representative Mike Weaver, whose background in business and War Veteran of both Korea and Vietnam made it hard to portray him as a liberal. However, Weaver had trouble raising money. Ultimately, Weaver was unable to capitalize on the Democratic wave sweeping the country, and lost to Lewis.

=== Endorsements ===
Mike Weaver (D)

Individuals

- Wesley Clark, General, 2004 democratic presidential candidate

==== Predictions ====
Source	Ranking	As of
The Cook Political Report	Lean R	November 6, 2006
Rothenberg	Likely R	November 6, 2006
Sabato's Crystal Ball	Lean R	November 6, 2006
Real Clear Politics	Safe R	November 7, 2006
CQ Politics	Lean R	November 7, 2006

Kentucky's 2nd congressional district election, 2006
Party	Candidate	Votes	%
Republican	Ron Lewis (incumbent)	118,548	55.41%
Democratic	Mike Weaver	95,415	44.59%
Total votes		213,963	100.00
Republican hold			

== District 3 ==
2006 Kentucky's 3rd congressional district election
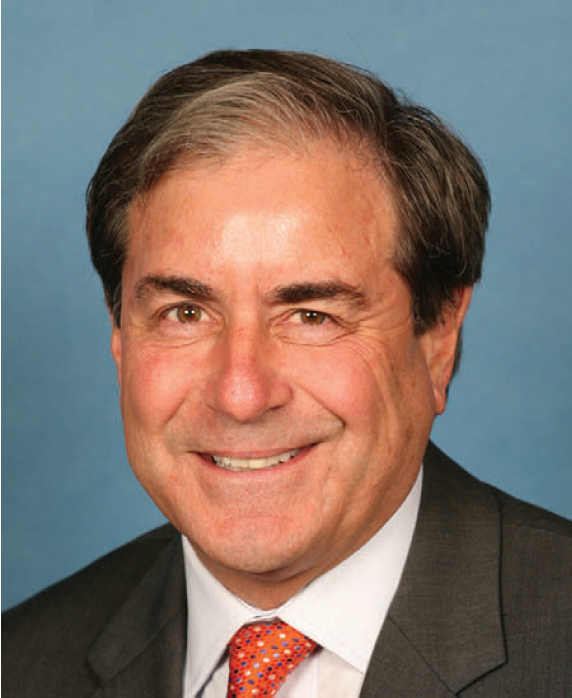

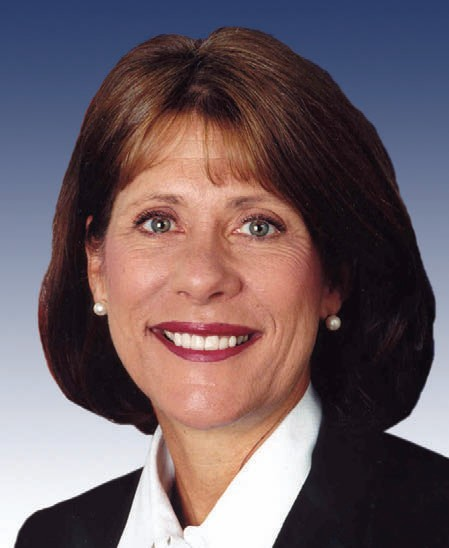
Nominee	John Yarmuth	Anne Northup
Party	Democratic	Republican
Popular vote	122,489	116,568
Percentage	50.62%	48.18%
- State House district results Yarmuth: 40–50% 50–60% 60–70% 70–80% Northup: 50–60% 60–70%
U.S. Representative before election
Anne Northup
Republican
Elected U.S. Representative
John Yarmuth
Democratic

Incumbent Anne Northup (R) had been a target for the Democrats since her election in 1996; in 2004 and 2000, John Kerry and Al Gore both won her Louisville-centered congressional district by two percent, and Bill Clinton won the district by double-digit margins during the 1990s. While Northup had generally run close races, she won 60% of the vote in the 2004 election. Redistricting after the 2000 census added a few more suburban Republicans to the district, according to Congressional Quarterly. The Democratic candidate was John Yarmuth, the founder of local free publication LEO. In spite of Northup's electoral success, excellent constituent services, and popularity among blue-collar voters in southern Louisville, Democrats saw this race as winnable, calling attention to Northup's 91% lockstep voting record with an unpopular President Bush. Northup led in most polls until October, when Yarmuth began to gain. By election night, the race had become highly competitive. House Majority Leader John Boehner referred to Northup as the Republicans' "canary in the coal mine", meaning that her fortunes would portend the outcome of House elections nationwide. This proved to be a correct assessment, as on election night, Yarmuth defeated Northup and Republicans lost control of the House. Yarmuth was re-elected in 2008 in a rematch with Northup.

=== Predictions ===
Source	Ranking	As of
The Cook Political Report	Tossup	November 6, 2006
Rothenberg	Tilt R	November 6, 2006
Sabato's Crystal Ball	Tilt R	November 6, 2006
Real Clear Politics	Tossup	November 7, 2006
CQ Politics	Lean R	November 7, 2006

Kentucky's 3rd congressional district election, 2006
Party	Candidate	Votes	%
Democratic	John Yarmuth	122,489	50.62
Republican	Anne Northup (incumbent)	116,568	48.18
Libertarian	Donna Walker Mancini	2,134	0.88
Constitution	W. Ed Parker	774	0.32
Total votes		241,965	100.00
Democratic gain from Republican			

== District 4 ==
2006 Kentucky's 4th congressional district election
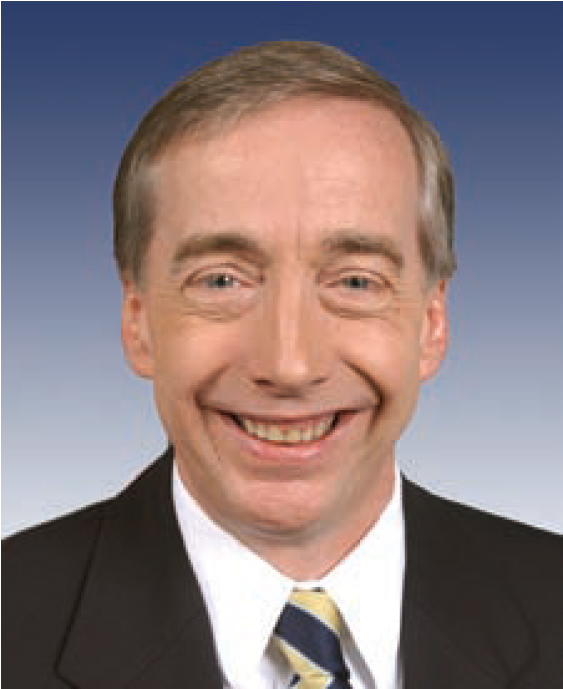

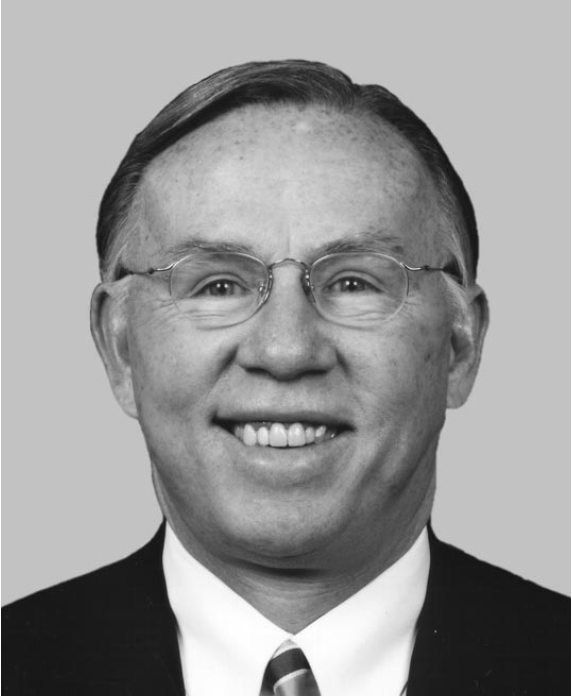
Nominee	Geoff Davis	Ken Lucas
Party	Republican	Democratic
Popular vote	105,845	88,822
Percentage	51.69%	43.38%
- County results Davis: 50–60% 60–70% Lucas: 40–50% 50–60% 60–70% 70–80%
U.S. Representative before election
Geoff Davis
Republican
Elected U.S. Representative
Geoff Davis
Republican

First-term incumbent Geoff Davis (R) was being challenged by retired U.S. Air Force Major Ken Lucas (D), who held the seat from 1999 to 2005. Lucas defeated Davis 51% to 48% in 2002, and retired in 2004, adhering to a pledge of serving only three consecutive terms in the House. Lucas was among the most conservative Democrats in Congress and remains well known in the district, which includes most of Kentucky's share of the Cincinnati metropolitan area. Brian Houillion (L) entered the race on June 19. In late July The Washington Post also rated the race as a toss-up. However, Davis is an aggressive campaigner who had spent much time in the district, which ultimately paid off, as Davis defeated Lucas by a surprisingly wide margin.

=== Predictions ===
Source	Ranking	As of
The Cook Political Report	Lean R	November 6, 2006
Rothenberg	Tilt R	November 6, 2006
Sabato's Crystal Ball	Tilt D (flip)	November 6, 2006
Real Clear Politics	Lean R	November 7, 2006
CQ Politics	Lean R	November 7, 2006

Kentucky's 4th congressional district election, 2006
Party	Candidate	Votes	%
Republican	Geoff Davis (incumbent)	105,845	51.69
Democratic	Ken Lucas	88,822	43.38
Libertarian	Brian Houillion	10,100	4.93
Total votes		204,767	100.00
Republican hold			

== District 5 ==
2006 Kentucky's 5th congressional district election
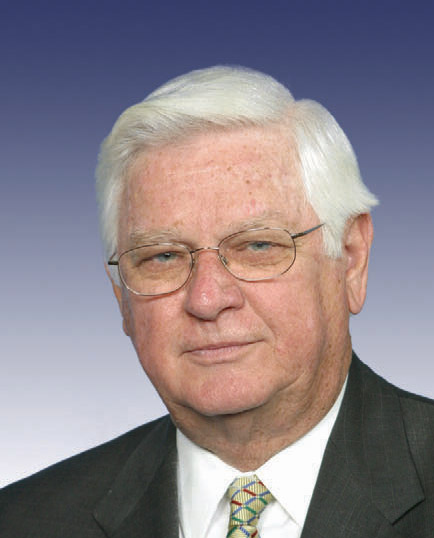

Nominee	Hal Rogers	Kenneth Stepp
Party	Republican	Democratic
Popular vote	147,201	52,367
Percentage	73.76%	26.24%
- County results Rogers: 50–60% 60–70% 70–80% 80–90% Stepp: 50–60%
U.S. Representative before election
Hal Rogers
Republican
Elected U.S. Representative
Hal Rogers
Republican

Incumbent Republican Congressman Hal Rogers faced off against Democratic nominee Kenneth Stepp, who was not a serious contender for the seat considering this east Kentucky district's strong conservative tendencies.

=== Predictions ===
Source	Ranking	As of
The Cook Political Report	Safe R	November 6, 2006
Rothenberg	Safe R	November 6, 2006
Sabato's Crystal Ball	Safe R	November 6, 2006
Real Clear Politics	Safe R	November 7, 2006
CQ Politics	Safe R	November 7, 2006

Kentucky's 5th congressional district election, 2006
Party	Candidate	Votes	%
Republican	Hal Rogers (incumbent)	147,201	73.76
Democratic	Kenneth Stepp	52,367	26.24
Total votes		199,568	100.00
Republican hold			

== District 6 ==
2006 Kentucky's 6th congressional district election
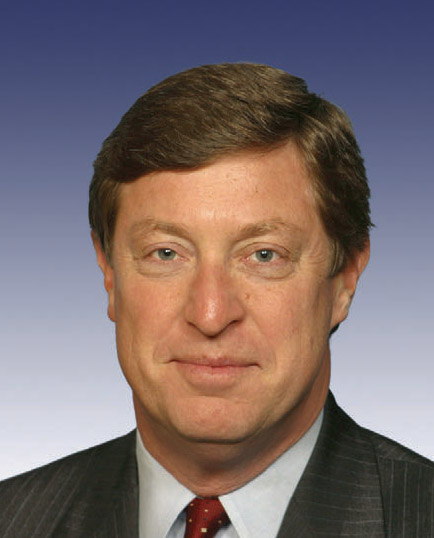

Nominee	Ben Chandler	Paul Ard
Party	Democratic	Libertarian
Popular vote	158,765	27,015
Percentage	85.46%	14.56%
- County results Chandler: 80–90%
U.S. Representative before election
Ben Chandler
Democratic
Elected U.S. Representative
Ben Chandler
Democratic

Opposed by only Libertarian candidate Paul Ard, incumbent Democratic Congressman Ben Chandler faced no serious obstacle in his bid for a third term.

=== Predictions ===
Source	Ranking	As of
The Cook Political Report	Safe D	November 6, 2006
Rothenberg	Safe D	November 6, 2006
Sabato's Crystal Ball	Safe D	November 6, 2006
Real Clear Politics	Safe D	November 7, 2006
CQ Politics	Safe D	November 7, 2006

Kentucky's 6th congressional district election, 2006
Party	Candidate	Votes	%
Democratic	Ben Chandler (incumbent)	158,765	85.46
Libertarian	Paul Ard	27,015	14.54
Total votes		185,780	100.00
Democratic hold			

Preceded by 2004 elections	United States House elections in Kentucky; 2006	Succeeded by 2008 elections
