= 2008 United States House of Representatives elections in Kentucky =

- November 4, 2008

All 6 Kentucky seats to the United States House of Representatives
	Majority party	Minority party
Party	Republican	Democratic
Last election	4	2
Seats won	4	2
Seat change	Steady	Steady
Popular vote	955,182	761,209
Percentage	54.59%	43.50%
Swing	▲5.79%	▼4.50%

Republican
50–60%
60–70%
70–80%
80–90%
90–100%
Democratic
50–60%
60–70%
70–80%

The 2008 congressional elections in Kentucky were held on November 4, 2008, to determine who would represent the state of Kentucky in the United States House of Representatives. Kentucky has six seats in the House, apportioned according to the 2000 United States census. Representatives are elected for two-year terms; those elected were to serve in the 111th Congress from January 4, 2009, until January 3, 2011. The election coincides with the 2008 U.S. presidential election.

The deadline to file to run in the election was January 29, 2008. The primary for both parties took place on May 20, 2008. The current delegation consists of 2 Democrats and 4 Republicans. With the exception of Ron Lewis, all incumbents ran for and won reelection.

== Overview ==
United States House of Representatives elections in Kentucky, 2008
Party	Votes	Percentage	Seats before	Seats after	+/–
Republican	955,182	54.59%	4	4	±0
Democratic	761,209	43.50%	2	2	±0
Independent	33,449	1.91%	0	0	0
Valid votes	-	-%			
Invalid or blank votes	-	-%			
Totals	1,749,840	100.00%	6	6	—
Voter turnout	60.133%				

=== Match-up summary ===
District	Incumbent	2008 status	Democratic	Republican	Other party
1	Ed Whitfield	Re-election	Heather A. Ryan	Ed Whitfield	
2	Ron Lewis	Open	David Boswell	Brett Guthrie	
3	John Yarmuth	Re-election	John Yarmuth	Anne Northup	
4	Geoff Davis	Re-election	Michael Kelley	Geoff Davis	
5	Hal Rogers	Re-election		Hal Rogers	Jim Holbert
6	Ben Chandler	Re-election	Ben Chandler	Jon Larson	

== District 1 ==
2008 Kentucky's 1st congressional district election
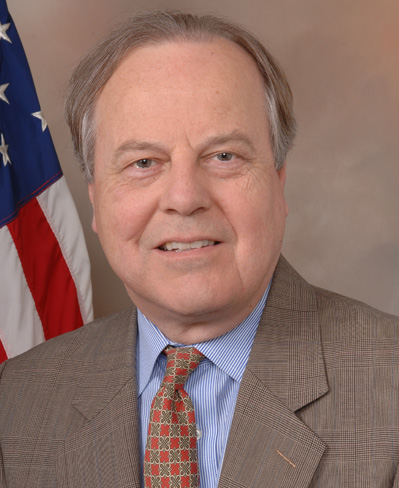

Nominee	Ed Whitfield	Heather Ryan
Party	Republican	Democratic
Popular vote	178,107	98,674
Percentage	64.3%	35.7%
- County results Whitfield: 50–60% 60–70% 70–80% 80–90%
U.S. Representative before election
Ed Whitfield
Republican
Elected U.S. Representative
Ed Whitfield
Republican

This district is in Western Kentucky. The seat had been held by Republican Ed Whitfield since 1995. Heather A. Ryan of Paducah, a self-described Democratic activist, had no primary opposition and faced Whitfield in the general election. CQ Politics forecasts the race as 'Safe Republican'.

Ryan, a Navy veteran and former movie theater manager, launched into the news in January 2008. On January 15, she protested a visit by Mitch McConnell to the non-profit theater where she worked. The theater was raising funds for an expansion and some would potentially come from McConnell. Three days later, the theater's board of directors told her to stay quiet about politics while running the theater. After questioning the request, she was fired. Whitfield declined to debate Ryan before the election. Whitfield won the election with 64% of the vote.

- Race ranking and details from CQ Politics
- Campaign contributions from OpenSecrets

=== Predictions ===
Source	Ranking	As of
The Cook Political Report	Safe R	November 6, 2008
Rothenberg	Safe R	November 2, 2008
Sabato's Crystal Ball	Safe R	November 6, 2008
Real Clear Politics	Safe R	November 7, 2008
CQ Politics	Safe R	November 6, 2008

== District 2 ==
2008 Kentucky's 2nd congressional district election
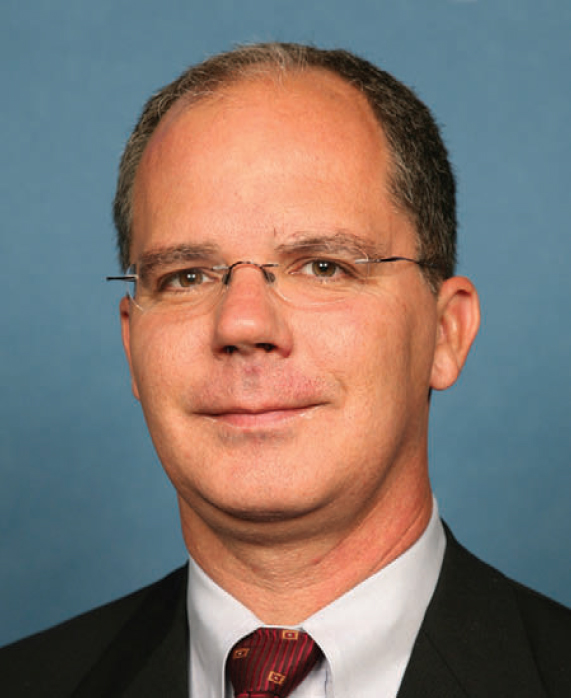

Nominee	Brett Guthrie	David Boswell
Party	Republican	Democratic
Popular vote	158,936	143,379
Percentage	52.6%	47.4%
- County results Guthrie: 50–60% 60–70% Boswell: 50–60% 60–70%
U.S. Representative before election
Ron Lewis
Republican
Elected U.S. Representative
Brett Guthrie
Republican

This district is in Western-central Kentucky. Republican state senator Brett Guthrie won against Democratic state senator David Boswell. In a surprise decision on the filing deadline, Republican incumbent Ron Lewis, who had held the seat since 1994, announced he would not run for re-election in 2008. It was believed that he intended to be succeeded by his chief of staff, Daniel London. However, State Senator Brett Guthrie learned of Lewis' retirement just before the deadline, and filed himself. After Guthrie won some key endorsements, London withdrew from the race, leaving Guthrie unopposed for the Republican nomination. Meanwhile, for the Democratic nomination, State Senator David Boswell got 60,978 votes, defeating Daviess County judge executive Reid Haire, who got 43,073 votes.

Guthrie won the election with 53% of the vote.

- Race ranking and details from CQ Politics
- Campaign contributions from OpenSecrets
- Guthrie (R) vs Boswell (D-i) graph of collected poll results from Pollster.com

=== Opinion polls ===
Source	Date	Democrat: David Boswell	Republican: Brett Guthrie
Survey USA	October 27–28, 2008	43%	53%
Survey USA	October 21–22, 2008	42%	51%
Survey USA	October 15–16, 2008	42%	51%
Survey USA	September 24–25, 2008	43%	49%
Garin-Hart-Yang	August 23–25, 2008	41%	33%
Survey USA	June 27–29, 2008	47%	44%

=== Predictions ===
Source	Ranking	As of
The Cook Political Report	Tossup	November 6, 2008
Rothenberg	Tossup	November 2, 2008
Sabato's Crystal Ball	Lean R	November 6, 2008
Real Clear Politics	Lean R	November 7, 2008
CQ Politics	Lean R	November 6, 2008

== District 3 ==
2008 Kentucky's 3rd congressional district election
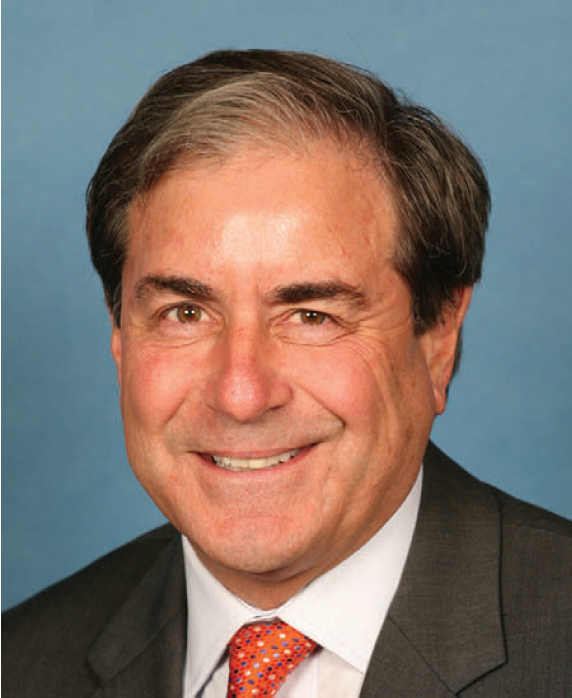

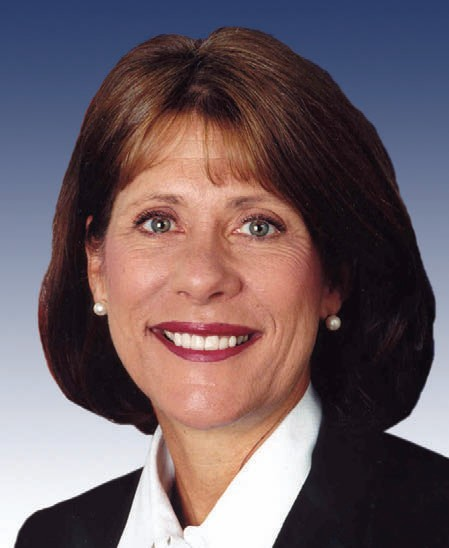
Nominee	John Yarmuth	Anne Northup
Party	Democratic	Republican
Popular vote	203,843	139,527
Percentage	59.4%	40.6%
- Yarmuth: 50–60% 60–70% 70–80% 80–90% >90% Northup: 50–60% 60–70% 70–80% Tie: 50% No data
U.S. Representative before election
John Yarmuth
Democratic
Elected U.S. Representative
John Yarmuth
Democratic

Democratic incumbent John Yarmuth won against Republican nominee Anne Northup, who had held the seat previously. This district consists of Louisville and most of its Jefferson County suburbs. The seat had been held by Northup from 1996 through 2006, when she was defeated by Yarmuth in a year in which Democrats regained control of the house, partially due to the unpopularity of the war in Iraq.

On January 28, 2008, Northup announced she would run for her former congressional seat in the 2008 election. She had previously endorsed Louisville lawyer Erwin Roberts, who had planned to run, and helped raise money for him. However, Roberts withdrew from the race after learning he would likely be called to active duty in the U.S. Army Reserve. Bob DeVore Jr., activist Corley C. Everett and developer Chris Thieneman filed to run in the Republican primary.

Thieneman, who spearheaded a successful campaign to defeat a Jefferson County library tax referendum in 2007 and ran unsuccessfully for Jefferson County Clerk in 2002, dropped out of the race on January 31, declared a return to the Democratic Party, and endorsed John Yarmuth in the election. Theineman said he had been pressured to drop out by people associated with Northup and Kentucky's senior senator Mitch McConnell, but McConnell and Northup denied they had tried to influence Thieneman. Thieneman subsequently reaffirmed he was a Republican, revoked his endorsement of Yarmuth, and unsuspended his campaign. Everett dropped out less than a week before the primary and endorsed Theineman.

Northup won the Republican primary on May 20. Yarmuth was not opposed in the Democratic primary.

=== General election ===
At a press conference held in front of a gas station on June 17, 2008, Northup claimed that the 2008 elections were about the rising price of energy. Over a five-day period in September, Yarmuth's campaign headquarters was broken into twice. The thieves took only computers and storage supplies, leaving behind cash and other valuables.

Northup reminded voters of her accomplishments during her years in office, claimed that she was better suited to get results in the long-delayed effort to build an east end bridge and, as she had often done, argued her opponent was too liberal for voters. A key issue in the election was funding for a Veterans Administration hospital to replace the aging one in Louisville; Yarmuth touted a commitment he and Mitch McConnell secured from the Department of Veterans Affairs to spend at least $60 million on the project, while Northup attempted to downplay the merits of the commitment. Northup also attacked Yarmuth for his eventual vote in favor of the bailout. Yarmuth did not run any attack ads, and generally focused his campaign on informing voters of his accomplishments during his term in the House.

The district's daily newspaper, the Courier-Journal, endorsed Yarmuth on October 25, saying the Democrat had done "an exceptionally good job as a freshman representative, winning widespread recognition as one of the brightest new stars in Congress."

Yarmuth won the election with 59% to 41%.

- Race ranking and details from CQ Politics
- Campaign contributions from OpenSecrets
- Northup (R) vs Yarmuth (D-i) graph of collected poll results from Pollster.com

=== Opinion polls ===
Source	Date	Democrat: John Yarmuth	Republican: Anne Northup
Survey USA	October 21–22, 2008	57%	41%
Survey USA	October 14–15, 2008	57%	41%
Survey USA	September 5–7, 2008	53%	45%
Survey USA	July 18–20, 2008	53%	43%
Survey USA	June 6–8, 2008	57%	40%
Voter/Consumer Research	June 4–8, 2008	51%	43%

=== Predictions ===
Source	Ranking	As of
The Cook Political Report	Likely D	November 6, 2008
Rothenberg	Safe D	November 2, 2008
Sabato's Crystal Ball	Lean D	November 6, 2008
Real Clear Politics	Lean D	November 7, 2008
CQ Politics	Likely D	November 6, 2008

== District 4 ==
2008 Kentucky's 4th congressional district election
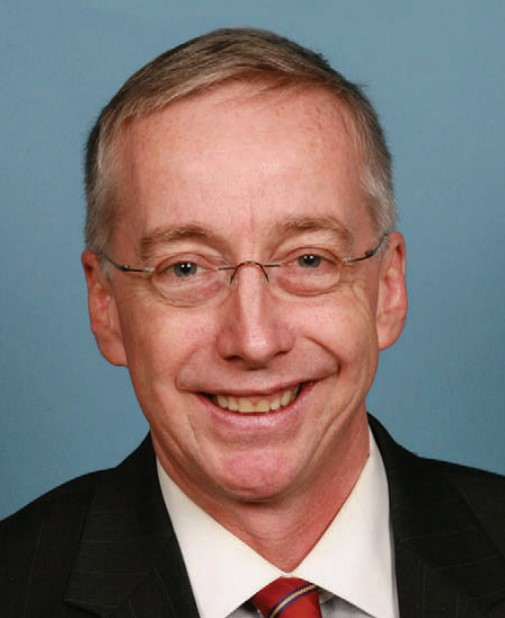

Nominee	Geoff Davis	Michael Kelley
Party	Republican	Democratic
Popular vote	190,210	111,549
Percentage	63.0%	37.0%
- County results Davis: 50–60% 60–70% 70–80% Kelley: 50–60% 60–70%
U.S. Representative before election
Geoff Davis
Republican
Elected U.S. Representative
Geoff Davis
Republican

This district is a long district in Northern Kentucky that follows the Ohio River. The majority of the voters live in the booming largely white and suburban Cincinnati counties of Boone, Kenton and Campbell. Davis won the election with 63% of the vote.

=== Predictions ===
Source	Ranking	As of
The Cook Political Report	Safe R	November 6, 2008
Rothenberg	Safe R	November 2, 2008
Sabato's Crystal Ball	Safe R	November 6, 2008
Real Clear Politics	Safe R	November 7, 2008
CQ Politics	Safe R	November 6, 2008

== District 5 ==
2008 Kentucky's 5th congressional district election
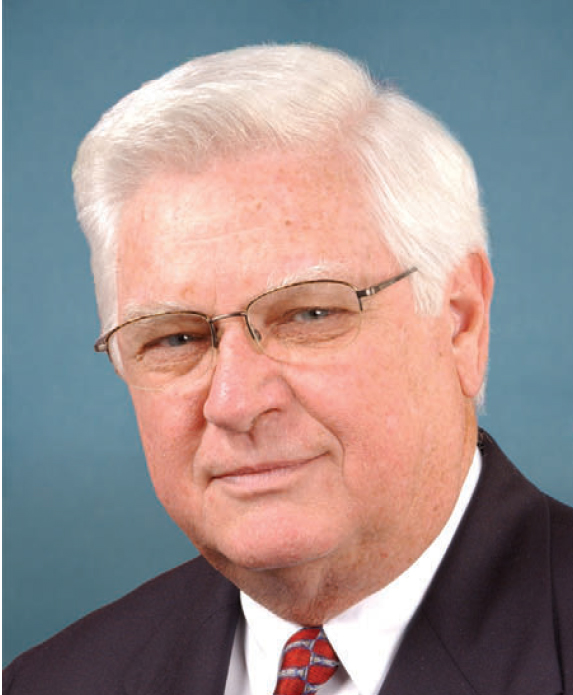

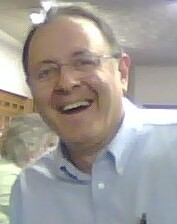
Nominee	Hal Rogers	Jim Holbert
Party	Republican	Independent
Popular vote	177,024	33,444
Percentage	84.1%	15.9%
- County results Rogers: 60–70% 70–80% 80–90% >90%
U.S. Representative before election
Hal Rogers
Republican
Elected U.S. Representative
Hal Rogers
Republican

This district is in Eastern Kentucky. It had been held by Republican Hal Rogers since 1981. He filed to run for re-election in 2008. He was opposed by Independent Jim Holbert.

Rogers won the election with 84% of the vote.

- Race ranking and details from CQ Politics
- Campaign contributions from OpenSecrets

=== Predictions ===
Source	Ranking	As of
The Cook Political Report	Safe R	November 6, 2008
Rothenberg	Safe R	November 2, 2008
Sabato's Crystal Ball	Safe R	November 6, 2008
Real Clear Politics	Safe R	November 7, 2008
CQ Politics	Safe R	November 6, 2008

== District 6 ==
2008 Kentucky's 6th congressional district election
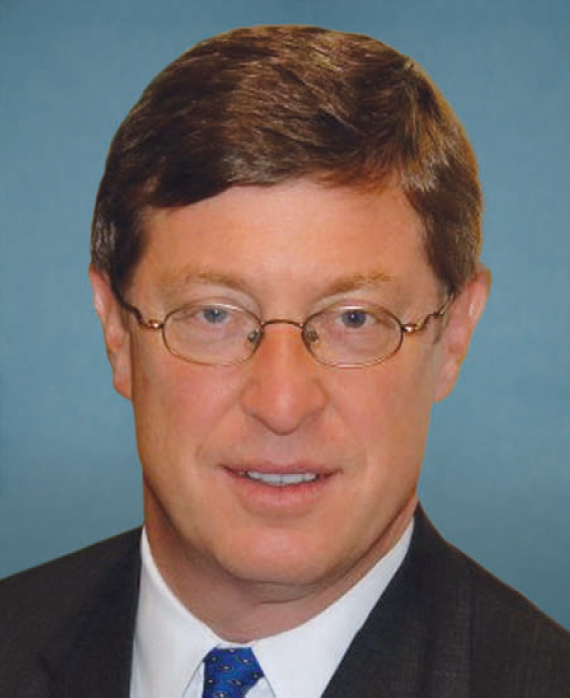

Nominee	Ben Chandler	Jon Larson
Party	Democratic	Republican
Popular vote	203,764	111,378
Percentage	64.7%	35.3%
- County results Chandler: 50–60% 60–70% 70–80%
U.S. Representative before election
Ben Chandler
Democratic
Elected U.S. Representative
Ben Chandler
Democratic

This district is located in central Kentucky. It contains the cities of Lexington (including its suburbs), Danville, and Frankfort, the state capital. Democrat Ben Chandler had held the seat since 2004. He faced Republican Lexington attorney Jon Larson in the general election.

Chandler won the election with 65% of the vote.

- Race ranking and details from CQ Politics
- Campaign contributions from OpenSecrets

=== Predictions ===
Source	Ranking	As of
The Cook Political Report	Safe D	November 6, 2008
Rothenberg	Safe D	November 2, 2008
Sabato's Crystal Ball	Safe D	November 6, 2008
Real Clear Politics	Safe D	November 7, 2008
CQ Politics	Safe D	November 6, 2008

== See also ==
- United States House of Representatives elections, 2008

Preceded by 2006 elections	United States House elections in Kentucky; 2008	Succeeded by 2010 elections
