= Libertarian Party of Kentucky =

State affiliate of the Libertarian Party

- Chairperson: Andrew Roberts
- Founded: 1974; 52 years ago
- Registered voters (August 2026): 15,920
- Ideology: Libertarianism
- Senate: 0 / 38
- House of Representatives: 0 / 100
- U.S. Senate: 0 / 2
- U.S. House of Representatives: 0 / 6
- Elected officials: 4 (May 2026)

Website
- lpky.org

The Libertarian Party of Kentucky is the Kentucky affiliate of the Libertarian Party of the United States. The current state chair is Andrew Roberts.

== Background ==
The Libertarian Party of Kentucky, referred to as "LPKY", is the official state affiliate of the Libertarian Party (United States). The purpose of the Party is to promote libertarianism and elect candidates to office. The Kentucky affiliate has existed since 1974, and is the third-largest political party in Kentucky. Since the Kentucky Secretary of State's office officially began asking county clerks to track the number of Libertarian voter registrations in 2006, via 31 KAR 4:150. As of November 11, 2020, 13,619 Kentucky citizens have registered Libertarian according to the Kentucky Secretary of State voter registration statistics.

After the election of 2020, and prior to 2016, the Libertarian Party of Kentucky was considered a "political group". An unpublished 2008 Kentucky Court of Appeals case stated that political groups are treated as Independents, as no other mechanism would exist for those groups to have their candidates placed on the ballot. Both Independents and political groups do not have automatic ballot access, meaning they must collect signatures on a petition for candidates that wish to run for office. Kentucky's ballot access rules require a different minimum number of signatures based on the office being sought, ranging between 25 and 5,000.

As a result of the 2016 general election results for president in Kentucky, the Libertarian Party was considered, under Kentucky Revised Statutes 118.015, to be a political organization for the years 2017 through 2020. Political organizations are those whose candidate for president received at least 2%, but less than 20%, of the popular vote in the state of Kentucky in the last general election. A "political organization", the second tier in a three-tier system, grants that party ballot access, but denies them a state-operated primary. The presidential race is the only metric used for ballot access in Kentucky, and there is no mechanism for a party to petition for access in Kentucky.

== Partisan elections – Candidates ==
Three Justices of the Peace have been elected as Libertarians: Lex Hannan of Boone County, and David Harryman and Shannon Denniston of Montgomery County.

Candidates for partisan offices that wish to run as a Libertarian are nominated at a nomination convention, which can be, and historically has been, held in conjunction with the state party annual convention. A vote of registered Libertarians at convention determines who the candidate will be. All candidates must also defeat NOTA (None of the Above) in order to obtain the ability to run as a Libertarian. The LPKY State Party Executive Committee can vote to add additional candidates after the convention.

== Non-partisan elections ==
The party has endorsed two councilmen who have held the position: Chad Finkenbiner of Orchard Grass Hills and Brandon Wright of Cave City.

== Electoral history ==
=== Statewide elections ===
Year	Election	Candidate(s)	Votes	%	P.	Result	Ref.
1980	President	Ed Clark / David H. Koch	5,531	0.43%	4th	Lost	
1988	President	Ron Paul / Andre Marrou	2,118	0.16%	4th	Lost	
1992	President	Andre' Marrou / Nancy Lord	4,513	0.30%	4th	Lost	
1992	US Senate	James A. Ridenour	17,366	1.30%	3rd	Lost	
1996	President	Harry Browne / Jo Jorgensen	4,009	0.29%	4th	Lost	
1996	US Senate	Dennis L. Lacy	8,595	0.66%	3rd	Lost	
2000	President	Harry Browne / Art Olivier	2,896	0.19%	5th	Lost	
2004	President	Michael Badnarik / Richard V. Campagna	2,619	0.14%	4th	Lost	
2008	President	Bob Barr / Wayne A. Root	5,989	0.33%	4th	Lost	
2011	State Treasurer	Kenneth C. Moellman Jr.	37,261	4.62%	3rd	Lost	
2012	President	Gary Johnson / James P. Gray	17,063	0.95%	3rd	Lost	
2014	US Senate	David M. Patterson	44,240	3.08%	3rd	Lost	
2016	President	Gary Johnson / Bill Weld	53,752	2.79%	3rd	Lost	
2019	Governor	John Hicks / Ann Cormican	28,433	1.97%	3rd	Lost	
2019	Auditor of Public Accounts	Kyle Hugenberg	46,563	3.32%	3rd	Lost	
2019	Commissioner of Agriculture	Josh Gilpin	44,596	3.16%	3rd	Lost	
2020	President	Jo Jorgensen / Jeremy "Spike" Cohen	26,234	1.23%	3rd	Lost	
2020	US Senate	Brad Barron	85,386	4.00%	3rd	Lost	
2024	President	Chase Oliver / Mike ter Maat	6,422	0.31%	5th	Lost	

=== Congressional elections ===
Year	District	Candidate	Votes	%	P.	Result	Ref.
1982	KY-03	Dan Murray	608	0.43%	4th	Lost	
1982	KY-04	Paul Thiel	706	0.52%	3rd	Lost	
1982	KY-06	Ken Ashby	1,185	0.99%	3rd	Lost	
1984	KY-06	Tony Suruda	924	0.53%	3rd	Lost	
2000	KY-02	Michael A. Kirkman	2,125	0.89%	3rd	Lost	
2000	KY-03	Donna Walker Mancini	7,804	2.90%	3rd	Lost	
2000	KY-04	Alan Handleman	1,486	0.64%	4th	Lost	
2000	KY-06	Joseph Novak	1,229	0.45%	4th	Lost	
2002	KY-02	Robert Guy Dyer	2,084	1.18%	3rd	Lost	
2002	KY-04	John Grote	2,308	1.34%	3rd	Lost	
2002	KY-06	Mark Gailey	3,313	2.06%	3rd	Lost	
2004	KY-03	George C. Dick	6,363	1.94%	3rd	Lost	
2004	KY-06	Mark Gailey	1,758	0.59%	4th	Lost	
2006	KY-03	Donna Walker Mancini	2,134	0.88%	3rd	Lost	
2006	KY-04	Brian Houillion	10,100	4.93%	3rd	Lost	
2006	KY-06	Paul Ard	27,015	14.54%	2nd	Lost	
2010	KY-03	Edward A. Martin	2,029	0.79%	3rd	Lost	
2012	KY-02	Craig R. Astor	4,914	1.74%	4th	Lost	
2018	KY-03	Gregory Boles	3,788	1.36%	3rd	Lost	
2018	KY-06	Frank Harris	2,150	0.71%	3rd	Lost	
2020	KY-02	Robert Lee Perry	7,588	2.11%	3rd	Lost	
2020	KY-06	Frank Harris	6,491	1.72%	3rd	Lost	

== See also ==
- List of state Libertarian Parties in the United States
