= 2004 United States House of Representatives election ratings =

Predictions for select races in the 2004 U.S. House elections

The 2004 United States House of Representatives elections were held on November 2, 2004, with early voting taking place in some states in the weeks preceding that date. Voters chose representatives from all 435 congressional districts across each of the 50 U.S. states. Non-voting delegates from the District of Columbia and four inhabited U.S. territories were also elected. These elections took place alongside the simultaneous presidential election. The winners served in the 105th United States Congress, with seats apportioned among the states based on the 2000 United States census. On Election Day, Republicans had held a House majority since January 1995.

== Predictions on overall outcome ==
- Sabato's Crystal Ball
  - In November 2004, Sabato projected the Democrats would take 203 seats (Note: An independent caucuses with the Democrats), and the Republicans 232.
- Cook Political Report
  - In November 2004, Cook Political Report projected the Democrats would take 196 seats (Note: An independent caucuses with the Democrats), the Republicans 223, and there were 16 tossups.

== Election ratings ==
Several sites and individuals publish ratings of competitive seats. The seats listed below were considered competitive (not "safe" or "solid") by at least one of the rating groups. These ratings are based upon factors such as the strength of the incumbent (if the incumbent is running for re-election), the strength of the candidates, and the partisan history of the district (the Cook Partisan Voting Index is one example of this metric). Each rating describes the likelihood of a given outcome in the election.

Most election ratings use:

- Tossup: no advantage
- Tilt (sometimes used): slight advantage
- Lean: clear advantage
- Likely: strong, but not certain advantage
- Safe: outcome is nearly certain

The following table contains the final ratings of the competitiveness of selected races according to noted political analysts. Races that were considered safe for the incumbent's party are not included. Incumbents who did not run for re-election have parentheses around their name.

District	Incumbent	Previous result	Sabato's Crystal Ball November 1, 2004	The Cook Political Report October 29, 2004	Winner
Arizona 1	Rick Renzi (R)	49.21% R	Tilt R	Lean R	Rick Renzi (R)
California 20	Cal Dooley (D) (retiring)	63.70% D	Safe D	Lean D	Jim Costa (D)
Colorado 3	Scott McInnis (R) (retiring)	65.84% R	Lean D (flip)	Tossup	John Salazar (D)
Colorado 4	Marilyn Musgrave (R)	54.94% R	Safe R	Likely R	Marilyn Musgrave (R)
Colorado 7	Bob Beauprez (R)	47.34% R	Lean R	Lean R	Bob Beauprez (R)
Connecticut 2	Rob Simmons (R)	54.09% R	Safe R	Tossup	Rob Simmons (R)
Connecticut 4	Chris Shays (R)	64.43% R	Safe R	Tossup	Chris Shays (R)
Florida 2	Allen Boyd (D)	66.90% D	Safe D	Likely D	Allen Boyd (D)
Florida 13	Katherine Harris (R)	54.79% R	Safe R	Likely R	Katherine Harris (R)
Georgia 3	Jim Marshall (D)	50.51% D	Lean D	Lean D	Jim Marshall (D)
Georgia 12	Max Burns (R)	55.19% R	Tilt D (flip)	Tossup	John Barrow (D)
Illinois 8	Phil Crane (R)	57.34% R	Lean R	Tossup	Melissa Bean (D)
Indiana 2	Chris Chocola (R)	50.45% R	Safe R	Likely R	Chris Chocola (R)
Indiana 8	John Hostettler (R)	51.31% R	Lean R	Lean R	John Hostettler (R)
Indiana 9	Baron Hill (D)	51.15% D	Lean D	Lean D	Mike Sodrel (R)
Iowa 1	Jim Nussle (R)	57.27% R	Safe R	Likely R	Jim Nussle (R)
Iowa 3	Leonard Boswell (D)	53.43% D	Lean D	Lean D	Leonard Boswell (D)
Kansas 2	Jim Ryun (R)	60.42% R	Safe R	Likely R	Jim Ryun (R)
Kansas 3	Dennis Moore (D)	50.18% D	Lean D	Lean D	Dennis Moore (D)
Kentucky 3	Anne Northup (R)	52.61% R	Lean R	Lean R	Anne Northup (R)
Kentucky 4	Ken Lucas (D) (retiring)	51.11% D	Tilt R (flip)	Tossup	Geoff Davis (R)
Louisiana 3	Billy Tauzin (R) (retiring)	86.68% R	Lean R	Tossup	Charlie Melançon (D)
Louisiana 7	Chris John (D) (retiring)	86.82% D	Tilt R (flip)	Tossup	Charles Boustany (R)
Maine 2	Mike Michaud (D)	52.01% D	Safe D	Likely D	Mike Michaud (D)
Minnesota 2	John Kline (R)	53.39% R	Safe R	Likely R	John Kline (R)
Minnesota 6	Mark Kennedy (R)	57.41% R	Safe R	Lean R	Mark Kennedy (R)
Missouri 5	Karen McCarthy (D) (retiring)	65.88% D	Safe D	Tossup	Emanuel Cleaver (D)
Nebraska 1	Doug Bereuter (R) (retiring)	85.35% R	Lean R	Lean R	Jeff Fortenberry (R)
Nebraska 2	Lee Terry (R)	63.32% R	Safe R	Likely R	Lee Terry (R)
Nevada 3	Jon Porter (R)	56.08% R	Safe R	Lean R	Jon Porter (R)
New Hampshire 2	Charlie Bass (R)	56.84% R	Safe R	Likely R	Charlie Bass (R)
New Jersey 7	Mike Ferguson (R)	57.95% R	Safe R	Likely R	Mike Ferguson (R)
New Mexico 1	Heather Wilson (R)	55.34% R	Safe R	Tossup	Heather Wilson (R)
New Mexico 2	Steve Pearce (R)	56.26% R	Safe R	Likely R	Steve Pearce (R)
New York 1	Tim Bishop (D)	50.23% D	Lean D	Lean D	Tim Bishop (D)
New York 27	Jack Quinn (R) (retiring)	69.06% R	Tilt R	Tossup	Brian Higgins (D)
New York 29	Amo Houghton (R) (retiring)	73.10% R	Safe R	Likely R	Randy Kuhl (R)
North Carolina 11	Charles H. Taylor (R)	55.54% R	Safe R	Lean R	Charles H. Taylor (R)
North Dakota at-large	Earl Pomeroy (D)	52.41% D	Safe D	Lean D	Earl Pomeroy (D)
Oregon 1	David Wu (D)	62.69% D	Lean D	Lean D	David Wu (D)
Oregon 5	Darlene Hooley (D)	54.75% D	Safe D	Likely D	Darlene Hooley (D)
Pennsylvania 6	Jim Gerlach (R)	51.37% R	Lean R	Lean R	Jim Gerlach (R)
Pennsylvania 8	Jim Greenwood (R) (retiring)	62.59% R	Safe R	Lean R	Mike Fitzpatrick (R)
Pennsylvania 13	Joe Hoeffel (D) (retiring)	50.95% D	Lean D	Lean D	Allyson Schwartz (D)
Pennsylvania 15	Pat Toomey (R) (retiring)	57.36% R	Lean R	Likely R	Charlie Dent (R)
Pennsylvania 17	Tim Holden (D) (retiring)	51.41% D	Lean D	Likely D	Tim Holden (D)
South Dakota at-large	Stephanie Herseth Sandlin (D)	50.57% D	Lean D	Lean D	Stephanie Herseth Sandlin (D)
Tennessee 4	Lincoln Davis (D)	52.10% D	Safe D	Likely D	Lincoln Davis (D)
Texas 1	Max Sandlin (D)	56.45% D	Lean R (flip)	Tossup	Louie Gohmert (R)
Texas 2	Nick Lampson (D)	60.85% D	Lean R (flip)	Tossup	Ted Poe (R)
Texas 17	Chet Edwards (D)	51.36% D	Lean D	Tossup	Chet Edwards (D)
Texas 19	Randy Neugebauer (R)	91.64% R	Lean R	Lean R	Randy Neugebauer (R)
Texas 32	Pete Sessions (R)	67.77% R	Tilt R	Tossup	Pete Sessions (R)
Utah 2	Jim Matheson (D)	49.43% D	Lean D	Lean D	Jim Matheson (D)
Virginia 2	Ed Schrock (R) (retiring)	83.45% R	Safe R	Lean R	Thelma Drake (R)
Virginia 9	Rick Boucher (D)	65.77% D	Safe D	Likely D	Rick Boucher (D)
Washington 5	George Nethercutt (R) (retiring)	62.66% R	Lean R	Lean R	Cathy McMorris Rodgers (R)
Washington 8	Jennifer Dunn (R) (retiring)	59.82% R	Tilt R	Tossup	Dave Reichert (R)
Overall			R - 232; D - 203 (Note: An independent caucuses with the Democrats)	R - 223; D - 196 (Note: An independent caucuses with the Democrats); 16 tossups	R - 232; D - 203 (Note: An independent caucuses with the Democrats)
