= 2002 United States House of Representatives elections in Kentucky =

- November 5, 2002

All 6 Kentucky seats to the United States House of Representatives
	Majority party	Minority party
Party	Republican	Democratic
Last election	5	1
Seats won	5	1
Seat change	Steady	Steady
Popular vote	693,860	350,924
Percentage	63.41%	32.07%
Swing	▲5.94%	▼7.07%

Republican
50–60%
60–70%
70–80%
80–90%
Democratic
50–60%
60–70%
70–80%
80–90%

The 2002 House elections in Kentucky occurred on November 5, 2002, to elect the members of the State of Kentucky's delegation to the United States House of Representatives. Kentucky had six seats in the House, apportioned according to the 2000 United States census. All six incumbent representatives won reelection.

== Overview ==
United States House of Representatives elections in Kentucky, 2002
Party	Votes	Percentage	Seats	+/–
Republican	693,860	63.41%	5	-
Democratic	350,924	32.07%	1	-
Independents	41,753	3.82%	0	-
Libertarian	7,705	0.70%	0	-
Totals	1,094,242	100.00%	6	-

== District 1 ==
2002 Kentucky's 1st congressional district election
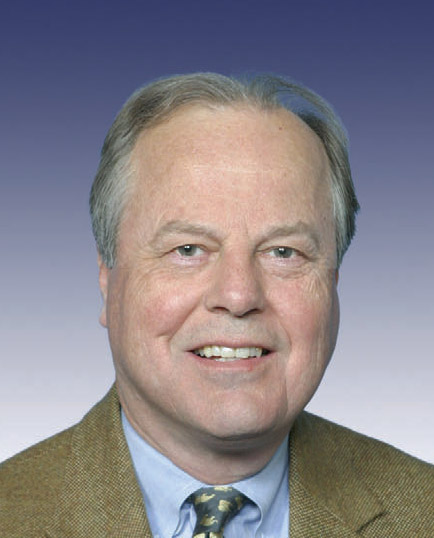

Nominee	Ed Whitfield	Klint Alexander
Party	Republican	Democratic
Popular vote	117,600	62,617
Percentage	65.3%	34.7%
- County results Whitfield: 50–60% 60–70% 70–80% 80–90%
U.S. Representative before election
Ed Whitfield
Republican
Elected U.S. Representative
Ed Whitfield
Republican

Incumbent Republican Congressman Ed Whitfield won reelection.

=== Predictions ===
Source	Ranking	As of
Sabato's Crystal Ball	Safe R	November 4, 2002
New York Times	Safe R	October 14, 2002

=== Results ===
Kentucky's 1st congressional district election, 2002
Party	Candidate	Votes	%
Republican	Ed Whitfield (inc.)	117,600	65.25
Democratic	Klint Alexander	62,617	34.75
Total votes		180,217	100.00
Republican hold			

== District 2 ==
2002 Kentucky's 2nd congressional district election
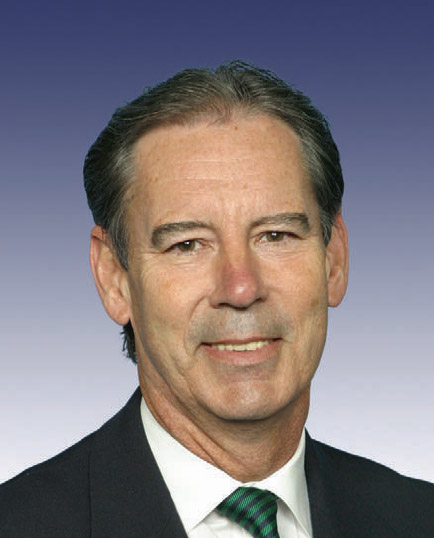

Nominee	Ron Lewis	David Williams
Party	Republican	Democratic
Popular vote	122,773	51,431
Percentage	69.6%	29.2%
- County results Lewis: 50–60% 60–70% 70–80% 80–90%
U.S. Representative before election
Ron Lewis
Republican
Elected U.S. Representative
Ron Lewis
Republican

Incumbent Republican Congressman Ron Lewis won reelection.

=== Predictions ===
Source	Ranking	As of
Sabato's Crystal Ball	Safe R	November 4, 2002
New York Times	Safe R	October 14, 2002

=== Results ===
Kentucky's 2nd congressional district election, 2002
Party	Candidate	Votes	%
Republican	Ron Lewis (inc.)	122,773	69.64
Democratic	Adam Smith	51,431	29.17
Libertarian	Robert Guy Dyer	2,084	1.18
Total votes		176,288	100.00
Republican hold			

== District 3 ==
2002 Kentucky's 3rd congressional district election
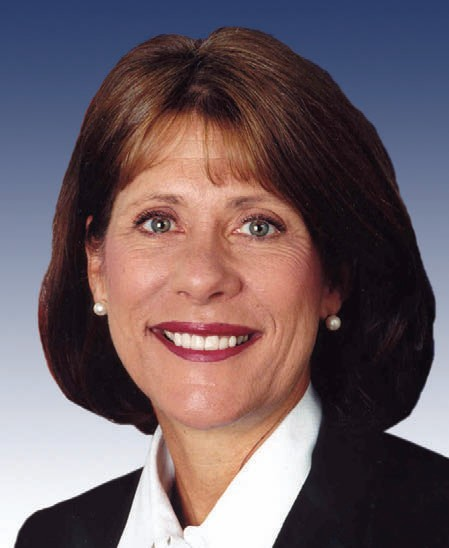

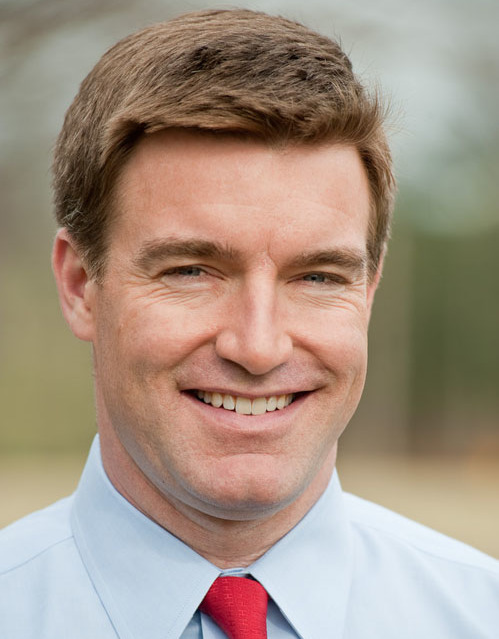
Nominee	Anne Northup	Jack Conway
Party	Republican	Democratic
Popular vote	118,228	110,846
Percentage	51.6%	48.4%
U.S. Representative before election
Anne Northup
Republican
Elected U.S. Representative
Anne Northup
Republican

Incumbent Republican Congresswoman Anne Northup defeated Democratic candidate Jack Conway to win reelection.

=== Predictions ===
Source	Ranking	As of
Sabato's Crystal Ball	Lean R	November 4, 2002
New York Times	Tossup	October 14, 2002

=== Results ===
Kentucky's 3rd congressional district election, 2002
Party	Candidate	Votes	%
Republican	Anne Northup (inc.)	118,228	51.61
Democratic	Jack Conway	110,846	48.39
Total votes		229,074	100.00
Republican hold			

== District 4 ==
2002 Kentucky's 4th congressional district election
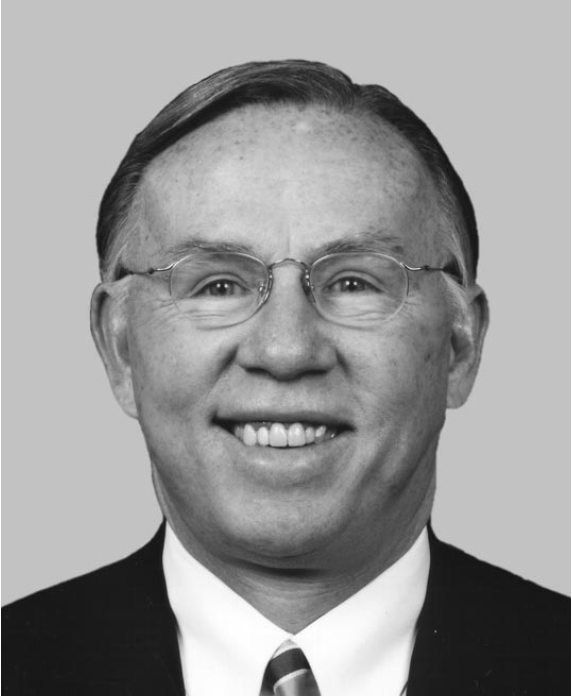

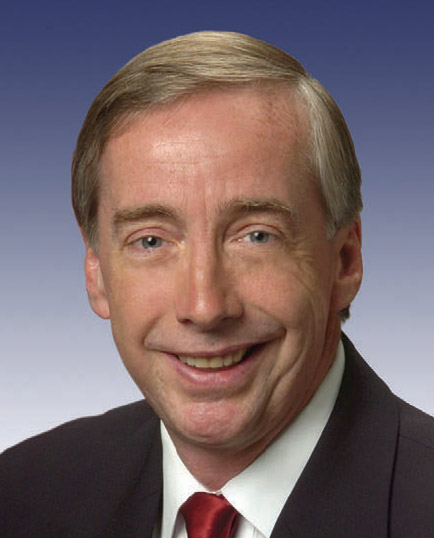
Nominee	Ken Lucas	Geoff Davis
Party	Democratic	Republican
Popular vote	87,776	81,651
Percentage	51.1%	47.5%
- County results Lucas: 50–60% 60–70% 70–80% 80–90% Davis: 50–60% 60–70%
U.S. Representative before election
Ken Lucas
Democratic
Elected U.S. Representative
Ken Lucas
Democratic

Incumbent Democratic Congressman Ken Lucas defeated Republican candidate Geoff Davis to win reelection.

=== Predictions ===
Source	Ranking	As of
Sabato's Crystal Ball	Lean D	November 4, 2002
New York Times	Lean D	October 14, 2002

=== Results ===
Kentucky's 4th congressional district election, 2002
Party	Candidate	Votes	%
Democratic	Ken Lucas (inc.)	87,776	51.11
Republican	Geoff Davis	81,651	47.54
Libertarian	John Grote	2,308	1.34
Total votes		171,735	100.00
Democratic hold			

== District 5 ==
2002 Kentucky's 5th congressional district election
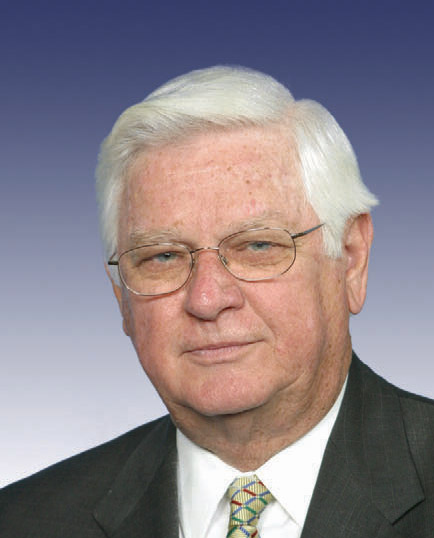

Nominee	Hal Rogers	Sidney Jane Bailey
Party	Republican	Democratic
Popular vote	137,986	38,254
Percentage	78.3%	21.7%
- County results Rogers: 50–60% 60–70% 70–80% 80–90% Bailey: 50–60%
U.S. Representative before election
Hal Rogers
Republican
Elected U.S. Representative
Hal Rogers
Republican

Incumbent Republican Congressman Hal Rogers won reelection.

=== Predictions ===
Source	Ranking	As of
Sabato's Crystal Ball	Safe R	November 4, 2002
New York Times	Safe R	October 14, 2002

=== Results ===
Kentucky's 5th congressional district election, 2002
Party	Candidate	Votes	%
Republican	Hal Rogers (inc.)	137,986	78.29
Democratic	Sidney Jane Bailey	38,254	21.71
Total votes		176,240	100.00
Republican hold			

== District 6 ==
2002 Kentucky's 6th congressional district election
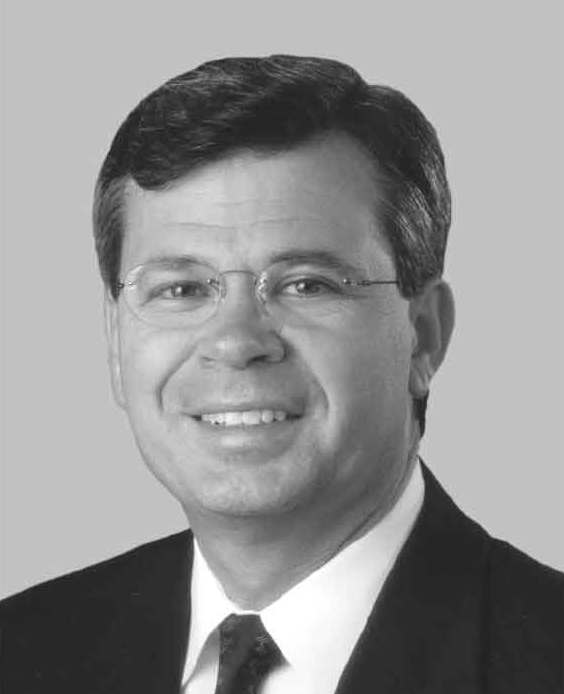

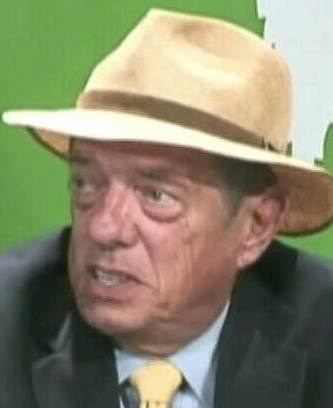
Nominee	Ernie Fletcher	Gatewood Galbraith
Party	Republican	Independent
Popular vote	115,622	41,753
Percentage	72.0%	26.0%
- County results Fletcher: 60–70% 70–80% 80–90%
U.S. Representative before election
Ernie Fletcher
Republican
Elected U.S. Representative
Ernie Fletcher
Republican

Incumbent Republican Congressman Ernie Fletcher won reelection. Fletcher defeated independent candidate Gatewood Galbraith, as no Democratic candidate filed to run.

=== Predictions ===
Source	Ranking	As of
Sabato's Crystal Ball	Safe R	November 4, 2002
New York Times	Safe R	October 14, 2002

=== Results ===
Kentucky's 6th congressional district election, 2002
Party	Candidate	Votes	%
Republican	Ernie Fletcher (inc.)	115,622	71.95
Independent	Gatewood Galbraith	41,753	25.98
Libertarian	Mark Gailey	3,313	2.06
Total votes		160,688	100.00
Republican hold			

Preceded by 2000 elections	United States House elections in Kentucky; 2002	Succeeded by 2004 elections
