= 2002 United States House of Representatives election ratings =

Predictions for select races in the 2002 U.S. House elections

The 2002 United States House of Representatives elections were held on November 5, 2002, with early voting taking place in some states in the weeks preceding that date. Voters chose representatives from all 435 congressional districts across each of the 50 U.S. states. Non-voting delegates from the District of Columbia and three inhabited U.S. territories were also elected. The winners served in the 104th United States Congress, with seats apportioned among the states based on the 2000 United States census for the first time. On Election Day, Republicans had held a House majority since January 1995.

== Predictions on overall outcome ==
- Sabato's Crystal Ball
  - In November 2002, Sabato projected the Democrats would take 208 seats (Note: An independent caucuses with the Democrats), and the Republicans 226.
- New York Times
  - In October 2002, New York Times projected the Democrats would take 201 seats (Note: An independent caucuses with the Democrats), the Republicans 213, and there were 21 tossups.

== Election ratings ==
Several sites and individuals publish ratings of competitive seats. The seats listed below were considered competitive (not "safe" or "solid") by at least one of the rating groups. These ratings are based upon factors such as the strength of the incumbent (if the incumbent is running for re-election), the strength of the candidates, and the partisan history of the district (the Cook Partisan Voting Index is one example of this metric). Each rating describes the likelihood of a given outcome in the election.

Most election ratings use:

- Tossup: no advantage
- Tilt (sometimes used): slight advantage
- Lean: clear advantage
- Likely: strong, but not certain advantage
- Safe: outcome is nearly certain

The following table contains the final ratings of the competitiveness of selected races according to noted political analysts. Races that were considered safe for the incumbent's party are not included. Incumbents who did not run for re-election have parentheses around their name.

District	Incumbent	Previous result	Sabato's Crystal Ball November 4, 2002	New York Times October 14, 2002	Winner
Alabama 3	Bob Riley (R) (retiring)	87.46% R	Lean R	Lean R	Mike Rogers (R)
Arizona 1	(New seat)		Lean R	Tossup	Rick Renzi (R)
California 18	Gary Condit (D) (lost renomination)	67.10% D	Lean D	Tossup	Dennis Cardoza (D)
Colorado 4	Bob Schaffer (R) (retiring)	80.89% R	Lean R	Tossup	Marilyn Musgrave (R)
Colorado 7	(New seat)		Lean D (flip)	Tossup	Bob Beauprez (R)
Connecticut 2	Rob Simmons (R)	50.63% R	Lean R	Lean R	Rob Simmons (R)
Connecticut 5	Jim Maloney (D)	53.62% D	Lean R (flip)	Tossup	Nancy Johnson (R)
Florida 5	Karen Thurman (D)	64.27% D	Lean D	Lean D	Ginny Brown-Waite (R)
Florida 7	John Mica (R)	63.21% R	Lean R	Safe R	John Mica (R)
Florida 22	Clay Shaw (R)	50.14% R	Safe R	Lean R	Clay Shaw (R)
Florida 24	(New seat)		Lean R (flip)	Lean R (flip)	Tom Feeney (R)
Georgia 3	Saxby Chambliss (R) (retiring)	58.92% R	Lean D (flip)	Lean D (flip)	Jim Marshall (D)
Georgia 11	(New seat)		Lean D (flip)	Lean D (flip)	Phil Gingrey (R)
Georgia 12	(New seat)		Lean R (flip)	Lean D (flip)	Max Burns (R)
Illinois 19	David D. Phelps (R)	64.56% D	Lean R (flip)	Lean R (flip)	John Shimkus (R)
Indiana 2	Tim Roemer (D) (retiring)	51.58% D	Lean R (flip)	Tossup	Chris Chocola (R)
Indiana 7	Julia Carson (D)	58.51% D	Lean D	Lean D	Julia Carson (D)
Iowa 1	Jim Nussle (R)	55.40% R	Lean R	Lean R	Jim Nussle (R)
Iowa 2	Jim Leach (R)	61.83% R	Lean R	Lean R	Jim Leach (R)
Iowa 3	Leonard Boswell (D)	62.83% D	Safe D	Lean D	Leonard Boswell (D)
Iowa 4	Tom Latham (R)	68.77% R	Lean R	Safe R	Tom Latham (R)
Kansas 2	Jim Ryun (R)	67.39% R	Safe R	Likely R	Jim Ryun (R)
Kansas 3	Dennis Moore (D)	50.05% D	Lean D	Lean D	Dennis Moore (D)
Kentucky 3	Anne Northup (R)	52.87% R	Lean R	Tossup	Anne Northup (R)
Kentucky 4	Ken Lucas (D)	55.26% D	Lean D	Lean D	Ken Lucas (D)
Louisiana 5	John Cooksey (R) (retiring)	69.08% R	Lean R	Lean R	Rodney Alexander (D)
Maine 2	John Baldacci (D) (retiring)	73.43% D	Lean D	Tossup	Mike Michaud (D)
Maryland 2	Robert Ehrlich (R) (retiring)	68.64% R	Lean D (flip)	Tossup	Dutch Ruppersberger (D)
Maryland 8	Connie Morella (R)	52.05% R	Lean D (flip)	Tossup	Chris Van Hollen (D)
Michigan 10	David Bonior (D) (retiring)	64.41% D	Lean R (flip)	Safe R (flip)	Candice Miller (R)
Michigan 11	(New seat)		Lean R	Tossup	Thad McCotter (R)
Minnesota 2	Bill Luther (D)	49.56% D	Lean R (flip)	Tossup	John Kline (R)
Minnesota 6	Mark Kennedy (R)	48.10% R	Lean R	Safe R	Mark Kennedy (R)
Mississippi 3	Chip Pickering (R)	73.16% R	Lean R	Lean R	Chip Pickering (R)
Nevada 3	(New seat)		Lean R (flip)	Lean R (flip)	Jon Porter (R)
New Hampshire 1	John E. Sununu (R)	52.90% R	Lean R	Tossup	Jeb Bradley (R)
New Hampshire 2	Charlie Bass (R)	56.23% R	Safe R	Lean R	Charlie Bass (R)
New Jersey 5	Marge Roukema (R)	65.37% R	Lean R	Lean R	Scott Garrett (R)
New Mexico 1	Heather Wilson (R)	50.34% R	Lean R	Lean R	Heather Wilson (R)
New Mexico 2	Joe Skeen (R) (retiring)	58.11% R	Lean R	Tossup	Steve Pearce (R)
New York 1	Felix Grucci (R)	55.52% R	Lean D (flip)	Safe R	Tim Bishop (D)
North Carolina 8	Robin Hayes (R)	55.02% R	Lean R	Lean R	Robin Hayes (R)
North Dakota at-large	Earl Pomeroy (D)	52.93% D	Lean D	Lean D	Earl Pomeroy (D)
Ohio 3	Tony P. Hall (D) (retiring)	82.96% D	Lean R (flip)	Safe R (flip)	Mike Turner (R)
Ohio 17	(Vacant)		Lean D	Safe D	Tim Ryan (D)
Oklahoma 4	J.C. Watts (R) (retiring)	64.89% R	Lean R	Lean R	Tom Cole (R)
Pennsylvania 6	(New Seat)		Safe R (flip)	Lean R (flip)	Jim Gerlach (R)
Pennsylvania 15	Pat Toomey (R)	53.25% R	Lean R	Safe R	Pat Toomey (R)
Pennsylvania 17	George Gekas (R)	71.52% R	Lean D (flip)	Tossup	Tim Holden (D)
South Dakota at-large	John Thune (R) (retiring)	73.52% R	Lean R (flip)	Tossup	Bill Janklow (R)
Tennessee 4	Van Hilleary (R) (retiring)	65.76% R	Lean D (flip)	Lean D (flip)	Lincoln Davis (D)
Texas 5	(New Seat)		Safe R	Lean R	Jeb Hensarling (R)
Texas 23	Henry Bonilla (R)	59.32% R	Lean R	Safe R	Henry Bonilla (R)
Utah 2	Jim Matheson (D)	55.86% D	Lean D	Lean D	Jim Matheson (D)
Washington 2	Rick Larsen (D)	50.01% D	Lean D	Safe D	Rick Larsen (D)
West Virginia 2	Shelley Moore Capito (R)	48.49% R	Lean R	Lean R	Shelley Moore Capito (R)
Overall			R - 226; D - 208 (Note: An independent caucuses with the Democrats)	R - 213; D - 201 (Note: An independent caucuses with the Democrats); 21 tossups	R - 229; D - 205 (Note: An independent caucuses with the Democrats)
