= 2004 United States House of Representatives elections in Kentucky =

- November 2, 2004

All 6 Kentucky seats to the United States House of Representatives
	Majority party	Minority party
Party	Republican	Democratic
Last election	5	1
Seats before	4	2
Seats won	5	1
Seat change	▲1	▼1
Popular vote	1,017,379	602,085
Percentage	62.22%	36.82%
Swing	▼1.19%	▲4.75%

Republican
40–50%
50–60%
60–70%
70–80%
80–90%
90–100%
Democratic
40–50%
50–60%
60–70%
70–80%

The 2004 House elections in Kentucky occurred on November 2, 2004, to elect the members of the State of Kentucky's delegation to the United States House of Representatives. Kentucky had six seats in the House, apportioned according to the 2000 United States census.

These elections occurred simultaneously with the United States Senate elections of 2004 (including one in Kentucky), the United States House elections in other states, and various state and local elections.

Though Democrats picked up a seat via a special election in the 6th congressional district in February of that year, this was later cancelled out by a victory for Republicans in the Fourth district.

== Overview ==
United States House of Representatives elections in Kentucky, 2004
Party	Votes	Percentage	Seats	+/–
Republican	1,017,379	62.22%	5	+1
Democratic	602,085	36.82%	1	-1
Libertarian	8,121	0.50%	0	-
Independents	5,270	0.32%	0	—
Constitution	2,388	0.15%	0	-
Totals	1,635,243	100.00%	6	—

== District 1 ==
2004 Kentucky's 1st congressional district election
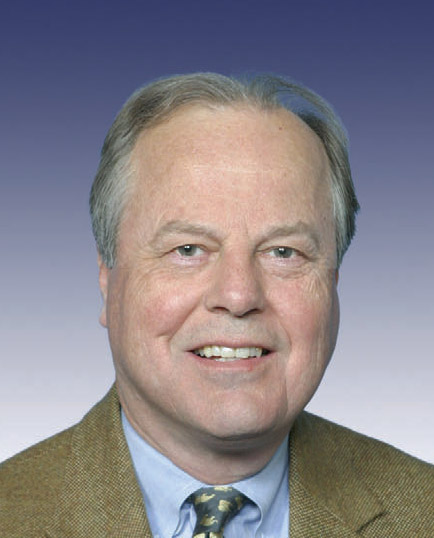

Nominee	Ed Whitfield	Billy Cartwright
Party	Republican	Democratic
Popular vote	175,972	85,229
Percentage	67.3%	32.6%
- County results Whitfield: 50–60% 60–70% 70–80% 80–90%
U.S. Representative before election
Ed Whitfield
Republican
Elected U.S. Representative
Ed Whitfield
Republican

Incumbent Republican Congressman Ed Whitfield defeated Democratic challenger Billy Cartwright by a solid margin in this solidly-conservative west Kentucky-based district.

=== Predictions ===
Source	Ranking	As of
The Cook Political Report	Safe R	October 29, 2004
Sabato's Crystal Ball	Safe R	November 1, 2004

=== Results ===
Kentucky's 1st congressional district election, 2004)
Party	Candidate	Votes	%
Republican	Ed Whitfield (inc.)	175,972	67.32
Democratic	Billy R. Cartwright	85,229	32.61
Write-ins		186	0.07
Total votes		261,387	100.00
Republican hold			

== District 2 ==
2004 Kentucky's 2nd congressional district election
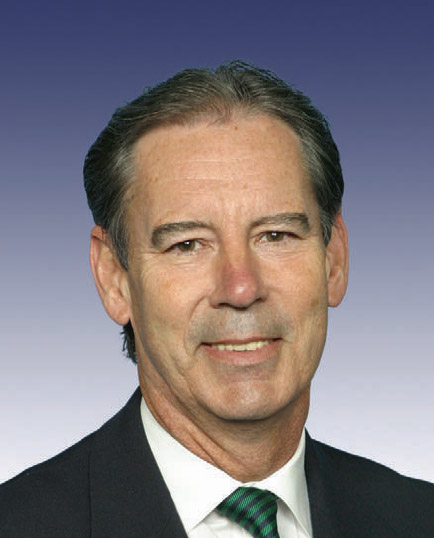

Nominee	Ron Lewis	Adam Smith
Party	Republican	Democratic
Popular vote	185,394	87,585
Percentage	68.0%	32.0%
- County results Lewis: 50–60% 60–70% 70–80%
U.S. Representative before election
Ron Lewis
Republican
Elected U.S. Representative
Ron Lewis
Republican

Incumbent Republican Congressman Ron Lewis faced no difficulty seeking a fifth term in his conservative district based in west-central Kentucky, riding the coattails of President Bush's re-election in Kentucky over Democratic nominee Adam Smith.

=== Predictions ===
Source	Ranking	As of
The Cook Political Report	Safe R	October 29, 2004
Sabato's Crystal Ball	Safe R	November 1, 2004

=== Results ===
Kentucky's 2nd congressional district election, 2004
Party	Candidate	Votes	%
Republican	Ron Lewis (inc.)	185,394	67.92
Democratic	Adam Smith	87,585	32.08
Total votes		272,979	100.00
Republican hold			

== District 3 ==
2004 Kentucky's 3rd congressional district election
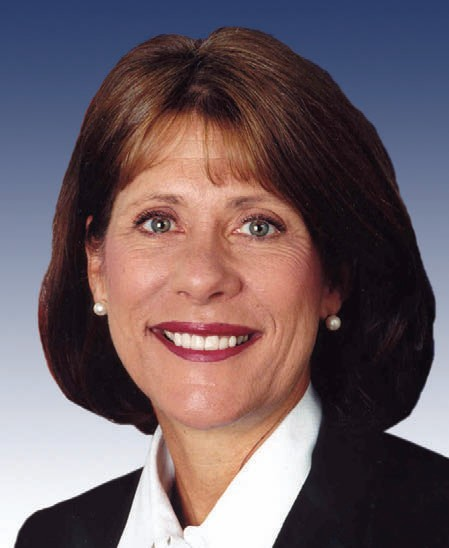

Nominee	Anne Northup	Tony Miller
Party	Republican	Democratic
Popular vote	197,736	124,040
Percentage	60.3%	37.8%
U.S. Representative before election
Anne Northup
Republican
Elected U.S. Representative
Anne Northup
Republican

Incumbent Republican Congresswoman Anne Northup was used to facing tough elections in this swing district based in Louisville, but this election proved different. Despite the fact that John Kerry, the Democratic nominee for president, won Northup's district, her Democratic opponent, Tony Miller, the Circuit Court Clerk for Jefferson County was unable to defeat Northup and his campaign crumbled in a landslide.

=== Predictions ===
Source	Ranking	As of
The Cook Political Report	Lean R	October 29, 2004
Sabato's Crystal Ball	Lean R	November 1, 2004

=== Results ===
Kentucky's 3rd congressional district election, 2004
Party	Candidate	Votes	%
Republican	Anne Northup (inc.)	197,736	60.26
Democratic	Tony Miller	124,040	37.80
Libertarian	George C. Dick	6,363	1.94
Write-ins		15	0.00
Total votes		328,154	100.00
Republican hold			

== District 4 ==
2004 Kentucky's 4th congressional district election
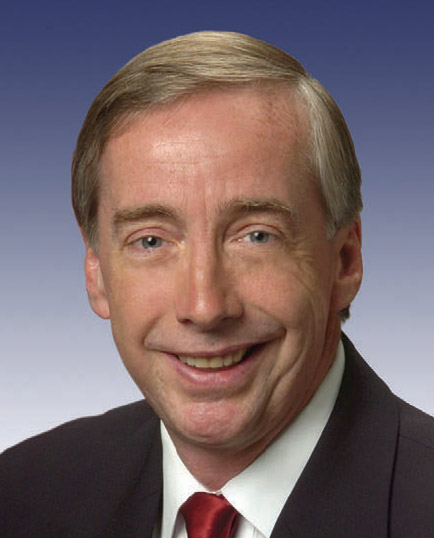

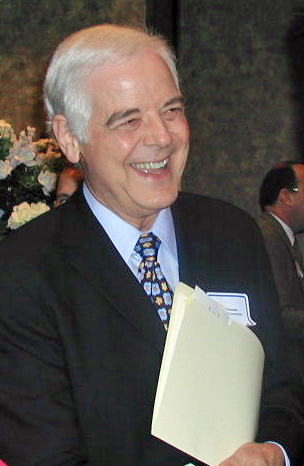
Nominee	Geoff Davis	Nick Clooney
Party	Republican	Democratic
Popular vote	160,982	129,876
Percentage	54.4%	43.9%
- County results Davis: 40–50% 50–60% 60–70% Clooney: 50–60% 60–70% 70–80%
U.S. Representative before election
Ken Lucas
Democratic
Elected U.S. Representative
Geoff Davis
Republican

When incumbent Congressman Ken Lucas, a Democrat, declined to seek re-election as part of a campaign pledge to only serve three terms, an intense battle emerged in this conservative district based in northern Kentucky. Reporter Nick Clooney, the father of renowned actor George Clooney, became the Democratic nominee; Geoff Davis, Lucas's opponent in 2002, became the Republican nominee. In what some dubbed "Heartland vs. Hollywood," Davis rode a Republican tidal wave to victory, defeating Clooney by a fair margin. Michael E. Slider, a High School teacher from Oldham County, also ran in the race as an independent.

=== Predictions ===
Source	Ranking	As of
The Cook Political Report	Tossup	October 29, 2004
Sabato's Crystal Ball	Tilt R (flip)	November 1, 2004

=== Results ===
Kentucky's 4th congressional district election, 2004
Party	Candidate	Votes	%
Republican	Geoff Davis	160,982	54.40
Democratic	Nick Clooney	129,876	43.89
Independent	Michael E. Slider	5,069	1.71
Total votes		295,927	100.00
Republican gain from Democratic			

== District 5 ==
2004 Kentucky's 5th congressional district election
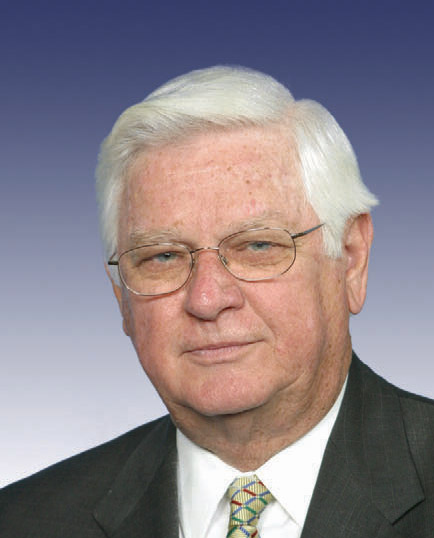
Nominee	Hal Rogers
Party	Republican
Popular vote	177,579
Percentage	100.0%
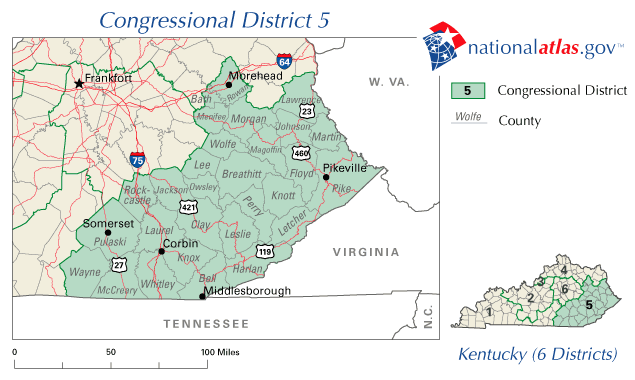
U.S. Representative before election
Hal Rogers
Republican
Elected U.S. Representative
Hal Rogers
Republican

Incumbent Republican Congressman Hal Rogers was unopposed for another term in this strongly conservative district based in East Kentucky.

=== Predictions ===
Source	Ranking	As of
The Cook Political Report	Safe R	October 29, 2004
Sabato's Crystal Ball	Safe R	November 1, 2004

=== Results ===
Kentucky's 5th congressional district election, 2004
Party	Candidate	Votes	%
Republican	Hal Rogers (inc.)	177,579	100.00
Total votes		177,579	100.00
Republican hold			

== District 6 ==
2004 Kentucky's 6th congressional district election
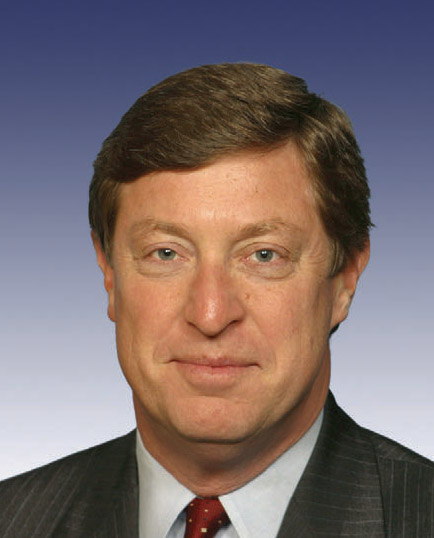

Nominee	Ben Chandler	Tom Buford
Party	Democratic	Republican
Popular vote	175,355	119,716
Percentage	58.6%	40.0%
- County results Chandler: 50–60% 60–70% 70–80% Buford: 50–60% 60–70%
U.S. Representative before election
Ben Chandler
Democratic
Elected U.S. Representative
Ben Chandler
Democratic

Emerging from a successful special election earlier in the year, freshman incumbent Congressman Ben Chandler faced off against the Republican nominee, Kentucky State Senator Tom Buford. Chandler won a second term with relative ease in this conservative Central Kentucky district.

=== Predictions ===
Source	Ranking	As of
The Cook Political Report	Safe D	October 29, 2004
Sabato's Crystal Ball	Safe D	November 1, 2004

=== Results ===
Kentucky's 6th congressional district election, 2004
Party	Candidate	Votes	%
Democratic	Ben Chandler (inc.)	175,355	58.61
Republican	Tom Buford	119,716	40.01
Constitution	Stacy Abner	2,377	0.79
Libertarian	Mark Gailey	1,758	0.59
Total votes		299,206	100.00
Democratic hold			

Preceded by 2002 elections	United States House elections in Kentucky; 2004	Succeeded by 2006 elections
