= Watterson College =

Watterson College was a private, non-accredited bankrupt college that was operated by a Kentucky Corporation with branches in several states, including operations in California from 1987 to 1995. It offered associate degrees and trained students in various entry-level professions such as court reporting, medical assisting, retailing, and paralegal services. The college registered students while it was insolvent. It continued to operate long after administrative dissolution and received federal funding under false pretenses, promising the federal government it was working to fix its accrediting issues, which it never intended on doing and its bankruptcy filing is proof of their ill intent to deceive student borrowers and run away with their money. Watterson College Pacific was fined millions of dollars by the courts for commingling accounts with its parent company called, 'Careercom'. Students of Waterson College Pacific were abruptly shut out by the school when administrators abruptly abandon the property. The government ordered a refund to students.

Watterson College had various satellite campuses and one Branch in California. Although the direct connection cannot be established at this time, there were also Watterson College schools in other cities across the United States, like Louisville, Kentucky. Its main office was located at the Pasadena, California campus, and major campuses include the Van Nuys, California, West Covina and Oxnard campuses. It participated in the California Pell Grant program. During the early 1990s, Watterson College began struggling to meet admission goals, due to increased competition by public institutions, leading to the final closing of all campuses by 1995 though it was already officially closed in 1992 according to State of California and Department of Education records.

Prior to its closing, the school made an effort to preserve its records for any students needing transcripts or educational verification, however not all of the records were preserved. Students from the Pasadena Campus are encouraged to contact North-West College. North-West College became the official "custodian of records" for only the Watterson College alumni who were located at the Pasadena campus. For questions about all other Watterson alumni, contact the California Department of Consumer Affairs.
