= William Natcher =

American politician

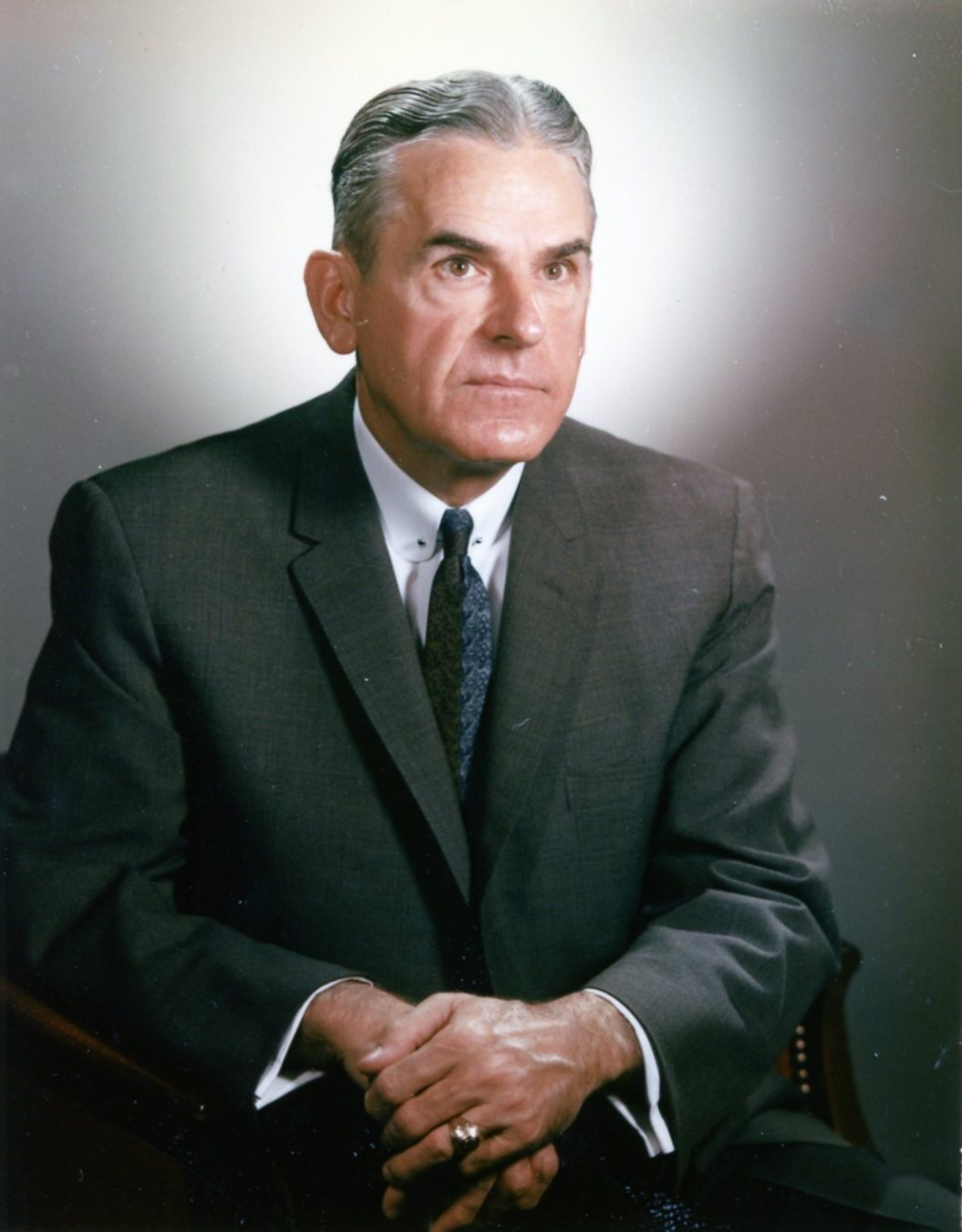
- Natcher c. 1970s

Chair of the House Appropriations Committee
- In office January 3, 1993 – March 29, 1994
- Preceded by: Jamie Whitten
- Succeeded by: Dave Obey

Member of the U.S. House of Representatives from Kentucky's 2nd district
- In office August 1, 1953 – March 29, 1994
- Preceded by: Garrett Withers
- Succeeded by: Ron Lewis

Personal details
- Born: William Houston Natcher; September 11, 1909 Bowling Green, Kentucky, U.S.
- Died: March 29, 1994 (aged 84) Bethesda, Maryland, U.S.
- Party: Democratic
- William Natcher's voice Natcher speaks on FY1989 appropriations for labor, health, and education Recorded June 15, 1988

William Huston Natcher (September 11, 1909 – March 29, 1994) was a Democratic congressman, serving in the United States House of Representatives from 1953 until his death from heart failure in Bethesda, Maryland in 1994. He is the second longest-serving member ever of the United States House of Representatives from the Commonwealth of Kentucky.

== Early life ==
Natcher was born on September 11, 1909, in Bowling Green, Kentucky. Natcher received a Bachelor of Arts degree at Western Kentucky State College (now Western Kentucky University) in Bowling Green in 1930 and an LL.B. from the Ohio State University in Columbus in 1933. Natcher married in 1937, and had two daughters.

Natcher practiced law in Bowling Green. From 1936 to 1937 he was U.S. Conciliation Commissioner for Kentucky's Western District, and he served as Warren County Attorney from 1938 to 1950. Natcher was President of Kentucky's Young Democratic Clubs from 1941 to 1946.

He served in the United States Navy during World War II. From 1951 to 1953 Natcher was Commonwealth's Attorney for Kentucky's Eighth Judicial District.

== Congressional career ==
He was elected as a Democrat to the United States House of Representatives in 1953 from the 2nd district. He cast 18,401 consecutive roll-call votes between 1953 and 1994, never missing a single roll call vote over his forty-one-year Congressional career until his last days in office, the all-time record for both the House of Representatives and Congress as a whole. Natcher refused to accept campaign contributions. He was also chairman of the House Appropriations Committee from 1993 to 1994. His knowledge of House rules in debate led House Speaker Tip O'Neill to employ him as presiding officer during crucial debates.

Natcher did not sign the 1956 Southern Manifesto, and voted in favor of the Civil Rights Acts of 1960 and 1968, as well as the 24th Amendment to the U.S. Constitution and the Voting Rights Act of 1965, but voted against the Civil Rights Acts of 1957 and 1964.

During his tenure, Natcher amassed a mostly liberal voting record. On the day of his last vote, he arrived at the Capitol from Bethesda Naval Hospital by ambulance and was wheeled onto the House floor on a gurney. He missed the first vote of his career the next day, when doctors advised him not to return to the Capitol. He died a few weeks later, never having returned to the House floor again.

Natcher was a pro-highway Congressman, encouraging road projects, including in the District of Columbia. From 1970 to 1973, he repeatedly held up funding for the Washington Metro system, delaying its construction until 1973, when he lost a vote to block Metro funding. Natcher refused to allow federal funding for the Washington DC Metro until Arlington County officials agreed to have I-66 go through North Arlington neighborhoods.

In addition, Natcher sought construction of the controversial Three Sisters Bridge, demanding the project begin construction before funds could be released to WMATA. Eventually, a coalition of Congressmen led by Robert Giaimo circumvented Natcher, preventing construction of the Bridge.

On March 4, 1994, Natcher was presented with the Presidential Citizens Medal by President of the United States Bill Clinton. He continued to serve in Congress until his death on March 29, 1994, in Bethesda, Maryland.

=== Legacy ===
Natcher was a champion of road projects within Kentucky, especially the construction of a cable-stayed bridge between Kentucky and Indiana near Owensboro. Natcher helped get the majority of federal funding for the new bridge, which now carries U.S. Highway 231 across the Ohio River between Maceo, Kentucky and Rockport, Indiana. The William H. Natcher Bridge was named in his honor before he died, although it was not completed until 2002.

Also named in Natcher's honor is Interstate 165, the William H. Natcher Expressway, a Kentucky Interstate highway (formerly a toll road) that runs between Bowling Green and Owensboro. From its 1972 opening until 1997, the road was known as the Green River Parkway, then the William H. Natcher Parkway until the Interstate designation was granted to the road in 2019.

Building 45 of the National Institutes of Health (NIH) in Bethesda, Maryland, is named in his honor.

During his congressional career, Natcher was a passionate believer in libraries and literacy. He fought for continued federal funding for library construction and initiatives. These programs continue today; the Kentucky Library Association presents the William H. Natcher Award annually for acts of philanthropy and support of libraries within the Commonwealth.

== See also ==
- List of members of the United States Congress by longevity of service
- List of members of the United States Congress who died in office (1950–1999)

U.S. House of Representatives
Preceded by Garrett L. Withers	Member of the U.S. House of Representatives from Kentucky's 2nd congressional district 1953–1994	Succeeded by Ron Lewis
Preceded by Jamie Whitten; Mississippi	Chairman of the House Appropriations Committee; 1993–1994	Succeeded by Dave Obey; Wisconsin
