= Louisville Eccentric Observer =

Newspaper in Louisville, Kentucky

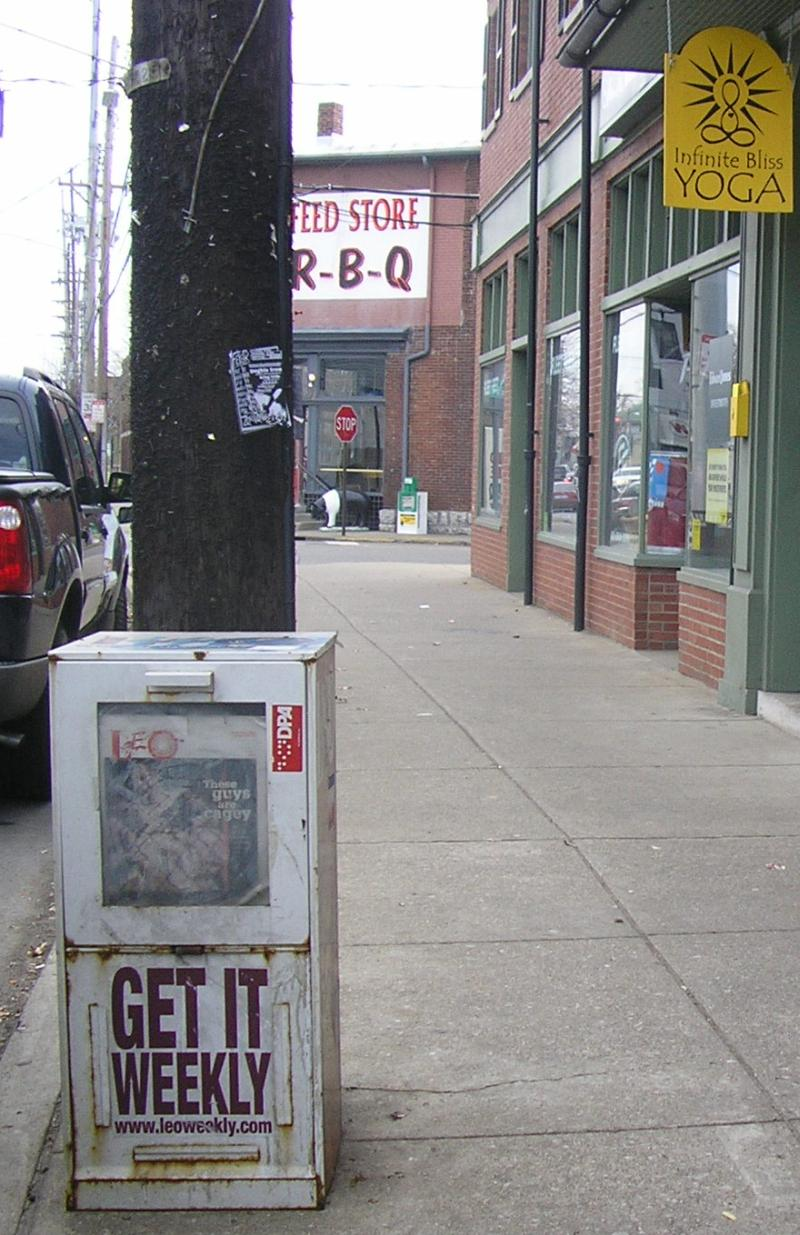
- A LEO distribution location in 2005
- Type: Alternative Newsweekly
- Format: Tabloid
- Owner: Big Lou Holdings LLC
- Editor: n/a
- Associate editor: n/a
- Founded: 1990
- Language: English
- Headquarters: 607 W. Main St. Louisville, KY 40202; US
- Circulation: 25,150
- Price: Free
- Website: leoweekly.com

The Louisville Eccentric Observer (also called LEO Weekly but widely known as just LEO) is a privately owned free urban alternative weekly newspaper, distributed every Wednesday in about 700 locations throughout the Louisville, Kentucky, metropolitan area, including areas of southern Indiana. The newspaper was founded in 1990 by John Yarmuth, Robert Schulman, Denny Crum (then the coach of the University of Louisville men's basketball team), and two other investors.

The paper carries various nationally syndicated columns and features such as News of the Weird and The New York Times crossword puzzle. However, the reviews of music, restaurants, theatre, films, books, and local and sports news, are all written by local writers. In the past, it featured popular columns by national writers Molly Ivins and Dave Barry.

== History ==
The paper was initially devoted to opinion and commentary, with columns by Crum, Schulman, Yarmuth, and former Louisville Courier-Journal writers Mary Cauldwell and Dudley Saunders. The first issue was distributed in July 1990, bi-weekly publication began on November 1 of that year, and weekly publication in April 1993. A free paper, it has always been wholly supported by advertising revenue. Following its conversion to a weekly format in 1993, the LEO began including a more diverse variety of news and reviews.

Since 1992, the LEO has published an annual issue called the Literary LEO, dedicated to locally produced literature, poetry and, more recently, photography.

Since 1995, LEO has been a member of the Association of Alternative Newsweeklies.

In 2003, it was sold to a company owned by Times Publishing Co. of Pennsylvania, owner of the Erie Times-News. Yarmuth remained on board as a columnist and consultant until January 2006, when he declared himself a Democratic candidate for the Kentucky 3rd congressional district race and his column was put on indefinite hold. Yarmuth won the primary and defeated incumbent Republican Rep. Anne Northup, an occasional target of his columns.

In 2008, SouthComm Communications of Nashville, Tennessee, bought the LEO. Following this acquisition, the magazine underwent a style change, introducing a new logo and using coated stock magazine paper rather than newspaper.

In March 2013, the printing of LEO Weekly moved to Gannett Publishing Services in Louisville, and the publication moved back from a coated stock paper to newsprint.

In 2014, LEO was acquired by a group led by Aaron Yarmuth, the son of John Yarmuth.

In June 2021, the LEO was sold to the Euclid Media Group. In August 2023, the company dissolved and the newspaper was sold to Chris Keating, operating under the name Big Lou Holdings LLC.

In January 2025, LEO fired two top editors, leaving it with only three full-time employees.
