= Ken Lucas (politician) =

American politician (born 1933)

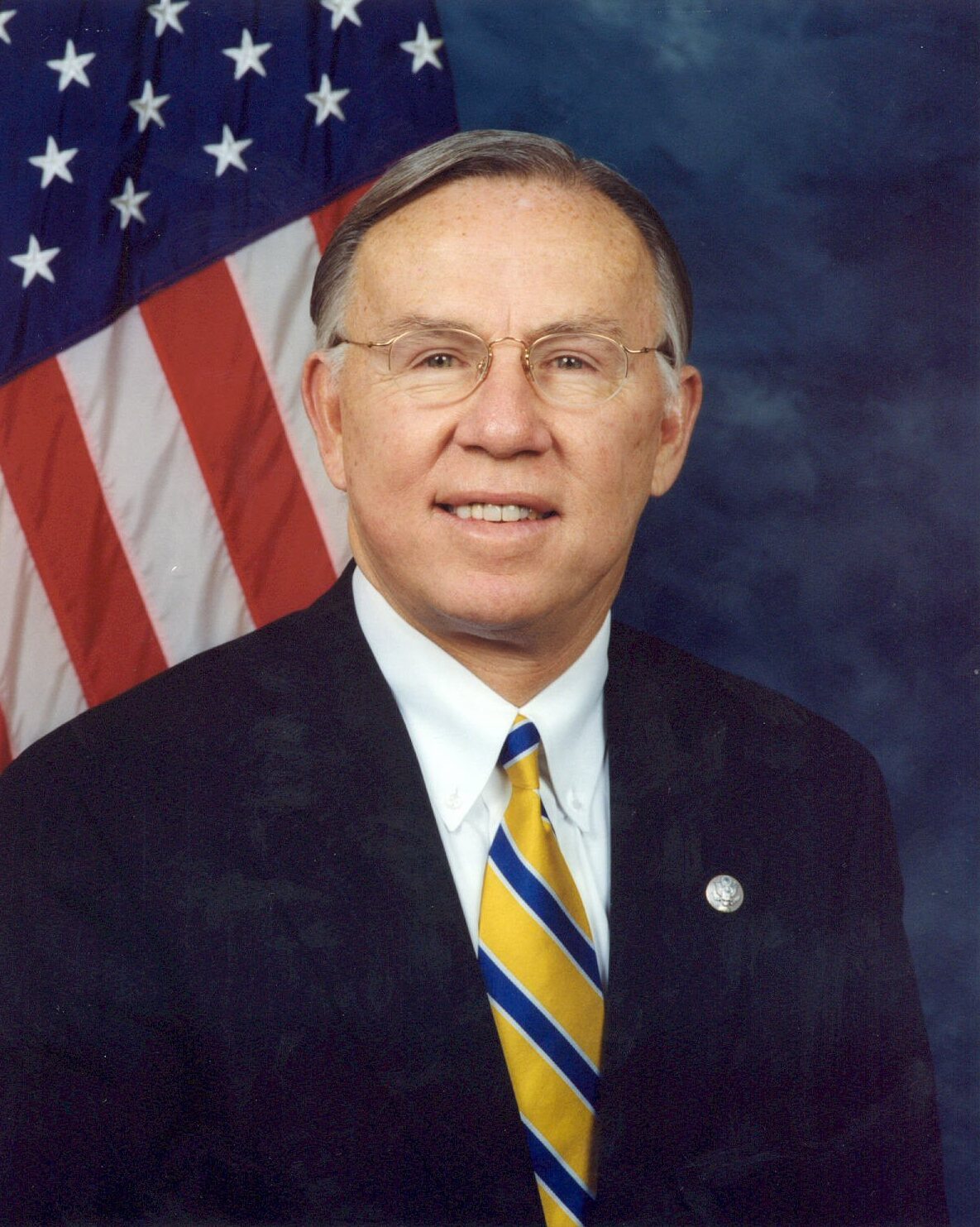

Member of the U.S. House of Representatives from Kentucky's 4th district
- In office January 3, 1999 – January 3, 2005
- Preceded by: Jim Bunning
- Succeeded by: Geoff Davis

Judge/Executive of Boone County
- In office January 1, 1992 – January 4, 1999
- Preceded by: Bruce Ferguson
- Succeeded by: Gary Moore

Personal details
- Born: Kenneth Ray Lucas; August 22, 1933 (age 93) Covington, Kentucky, U.S.
- Party: Democratic
- Spouse: Mary Lucas
- Education: University of Kentucky (BA); Xavier University (MBA)

Kenneth Ray Lucas (born August 22, 1933) is an American politician. A Democrat, he was a U.S. representative from Kentucky's 4th congressional district from 1999 until 2005.

Lucas did not run for reelection in 2004, honoring a promise to serve only three terms. He was succeeded by Republican Geoff Davis, whom he defeated in 2002. However, he ran against Davis in 2006, and lost, winning 43 percent of the vote to Davis's 52 percent.

In 2009, he was appointed as Commissioner of the Kentucky Department of Veterans Affairs by Governor Steve Beshear. He served as Commissioner until 2014, when he stepped down to oversee the opening of a veterans nursing home.

== Life and career ==
Lucas was born in Covington, Kentucky and grew up on a dairy and tobacco farm in Grant County. He attended the University of Kentucky, graduating in 1955. Lucas received his MBA from Xavier University in 1970. He served for 12 years in the Air Force, later serving in the Air National Guard and retiring as a major. He then became a certified financial planner.

From 1967 to 1974, Lucas was a city councilman in Florence; after this, he became a county commissioner in Boone County until 1982. In 1992, he was appointed Boone County judge/executive by governor Brereton Jones following the resignation of incumbent Bruce Ferguson. Lucas won reelection in a special election later that year, and was reelected to a full term in office in 1993. He did not seek reelection in 1998, instead running for the US house.

Lucas' 1998 victory came as something of a surprise even though Democrats have a substantial majority in registration. He was the first Democrat to represent this district since 1967. Due to the influence of the Cincinnati suburbs, it was widely considered one of the most Republican districts in the South. His victory was even more remarkable since six-term incumbent Jim Bunning made a successful run for the Senate in 1998, winning largely by carrying his old district by a margin that Democrat Scotty Baesler couldn't make up in the rest of the state.

Lucas was reelected in 2000 by 12 points even as the district gave George W. Bush his largest victory margin in the state (the territory currently in the district has not supported a Democrat for President since 1964). He had a far closer race in 2002, when Geoff Davis held him to 51 percent.

Lucas opted not to seek reelection in 2004, having promised to serve only three terms (six years) in Congress. He heavily recruited Cincinnati television personality Nick Clooney to run against Davis in his stead, but Davis defeated Clooney 55% to 45%. A member of the Christian Church (Disciples of Christ), Lucas and his wife Mary have five children.

Map of the 2002 election in KY-04, the last time Lucas or any Democrat won the seat Legend: | Lucas 50–60% 60–70% 70–80% 80–90% | Davis 50–60% 60–70% |

== Run for Congress 2006 ==
Local and national Democratic Party leaders recruited Lucas to make a run for his old seat. He formally announced his candidacy on January 30.

Lucas' entry made the race competitive, despite the 4th's Republican bent. Historically, among the Commonwealth's districts, only the 5th district has been more Republican. The influence of the heavily Republican Cincinnati suburbs kept the district in Republican hands from 1967 until Lucas won the seat in 1998. In August Congressional Quarterly rated the race as "Lean Republican." In late July, the Washington Post also rated the race as a toss-up. A SurveyUSA poll released on July 25, 2006, showed Lucas leading 50% to 41%, although Davis has a decisive lead in fundraising.

Lucas ended up losing to Davis by nine points: 43% to 52%. To date, this is the last time that a Democrat has managed 40 percent of the vote.

== A "Blue-Dog" Democrat ==
Lucas was one of the most conservative Democrats in the House, as reflected by National Journal rankings. He had a lifetime American Conservative Union rating of 72, the highest of any Democrat in the 108th Congress. However, he shared most Democrats' wariness about privatizing Social Security. He was asked several times to switch parties and become a Republican, but rebuffed these overtures each time.

In a district with a strong social conservative bent, Lucas won his three terms by stressing his conservative social views. He is anti-abortion, pro-gun and against gay marriage. He supported President Bush's tax cuts while in Congress and also voted in favor of going to war in Iraq. He identified as a "Blue Dog Democrat." This comes from the old (Southern) phrase of "Yellow dog Democrats" — people who would vote Democrat even if a yellow dog was the nominee. To distance themselves from attacks (such as being too liberal), they formed the coalition.

U.S. House of Representatives
| Preceded by Jim Bunning | Member of the U.S. House of Representatives from Kentucky's 4th congressional district 1999–2005 | Succeeded by Geoff Davis |
U.S. order of precedence (ceremonial)
| Preceded by Scotty Baesler as Former U.S. Representative | Order of precedence of the United States as Former U.S. Representative | Succeeded by Stephen Fincher as Former U.S. Representative |
