= Ron Lewis =

American politician (born 1946)

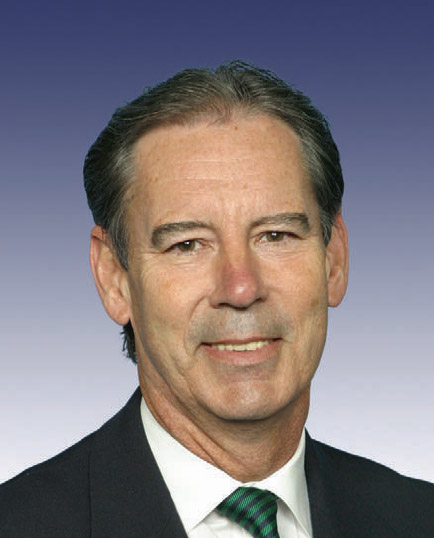

Member of the U.S. House of Representatives from Kentucky's 2nd district
- In office May 24, 1994 – January 3, 2009 (Note: Lewis's official service begins on the date of the special election, while he was not sworn in until May 26, 1994.)
- Preceded by: William Natcher
- Succeeded by: Brett Guthrie

Personal details
- Born: Ronald Edward Lewis; September 14, 1946 (age 79) McKell, Kentucky, U.S.
- Party: Republican
- Spouse: Kayi Gambill (m. 1966)
- Education: University of Kentucky (BA); Morehead State University (MA)

Ronald Edward Lewis (born September 14, 1946) is an American retired politician who was a Republican member of the United States House of Representatives from 1994 to 2009, having represented the 2nd congressional district of Kentucky.

Lewis announced on January 29, 2008, that he would not run for an eighth term.

== Early life, education, and career ==
Lewis was born in McKell near South Shore in Greenup County in far northeastern Kentucky. He graduated in 1964 from McKell High School. He attended Morehead State University in Morehead in Rowan County from 1964 to 1967 and graduated from the University of Kentucky at Lexington in 1969 with a Bachelor of Arts degree in history and political science. Lewis returned to Morehead in 1980 to earn a master's degree in professional education in 1981.

At twenty-one, Lewis worked in the 1967 gubernatorial campaign of Louie B. Nunn of Glasgow. Nunn's victory got Lewis a state job for a time and encouragement to run in 1971 for the Kentucky House of Representatives in his native Greenup County. Though he lost the legislative race in a Democratic year in Kentucky, Lewis maintained an interest in GOP politics. In 1972, Lewis served briefly in the U.S. Navy, attending the Navy Officer Candidate School in Pensacola, Florida; a kidney ailment resulted in a quick medical discharge.

Lewis worked in sales for several companies, including Ashland Oil, before teaching for five years at Watterson College in Louisville, Kentucky, having begun in 1980. (The school closed in the 1990s.) He also was ordained as a Southern Baptist minister in 1980, having served as pastor for the historic White Mills Baptist Church, after attending the Southern Baptist Theological Seminary in Louisville. In 1985 Lewis opened a religious bookstore, Alpha and Omega Bookstore, in Elizabethtown. In the early 1980s, he was a pastor at Friendship Baptist Church, located outside Hodgenville.

Lewis has been married to Kayi Gambill Lewis since 1966. They live in Cecilia, near Elizabethtown, and have two children. He is a Southern Baptist.

== Congressional career ==
=== 1994 election ===
In 1994, Lewis filed to run against longtime Democratic Representative William H. Natcher in the general election in November 1994. The Second District was predominantly Democratic in terms of voter registration, and Natcher had held the seat without serious difficulty since 1953. Although Lewis had been personally endorsed by the state GOP leadership and Senator Mitch McConnell, he was considered somewhat of a "sacrificial lamb" candidate.

The dimensions of the race changed dramatically when Natcher died in late March 1994. A special election was called in May 1994 to replace him. In the special election, Lewis faced Joe Prather, a state senator from Hardin County. Lewis got support from numerous national Republican sources and many social conservative groups, enabling him to run a very strong campaign in a district that had not elected a Republican in 129 years. Lewis tied Prather to an unpopular Bill Clinton and a proposal to raise taxes on tobacco, the staple crop of the state. He also took advantage of the socially conservative tilt of the Second District.

In the special election Lewis defeated Prather by 55-45 percent in an election with less than 20 percent turnout—a result which is still considered a major upset. It was a result that many political pundits, as Larry J. Sabato noted in his Crystal Ball newsletter, saw as a harbinger of the Republican gains in Congress in the regular election later that year. Lewis was elected to a full term that November, when he defeated Democrat David Adkisson with 60 percent of the vote.

One of the centerpieces of Lewis' 1994 campaign was term limits in Washington. He was one of five Republicans who signed a pledge committing themselves to a limited number of terms if elected. He himself had promised to leave the House in 2003, after serving four full terms plus the last seven months of Natcher's term. In 1998, Lewis sent a letter to 3,000 constituents in 1998 informing them he had changed his mind about running in 2002 and beyond. "I made a mistake in 1994, and I admit that. I had said I would not run past 2002," he told the Elizabethtown News Enterprise in October 1998.

=== Political positions ===
According to the non-partisan website TheMiddleClass.org, Ron Lewis has consistently voted against tax increases and expansion of social programs.

In 2004, Lewis joined numerous Republican colleagues in sponsoring legislation that would allow lawmakers to override certain Supreme Court decisions by a two-thirds vote of the House and Senate. Lewis likened his proposal to the existing right of Congress to override a presidential veto with a two-thirds majority.

=== 1996–2004 campaigns ===
Lewis won a second full term in 1996 with 58 percent of the vote by beating former Kentucky Senate floor leader Joe Wright with a vote total of 125,433 to 90,483. He did not face another serious challenge until 2006. In the 2004 election, he defeated Democrat Adam Smith, getting 68 percent of the vote.

=== 2006 ===
In the 2006 election, Lewis defeated retired U.S. Army Colonel Mike Weaver, a former member of the Kentucky House of Representatives. Weaver gave Lewis his first credible challenge in a decade, holding him to only 55 percent of the vote.

=== Committee assignments ===
- Ways and Means Committee
  - Subcommittee on Social Security
  - Subcommittee on Trade
- Republican Policy Committee

== Retirement ==
On January 29, 2008, Lewis announced he would not seek reelection in 2008 on the same day as the filing deadline; he was hoping to ensure the GOP nomination would be won by his chief of staff, Daniel London, but State Senator Brett Guthrie also filed for the race. The decision shocked and angered many prominent Kentucky Republicans, Lewis said he was tired of splitting his time between Washington and Kentucky and that serving in Congress had not been as encouraging since Democrats gained the majority in 2007.

On the Democratic side, State Senator David Boswell of Daviess County and the Daviess County Judge-Executive Reid Haire both filed. Guthrie emerged the winner over primary rival Daniel London and then Boswell.

In 2010, Lewis announced his support for Kentucky Secretary of State Trey Grayson in the race to fill the United States Senate seat of retiring Republican Senator Jim Bunning. Grayson lost the nomination to the eventual Senate winner, Republican Rand Paul.

Lewis deposited his congressional papers at Baptist-affiliated Campbellsville University.

U.S. House of Representatives
Preceded by William H. Natcher	Member of the U.S. House of Representatives from Kentucky's 2nd congressional district 1994–2004	Succeeded by Brett Guthrie
U.S. order of precedence (ceremonial)
Preceded by Bob Etheridge as Former U.S. Representative	Order of precedence of the United States as Former U.S. Representative	Succeeded by Bob Clement as Former U.S. Representative
