= Geoff Davis =

American politician (born 1958)

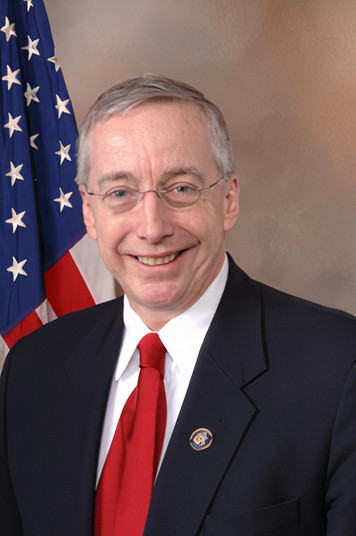
- Official portrait, 2009

Member of the U.S. House of Representatives from Kentucky's 4th district
- In office January 3, 2005 – July 31, 2012
- Preceded by: Ken Lucas
- Succeeded by: Thomas Massie

Personal details
- Born: Geoffrey Clark Davis; October 26, 1958 (age 67) Montreal, Quebec, Canada
- Party: Republican
- Spouse: Pat Davis
- Education: United States Military Academy (BS)
- Occupation: Manufacturing consultant

Military service
- Branch/service: United States Army
- Years of service: 1976–1987
- Rank: Captain
- Commands: 82nd Combat Aviation Battalion; 311th Aviation Battalion

Geoffrey Clark Davis (born October 26, 1958) is an American businessman, politician and former U.S. representative for Kentucky's 4th congressional district, serving from 2005 to 2012. He is a member of the Republican Party. The district included 24 counties in the northeastern part of the state, stretching from the fringes of the Louisville area to the West Virginia border. Most of its vote, however, is cast in the counties bordering Cincinnati. On December 15, 2011, Davis announced he would not seek reelection in 2012. On July 31, 2012, he announced his resignation from Congress effective immediately.

== Early life, education, and business career ==
Davis was born in Montreal, Quebec, Canada to American parents. After graduating from high school, he enlisted in the United States Army and later received an appointment to the United States Military Academy at West Point. At West Point, Davis studied national security and international affairs, as well as the Arabic language. In the U.S. Army he served as an aviation officer, eventually becoming an Assault Helicopter Flight Commander in the 82nd Airborne Division. Davis also ran U.S. Army aviation operations for peace enforcement between Israel and Egypt. During his U.S. Army career, he attained both Senior Parachutist and Ranger qualification.

Before running for the U.S. House of Representatives, he owned a consulting firm specializing in lean manufacturing and systems integration.

== U.S. House of Representatives ==
=== Elections ===
==== 2002 ====
In the 2002 elections, Davis challenged Ken Lucas, the Democratic incumbent but was narrowly defeated 51%–48%.

==== 2004 ====
Lucas declined to run for re-election, honoring a promise to serve only three terms. In the 2004 race for the open seat, Davis defeated his Democratic opponent Nick Clooney, father of actor George Clooney, 54%–44%.

==== 2006 ====
On January 30, 2006, Lucas announced he would challenge Davis later that year. The announcement instantly turned the race into one of the hottest in the campaign cycle, even though the 4th is considered one of the most Republican districts in Kentucky. Despite a substantial Democratic advantage in voter registration, the influence of the heavily Republican northern Kentucky suburbs kept the district in Republican hands from 1967 until Lucas won the seat in 1998. In August Congressional Quarterly rated this race as "Lean Republican." In late July the Washington Post also rated the race as a toss-up. A SurveyUSA poll released on July 25, 2006, showed Lucas leading 50% to 41%. However, Davis regained the lead in a SurveyUSA poll later in the cycle (46% Davis – 44% Lucas). Davis also had a decisive lead in fundraising. The Cook Political Report, an independent non-partisan newsletter, rated the race for Kentucky's 4th Congressional District as a "Republican Toss-Up", meaning either party has a good chance of winning.

Davis won re-election 52%–43%, a margin of 17,023 votes. To date, this is the last time a Democrat has managed as much as 40 percent of the district's vote.

==== 2008 ====
Davis won re-election with 63% of the vote, defeating Michael Kelley.

==== 2010 ====
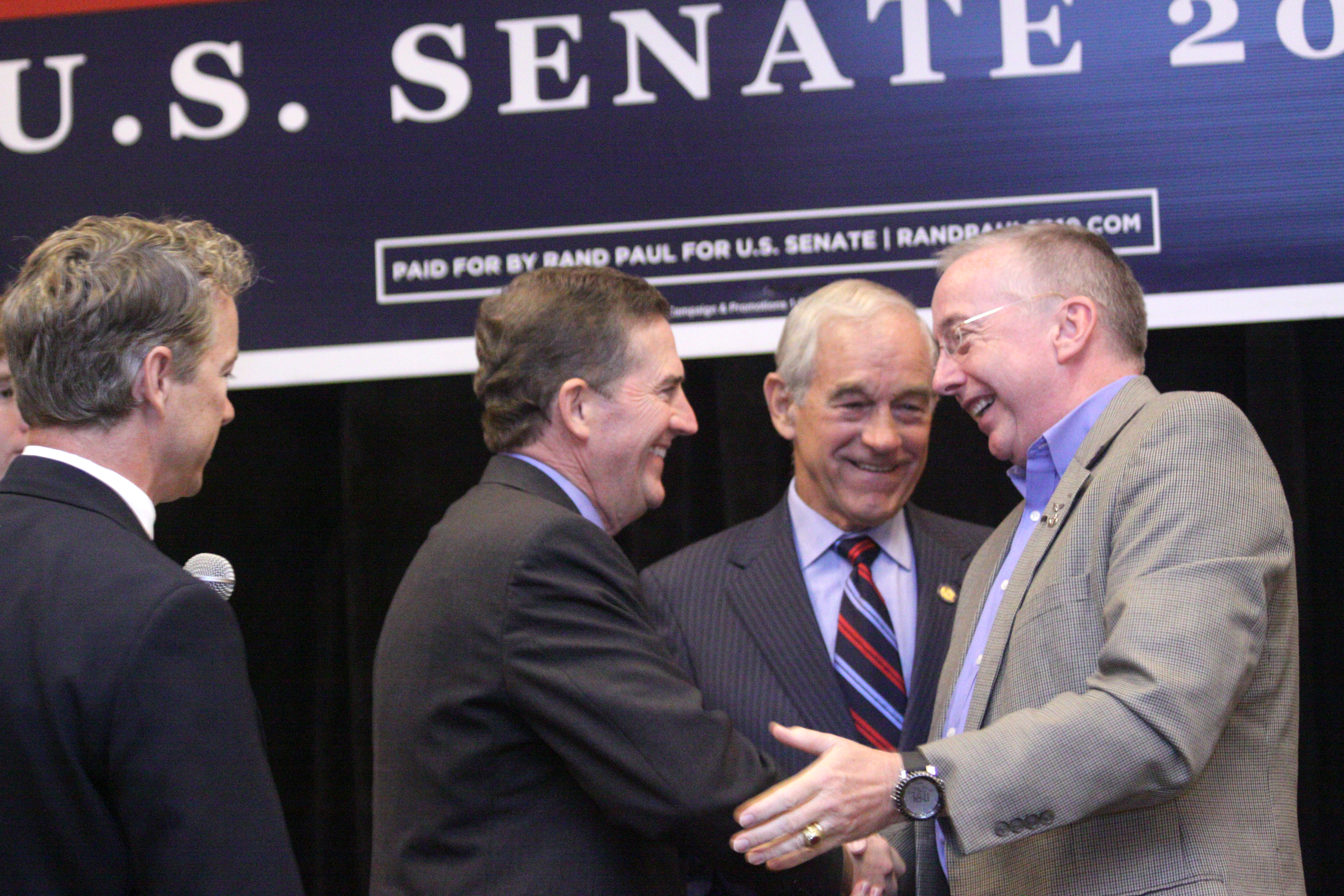
Davis campaigning with Rand Paul, Sen. Jim DeMint and Rep. Ron Paul in 2010

Davis was challenged by Democrat John Waltz, whom he defeated with 69% of the votes cast.

=== Tenure ===
Davis has a solidly conservative voting record; according to his congressional website, he has positioned himself as pro-life and in favor of industrial deregulation.

In November 2005, Davis made headlines for his response to Pennsylvania representative John Murtha's call for withdrawal from Iraq, saying, "Ayman Zawahiri, Osama bin Laden's deputy, as well as Abu Musab Zarqawi, have made it quite clear in their internal propaganda that they cannot win unless they can drive the Americans out. And they know that they can't do that there, so they've brought the battlefield to the halls of Congress. And, frankly, the liberal leadership have put politics ahead of sound, fiscal and national security policy. And what they have done is cooperated with our enemies and are emboldening our enemies." Davis faced harsh criticism for his remarks, including, for example, from the Democratic Veterans of Northern Kentucky, and sparked a drive led by national Democratic Party leaders to get Ken Lucas to run against him in 2006.

Davis is a staunch advocate of a federal prohibition of online poker. In 2006, he supported H.R. 4411, the Goodlatte-Leach Internet Gambling Prohibition Act. In 2008, he opposed H.R. 5767, the Payment Systems Protection Act (a bill that sought to place a moratorium on enforcement of the Unlawful Internet Gambling Enforcement Act while the U.S. Treasury Department and the Federal Reserve defined "unlawful Internet gambling").

In October 2009, Davis filed the REINS (Regulations from the Executive In Need of Scrutiny) Act which would give Congress an up or down vote on major rules. A re-introduced version of the bill passed the House on December 7, 2011, but was not taken up by the Senate.

In 2011, Davis voted for the National Defense Authorization Act for Fiscal Year 2012 as part of a controversial provision that allows the government and the military to indefinitely detain American citizens and others without trial.

==== Contributors ====
The Davis campaign has received contributions from the Americans for a Republican Majority Political Action Committee (ARMPAC), which was led by former Texas Congressman Tom DeLay. As of June 30, 2006, according to the Federal Election Commission, of the $2.4 million contributed to the Davis campaign for the current 2006 electoral cycle, $10,000 was contributed by ARMPAC. Tom DeLay is the subject of indictments sought by Ronnie Earle, the district attorney for Travis County, Texas, alleging violations of Texas campaign-finance law. Judge Pat Priest has dismissed one indictment against DeLay, the second has not yet come to trial. The charges against DeLay are considered by some to be politically motivated. Democrats have indicated that they consider the ARMPAC contributions to be a campaign issue. Davis was never accused of any misconduct.

Davis has received donations from Republican Duke Cunningham, who pleaded guilty to federal charges of conspiracy to commit bribery, mail fraud, wire fraud, and tax evasion. Davis has not chosen to give back the money from Cunningham, while many other recipients have. Davis received a donation from Congressman Bob Ney, who pleaded guilty for bribery and his involvement with convicted felon Jack Abramoff.

==== Controversies ====
On April 12, 2008, at a Northern Kentucky Lincoln Day dinner, Davis compared the campaign slogans of Barack Obama to the sales pitch of a "snake oil salesman". He said in his remarks at the GOP dinner that he participated in a "highly classified, national security simulation" with Obama.

"I'm going to tell you something: That boy's finger does not need to be on the button," Davis added. "He could not make a decision in that simulation that related to a nuclear threat to this country."

Davis also made reference to Obama as being put into the Senate by someone who will probably spend many years of his life in prison (presumably a reference to Tony Rezko) and that Obama had never had a real job before.

Davis later apologized for his comment in a letter:

Dear Senator Obama:

On Saturday night I gave a speech in which I used a poor choice of words when discussing the national security policy positions of the Presidential candidates. I was quoted as saying "That boy's finger does not need to be on the button."

My poor choice of words is regrettable and was in no way meant to impugn you or your integrity. I offer my sincere apology to you and ask for your forgiveness.

Though we may disagree on many issues, I know that we share the goal of a prosperous, secure future for our nation. My comment has detracted from the dialogue that we should all be having on legitimate policy differences and in no way reflects the personal and professional respect I have for you.

Sincerely,

Geoff Davis

==== Resignation ====
On July 31, 2012, Geoff Davis resigned from Congress due to family health issues, effective immediately. Governor Steve Beshear called for a special election to fill the seat to occur the same day as the general election in November, which would allow the winner to be sworn in immediately.

=== Committee assignments ===
- Committee on Ways and Means
  - Subcommittee on Trade
  - Subcommittee on Select Revenue Measures

U.S. House of Representatives
Preceded by Ken Lucas	Member of the U.S. House of Representatives from Kentucky's 4th congressional district 2005–2012	Succeeded by Thomas Massie
