= 2012 United States House of Representatives elections in Kentucky =

- November 6, 2012

All 6 Kentucky seats to the United States House of Representatives
	Majority party	Minority party
Party	Republican	Democratic
Last election	4	2
Seats won	5	1
Seat change	▲1	▼1
Popular vote	1,027,582	684,744
Percentage	58.87%	39.23%
Swing	▼3.48%	▲1.84%

Republican
40–50%
50–60%
60–70%
70–80%
80–90%
90–100%
Democratic
40–50%
50–60%
60–70%

The 2012 United States House of Representatives elections in Kentucky were held on Tuesday, November 6, 2012, to elect the six U.S. representatives from the state of Kentucky, one from each of the state's six congressional districts. The elections coincided with the elections of other federal and state offices, including a quadrennial presidential election. Primary elections were held on May 22, 2012.

== Overview ==
United States House of Representatives elections in Kentucky, 2012
Party	Votes	Percentage	Seats	+/–
Republican	1,027,582	58.87%	5	+1
Democratic	684,744	39.23%	1	-1
Libertarian	4,914	0.28%	0	—
Others	28,137	1.61%	0	—
Totals	1,745,377	100.00%	6	—

== Redistricting ==
Redistricting legislation was passed by both houses of the Kentucky General Assembly and signed into law by Governor Steve Beshear on February 10, 2012.

== District 1 ==
2012 Kentucky's 1st congressional district election
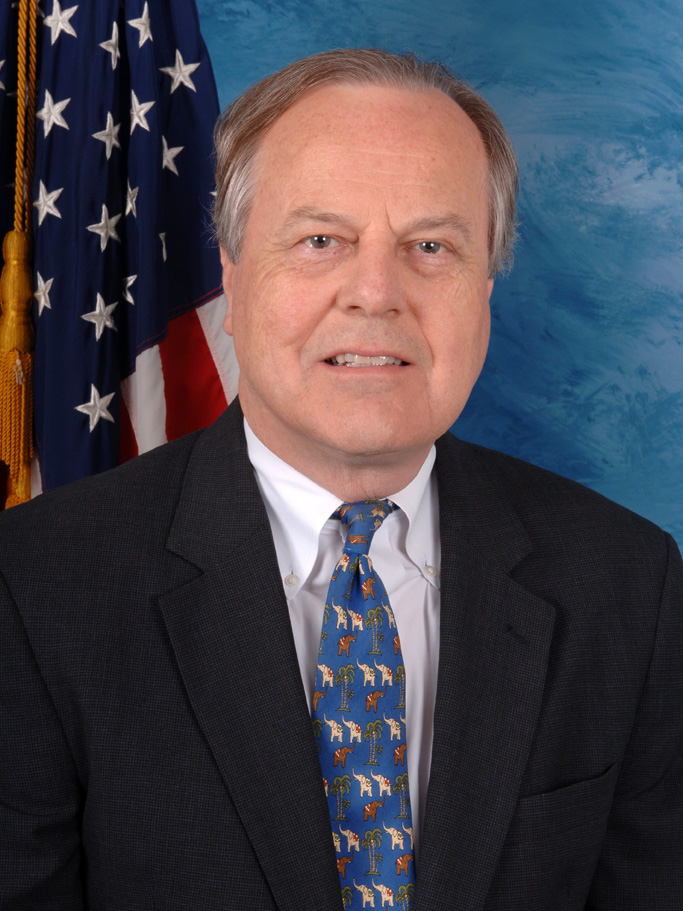

Nominee	Ed Whitfield	Charles Hatchett
Party	Republican	Democratic
Popular vote	199,956	87,199
Percentage	69.6%	30.4%
- County results Whitfield: 60–70% 70–80% 80–90% Hatchett: 50–60%
U.S. Representative before election
Ed Whitfield
Republican
Elected U.S. Representative
Ed Whitfield
Republican

Republican Ed Whitfield, who had represented the 1st district since 1995, ran for re-election. In redistricting, the 1st district was made slightly more competitive, but continues to strongly favor Republicans.

=== Republican primary ===
==== Candidates ====
===== Nominee =====
- Ed Whitfield, incumbent U.S. Representative

=== Democratic primary ===
==== Candidates ====
===== Nominee =====
- Charles Kendall Hatchett, real estate broker and nominee for this seat in 2010

===== Eliminated in primary =====
- James Buckmaster

===== Declined =====
- Brent Yonts, state representative

==== Primary results ====
Democratic primary results
Party	Candidate	Votes	%
Democratic	Charles Kendall Hatchett	19,127	59.1
Democratic	James Buckmaster	13,239	40.9
Total votes		32,366	100.0

=== General election ===
==== Predictions ====
Source	Ranking	As of
The Cook Political Report	Safe R	November 5, 2012
Rothenberg	Safe R	November 2, 2012
Roll Call	Safe R	November 4, 2012
Sabato's Crystal Ball	Safe R	November 5, 2012
NY Times	Safe R	November 4, 2012
RCP	Safe R	November 4, 2012
The Hill	Safe R	November 4, 2012

==== Results ====
Kentucky's 1st congressional district, 2012
Party	Candidate	Votes	%
Republican	Ed Whitfield (incumbent)	199,956	69.6
Democratic	Charles Kendall Hatchett	87,199	30.4
Total votes		287,155	100.0
Republican hold			

== District 2 ==
2012 Kentucky's 2nd congressional district election
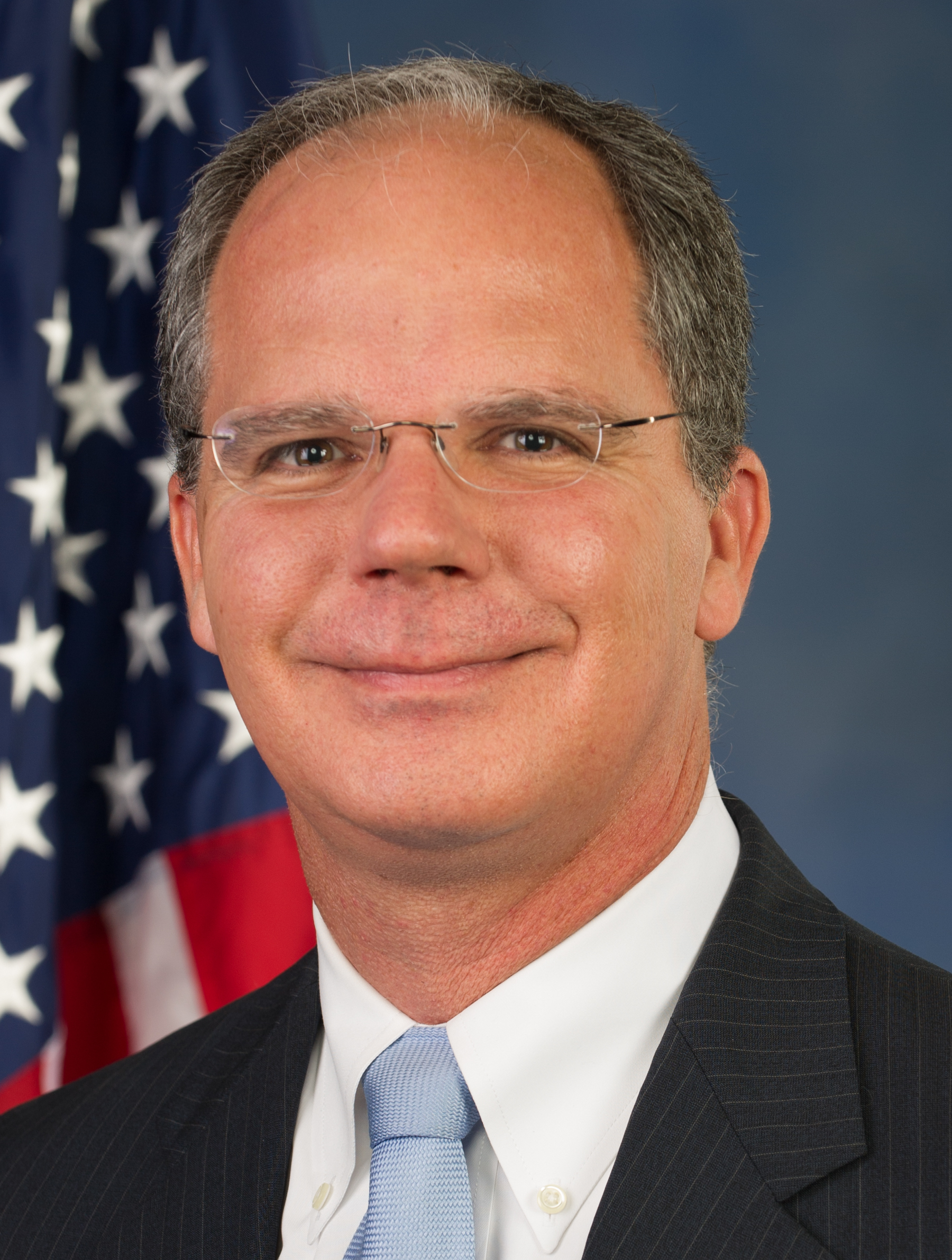

Nominee	Brett Guthrie	David Williams
Party	Republican	Democratic
Popular vote	181,508	89,541
Percentage	64.3%	31.7%
- County results Guthrie: 50–60% 60–70% 70–80%
U.S. Representative before election
Brett Guthrie
Republican
Elected U.S. Representative
Brett Guthrie
Republican

Republican Brett Guthrie, who had represented the 2nd district since 2009, ran for re-election. In redistricting, the 2nd district was made slightly more favourable to Republicans.

=== Republican primary ===
==== Candidates ====
===== Nominee =====
- Brett Guthrie, incumbent U.S. Representative

=== Democratic primary ===
==== Candidates ====
===== Nominee =====
- David Lynn Williams, perennial candidate

===== Declined =====
- Elaine Walker, former Secretary of State of Kentucky

=== Libertarian primary ===
Craig Astor ran as a Libertarian:

=== General election ===
==== Predictions ====
Source	Ranking	As of
The Cook Political Report	Safe R	November 5, 2012
Rothenberg	Safe R	November 2, 2012
Roll Call	Safe R	November 4, 2012
Sabato's Crystal Ball	Safe R	November 5, 2012
NY Times	Safe R	November 4, 2012
RCP	Safe R	November 4, 2012
The Hill	Safe R	November 4, 2012

==== Results ====
Kentucky's 2nd congressional district, 2012
Party	Candidate	Votes	%
Republican	Brett Guthrie (incumbent)	181,508	64.3
Democratic	David Lynn Williams	89,541	31.7
Independent	Andrew R. Beacham	6,304	2.2
Libertarian	Craig R. Astor	4,914	1.8
Total votes		282,267	100.0
Republican hold			

== District 3 ==
2012 Kentucky's 3rd congressional district election
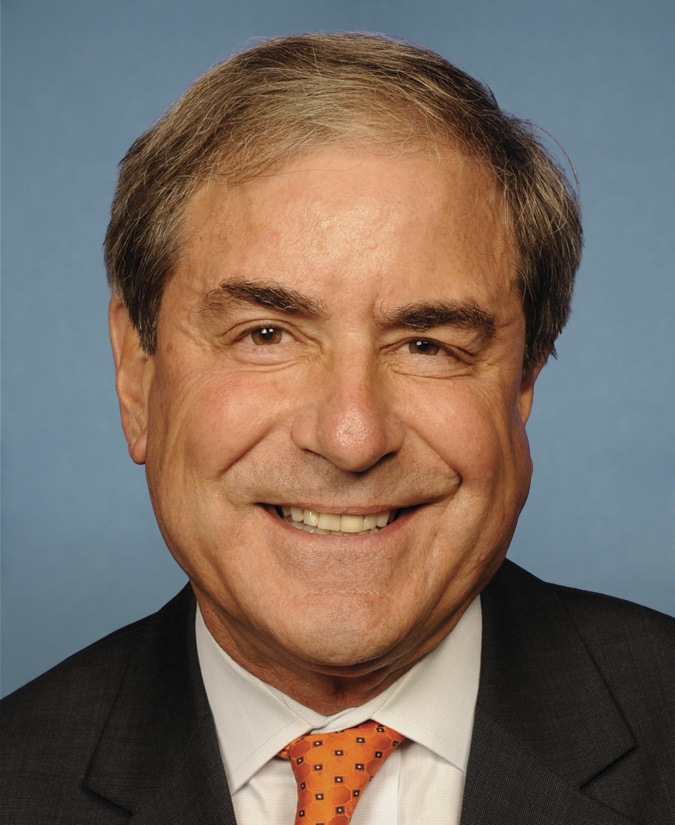

Nominee	John Yarmuth	Brooks Wicker
Party	Democratic	Republican
Popular vote	206,385	111,452
Percentage	64.0%	34.5%
- County result Yarmuth: 60–70%
U.S. Representative before election
John Yarmuth
Democratic
Elected U.S. Representative
John Yarmuth
Democratic

Democrat John Yarmuth, who had represented the 3rd district since 2007, ran for re-election. The 3rd district was made more favorable to Democrats in redistricting.

=== Democratic primary ===
==== Candidates ====
===== Nominee =====
- John Yarmuth, incumbent U.S. Representative

===== Eliminated in primary =====
- Burrel Charles Farnsley, perennial candidate

==== Primary results ====
Democratic primary results
Party	Candidate	Votes	%
Democratic	John Yarmuth (incumbent)	43,635	86.7
Democratic	Burrel Charles Farnsley	6,716	13.3
Total votes		50,351	100.0

=== Republican primary ===
==== Candidates ====
===== Nominee =====
- Brooks Wicker, financial advisor and candidate for this seat in 2010

=== General election ===
==== Predictions ====
Source	Ranking	As of
The Cook Political Report	Safe D	November 5, 2012
Rothenberg	Safe D	November 2, 2012
Roll Call	Safe D	November 4, 2012
Sabato's Crystal Ball	Safe D	November 5, 2012
NY Times	Safe D	November 4, 2012
RCP	Safe D	November 4, 2012
The Hill	Safe D	November 4, 2012

==== Results ====
Kentucky's 3rd congressional district, 2012
Party	Candidate	Votes	%
Democratic	John Yarmuth (incumbent)	206,385	64.0
Republican	Brooks Wicker	111,452	34.5
Independent	Robert L. DeVore, Jr.	4,819	1.5
Total votes		322,656	100.0
Democratic hold			

== District 4 ==
2012 Kentucky's 4th congressional district elections
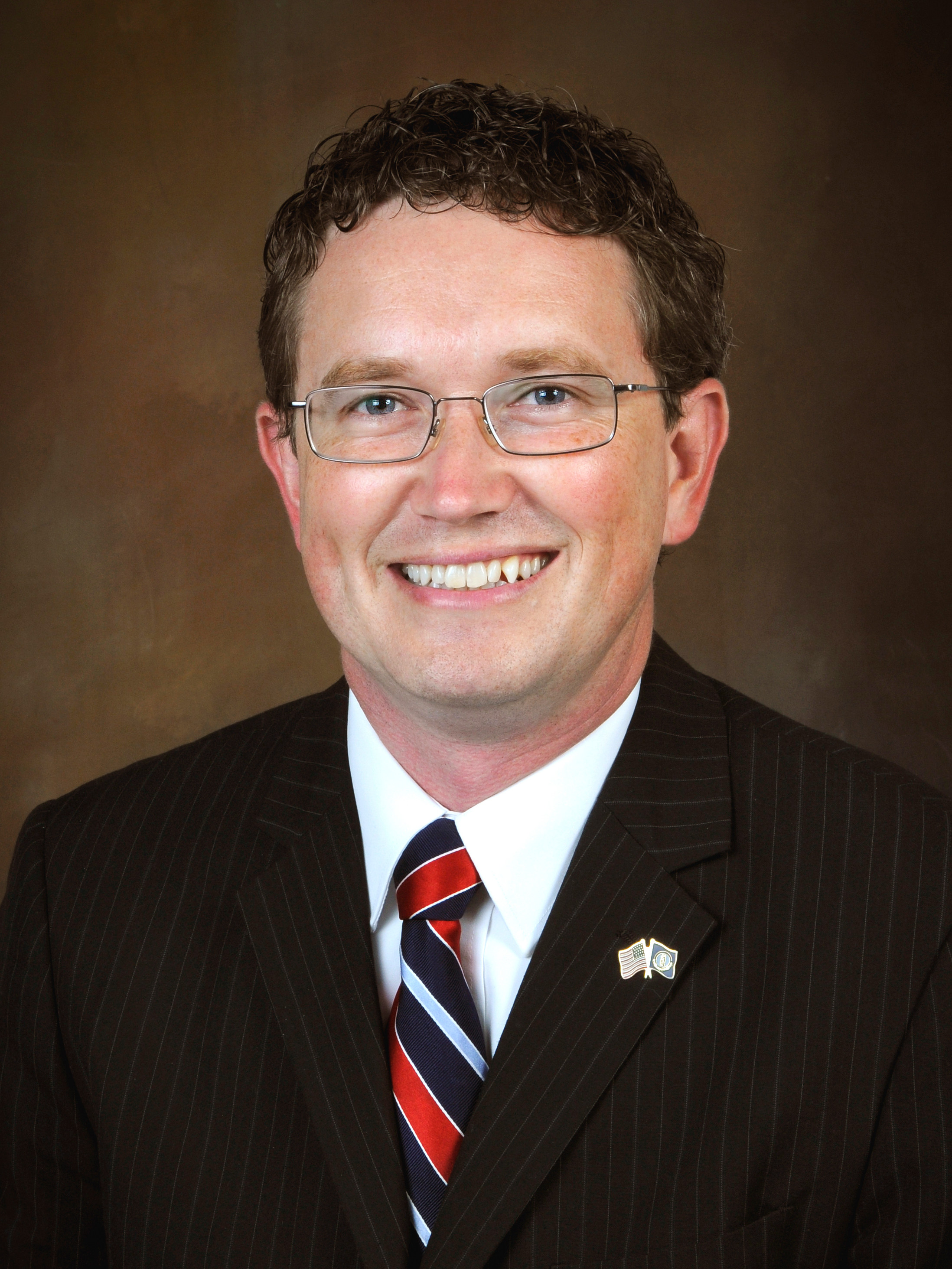

Nominee	Thomas Massie	Bill Adkins
Party	Republican	Democratic
General election popular vote	186,036; 62.1%	104,734; 35.0%
Special election popular vote	174,092; 59.9%	106,598; 36.7%
- Massie: 40–50% 50–60% 60–70% 70–80% Adkins: 40–50% 50–60% 70–80%
U.S. Representative before election
Geoff Davis
Republican
Elected U.S. Representative
Thomas Massie
Republican

Republican Geoff Davis, who had represented 4th district from 2005 to 2012, resigned due to family health issues. In redistricting, the 4th district was made more favorable to Republicans.

=== Republican primary ===
==== Candidates ====
===== Nominee =====
- Thomas Massie, Lewis County judge-executive

===== Eliminated in primary =====
- Walt Schumm, building contractor
- Marcus Carey, lawyer and blogger
- Gary Moore, Boone County judge-executive
- Brian Oerther, teacher
- Alecia Webb-Edgington, state representative
- Tom Wurtz, business consultant

===== Declined =====
- Hunter Bates, former chief of staff to Senator Mitch McConnell
- Kenny Brown, Boone County Clerk
- Ben Dusing, lawyer and former assistant U.S. Attorney
- Trey Grayson, former Secretary of State of Kentucky
- Adam Koenig, state representative
- K. Lance Lucas, lawyer and son of former Democratic U.S. Representative Ken Lucas
- Rick Robinson, aide to former senator Jim Bunning
- Kevin Sell, businessman
- Katie Stine, President Pro Tempore of the Kentucky Senate
- Damon Thayer, state senator

==== Primary results ====
2012 Republican primary results by county: Massie: 30–40%; 40–50%; 50–60%; Webb-Edgington: 40–50%

Republican primary results
Party	Candidate	Votes	%
Republican	Thomas Massie	19,689	44.8
Republican	Alecia Webb-Edgington	12,557	28.6
Republican	Gary Moore	6,521	14.8
Republican	Walter Christian Schumm	3,514	8.0
Republican	Marc Carey	783	1.8
Republican	Tom Wurtz	598	1.4
Republican	Brian D. Oerther	257	0.6
Total votes		43,919	100.0

=== Democratic primary ===
==== Candidates ====
===== Nominee =====
- Bill Adkins, lawyer and chair of the Grant County Democratic Party

===== Eliminated in primary =====
- Greg Frank, military veteran

===== Declined =====
- Kenny French, former Gallatin County Judge-Executive
- Patrick Hughes, attorney
- Linda Klembara, president of the Kentucky Women's Network
- Darrell Link, Grant County Judge-Executive
- Ken Rechtin, Campbell County Commissioner
- Nathan Smith, vice chairman of the Kentucky Democratic Party
- Diane Whalen, Mayor of Florence

==== Primary results ====
Democratic primary results
Party	Candidate	Votes	%
Democratic	Bill Adkins	17,209	68.6
Democratic	Greg Frank	7,869	31.4
Total votes		25,078	100.0

=== Special election ===
==== Results ====
Kentucky's 4th congressional district special election, 2012
Party	Candidate	Votes	%
Republican	Thomas Massie	174,092	59.9
Democratic	Bill Adkins	106,598	36.7
Independent	David Lewis	9,987	3.4
Total votes		290,677	100.0
Republican hold			

=== General election ===
==== Predictions ====
Source	Ranking	As of
The Cook Political Report	Safe R	November 5, 2012
Rothenberg	Safe R	November 2, 2012
Roll Call	Safe R	November 4, 2012
Sabato's Crystal Ball	Safe R	November 5, 2012
NY Times	Safe R	November 4, 2012
RCP	Safe R	November 4, 2012
The Hill	Safe R	November 4, 2012

==== Results ====
Kentucky's 4th congressional district regular election, 2012
Party	Candidate	Votes	%
Republican	Thomas Massie	186,036	62.1
Democratic	Bill Adkins	104,734	35.0
Independent	David Lewis	8,674	2.9
Total votes		299,444	100.0
Republican hold			

== District 5 ==
2012 Kentucky's 5th congressional district election
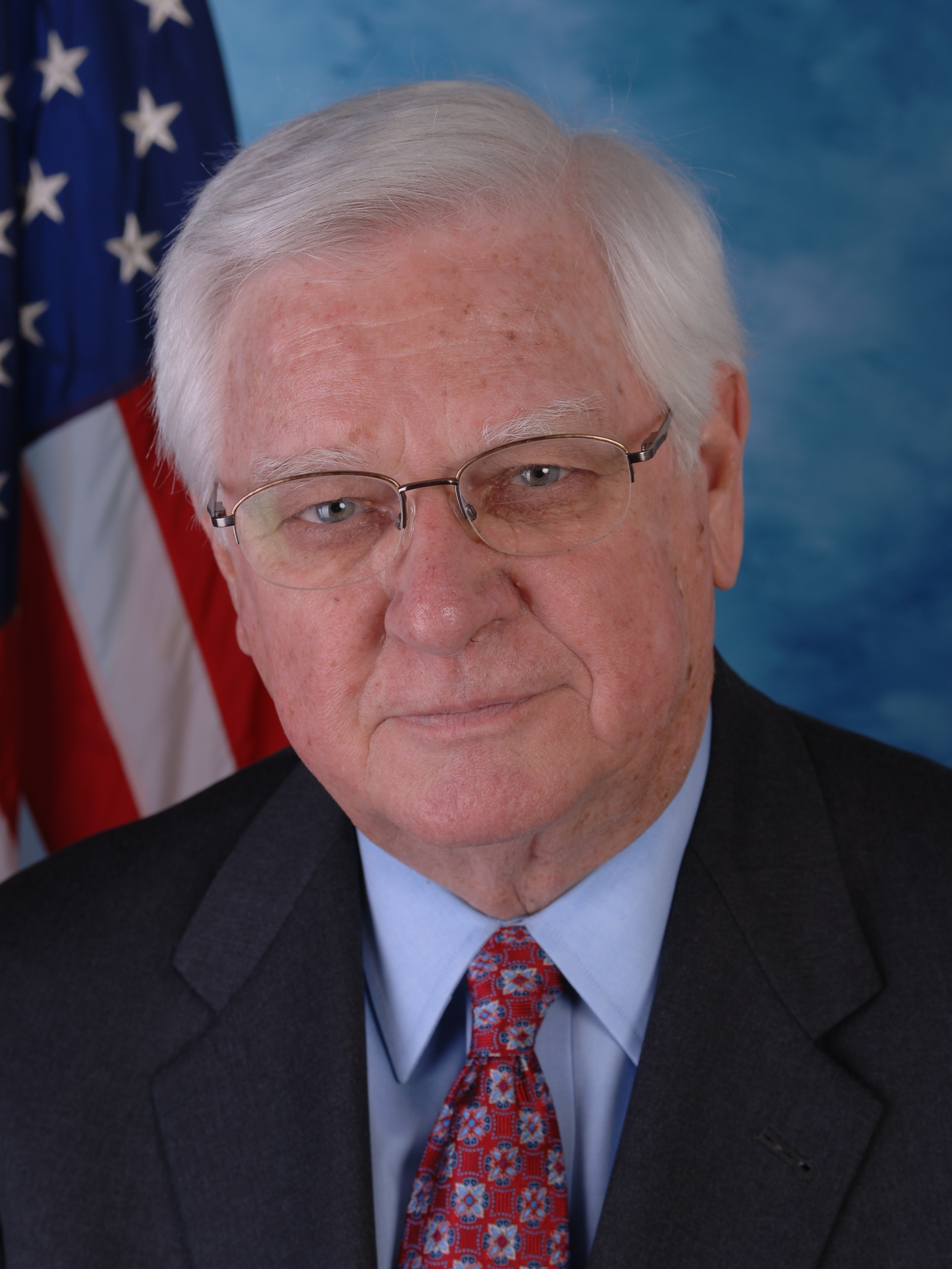

Nominee	Hal Rogers	Kenneth Stepp
Party	Republican	Democratic
Popular vote	195,408	55,447
Percentage	77.9%	22.1%
- County results Rogers: 50–60% 60–70% 70–80% 80–90% >90% Stepp: 50–60%
U.S. Representative before election
Hal Rogers
Republican
Elected U.S. Representative
Hal Rogers
Republican

Republican Hal Rogers, who had represented the 5th district since 1981, ran for re-election. The 5th district was made slightly more competitive in redistricting.

=== Republican primary ===
==== Candidates ====
===== Nominee =====
- Hal Rogers, incumbent U.S. Representative

=== Democratic primary ===
==== Candidates ====
===== Nominee =====
- Kenneth Stepp, lawyer

===== Eliminated in primary =====
- Michael Ackerman, lawyer

==== Primary results ====
Democratic primary results
Party	Candidate	Votes	%
Democratic	Kenneth S. Stepp	12,275	52.7
Democratic	Michael Ackerman	11,016	47.3
Total votes		23,291	100.0

=== General election ===
==== Predictions ====
Source	Ranking	As of
The Cook Political Report	Safe R	November 5, 2012
Rothenberg	Safe R	November 2, 2012
Roll Call	Safe R	November 4, 2012
Sabato's Crystal Ball	Safe R	November 5, 2012
NY Times	Safe R	November 4, 2012
RCP	Safe R	November 4, 2012
The Hill	Safe R	November 4, 2012

==== Results ====
Kentucky's 5th congressional district, 2012
Party	Candidate	Votes	%
Republican	Hal Rogers (incumbent)	195,408	77.9
Democratic	Kenneth S. Stepp	55,447	22.1
Total votes		250,855	100.0
Republican hold			

== District 6 ==
2012 Kentucky's 6th congressional district election
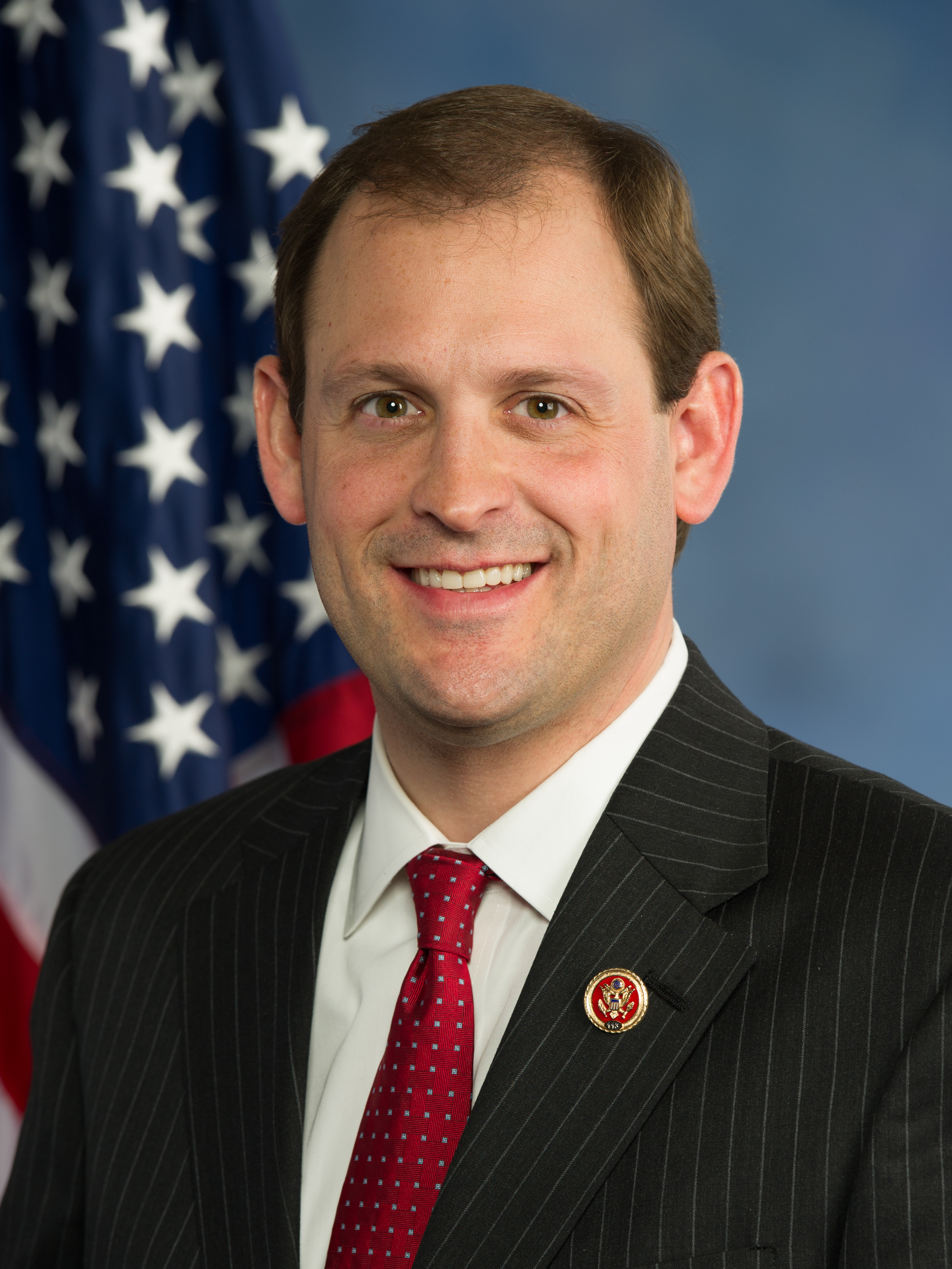

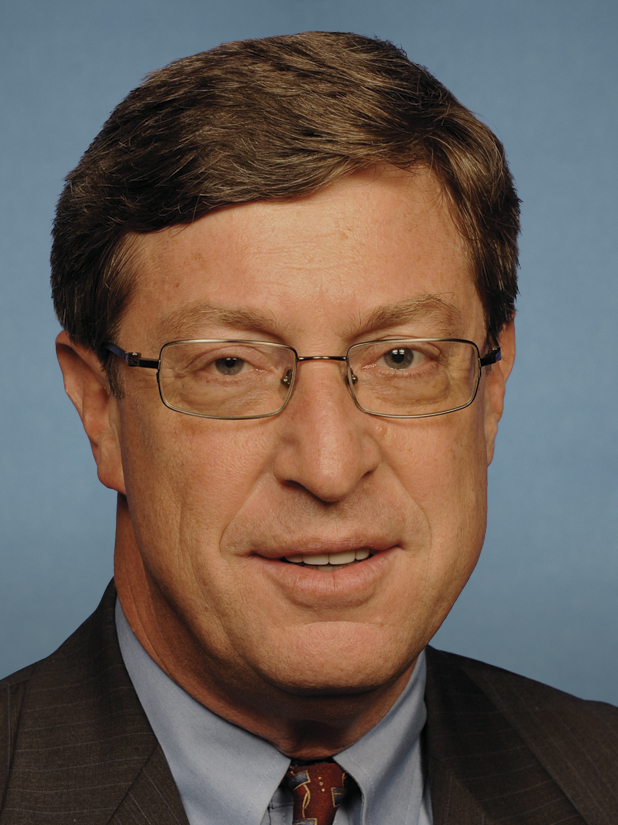
Nominee	Andy Barr	Ben Chandler
Party	Republican	Democratic
Popular vote	153,222	141,438
Percentage	50.6%	46.7%
- County results Barr: 40–50% 50–60% 60–70% Chandler: 50–60%
U.S. Representative before election
Ben Chandler
Democratic
Elected U.S. Representative
Andy Barr
Republican

Democrat Ben Chandler, who had represented the 6th district since 2004, ran for re-election. In redistricting, the 6th district was modified with the effect that, had the 2008 presidential election been held under the new boundaries, Democratic nominee Barack Obama would have received a share of the vote 1.5 percentage points greater than that which he achieved under the former boundaries.

=== Democratic primary ===
==== Candidates ====
===== Nominee =====
- Ben Chandler, incumbent U.S. Representative

=== Republican primary ===
==== Candidates ====
===== Nominee =====
- Andy Barr, attorney and nominee for this seat in 2010

===== Eliminated in primary =====
- Patrick J. Kelly II
- Curtis Kenimer

==== Primary results ====
Republican primary results
Party	Candidate	Votes	%
Republican	Andy Barr	20,104	82.8
Republican	Patrick J. Kelly, II	2,823	11.6
Republican	Curtis Kenimer	1,354	5.6
Total votes		24,281	100.0

=== General election ===
Randolph S. Vance ran as a write-in candidate.

==== Endorsements ====
Ben Chandler (D)

Organizations

- Blue Dog Coalition
- Democratic Congressional Campaign Committee "Frontline" Program
Andy Barr (R)

Organizations

- National Republican Congressional Committee "Young Guns" Program

==== Polling ====
Poll source	Date(s) administered	Sample size	Margin of error	Ben Chandler (D)	Andy Barr (R)	Randolph Vance (I)	Undecided
Public Opinion Strategies (R-Barr)	September 30–October 1, 2012	400	± %	49%	46%	—	5%
Mellman (D-Chandler)	September 10–13, 2012	400	± 4.9%	51%	37%	3%	9%
Public Opinion Strategies (R-Barr)	June 24–26, 2012	400	± 4.9%	47%	42%	—	13%
Mellman (D-Chandler)	March 26–28, 2012	400	± 4.9%	54%	30%	—	16%
Public Opinion Strategies (R-Barr)	February 20–21, 2012	400	± 4.9%	49%	42%	—	9%

==== Predictions ====
Source	Ranking	As of
The Cook Political Report	Tossup	November 5, 2012
Rothenberg	Tossup	November 2, 2012
Roll Call	Tossup	November 4, 2012
Sabato's Crystal Ball	Lean R (flip)	November 5, 2012
NY Times	Lean D	November 4, 2012
RCP	Tossup	November 4, 2012
The Hill	Tossup	November 4, 2012

==== Results ====
Kentucky's 6th congressional district, 2012
Party	Candidate	Votes	%
Republican	Andy Barr	153,222	50.6
Democratic	Ben Chandler (incumbent)	141,438	46.7
Independent	Randolph Vance	8,340	2.7
Total votes		303,000	100.0
Republican gain from Democratic			

Preceded by 2010 elections	United States House elections in Kentucky; 2012	Succeeded by 2014 elections
