= 2014 United States House of Representatives elections in Kentucky =

- November 4, 2014

All 6 Kentucky seats to the United States House of Representatives
	Majority party	Minority party
Party	Republican	Democratic
Last election	5	1
Seats won	5	1
Seat change	Steady	Steady
Popular vote	887,157	508,151
Percentage	63.58%	36.42%
Swing	▲4.71%	▼2.81%

Republican
50–60%
60–70%
70–80%
80–90%
90–100%
Democratic
50–60%
60–70%

The 2014 United States House of Representatives elections in Kentucky was held on Tuesday, November 4, 2014, to elect the six U.S. representatives from the state of Kentucky, one from each of the state's six congressional districts. The elections coincided with the elections of other federal and state offices, including an election to the U.S. Senate.

== Overview ==
Results of the 2014 United States House of Representatives elections in Kentucky by district:

District	Republican		Democratic		Others		Total		Result
District	Votes	%	Votes	%	Votes	%	Votes	%	Result
District 1	173,022	73.12%	63,596	26.88%	0	0.00%	236,618	100.0%	Republican hold
District 2	156,936	69.19%	69,898	30.81%	0	0.00%	226,834	100.0%	Republican hold
District 3	87,981	35.57%	157,056	63.49%	2,318	0.94%	247,355	100.0%	Democratic hold
District 4	150,464	67.73%	71,694	32.27%	0	0.00%	222,158	100.0%	Republican hold
District 5	171,350	78.25%	47,617	21.75%	0	0.00%	218,967	100.0%	Republican hold
District 6	147,404	59.99%	98,290	40.01%	0	0.00%	245,694	100.0%	Republican hold
Total	887,157	63.48%	508,151	36.36%	2,318	0.16%	1,397,626	100.0%	

== District 1 ==
2014 Kentucky's 1st congressional district election
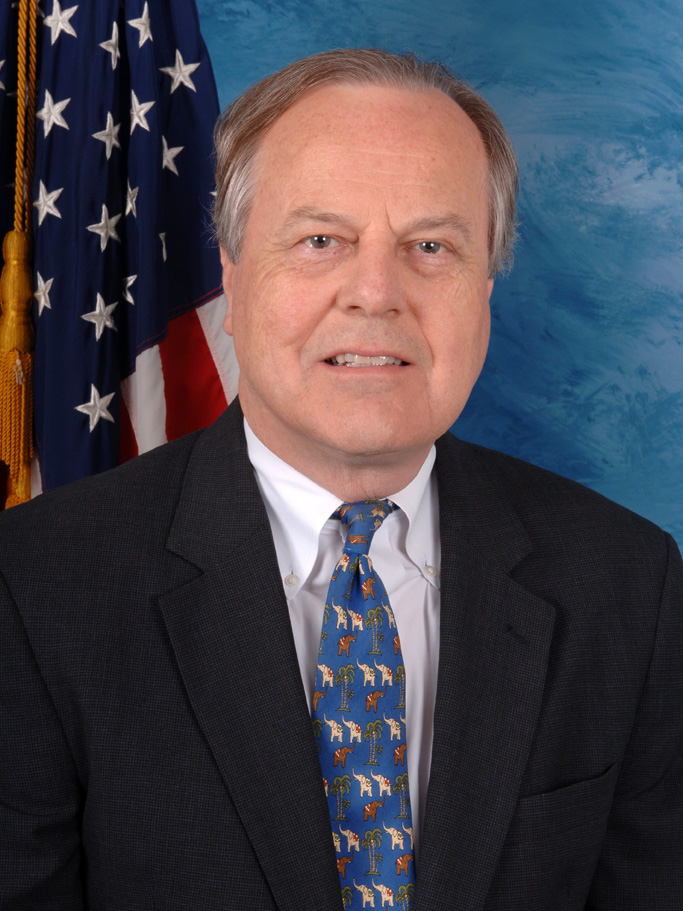

Nominee	Ed Whitfield	Charles Hatchett
Party	Republican	Democratic
Popular vote	173,022	63,596
Percentage	73.1%	26.9%
- County results Whitfield: 60–70% 70–80% 80–90% Hatchett: 50–60%
U.S. Representative before election
Ed Whitfield
Republican
Elected U.S. Representative
Ed Whitfield
Republican

Incumbent Republican Ed Whitfield, who had represented the district since 1995, ran for re-election.

=== Republican primary ===
==== Candidates ====
===== Nominee =====
- Ed Whitfield, incumbent U.S. Representative

=== Democratic primary ===
==== Candidates ====
===== Nominee =====
- Charles Kendall Hatchett, real estate broker and nominee for this seat in 2010 & 2012

===== Eliminated in primary =====
- Wesley Bolin

==== Results ====
Democratic primary results
Party	Candidate	Votes	%
Democratic	Charles Kendall Hatchett	38,055	55.5
Democratic	Wesley Seaton Bolin	30,528	44.5
Total votes		68,583	100.0

=== General election ===
==== Predictions ====
Source	Ranking	As of
The Cook Political Report	Safe R	November 3, 2014
Rothenberg	Safe R	October 24, 2014
Sabato's Crystal Ball	Safe R	October 30, 2014
RCP	Safe R	November 2, 2014
Daily Kos Elections	Safe R	November 4, 2014

==== Results ====
Kentucky's 1st congressional district, 2014
Party	Candidate	Votes	%
Republican	Ed Whitfield (incumbent)	173,022	73.1
Democratic	Charles Kendall Hatchett	63,596	26.9
Total votes		236,618	100.0
Republican hold			

== District 2 ==
2014 Kentucky's 2nd congressional district election
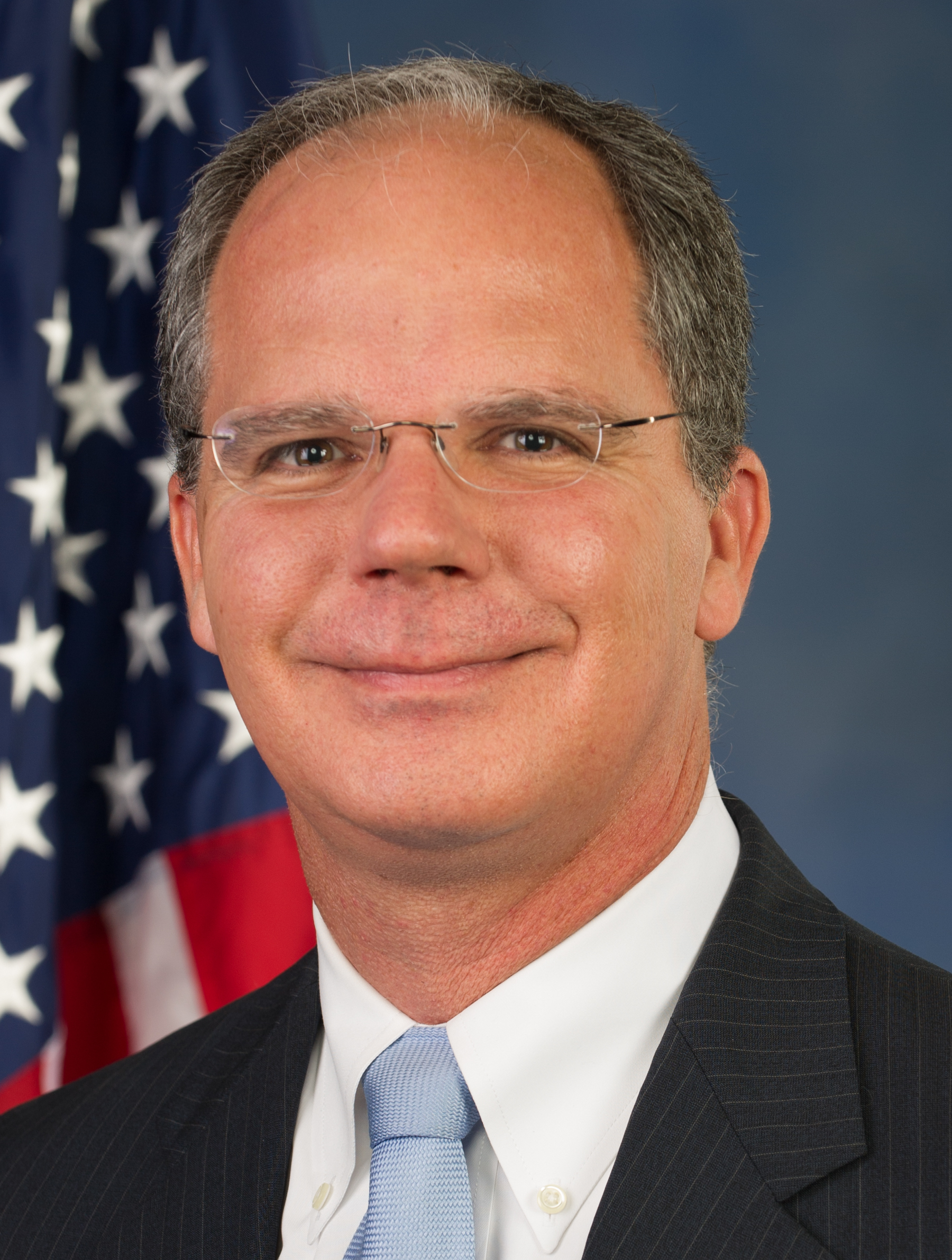

Nominee	Brett Guthrie	Ron Leach
Party	Republican	Democratic
Popular vote	156,936	69,898
Percentage	69.2%	30.8%
- County results Guthrie: 60–70% 70–80% 80–90%
U.S. Representative before election
Brett Guthrie
Republican
Elected U.S. Representative
Brett Guthrie
Republican

Republican incumbent Brett Guthrie, who had represented the 2nd district since 2009, ran for re-election.

=== Republican primary ===
==== Candidates ====
===== Nominee =====
- Brett Guthrie, incumbent U.S. Representative

=== Democratic primary ===
==== Candidates ====
===== Nominee =====
- Ron Leach, physician assistant and U.S. Army veteran

=== General election ===
==== Predictions ====
Source	Ranking	As of
The Cook Political Report	Safe R	November 3, 2014
Rothenberg	Safe R	October 24, 2014
Sabato's Crystal Ball	Safe R	October 30, 2014
RCP	Safe R	November 2, 2014
Daily Kos Elections	Safe R	November 4, 2014

==== Results ====
Kentucky's 2nd congressional district, 2014
Party	Candidate	Votes	%
Republican	Brett Guthrie (incumbent)	156,936	69.2
Democratic	Ron Leach	69,898	30.8
Total votes		226,834	100.0
Republican hold			

== District 3 ==
2014 Kentucky's 3rd congressional district election
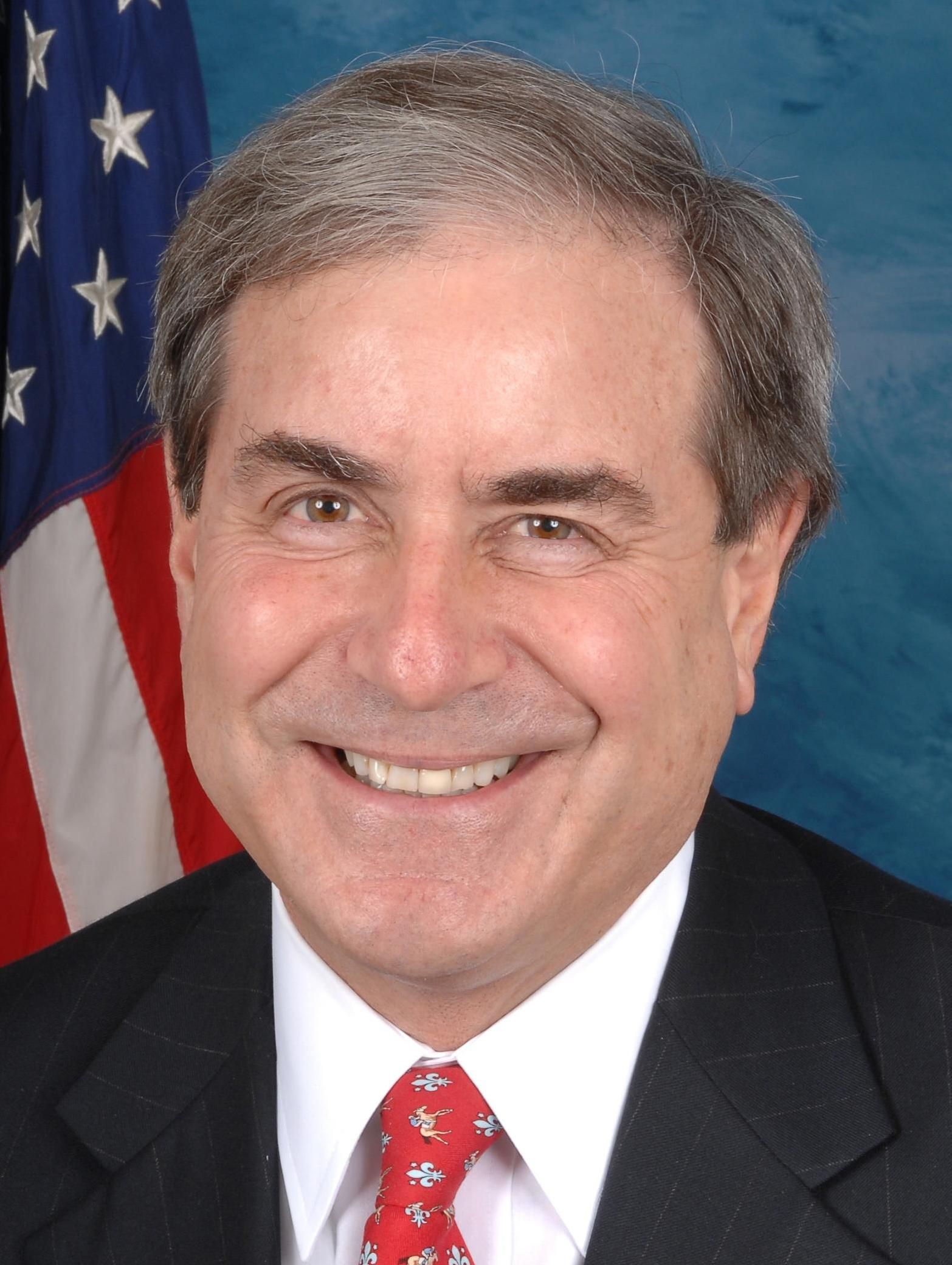

Nominee	John Yarmuth	Michael MacFarlane
Party	Democratic	Republican
Popular vote	157,056	87,981
Percentage	63.5%	35.6%
- County result Yarmuth: 60–70%
U.S. Representative before election
John Yarmuth
Democratic
Elected U.S. Representative
John Yarmuth
Democratic

Incumbent Democrat John Yarmuth, who had represented the district since 2007, ran for re-election.

=== Democratic primary ===
==== Candidates ====
===== Nominee =====
- John Yarmuth, incumbent U.S. Representative

===== Eliminated in primary =====
- E. Ray Pierce

==== Results ====
Democratic primary results
Party	Candidate	Votes	%
Democratic	John Yarmuth (incumbent)	52,026	87.0
Democratic	E. Ray Pierce	7,747	13.0
Total votes		59,773	100.0

=== Republican primary ===
==== Candidates ====
===== Nominee =====
- Michael MacFarlane

=== General election ===
==== Predictions ====
Source	Ranking	As of
The Cook Political Report	Safe D	November 3, 2014
Rothenberg	Safe D	October 24, 2014
Sabato's Crystal Ball	Safe D	October 30, 2014
RCP	Safe D	November 2, 2014
Daily Kos Elections	Safe D	November 4, 2014

==== Results ====
Kentucky's 3rd congressional district, 2014
Party	Candidate	Votes	%
Democratic	John Yarmuth (incumbent)	157,056	63.5
Republican	Michael MacFarlane	87,981	35.6
Independent	Gregory Peter Puccetti	2,318	0.9
Total votes		247,355	100.0
Democratic hold			

== District 4 ==
2014 Kentucky's 4th congressional district election
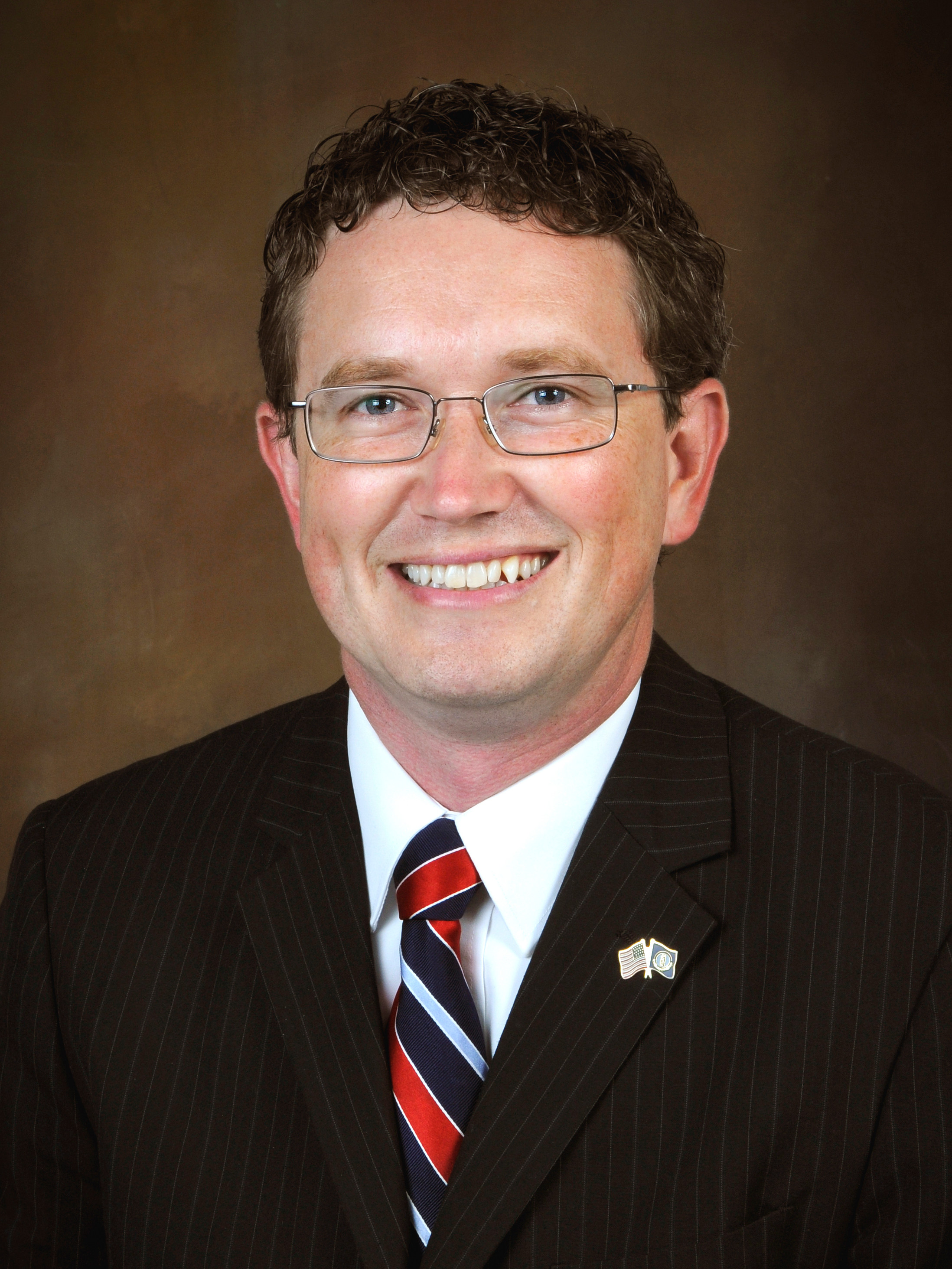

Nominee	Thomas Massie	Peter Newberry
Party	Republican	Democratic
Popular vote	150,464	71,694
Percentage	67.7%	32.3%
- County results Massie: 50–60% 60–70% 70–80%
U.S. Representative before election
Thomas Massie
Republican
Elected U.S. Representative
Thomas Massie
Republican

Incumbent Republican Thomas Massie, who had represented the district since 2012, ran for re-election.

=== Republican primary ===
==== Candidates ====
===== Nominee =====
- Thomas Massie, incumbent U.S. Representative

===== Declined =====
- Steve Stevens, Northern Kentucky Chamber of Commerce President

=== Democratic primary ===
==== Candidates ====
===== Nominee =====
- Peter Newberry

=== General election ===
==== Predictions ====
Source	Ranking	As of
The Cook Political Report	Safe R	November 3, 2014
Rothenberg	Safe R	October 24, 2014
Sabato's Crystal Ball	Safe R	October 30, 2014
RCP	Safe R	November 2, 2014
Daily Kos Elections	Safe R	November 4, 2014

==== Results ====
Kentucky's 4th congressional district, 2014
Party	Candidate	Votes	%
Republican	Thomas Massie (incumbent)	150,464	67.7
Democratic	Peter Newberry	71,694	32.3
Total votes		222,158	100.0
Republican hold			

== District 5 ==
2014 Kentucky's 5th congressional district election
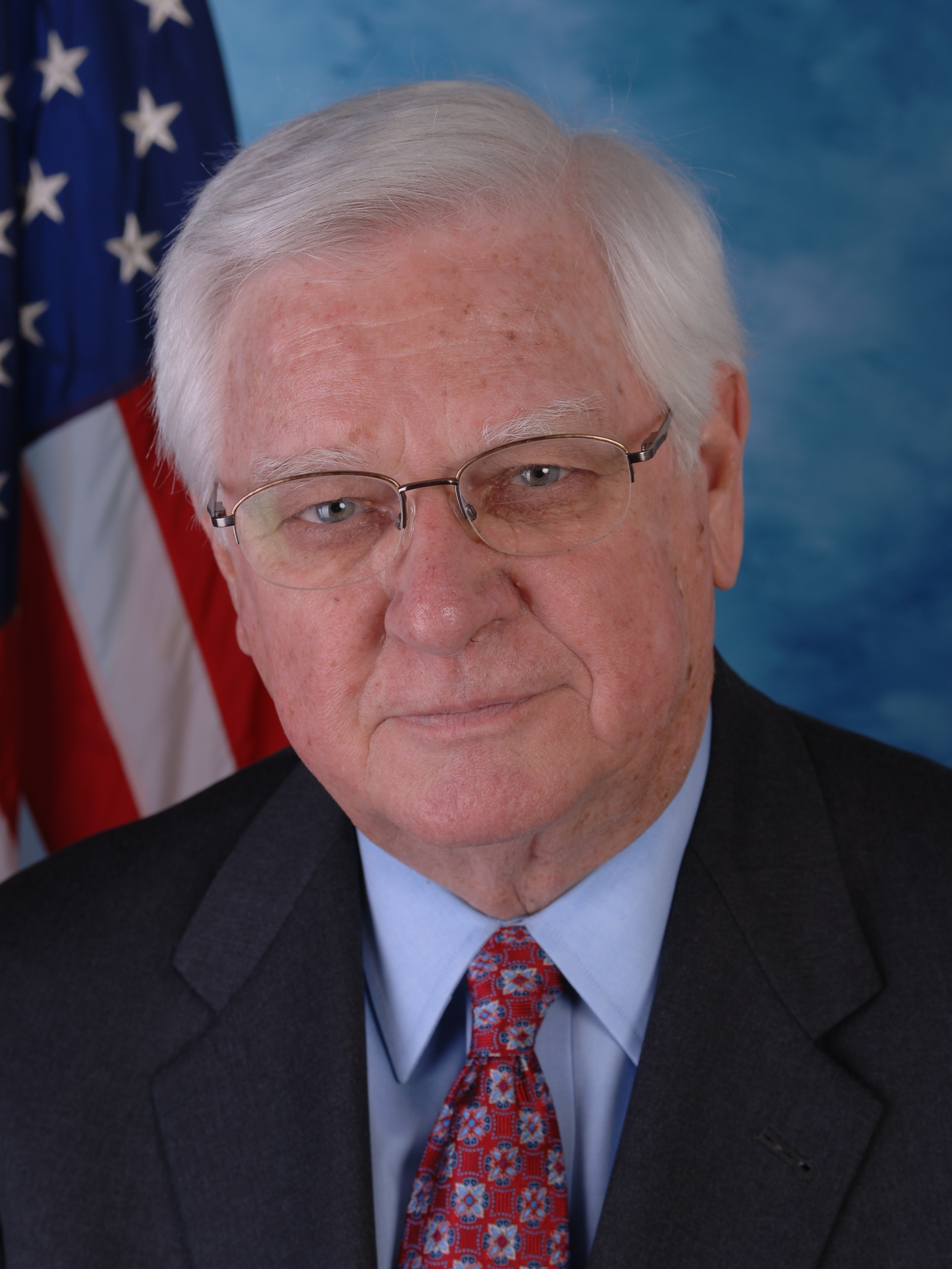

Nominee	Hal Rogers	Kenneth Stepp
Party	Republican	Democratic
Popular vote	171,350	47,617
Percentage	78.3%	21.7%
- County results Rogers: 50–60% 60–70% 70–80% 80–90% >90% Stepp: 50–60%
U.S. Representative before election
Hal Rogers
Republican
Elected U.S. Representative
Hal Rogers
Republican

Republican incumbent Hal Rogers, who had represented the 5th district since 1981, ran for re-election. As of 2024, this is the latest election in which Hal Rogers did not win every county in the district.

=== Republican primary ===
==== Candidates ====
===== Nominee =====
- Hal Rogers, incumbent U.S. Representative

=== Democratic primary ===
==== Candidates ====
===== Nominee =====
- Kenneth Stepp, attorney

===== Eliminated in primary =====
- Billy Ray Wilson

==== Results ====
Democratic primary results
Party	Candidate	Votes	%
Democratic	Kenneth Stepp	38,949	58.8
Democratic	Billy Ray Wilson	27,246	41.2
Total votes		66,195	100.0

=== General election ===
==== Predictions ====
Source	Ranking	As of
The Cook Political Report	Safe R	November 3, 2014
Rothenberg	Safe R	October 24, 2014
Sabato's Crystal Ball	Safe R	October 30, 2014
RCP	Safe R	November 2, 2014
Daily Kos Elections	Safe R	November 4, 2014

==== Results ====
Kentucky's 5th congressional district, 2014
Party	Candidate	Votes	%
Republican	Hal Rogers (incumbent)	171,350	78.3
Democratic	Kenneth Stepp	47,617	21.7
Total votes		218,967	100.0
Republican hold			

== District 6 ==
2014 Kentucky's 6th congressional district election
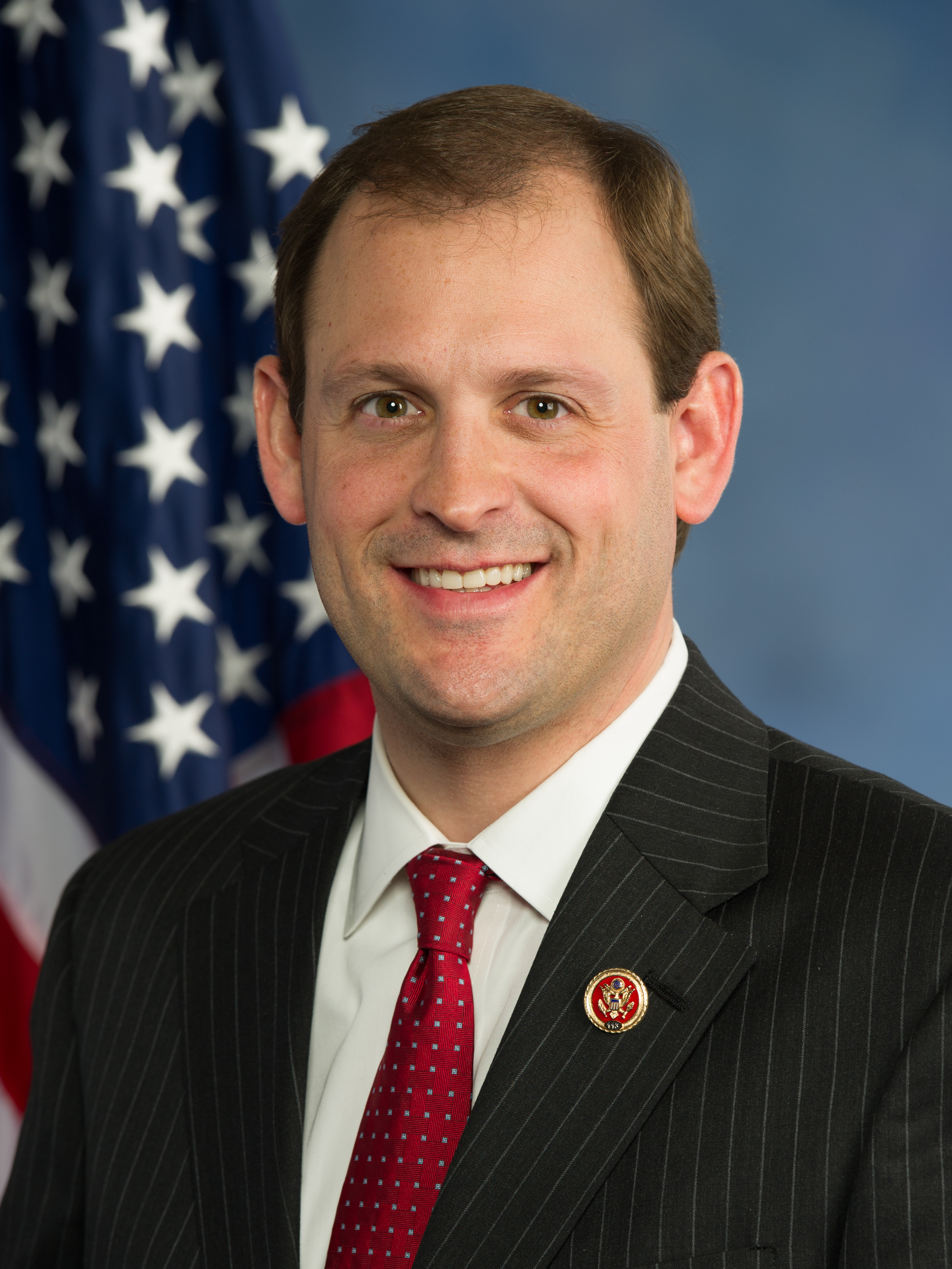

Nominee	Andy Barr	Elisabeth Jensen
Party	Republican	Democratic
Popular vote	147,404	98,290
Percentage	60.0%	40.0%
- County results Barr: 50–60% 60–70% 70–80%
U.S. Representative before election
Andy Barr
Republican
Elected U.S. Representative
Andy Barr
Republican

Incumbent Republican Andy Barr, who had represented the district since 2013, ran for re-election.

=== Republican primary ===
==== Candidates ====
===== Nominee =====
- Andy Barr, incumbent U.S. Representative

=== Democratic primary ===
Jensen was seen as the front-runner for the Democratic nomination.

==== Candidates ====
===== Nominee =====
- Elisabeth Jensen, education advocate

===== Eliminated in primary =====
- Geoff Young, former contractor and Green candidate for Kentucky House of Representatives 45th District in 2012

===== Withdrawn =====
- Michael Coblenz, attorney and former Air Force B-52 navigator
- Joe Palumbo, lumber yard owner and son of state representative Ruth Ann Palumbo

===== Declined =====
- Teresa Isaac, former mayor of Lexington and candidate for this seat in 1996

==== Results ====
Democratic primary results
Party	Candidate	Votes	%
Democratic	Elisabeth Jensen	46,727	60.9
Democratic	Geoff Young	30,035	39.1
Total votes		76,762	100.0

=== General election ===
==== Polling ====
Poll source	Date(s) administered	Sample size	Margin of error	Andy Barr (R)	Elisabeth Jensen (D)	Undecided
Public Opinion Strategies (R-Barr)	September 17–18, 2014	400	± 4.9%	55%	36%	9%
Lake Research Partners (D-Jensen)	September 15–17, 2014	400	± 4.9%	45%	36%	19%

==== Predictions ====
Source	Ranking	As of
The Cook Political Report	Safe R	November 3, 2014
Rothenberg	Safe R	October 24, 2014
Sabato's Crystal Ball	Safe R	October 30, 2014
RCP	Safe R	November 2, 2014
Daily Kos Elections	Safe R	November 4, 2014

==== Results ====
Kentucky's 6th congressional district, 2014
Party	Candidate	Votes	%
Republican	Andy Barr (incumbent)	147,404	60.0
Democratic	Elisabeth Jensen	98,290	40.0
Total votes		245,694	100.0
Republican hold			

== See also ==
- 2014 United States House of Representatives elections
- 2014 United States elections

Preceded by 2012 elections	United States House elections in Kentucky; 2014	Succeeded by 2016 elections
