= Kenneth F. Harper =

American politician (1931–2025)

Member of the Kentucky House of Representatives from the 63rd district
- In office January 1, 1982 – January 1, 1995
- Preceded by: Louis DeFalaise
- Succeeded by: Richard Murgatroyd
- In office January 1, 1964 – May 1968
- Preceded by: James Murphy (redistricting)
- Succeeded by: Carl Ruh

75th Secretary of State of Kentucky
- In office February 2, 1971 – January 3, 1972
- Governor: Louie B. Nunn; Wendell Ford
- Preceded by: Leila Feltner Begley
- Succeeded by: Thelma Stovall

Personal details
- Born: January 15, 1931 Covington, Kentucky, U.S.
- Died: November 21, 2025 (aged 94)
- Party: Republican

Kenneth F. Harper (January 15, 1931 – November 21, 2025) was an American politician from the state of Kentucky. He served in the Kentucky House of Representatives from 1964 to 1968 and from 1982 to 1995, as a Republican. Harper also served as Secretary of State of Kentucky from 1971 to 1972. He was a United States Air Force veteran of the Korean War.

Harper attended the Kentucky Military Institute and University of Kentucky.

Harper died on November 21, 2025, at the age of 94.

Party political offices
Preceded by Elmer Begley	Republican nominee for Secretary of State of Kentucky; 1971	Succeeded by Huda B. Jones
