= 2010 United States House of Representatives elections in Kentucky =

- November 2, 2010

All 6 Kentucky seats to the United States House of Representatives
| | Majority party | Minority party |
|---|---|---|
| Party | Republican | Democratic |
| Last election | 4 | 2 |
| Seats won | 4 | 2 |
| Seat change | Steady | Steady |
| Popular vote | 844,369 | 506,319 |
| Percentage | 62.35% | 37.39% |
| Swing | ▲7.76% | ▼6.11% |

Republican
50–60%
60–70%
70–80%
80–90%
Democratic
50–60%
60–70%

The 2010 congressional elections in Kentucky were held on November 2, 2010, and determined who would represent the Commonwealth of Kentucky in the United States House of Representatives. Kentucky has six seats in the House, apportioned according to the 2000 United States census. Representatives are elected for two-year terms; the elected served in the 112th Congress from January 3, 2011, until January 3, 2013. This was the last time the Democrats won more than one congressional district in Kentucky until 2026.

== Overview ==
United States House of Representatives elections in Kentucky, 2010
| Party | Votes | Percentage | Seats | +/– |
|---|---|---|---|---|
| Republican | 844,369 | 62.35% | 4 | — |
| Democratic | 506,319 | 37.39% | 2 | — |
| Libertarian | 2,029 | 0.15% | 0 | — |
| Independents | 1,581 | 0.12% | 0 | — |
| Totals | 1,354,298 | 100.00% | 6 | — |

=== By district ===
Results of the 2010 United States House of Representatives elections in Kentucky by district:

| District | Republican | | Democratic | | Others | | Total | | Result |
| District | Votes | % | Votes | % | Votes | % | Votes | % | Result |
|---|---|---|---|---|---|---|---|---|---|
| District 1 | 153,840 | 73.12% | 62,090 | 26.88% | 0 | 0.00% | 215,930 | 100.0% | Republican hold |
| District 2 | 155,906 | 69.19% | 73,749 | 30.81% | 0 | 0.00% | 229,655 | 100.0% | Republican hold |
| District 3 | 112,627 | 44.01% | 139,940 | 54.68% | 3,363 | 1.31% | 255,930 | 100.0% | Democratic hold |
| District 4 | 151,813 | 69.48% | 66,694 | 30.52% | 0 | 0.00% | 218,507 | 100.0% | Republican hold |
| District 5 | 151,019 | 77.42% | 44,034 | 22.58% | 0 | 0.00% | 195,053 | 100.0% | Republican hold |
| District 6 | 119,164 | 49.81% | 119,812 | 50.08% | 247 | 0.01% | 239,223 | 100.0% | Democratic hold |
| Total | 844,369 | 62.35% | 506,319 | 37.38% | 3,610 | 0.27% | 1,354,298 | 100.0% | |

== District 1 ==
2010 Kentucky's 1st congressional district election
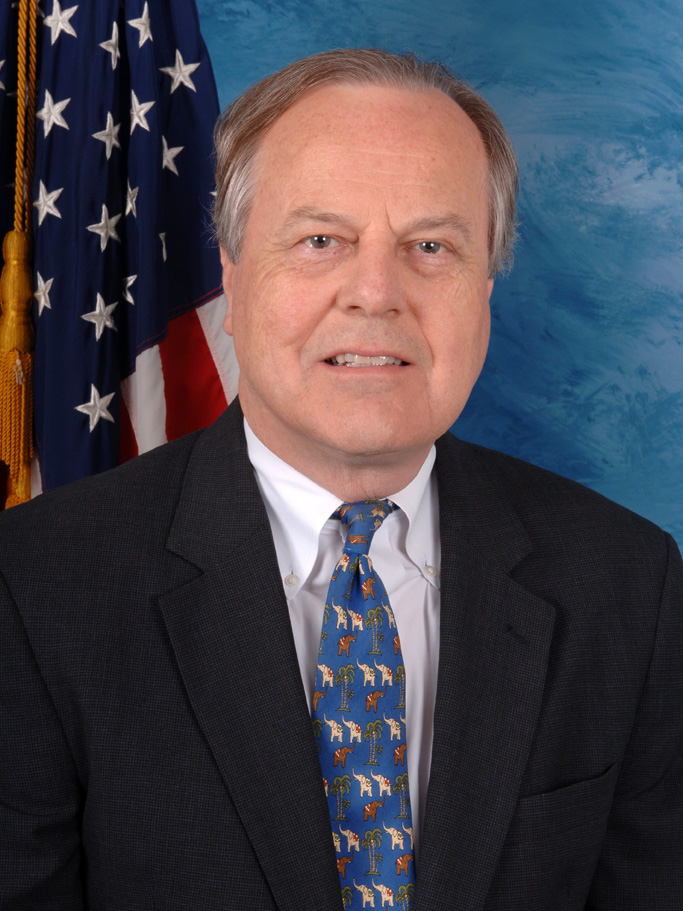

| Nominee | Ed Whitfield | Charles Hatchett |
| Party | Republican | Democratic |
| Popular vote | 153,840 | 62,090 |
| Percentage | 71.2% | 28.8% |
- County results Whitfield: 50–60% 60–70% 70–80% 80–90%
U.S. Representative before election
Ed Whitfield
Republican
Elected U.S. Representative
Ed Whitfield
Republican

Running for his ninth term in this conservative district based in western Kentucky, incumbent Republican Congressman Ed Whitfield faced a trivial challenge from Democratic candidate Charles Hatchett. As expected, Congressman Whitfield was overwhelmingly re-elected to another term in Congress.

=== Predictions ===
| Source | Ranking | As of |
|---|---|---|
| The Cook Political Report | Safe R | November 1, 2010 |
| Rothenberg | Safe R | November 1, 2010 |
| Sabato's Crystal Ball | Safe R | November 1, 2010 |
| RCP | Safe R | November 1, 2010 |
| CQ Politics | Safe R | October 28, 2010 |
| New York Times | Safe R | November 1, 2010 |
| FiveThirtyEight | Safe R | November 1, 2010 |

=== Results ===
Kentucky's 1st congressional district election, 2010
| Party | Candidate | Votes | % |
|---|---|---|---|
| Republican | Ed Whitfield (incumbent) | 153,840 | 71.25 |
| Democratic | Charles Kendall Hatchett | 62,090 | 28.75 |
| Total votes | | 215,930 | 100.00 |
| Republican hold | | | |

== District 2 ==
2010 Kentucky's 2nd congressional district election
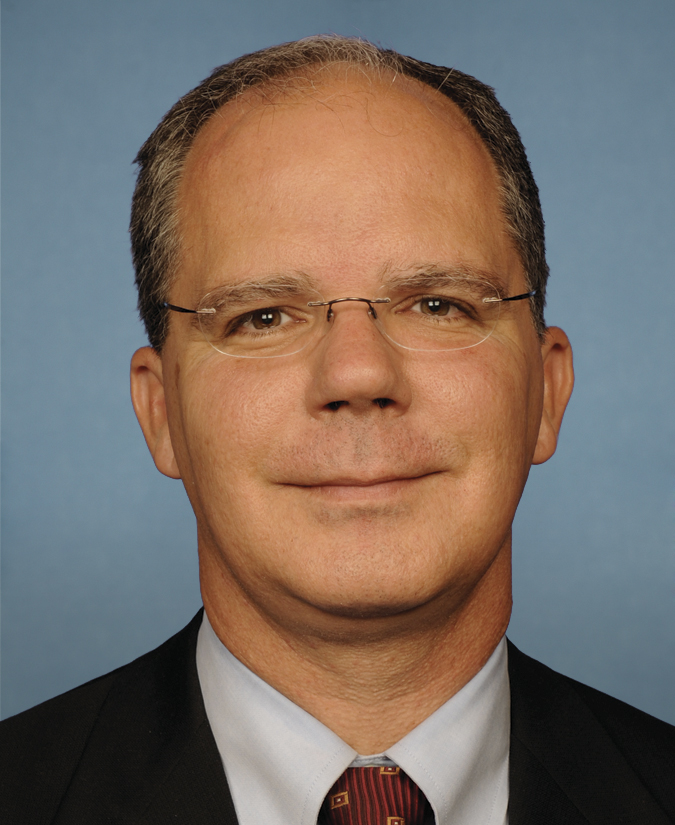

| Nominee | Brett Guthrie | Ed Marksberry |
| Party | Republican | Democratic |
| Popular vote | 155,906 | 73,749 |
| Percentage | 67.9% | 32.1% |
- County results Guthrie: 50–60% 60–70% 70–80%
U.S. Representative before election
Brett Guthrie
Republican
Elected U.S. Representative
Brett Guthrie
Republican

Though incumbent Republican Congressman Brett Guthrie was elected by a slim margin in 2008, he did not face a serious challenge in his bid for a second term from Democratic candidate Ed Marksberry. As was expected, Congressman Guthrie was re-elected in a landslide in this conservative district based in west-central Kentucky.

=== Predictions ===
| Source | Ranking | As of |
|---|---|---|
| The Cook Political Report | Safe R | November 1, 2010 |
| Rothenberg | Safe R | November 1, 2010 |
| Sabato's Crystal Ball | Safe R | November 1, 2010 |
| RCP | Safe R | November 1, 2010 |
| CQ Politics | Safe R | October 28, 2010 |
| New York Times | Safe R | November 1, 2010 |
| FiveThirtyEight | Safe R | November 1, 2010 |

=== Results ===
Kentucky's 2nd congressional district election, 2010
| Party | Candidate | Votes | % |
|---|---|---|---|
| Republican | Brett Guthrie (incumbent) | 155,906 | 67.89 |
| Democratic | Ed Marksberry | 73,749 | 32.11 |
| Total votes | | 229,655 | 100.00 |
| Republican hold | | | |

== District 3 ==
2010 Kentucky's 3rd congressional district election
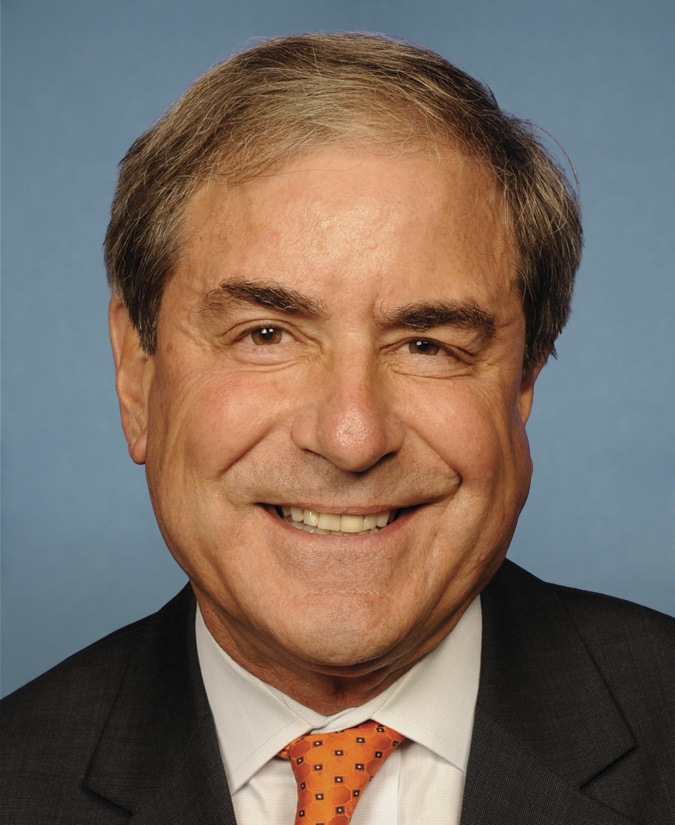

| Nominee | John Yarmuth | Todd Lally |
| Party | Democratic | Republican |
| Popular vote | 139,940 | 112,627 |
| Percentage | 54.7% | 44.0% |
- State House district results Yarmuth: 50–60% 60–70% 70–80% 80–90% Lally: 50–60% 60–70%
U.S. Representative before election
John Yarmuth
Democratic
Elected U.S. Representative
John Yarmuth
Democratic

=== Campaign ===
Two-term Democratic incumbent Congressman John Yarmuth has represented this liberal-leaning district based in metro Louisville since he was first elected in 2006. Yarmuth defeated Republican Congresswoman Anne Northup in 2006, and defeated her again in a rematch in 2008, but she declined to run again in 2010. Instead, Congressman Yarmuth faced Republican candidate Todd Lally, an airline pilot and a failed State House candidate.

Lally attacked Yarmuth for being a "liberal follower" of Nancy Pelosi who voted with her "San Francisco agenda 99 percent of the time," charges that Yarmuth called "ignorant and irresponsible." The Courier-Journal, the largest newspaper in the district, strongly endorsed Congressman Yarmuth in his bid for re-election, and in the end, Yarmuth was able to best Lally by a surprisingly wide margin.

=== Polling ===
| Poll source | Dates administered | John Yarmuth (D) | Todd Lally (R) | Undecided |
|---|---|---|---|---|
| SurveyUSA | October 21–25, 2010 | 50% | 46% | 1% |
| Rivercity Polling | October 19–23, 2010 | 41% | 37% | - |
| Braun Research | October 18–19, 2010 | 57.9% | 31.4% | 2.6% |
| Braun Research | September 20–21, 2010 | 53% | 30% | 12% |
| Survey USA | August 27–30, 2010 | 47% | 45% | 5% |
| Braun Research | August 9–10, 2010 | 52% | 29% | 17% |
| Rivercity Polling | June 20–29, 2010 | 44% | 43% | - |
| Cooper & Secrest Associates | June 21–23, 2010 | 58% | 32% | - |

==== Predictions ====
| Source | Ranking | As of |
|---|---|---|
| The Cook Political Report | Likely D | November 1, 2010 |
| Rothenberg | Likely D | November 1, 2010 |
| Sabato's Crystal Ball | Likely D | November 1, 2010 |
| RCP | Lean D | November 1, 2010 |
| CQ Politics | Likely D | October 28, 2010 |
| New York Times | Lean D | November 1, 2010 |
| FiveThirtyEight | Safe D | November 1, 2010 |

=== Results ===
Kentucky's 3rd congressional district election, 2010
| Party | Candidate | Votes | % |
|---|---|---|---|
| Democratic | John Yarmuth (incumbent) | 139,940 | 54.68 |
| Republican | Todd Lally | 112,627 | 44.01 |
| Libertarian | Edward A. Martin | 2,029 | 0.79 |
| Independent | Michael D. Hansen | 1,334 | 0.52 |
| Total votes | | 255,930 | 100.00 |
| Democratic hold | | | |

== District 4 ==
2010 Kentucky's 4th congressional district election
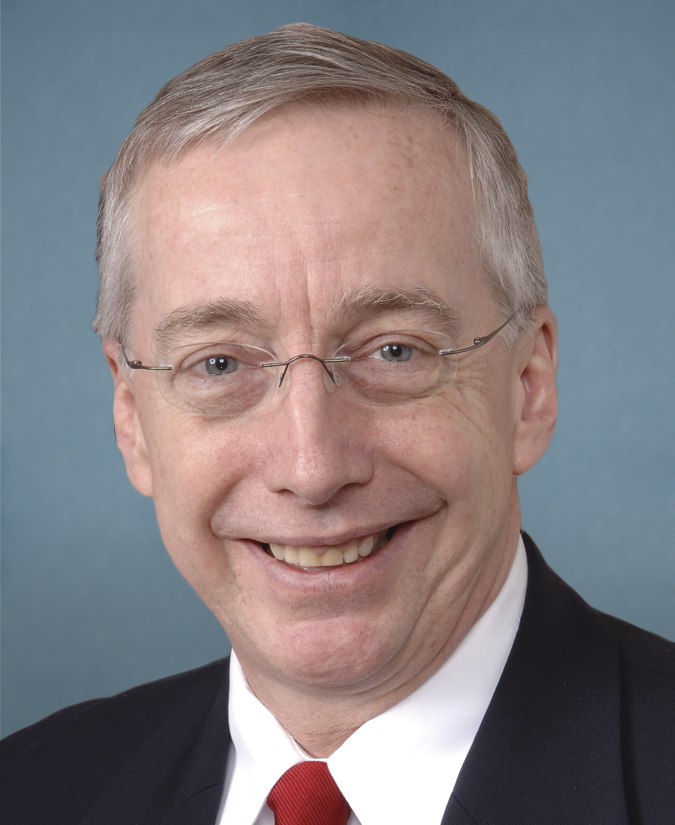

| Nominee | Geoff Davis | John Waltz |
| Party | Republican | Democratic |
| Popular vote | 151,813 | 66,694 |
| Percentage | 69.5% | 30.5% |
- County results Davis: 50–60% 60–70% 70–80% Waltz: 50–60%
U.S. Representative before election
Geoff Davis
Republican
Elected U.S. Representative
Geoff Davis
Republican

=== Campaign ===
This conservative district based in northern Kentucky, including some of metropolitan Cincinnati, has been represented by Republican Congressman Geoff Davis since he was first elected in 2004. Seeking a fourth term, Congressman Davis faced Democratic candidate John Waltz, an Iraq War veteran in the general election, who was not given much of a chance given the conservative nature of the district. As expected, Davis was overwhelmingly re-elected.

==== Predictions ====
| Source | Ranking | As of |
|---|---|---|
| The Cook Political Report | Safe R | November 1, 2010 |
| Rothenberg | Safe R | November 1, 2010 |
| Sabato's Crystal Ball | Safe R | November 1, 2010 |
| RCP | Safe R | November 1, 2010 |
| CQ Politics | Safe R | October 28, 2010 |
| New York Times | Safe R | November 1, 2010 |
| FiveThirtyEight | Safe R | November 1, 2010 |

=== Results ===
Kentucky's 4th congressional district election, 2010
| Party | Candidate | Votes | % |
|---|---|---|---|
| Republican | Geoff Davis (incumbent) | 151,813 | 69.48 |
| Democratic | John Waltz | 66,694 | 30.52 |
| Total votes | | 218,507 | 100.00 |
| Republican hold | | | |

== District 5 ==
2010 Kentucky's 5th congressional district election
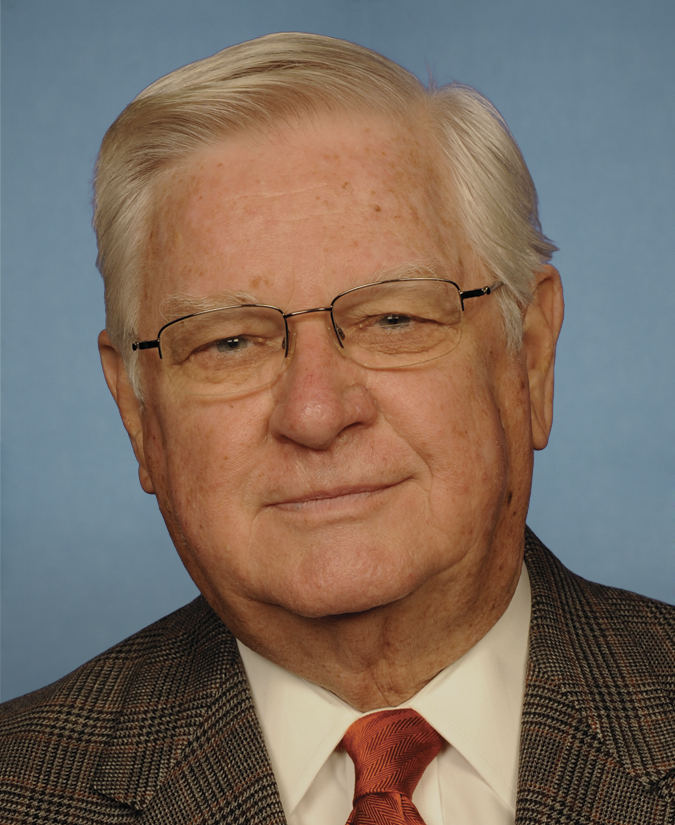

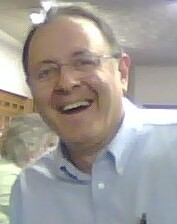
| Nominee | Hal Rogers | Jim Holbert |
| Party | Republican | Democratic |
| Popular vote | 151,019 | 44,034 |
| Percentage | 77.4% | 22.6% |
- County results Rogers: 50–60% 60–70% 70–80% 80–90%
U.S. Representative before election
Hal Rogers
Republican
Elected U.S. Representative
Hal Rogers
Republican

=== Campaign ===
Republican Congressman Hal Rogers, the dean of the Kentucky congressional delegation, has represented this conservative district based in eastern Kentucky, faced Democratic candidate Jim Holbert in his bid for a sixteenth term. Holbert had previously run against Congressman Rogers in 2008 as an independent candidate. However, Holbert was defeated by Rogers in a landslide for the second time in the general election.

==== Predictions ====
| Source | Ranking | As of |
|---|---|---|
| The Cook Political Report | Safe R | November 1, 2010 |
| Rothenberg | Safe R | November 1, 2010 |
| Sabato's Crystal Ball | Safe R | November 1, 2010 |
| RCP | Safe R | November 1, 2010 |
| CQ Politics | Safe R | October 28, 2010 |
| New York Times | Safe R | November 1, 2010 |
| FiveThirtyEight | Safe R | November 1, 2010 |

=== Results ===
Kentucky's 5th congressional district election, 2010
| Party | Candidate | Votes | % |
|---|---|---|---|
| Republican | Hal Rogers (incumbent) | 151,019 | 77.42 |
| Democratic | Jim Holbert | 44,034 | 22.58 |
| Total votes | | 195,053 | 100.00 |
| Republican hold | | | |

== District 6 ==
2010 Kentucky's 6th congressional district election
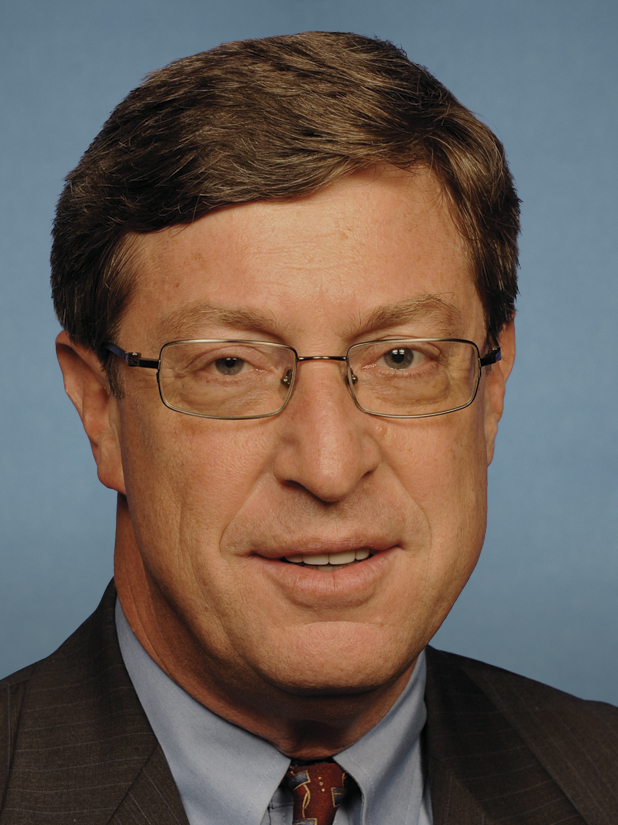

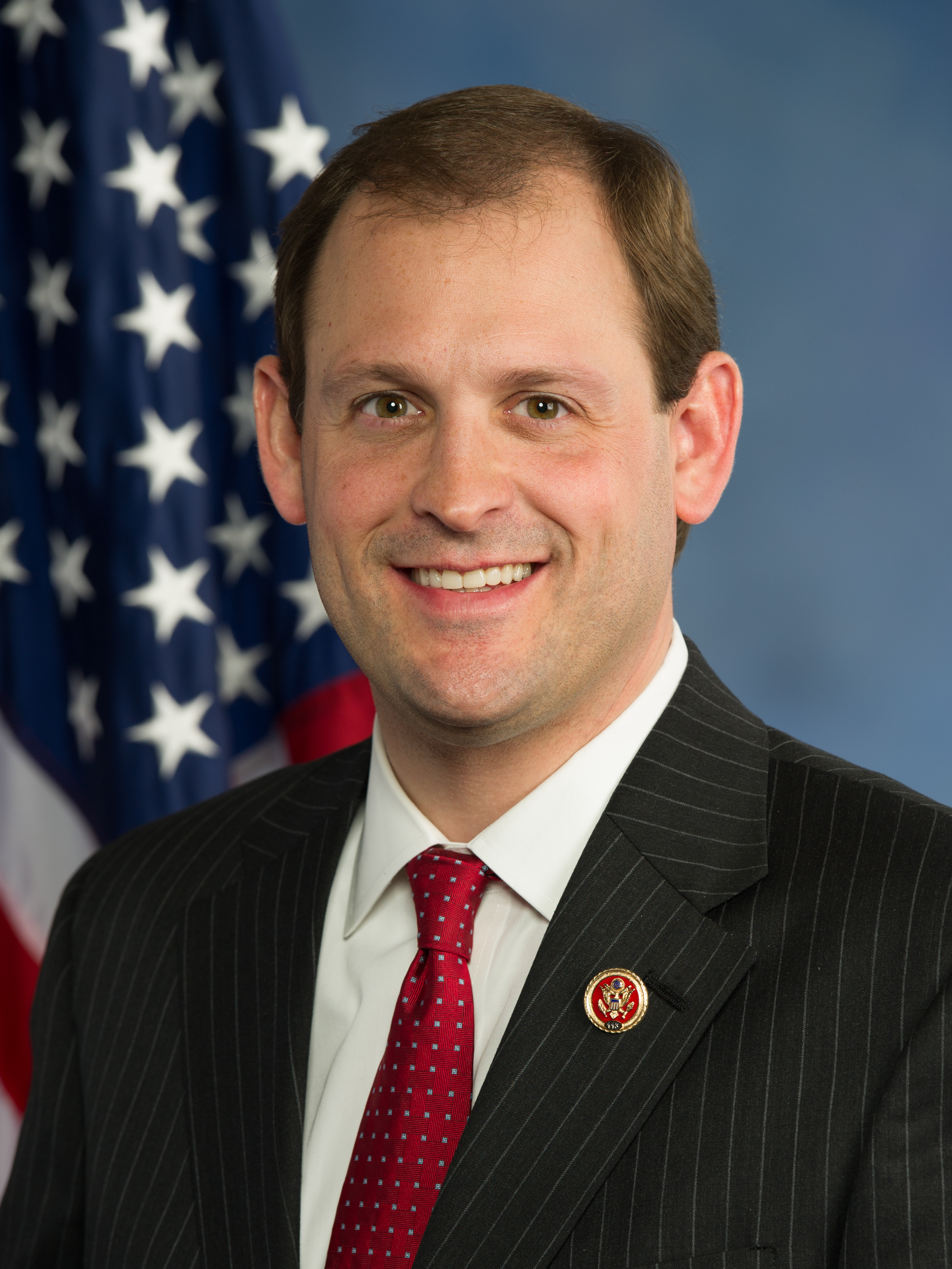
| Nominee | Ben Chandler | Andy Barr |
| Party | Democratic | Republican |
| Popular vote | 119,812 | 119,164 |
| Percentage | 50.1% | 49.8% |
- County results Chandler: 50–60% 60–70% Barr: 50–60% 60–70%
U.S. Representative before election
Ben Chandler
Democratic
Elected U.S. Representative
Ben Chandler
Democratic

=== Campaign ===
This conservative district based around the Lexington metropolitan area had been represented by incumbent Democratic Congressman Ben Chandler since he was first elected in a 2004 special election. In 2010, Chandler faced a serious threat to bid for a fifth term in Congress from Republican attorney Andy Barr.

In the general election, both candidates started releasing television ads in August 2010, with Barr attacking Chandler for being part of "politics as usual" while Chandler countered by proclaiming his independence, saying, "If the Republican Party is going to suggest that I'm a tool of somebody else, there is no basis in fact for that." As election day grew nearer, both sides ramped up attacks, with the Democratic Congressional Campaign Committee releasing an ads slamming Barr for his criminal record and plans to privatize Social Security. Barr, meanwhile, attacked Chandler for supporting gun control, even though Chandler was endorsed in his bid for re-election by the National Rifle Association of America. Polls predicted a tight race, and on election night, those polls were vindicated; no media organization called the race that night because Chandler led Barr by only a few hundred votes. It was only a few days later that Chandler was proclaimed the winner. Chandler was defeated for re-election in 2012 in a rematch with Barr.

=== Polling ===
| Poll source | Dates administered | Ben Chandler (D) | Andy Barr (R) | Undecided |
|---|---|---|---|---|
| Braun Research | October 20–21, 2010 | 46.6% | 42.3% | 11% |
| Mason-Dixon | October 15–19, 2010 | 48% | 44% | 8% |
| Tarrance Group | October 4–5, 2010 | 47% | 48% | - |
| Mellman Group | September 29–30, 2010 | 52% | 40% | - |
| Braun Research | September 21–22, 2010 | 50.7% | 36.5% | 12.5% |
| Tarrance Group | September 20–21, 2010 | 49% | 42% | 9% |
| Mellman Group | September 13–14, 2010 | 53% | 33% | 14% |
| Grove Insight | September 7–9, 2010 | 52% | 38% | - |
| Braun Research | July 26–27, 2010 | 46.1% | 32.2% | 21% |
| Tarrance Group | May 24–25, 2010 | 45% | 38% | 17% |

==== Predictions ====
| Source | Ranking | As of |
|---|---|---|
| The Cook Political Report | Tossup | November 1, 2010 |
| Rothenberg | Lean D | November 1, 2010 |
| Sabato's Crystal Ball | Lean D | November 1, 2010 |
| RCP | Tossup | November 1, 2010 |
| CQ Politics | Lean D | October 28, 2010 |
| New York Times | Tossup | November 1, 2010 |
| FiveThirtyEight | Tossup | November 1, 2010 |

=== Results ===
Kentucky's 6th congressional district election, 2010
| Party | Candidate | Votes | % |
|---|---|---|---|
| Democratic | Ben Chandler (incumbent) | 119,812 | 50.08 |
| Republican | Andy Barr | 119,164 | 49.81 |
| Write-in | | 247 | 0.10 |
| Total votes | | 239,223 | 100.00 |
| Democratic hold | | | |

| Preceded by 2008 elections | United States House elections in Kentucky; 2010 | Succeeded by 2012 elections |
