= Richard Murgatroyd =

American politician

Judge/Executive of Kenton County
- In office January 4, 1999 – January 16, 2004
- Preceded by: Clyde Middleton
- Succeeded by: Ralph Drees

Member of the Kentucky House of Representatives from the 63rd district
- In office January 1, 1995 – January 1, 1999
- Preceded by: Kenneth F. Harper
- Succeeded by: Jon Draud

Personal details
- Party: Republican

Richard Murgatroyd (born 1937) is an American politician from Kentucky who was a member of the Kentucky House of Representatives from 1995 to 1999. Murgatroyd was first elected in 1994 after incumbent representative Kenneth F. Harper retired. In 1998 he was elected Judge/Executive of Kenton County. He resigned in January 2004 in order to join the administration of governor Ernie Fletcher.
