= Jon Draud =

American politician

Kenton County Commissioner from the 2nd district
- Incumbent
- Assumed office January 3, 2011
- Preceded by: Sara Voelker

4th Kentucky Commissioner of Education
- In office December 3, 2007 – January 31, 2009
- Preceded by: Gene Wilhoit
- Succeeded by: Elaine Farris (interim)

Member of the Kentucky House of Representatives from the 63rd district
- In office January 1, 1999 – December 2, 2007
- Preceded by: Richard Murgatroyd
- Succeeded by: Alecia Webb-Edgington

Personal details
- Born: September 18, 1939 (age 86) Covington, Kentucky
- Party: Democratic (before 1990s); Republican (after 1990s)
- Children: 3
- Education: Eastern Kentucky University (BA, MA); Xavier University (MA); University of Cincinnati (EdD)
- Occupation: Educator (retired)

Jon Edward Draud (born September 18, 1938) is an American educator and politician from Kentucky who has served as a member of the Kenton County Commission since 2011.

He previously served as a member of the Kentucky House of Representatives from 1999 to 2007, representing Kentucky's 63rd House district. He also served as the Kentucky Commissioner of Education from 2007 to 2009.

== Early life and education ==
Draud was born on September 18, 1938, in Covington, Kentucky. Raised in Kenton County, he graduated from Ludlow High School in 1956, and went on to attend Eastern Kentucky State College (now Eastern Kentucky University) on a football and baseball scholarship. He played four seasons for the Eastern Maroons baseball team under coach Turkey Hughes, and was the teams's co-captain during his senior year.

After graduating from Eastern in 1960 with Bachelor of Arts degrees in history and physical education, Draud spent one year as a teacher for Covington Public Schools before returning to Eastern as a graduate assistant baseball coach for the 1962 season. Afterwards, he returned to Covington Public Schools where he taught American government and was a baseball coach at Covington Holmes High School, leading them to their win at the 1963 Kentucky state high school baseball championship.

He also received a Master of Arts degree in school administration from Eastern, a Master of Arts degree in political science from Xavier University, and a Doctor of Educational Leadership degree with a minor in public policy from the University of Cincinnati in 1978.

== Career ==
In 1966, Draud left Holmes High School to be principle of Covington's Third District School. During this time, he served on the Crestview Hills city council for five years. From 1978 to 1997, he served as superintendent of the Ludlow Independent Schools district.

Instead of seeking reelection in 1998, incumbent Richard Murgatroyd of Kentucky's 63rd House district chose to run for Judge/Executive of Kenton County. Draud won the 1998 Republican primary with 1,546 votes (45.36%) against John Clyde Middleton, the son of state senator Clyde Middleton, and John Link, the mayor of Edgewood. Draud went on to win the 1998 Kentucky House of Representatives election unopposed. During his tenure, Draud served as vice chair of the House Education committee. In 1999, Republican leaders attempted to recruit Draud to challenge incumbent Representative Ken Lucas of Kentucky's 4th Congressional District. However, he declined, citing his short tenure and desire to remain in the state legislature.

Following the resignation of Commissioner Gene Wilhoit to become the executive director of the Council of Chief State School Officers, the Kentucky Board of Education initially selected Illinois educator Barbara Erwin as the next Kentucky commissioner of education. However, Erwin resigned from the position before she assumed office following questions about her leadership in previous districts and errors in her resume. Governor-elect Steve Beshear requested the board to conduct a new national search but the board declined, instead unanimously choosing Draud to be the next commissioner out of the remaining four finalists. He resigned from the Kentucky House on December 2, 2007, and assumed the office of commissioner on the next day under a four-year contract.

In September 2008, Draud suffered a mild stroke which affected his mobility, and only allowed him to work three days a week. Subsequently, Draud resigned as commissioner on January 31, 2009, for health reasons.

In 2010, Draud was elected as a member of the Kenton County Commission, representing the county's 2nd district. In January 2026, he announced that he would not be seeking reelection.

== Personal life and honors ==
Draud and his wife reside in Edgewood.

The Dr. Jon E. Draud Administrative Building of Ludlow Independent Schools is named after him. In 2000, Draud was chosen by Eastern Kentucky University as that year's recipient of their Most Outstanding Alumnus Award. In 2009, he was Eastern's spring commencement speaker, and was awarded an honorary doctor of humanities degree. In 2024, he received a lifetime achievement award from the Northern Kentucky Education Council.
