= Leila Feltner Begley =

American politician (1915–2010)

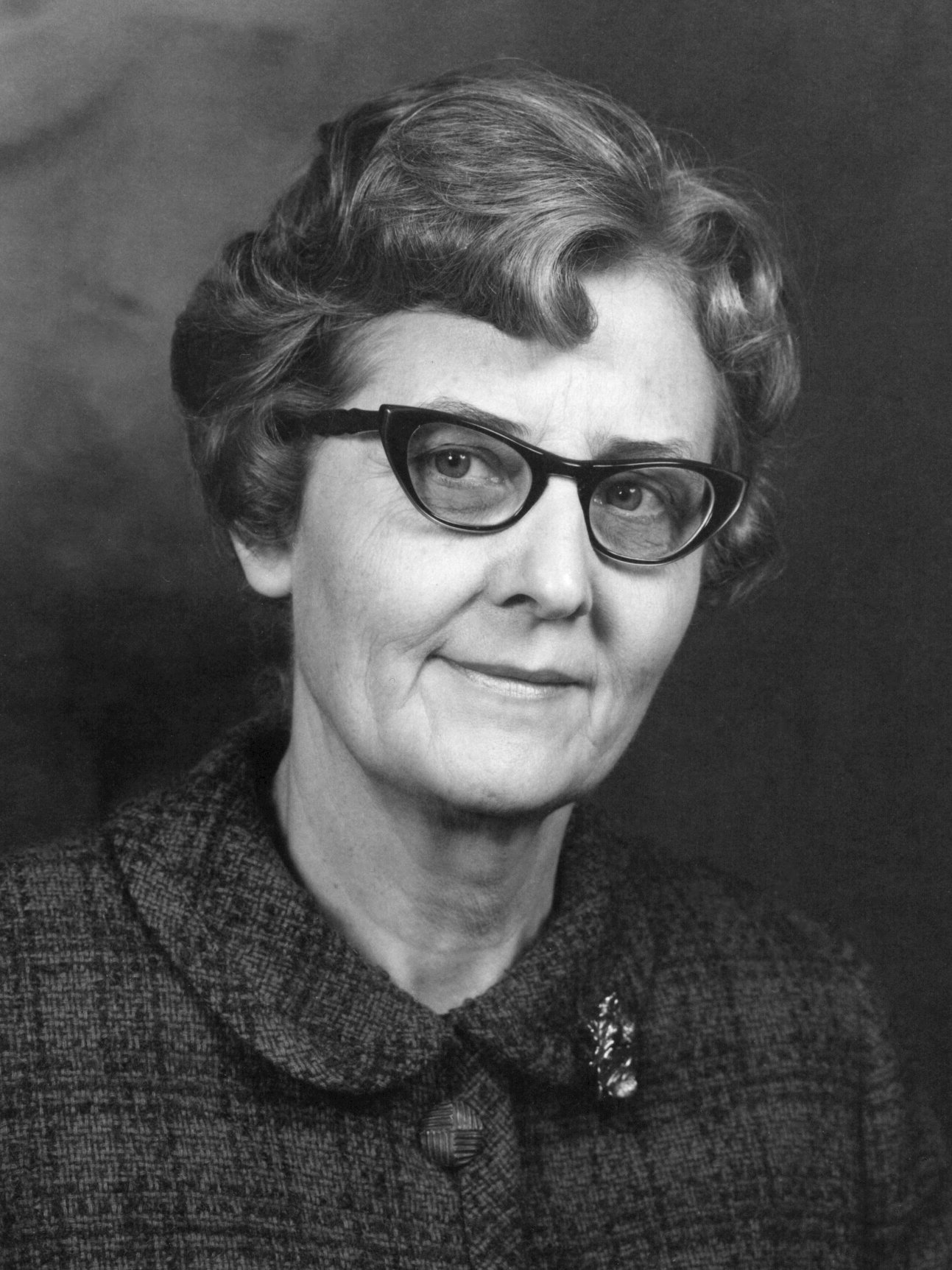

75th Secretary of State of Kentucky
- In office September 21, 1970 – February 2, 1971
- Governor: Louie Nunn
- Preceded by: Elmer Begley
- Succeeded by: Kenneth F. Harper

Personal details
- Born: Leila Feltner; January 5, 1915 Hyden, Kentucky
- Died: May 9, 2010 (aged 95) Scottsburg, Indiana
- Party: Republican
- Spouse: Elmer Begley (m. 1941)
- Children: 3
- Parent(s): Felix C. Feltner; Ona (Maggard) Feltner
- Education: Eastern Kentucky University

Leila Feltner Begley (née Feltner; January 5, 1915 – May 9, 2010) was an American politician and educator who served as secretary of state of Kentucky from 1970 until her resignation in 1971. She was a member of the Republican Party.

== Early life and education ==
Begley was born on January 5, 1915, in Hyden, Kentucky, as the daughter of Felix C. and Ona (Maggard) Feltner. She attended Buckhorn High School in Buckhorn, Kentucky and Eastern Kentucky University in Richmond. She married Elmer Begley in 1941, they had 3 children.

== Career ==
After graduating from Eastern Kentucky University, Begley worked as a home economics teacher for 30 years. When her husband, Elmer, was elected secretary of state of Kentucky in 1968, he appointed her to be assistant secretary of state.

=== Secretary of state of Kentucky ===
Following the death of her husband, Elmer, on September 18, 1970, Governor Louie Nunn appointed her to be secretary of state, a position she would hold until her resignation on February 2, 1971. After her resignation, she again assumed the role of assistant secretary of state.

== Later life ==
Begley moved from her residence in Hyden, Kentucky to Austin, Indiana in 1975. She died on May 9, 2010, at Scott Memorial Hospital in Scottsburg, Indiana, at the age of 95.
