= Ohio River Basin Congressional Caucus =

- Republican Co-Chair: Sen. Shelley Moore Capito (R-WV)
- Democratic Co-Chair: Rep. John Yarmuth (D) (KY-3)
- Political position: Bipartisan
- Colors: None Official (Gray Unofficial)
- Seats in the Senate: 2 / 28
- Seats in the House: 15 / 55

The Ohio River Basin Congressional Caucus, also known as the Congressional Ohio River Basin Caucus and the Ohio River Basin Caucus, is a Congressional Member Organization dedicated to addressing the critical economic, infrastructure, agricultural, environmental, and community issues within the Ohio River Basin.

== History ==
The caucus was founded on October 21, 2009, by then Rep. Shelley Moore Capito and Rep. Steve Driehaus in order to unite all members of Congress whose districts reside within the Ohio River Basin to work together to resolve issues faced by their constituents.

The caucus was formed in conjunction with the Ohio River Valley Water Sanitation Commission, which is an organization that was formed by multiple state governments to manage and maintain the environmental quality of the Ohio River Valley.

== Members ==
While all Congressional Caucuses work to recruit additional members who support their particular goals, The Ohio River Basin Caucus is unique in that it makes no attempt to recruit any member of Congress whose Congressional district does not fall within the boundary of the Ohio River Basin. Under this policy, membership for the Caucus is capped at fifty-five members of the House of Representatives and twenty-eight Senators.

=== Current members ===
Congressional Ohio River Basin Caucus in the 118th United States Congress

Membership is as of the 118th Congress.

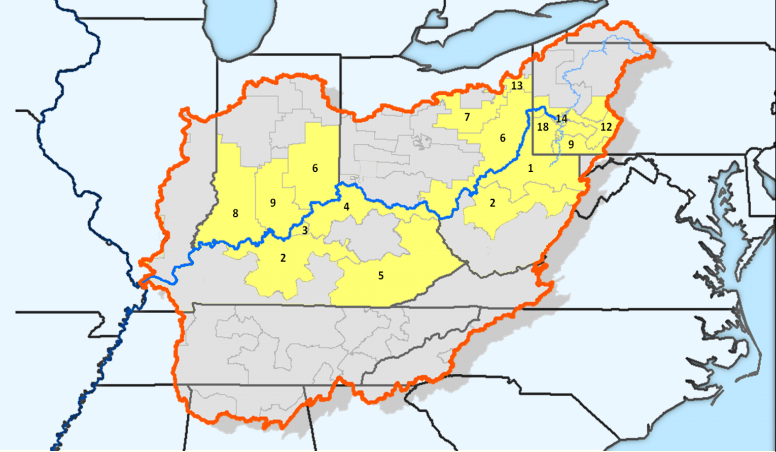
Districts Represented by the Ohio River Basin Caucus in the 115th Congress

- Rep. Larry Bucshon (R‑IN‑8)
- Rep. Brett Guthrie (R‑KY‑2)
- Rep. Thomas Massie (R‑KY‑4)
- Rep. Hal Rogers (R‑KY‑5)
- Rep. Brad Wenstrup (R‑OH‑2)
- Rep. Bill Johnson (R‑OH‑6)
- Rep. Troy Balderson (R‑OH‑12)

=== Former members ===
- Fmr. Rep. Steve Driehaus (D‑OH‑1)- Defeated in the 2010 General Election.
- Fmr. Rep. William Enyart- (D‑IL‑12)- Defeated in the 2014 General Election.
- Fmr. Rep. Nick Rahall (D‑WV‑3)- Defeated in the 2014 General Election.
- Fmr. Rep. Ed Whitfield (R‑KY‑1)- Resigned on September 6, 2016.
- Fmr. Rep. Tim Murphy (R‑PA‑18)- Resigned on October 21, 2017.
- Fmr. Rep. Luke Messer (R‑IN‑6)- Retired in 2018.
- Fmr. Rep. Bill Shuster (R‑PA‑9)- Retired in 2018.
- Fmr. Rep. Keith Rothfus (R‑PA‑12)- Defeated in 2018 General Election.
- Fmr. Rep. Steve Chabot (R‑OH‑1)- Defeated in 2022 General Election.
- Fmr. Rep. Bob Gibbs (R‑OH‑7)- Retired in 2022.
- Fmr. Rep. Tim Ryan (D‑OH‑13)- Retired in 2022.
- Fmr. Rep. Michael F. Doyle (D‑PA‑17)- Retired in 2022.
- Fmr. Rep. David McKinley (R‑WV‑1)- Lost renomination in 2022 due to redistricting.
- Fmr. Rep. John Yarmuth (D‑KY‑3)- Retired in 2022.
- Sen. Shelley Moore Capito (R-WV)
- Sen. Todd Young (R-IN)

== Political activities ==
=== Indiana Ohio River Basin Caucus ===
The Congressional Ohio River Basin Caucus has routinely worked closely with the Indiana Ohio River Basin Caucus, which exists within the Indiana House of Representatives. Specifically, they have worked together to enact environmental protection laws along Indiana's border with the city of Louisville, Kentucky.
