= Alecia Webb-Edgington =

American politician (born 1966)

Member of the Kentucky House of Representatives from the 63rd district
- In office January 14, 2008 – January 1, 2013
- Preceded by: Jon Draud
- Succeeded by: Diane St. Onge

Personal details
- Born: August 23, 1966 (age 60)
- Party: Republican
- Education: Western Kentucky University, B.A. Eastern Kentucky University, M.S.
- Occupation: Police officer

Alecia Webb-Edgington is an American politician. She is a former Republican member of the Kentucky House of Representatives. She represented the 63rd District, which comprised part of Kenton County. Webb-Edgington was a candidate for the United States House of Representatives in the 2012 election. She sought to replace the retiring Geoff Davis in Kentucky's 4th congressional district, but was defeated by Lewis County Judge-Executive Thomas Massie.

== Early life, education, and law enforcement career ==
She earned a bachelor's degree from Western Kentucky University in sociology and criminology followed by a master's degree from Eastern Kentucky University in criminal justice. She also went to the 52nd Annual National Security Seminar at the U.S. Army War College and the Executive Leadership Program at the Naval Postgraduate School.

She worked for the Kentucky State Police as the chief information officer and for the Kentucky Office of Homeland Security, where she became the first female head of the office.

== Kentucky House of Representatives ==
=== Elections ===
In December 2007, incumbent Republican State Representative Jon Draud of the 63rd House District resigned his seat to become Kentucky Education Commissioner. She won the January 8th special election with 53% of the vote. She won re-election unopposed in 2008 and 2010.

=== Committee assignments ===
2011-2012

- Appropriations and Revenue Committee
- Education Committee
- State Government Committee
- Transportation Committee
- Veterans, Military Affairs and Public Safety Committee
- Appropriations and Revenue Committee
- Education Committee
- State Government Committee
- Transportation Committee
- Veterans, Military Affairs and Public Protection Committee

2009-2010

- Education Committee (Vice Chair)
- Interim Joint Committee on Education
- Interim Joint Committee on State Government
- Interim Joint Committee on Transportation
- Interim Joint Committee on Veterans, Military Affairs & Public Protectio
- Military Affairs and Public Safety Committee
- State Government Committee
  - Subcommittee of Budget Review on Justice and Judiciary
  - Subcommittee on Elementary and Secondary Education
  - Subcommittee on Kentucky Waterways
- Transportation Committee

== 2012 congressional election ==
After incumbent Republican U.S. Congressman Geoff Davis decided to retire, she decided to run in the newly redrawn Kentucky's 4th congressional district. She said "Congressman Geoff Davis leaves big shoes to fill. I applaud him for his effective leadership and wish him well as he returns to the private sector."

She was defeated by Thomas Massie during the GOP Primary, failing to garner more than 30% of the vote.
