= Mellman =

Mellman is a surname. Notable people with the surname include:

- Grace Mellman, American namesake of the Grace Mellman Community Library
- Ira Mellman (fl. 1976–present), American cell biologist
- Kenny Mellman (fl. 1989–present), American musician
- Mark Mellman (fl. 1981–2025), American political strategist on Israel

== See also ==
- Ken Mehlman (born 1966), American politician and businessperson
