= Elmer Begley =

American politician (1912–1970)

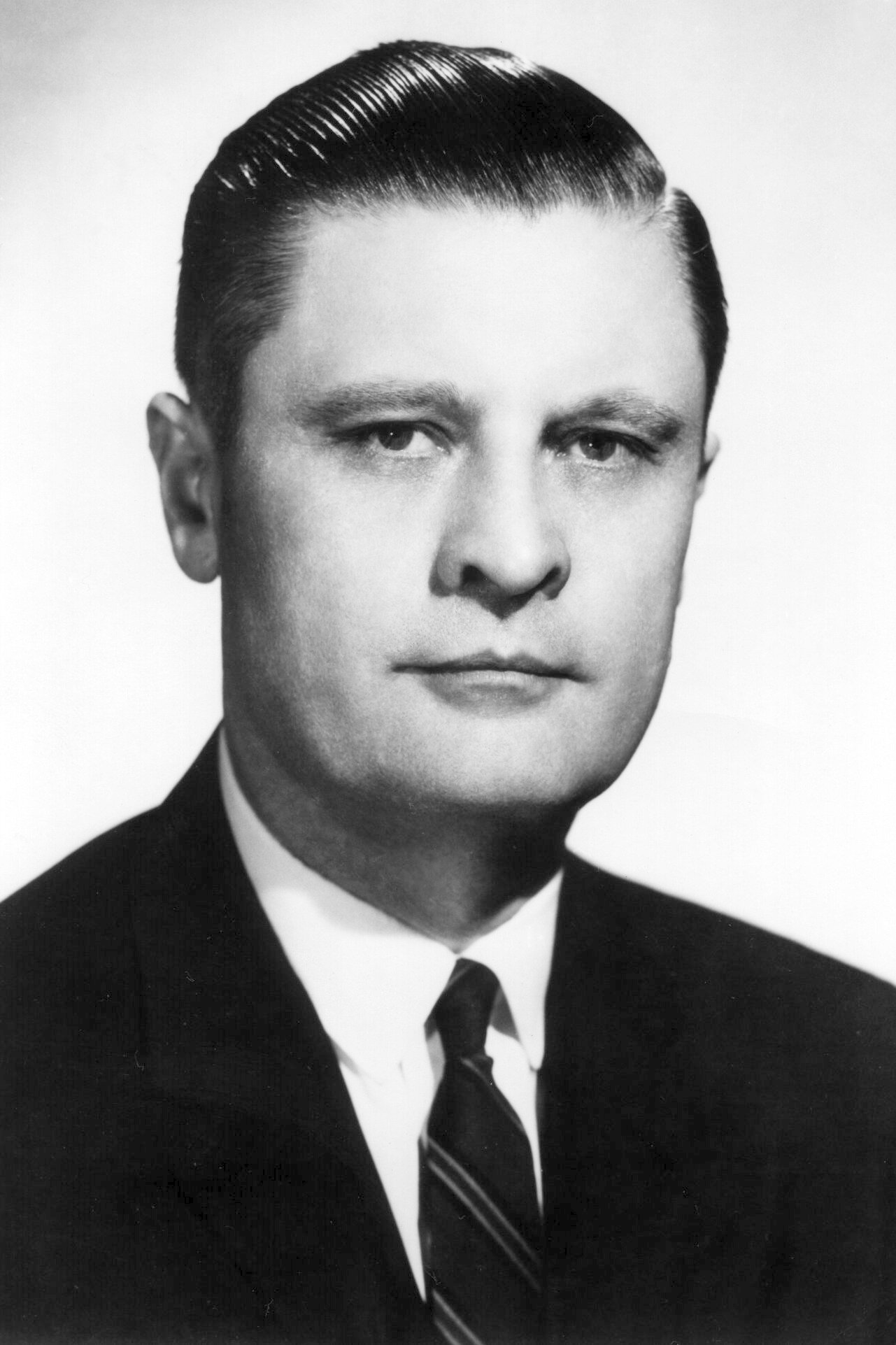
- Begley in 1967

73rd Secretary of State of Kentucky
- In office January 1, 1968 – September 18, 1970
- Governor: Louie Nunn
- Preceded by: Thelma Stovall
- Succeeded by: Leila Feltner Begley

Personal details
- Born: July 5, 1912 Leslie County, Kentucky, U.S.
- Died: September 18, 1970 (aged 58) Lexington, Kentucky, U.S.
- Party: Republican
- Spouse: Leila Feltner Begley (m. 1941)
- Children: 3
- Parent(s): Ira Begley; Mary Jane Begley
- Education: Eastern Kentucky University; Morehead State University

Elmer Begley (July 5, 1912 – September 18, 1970) was an American politician and educator who served as Secretary of State of Kentucky from 1968 to his death in 1970.

== Early life and education ==
Begley was born in Leslie County, Kentucky, as the son of Ira and Mary Jane Begley. He attended Eastern Kentucky University and Morehead State University. In 1941, he married Leila Feltner Begley, with whom he had 3 children.

== Career ==
Begley worked as a high school teacher and football coach for two years, and served as a principal in a Leslie County elementary school for nine years. From 1943 to 1944, he served as director of the Federal Farm Security program for Leslie and Perry counties.

=== Political career ===
Early in life, Begley decided he wanted to follow in his grandfather's footsteps and become a County Judge. At age twenty-four he was elected to serve as Leslie County Judge, an office that he would hold for four consecutive terms. In 1967, he was elected to serve as Secretary of State of Kentucky on a ticket headed by governor of Kentucky, Louie Nunn. He appointed his wife, Leila, to serve as Assistant Secretary of State.

== Death ==
Begley died of cancer at his apartment in Lexington, Kentucky on September 18, 1970, while still serving as Secretary of State. Governor Louie Nunn appointed his wife, Leila, to fill his position.
