= John Yarmuth =

American politician (born 1947)

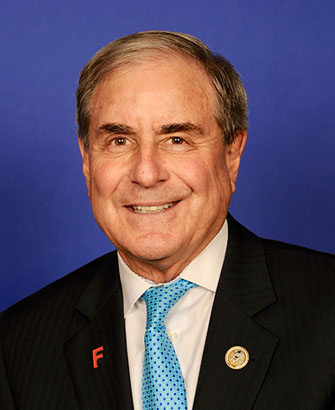
- Official portrait, 2018

Chair of the House Budget Committee
- In office January 3, 2019 – January 3, 2023
- Preceded by: Steve Womack
- Succeeded by: Jodey Arrington

Member of the U.S. House of Representatives from Kentucky's 3rd district
- In office January 3, 2007 – January 3, 2023
- Preceded by: Anne Northup
- Succeeded by: Morgan McGarvey

Personal details
- Born: John Allan Yarmuth; November 4, 1947 (age 79) Louisville, Kentucky, U.S.
- Party: Republican (before 1985); Democratic (1985–present)
- Spouse: Catherine Creedon (m. 1981)
- Children: 1
- Education: Yale University (BA)
- Yarmuth's voice Yarmuth supporting the American Rescue Plan. Recorded February 26, 2021

John Allan Yarmuth (/ˈjɑːrmɪθ/ YAR-mith; born November 4, 1947) is a retired American politician and newspaper editor who served as the U.S. representative for Kentucky's 3rd congressional district from 2007 to 2023. His district encompassed the vast majority of Louisville, Kentucky, which has shared the same borders with Jefferson County following a city-county merger in 2003. From 2013 onward, he had been the sole Democratic member of Kentucky's congressional delegation. Yarmuth chaired the House Budget Committee from 2019 to 2023. On October 12, 2021, he announced that he would not seek reelection in 2022.

== Early life and education ==
Yarmuth was born in Louisville, Kentucky, the son of Edna E. (née Klein) and Stanley R. Yarmuth. He is descended from Jewish immigrants from Russia and Austria. He graduated from Atherton High School. He later graduated from Yale University, majoring in American studies.

== Early career ==
Yarmuth worked as a legislative aide for Republican U.S. Senator Marlow Cook from 1971 to 1974, then returned to Louisville and launched his publishing career by founding Louisville Today, a magazine which operated from 1976 to 1982. He later worked as a vice president of university relations at the University of Louisville from 1983 to 1986, where he was inducted into Omicron Delta Kappa as an honoris causa initiate in 2014. In 1971, while Yarmuth was working for Senator Cook, he posed as a pin-up model for an April Fool's edition of Roll Call.

Yarmuth described himself as a Rockefeller Republican in his earlier years. He left the party during Ronald Reagan's presidency, saying, "I saw this unmistakable move away from moderation when he started hosting Jerry Falwell and Pat Robertson and catering to the religious right".

In 1990, Yarmuth founded the Louisville Eccentric Observer (LEO), a weekly newspaper for which he wrote a generally liberal political column that usually ran on page one. In 2003, he sold LEO to a company owned by Times Publishing Company of Pennsylvania, owner of the Erie Times-News. Yarmuth remained on board as a columnist and consultant until January 2006, when he put his column on hiatus to run for Congress.

== U.S. House of Representatives ==
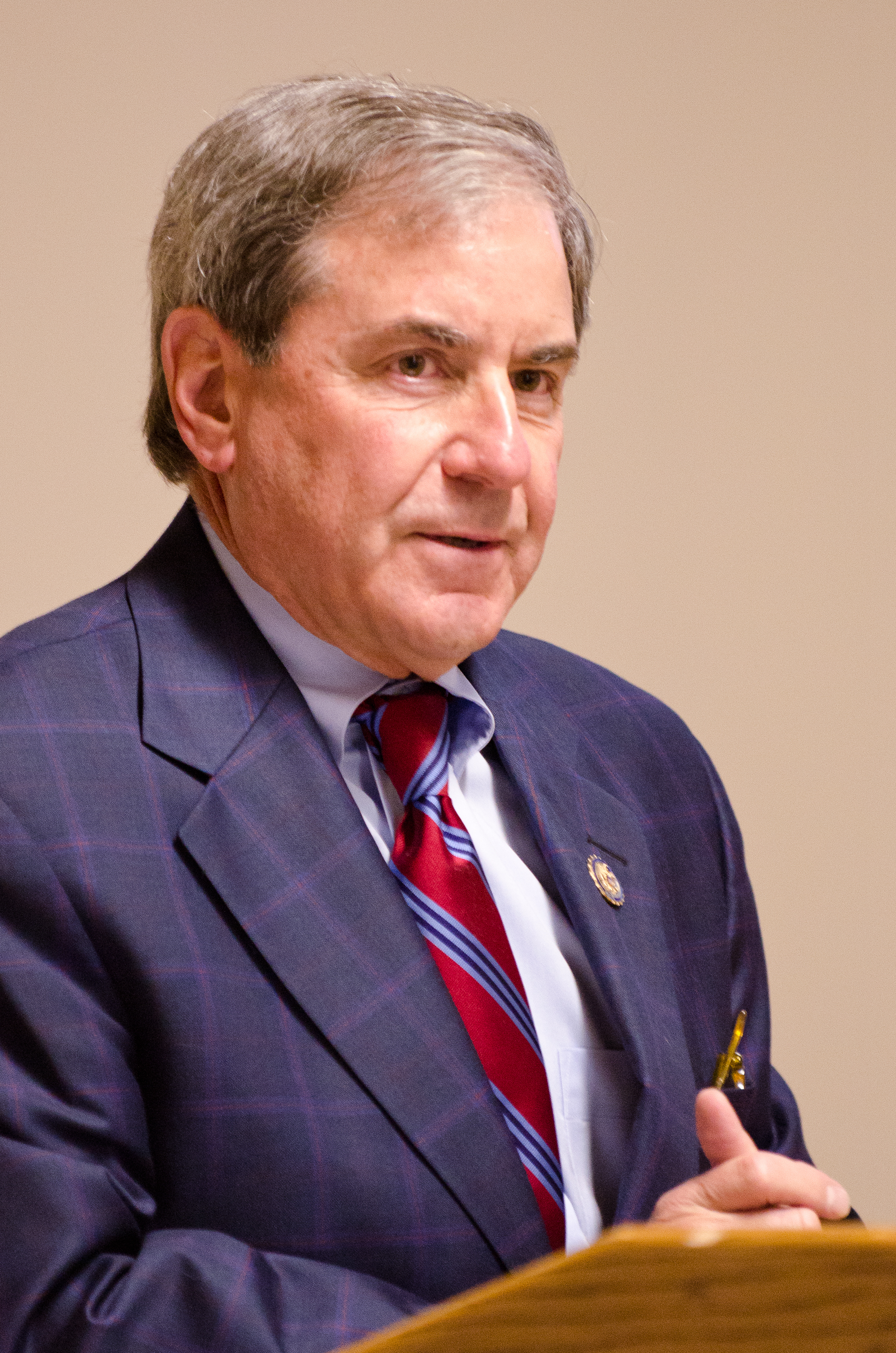
Yarmuth in May 2011

=== Elections ===
==== 2006 ====
On January 31, 2006, Yarmuth filed candidacy papers to represent Kentucky's 3rd congressional district. He won the Democratic primary on May 16, defeating Andrew Horne, Burrell Charles Farnsley and James W. Moore, and defeated incumbent Anne Northup in the November general election.

On August 7, 2006, The Courier-Journal reported that The Hill revealed a week before that the Democratic Congressional Campaign Committee had earmarked $51.5 million for television advertising in 32 congressional districts across the nation, but none for Yarmuth's challenge in the third congressional district.

On October 20, a Courier-Journal article stated that a WHAS11/SurveyUSA poll revealed the race had tightened dramatically, with Yarmuth leading Northup 48% to 47%. Another poll a month earlier had Northup leading by 6 points. A WHAS11/SurveyUSA poll released on November 2 showed Yarmuth leading Northup 52% to 44%.

On October 26, Yarmuth told Courier-Journal reporter Kay Stewart that he would donate his congressional salary—which would be $168,500 in 2007—to local charity.

Because polls close early in Kentucky, many analysts saw this race as a key indicator and it immediately became one of the most watched House races in the nation. Yarmuth received 122,139 votes (51%) to Northup's 116,157 (48%). Independent candidates garnered 2,896 (1%).

==== 2008 ====
Yarmuth ran unopposed in the primary, and faced Northup again in the general election. He won with 59% of the vote.

==== 2010 ====
Yarmuth was challenged by Republican Todd Lally and Independent Michael D. Hansen. He was reelected with 55% of the vote.

==== 2012 ====
Yarmuth was challenged by Republican Brooks Wicker and Independent candidate Robert L. Devore Jr. Yarmuth received 206,385 votes (63.96%) to Wicker's 111,452 (23.32%) and Devore's 4,819 (1.49%).

==== 2014 ====
In the 2014 general election, Yarmuth was challenged by Republican Michael McFarlane and Independent Gregory Puccetti. On October 6, 2014, Kentucky Educational Television hosted a debate that was broadcast live on Louisville's KET, and was moderated by KET host Bill Goodman. Yarmuth was reelected with 63.5% of the vote.

==== 2016 ====
Yarmuth was challenged by Republican Harold Bratcher and Independent Everett Corley. He won with 212,388 votes (63%) of the vote to Bratcher's 122,085 (37%). Corley received no votes.

==== 2018 ====
On April 17, 2017, Yarmuth announced that his candidacy for reelection in the 2018 election. During the campaign, he lobbied for the chairship of the House Budget Committee and promised to hold hearings on Medicare for all. Yarmuth was reelected with over 62% of the vote against Vickie Yates Glisson, Kentucky's former Secretary of Health and Family Services. After the Democrats took the House, Yarmuth became Budget Committee chair. In that position, he requested documents pertaining to the withholding of appropriated defense funds to Ukraine.

==== 2020 ====
Yarmuth was reelected to an eighth and final term with 62% of vote against Republican Rhonda Palazzo.

=== Tenure ===
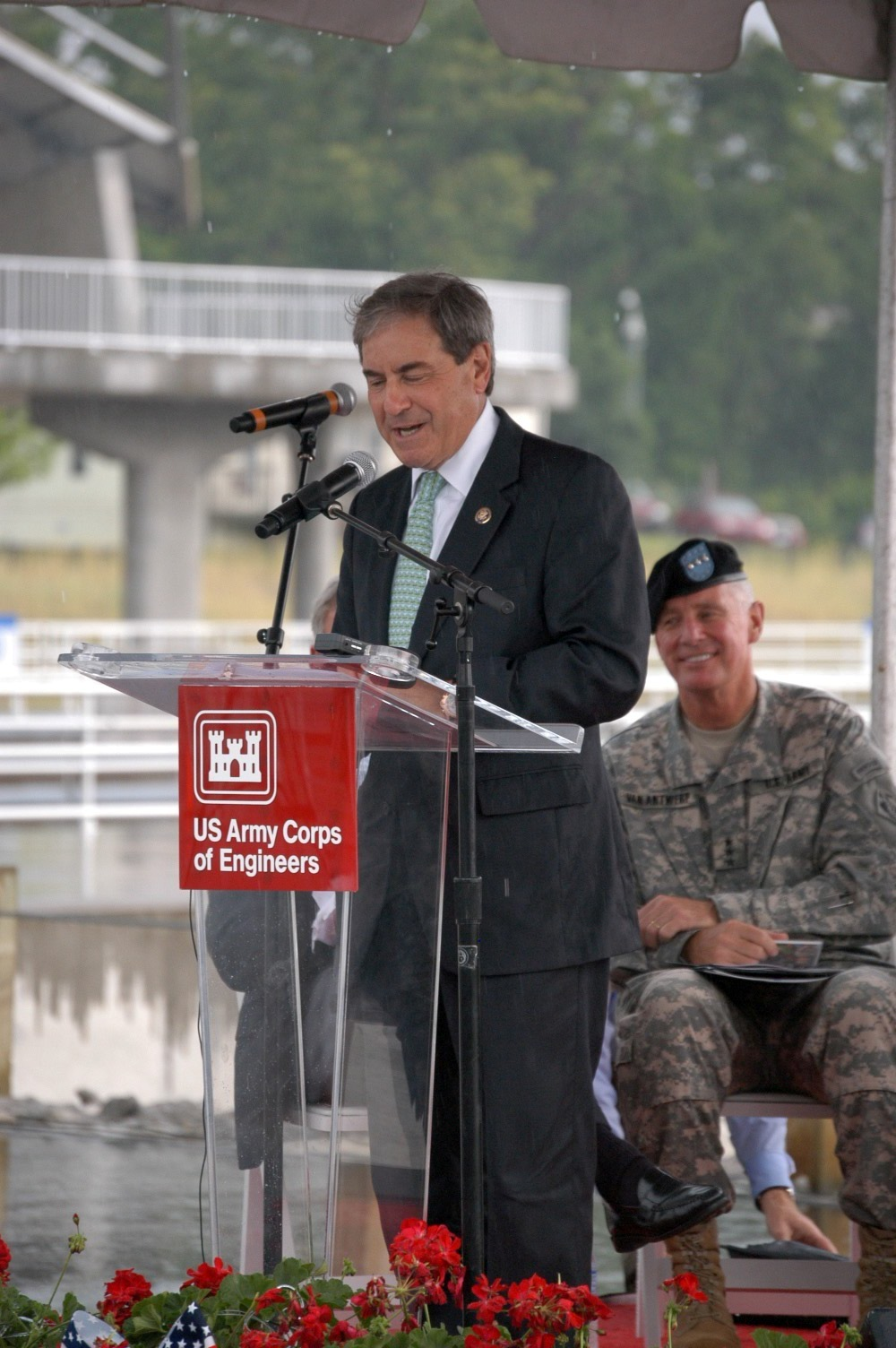
Yarmuth in 2009.

Yarmuth took office on January 3, 2007.

After his first year in Congress, Yarmuth donated his post-tax congressional salary of just over $120,000 to various Louisville charities.

On February 8, 2008, Yarmuth endorsed Barack Obama for the Democratic nomination for President of the United States.

On September 29, 2008, Yarmuth voted against the TARP bailout plan, as negotiated by House Speaker Nancy Pelosi, Senate Majority Leader Harry Reid, President George W. Bush, House Minority Leader John Boehner, and Senate Minority Leader Mitch McConnell. He voted for the second version of the bailout bill.

Yarmuth said he was so "nauseated" by a moment of silence for Michael Jackson on the House floor that he left the chamber. "I thought it was outrageous," he said. "In my two and a half years, we've not done this for anybody else. We've done it for former members and that's about it."

After winning a 2008 rematch with Anne Northup, his 2006 general election opponent, Yarmuth was rewarded by the Democratic Steering and Policy Committee with a spot on the influential Ways and Means Committee. On the committee, he worked on issues on which he campaigned before the 2008 election: Social Security, pension, Medicare, and Medicaid issues.

At a September 2009 town hall meeting, constituents were unhappy with Yarmuth's decision to support the Patient Protection and Affordable Care Act. "Yarmuth stayed calm in the face of boos and catcalls from some in the audience" according to an Associated Press report. "He warned that the current health care system is an unsustainable drain on businesses and the nation's economy."

In 2011, Yarmuth and Walter Jones introduced a bill to overturn key parts of the controversial court case Citizens United v. FEC. The legislation would also give Congress the power to enact mandatory public financing for Congressional candidates and create a national holiday for voting purposes.

In 2011, Yarmuth voted against the National Defense Authorization Act for Fiscal Year 2012 due to a controversial provision that allows the government and the military to indefinitely detain American citizens and others without trial.

In 2013, Yarmuth introduced the Fair Elections Now Act, which would establish a public financing system for Congressional campaigns.

In 2015, Yarmuth once again made an attempt at removing "dark money" from the political sphere by proposing HR 2125, the Keeping our Campaigns Honest Act of 2015.

Yarmuth signed onto a "Medicare for All" bill along with 120 other House Democrats in 2018, supporting single-payer healthcare.

Yarmuth became the first Kentuckian to join the Congressional Progressive Caucus.

On December 18, 2019, Yarmuth voted for both articles of impeachment against President Donald Trump, the only House member from Kentucky to do so.

For his tenure as the chairman of the House Budget Committee in the 116th Congress, Yarmuth earned an "A" grade from the nonpartisan Lugar Center's Congressional Oversight Hearing Index.

In 2021, Yarmuth introduced to the House the American Rescue Plan Act of 2021, President Joe Biden's first major piece of legislation.

On October 12, 2021, Yarmuth announced that he will retire from Congress at the end of his term in 2023.

=== Committee assignments ===
- Committee on the Budget (chair)
- Committee on Education and Labor

=== Party leadership ===
- Regional Whip

=== Caucus memberships ===
Yarmuth's caucus memberships include:

- Ohio River Basin Congressional Caucus (Co-chair)
- Populist Caucus
- Congressional Steel Caucus
- Congressional Bike Caucus
- Congressional Arts Caucus
- Congressional Progressive Caucus
- Climate Solutions Caucus
- Medicare for All Caucus
- Blue Collar Caucus
- House Pro-Choice Caucus

== Electoral history ==
Kentucky 3rd Congressional District Democratic Primary, 2006
Party	Candidate	Votes	%
Democratic	John Yarmuth	30,962	53.82
Democratic	Andrew Horne	18,662	32.44
Democratic	James Walter Moore	4,582	7.96
Democratic	Burrel Charles Farnsley	3,322	5.77
Total votes		57,528	100.0

Kentucky 3rd Congressional District General Election, 2006
Party	Candidate	Votes	%
Democratic	John Yarmuth	122,489	50.62
Republican	Anne M. Northup (incumbent)	116,568	48.18
Libertarian	Donna Walker Mancini	2,134	0.88
Constitution	W. Ed Parker	774	0.32
Total votes		241,965	100.0

Kentucky 3rd Congressional District General Election, 2008
Party	Candidate	Votes	%
Democratic	John Yarmuth (incumbent)	203,843	59.37
Republican	Anne M. Northup	139,527	40.63
Total votes		343,370	100.0

Kentucky 3rd Congressional District General Election, 2010
Party	Candidate	Votes	%
Democratic	John Yarmuth (incumbent)	139,940	54.68
Republican	Todd Lally	112,627	44.01
Libertarian	Edward A. Martin	2,029	0.79
Independent	Michael D. Hansen	1,334	0.52
Total votes		255,930	100.0

Kentucky 3rd Congressional District Democratic Primary, 2012
Party	Candidate	Votes	%
Democratic	John Yarmuth (incumbent)	43,635	86.66
Democratic	Burrel Charles Farnsley	6,716	13.34
Total votes		50,351	100.0

Kentucky 3rd Congressional District General Election, 2012
Party	Candidate	Votes	%
Democratic	John Yarmuth (incumbent)	206,385	63.96
Republican	Brooks Wicker	111,452	34.54
Independent	Robert L. DeVore Jr.	4,819	1.49
Total votes		322,656	100.0

Kentucky 3rd Congressional District Democratic Primary, 2014
Party	Candidate	Votes	%
Democratic	John Yarmuth (incumbent)	52,026	87.04
Democratic	E. Ray Pierce	7,747	12.96
Total votes		59,773	100.0

Kentucky 3rd Congressional District General Election, 2014
Party	Candidate	Votes	%
Democratic	John Yarmuth (incumbent)	157,056	63.49
Republican	Michael Macfarlane	87,981	35.57
Independent	Gregory Peter Puccetti	2,318	0.94
Total votes		247,355	100.0

Kentucky 3rd Congressional District General Election, 2016
Party	Candidate	Votes	%
Democratic	John Yarmuth (incumbent)	212,401	63.50
Republican	Harold Bratcher	122,093	36.50
Total votes		334,494	100.0

Kentucky 3rd Congressional District General Election, 2018
Party	Candidate	Votes	%
Democratic	John Yarmuth (incumbent)	173,002	62.01
Republican	Vickie Yates B. Glisson	101,930	36.06
Libertarian	Gregory Boles	3,788	1.04
Total votes		278,720	100.0

Kentucky 3rd Congressional District General Election, 2020
Party	Candidate	Votes	%
Democratic	John Yarmuth (incumbent)	230,672	62.07
Republican	Rhonda Palazzo	137,425	37.07
Total votes		368,097	100.0

== Television ==
In 2003, Yarmuth and former WHAS-AM radio talk show host John Ziegler debated political issues on the weekly WAVE program Yarmuth & Ziegler, with Yarmuth taking the liberal side and Ziegler the conservative side. On a successor program, Hot Button, which ran from September 2004 to December 2005, he faced off with conservative Jim Milliman.

Yarmuth appeared on the March 8, 2007, episode of The Colbert Report in the show's "Better Know a District" series. In a parody of Yarmuth's former Yarmuth & Ziegler debate series, host Stephen Colbert prodded Yarmuth into a point/counterpoint style debate. After agreeing to the "debate", Colbert forced Yarmuth to defend the shredding of kittens in wood chippers, which Yarmuth gamely proceeded to do. Colbert called Yarmuth a real-life Bruce Wayne, and presented him with a framed print of his congressional photo with a Batman mask photoshopped over his face.

== Personal life ==
Yarmuth has served on many boards, including the Bingham Child Guidance Center and Kentucky Country Day School. He is Kentucky's first Jewish congressman. Yarmuth and his wife, Cathy Yarmuth, have one son, Aaron, who was the owner of the Louisville Eccentric Observer, as he among a group of local investors purchased the publication in 2012. In May 2021 it was sold to the Euclid Media Group.

== See also ==
- List of Jewish members of the United States Congress

U.S. House of Representatives
Preceded by Anne Northup	Member of the U.S. House of Representatives from Kentucky's 3rd congressional district 2007–2023	Succeeded by Morgan McGarvey
Preceded by Chris Van Hollen	Ranking Member of the House Budget Committee; 2017–2019	Succeeded by Steve Womack
Preceded by Steve Womack	Chair of the House Budget Committee; 2019–2023	Succeeded by Jodey Arrington
U.S. order of precedence (ceremonial)
Preceded by Patrick J. Kennedy as Former U.S. Representative	Order of precedence of the United States as Former U.S. Representative	Succeeded by Zach Wamp as Former U.S. Representative
