= National Register of Historic Places listings in Grant County, Kentucky =

Location of Grant County in Kentucky

This is a list of the National Register of Historic Places listings in Grant County, Kentucky.

It is intended to be a complete list of the properties on the National Register of Historic Places in Grant County, Kentucky, United States. The locations of National Register properties for which the latitude and longitude coordinates are included below, may be seen in a map.

There are 3 properties listed on the National Register in the county.

This National Park Service list is complete through NPS recent listings posted December 12, 2025.

== Current listings ==
	Name on the Register	Image	Date listed	Location	City or town	Description
1	Ford Stone House	Ford Stone House	February 27, 1980 (#80001532)	South of Elliston; 38°43′00″N 84°44′59″W	Elliston	
2	Independent Order of Odd Fellows Hall	Independent Order of Odd Fellows Hall	April 21, 2025 (#100011687)	113 N. Main Street; 38°38′14″N 84°33′38″W	Williamstown	
3	Sherman Tavern	Sherman Tavern	February 9, 1979 (#79000990)	South of Sherman on U.S. Route 25; 38°43′32″N 84°35′54″W	Sherman	

== See also ==
- List of National Historic Landmarks in Kentucky
- National Register of Historic Places listings in Kentucky
