= George Baird Hodge =

American politician

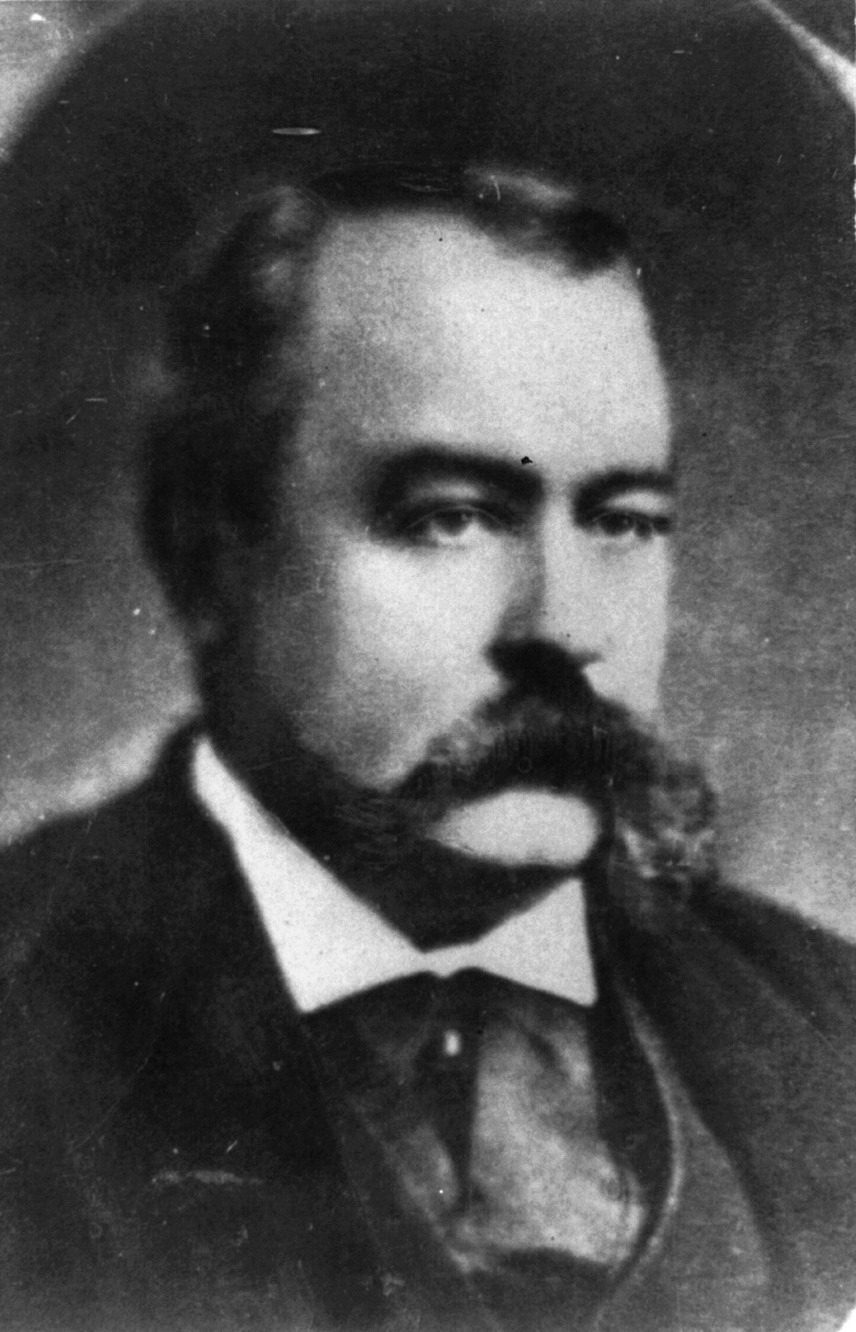
- Born: April 8, 1828; Fleming County, Kentucky, U.S.
- Died: August 1, 1892 (aged 64); Longwood, Florida, U.S.
- Burial place: Evergreen Cemetery, Southgate, Kentucky
- Military career
- Allegiance: United States of America; Confederate States of America
- Branch: United States Navy; Confederate States Army
- Service years: 1845–1850 (USN); 1861–1865 (CSA)
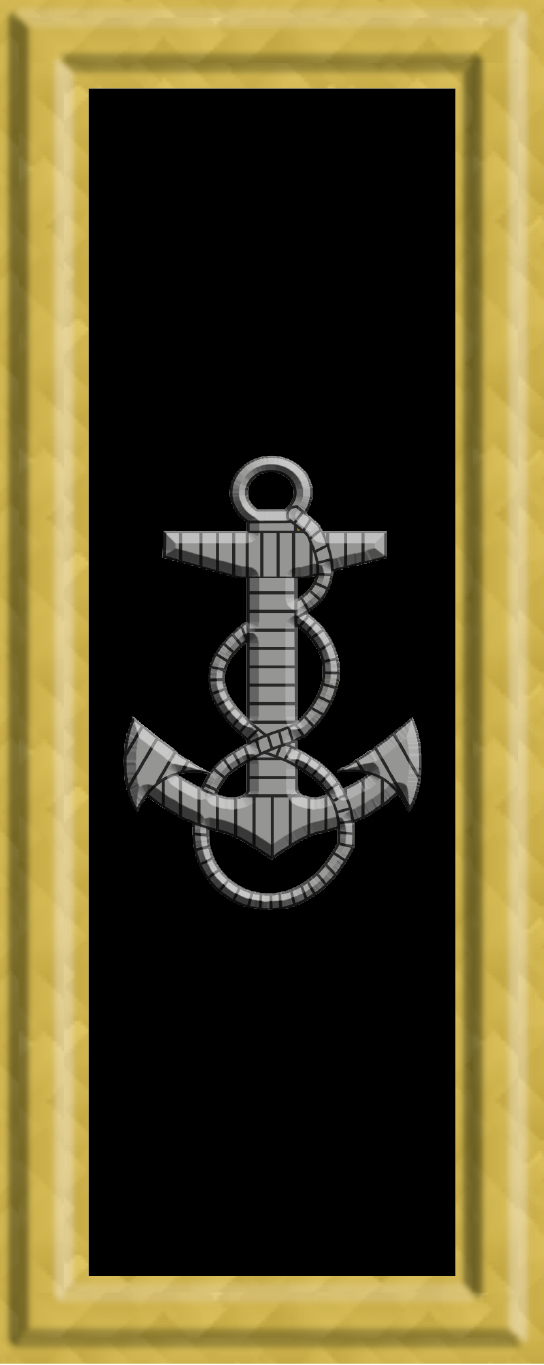
- Rank: Midshipman (USN); Colonel (CSA); Acting Brigadier General (CSA)
- Unit: Orphan Brigade
- Commands: Hodge's Cavalry Brigade
- Conflicts: American Civil War; Battle of Shiloh; Middle Tennessee Raid
- Other work: attorney; politician; orange grower

Member of the Kentucky Senate from the 25th district
- In office August 4, 1873 – August 6, 1877
- Preceded by: Thomas Wrightson
- Succeeded by: Albert S. Berry

Member of the Kentucky House of Representatives from Campbell County
- In office August 1, 1859 – August 5, 1861
- Preceded by: Hugh K. Rachford
- Succeeded by: Cyrus Cambell; George P. Webster

George Baird Hodge (April 8, 1828 – August 1, 1892) was an attorney, Confederate politician, colonel and acting general from the Commonwealth of Kentucky. He commanded a cavalry brigade at various times and was paroled as a brigadier general at the end of the war but his appointment as a brigadier general by Confederate President Jefferson Davis was rejected twice by the Confederate States Senate.

== Early life ==
Hodge was born in Fleming County, Kentucky, to William and Sarah (Baird) Hodge. He received an appointment to the United States Naval Academy at Annapolis, Maryland, and graduated as a midshipman, December 16, 1845. Hodge was later promoted to acting lieutenant, but eventually resigned his commission January 28, 1850. Hodge married Keturah Moss Tibbatts, daughter of Colonel John Wooleston Tibbatts. They had seven children: S. Catherine Taylor (c.1853-1886), Anna Taylor (1854–1923), Jane "Nan"/"Nannie" (1855–1856), Mary (1856–1869), William Baird (1857–1873), Georgena Baird (1859–1927), and John T. (1864–1934).

== Politics ==
Hodge unsuccessfully ran for the United States House of Representatives in 1852. He was later admitted to the bar in Newport, Kentucky, where he practiced law for several years. In 1859, Hodge was elected to the Kentucky House of Representatives as a Democrat. The following year he served as an elector for the Breckinridge ticket.

== Civil War ==
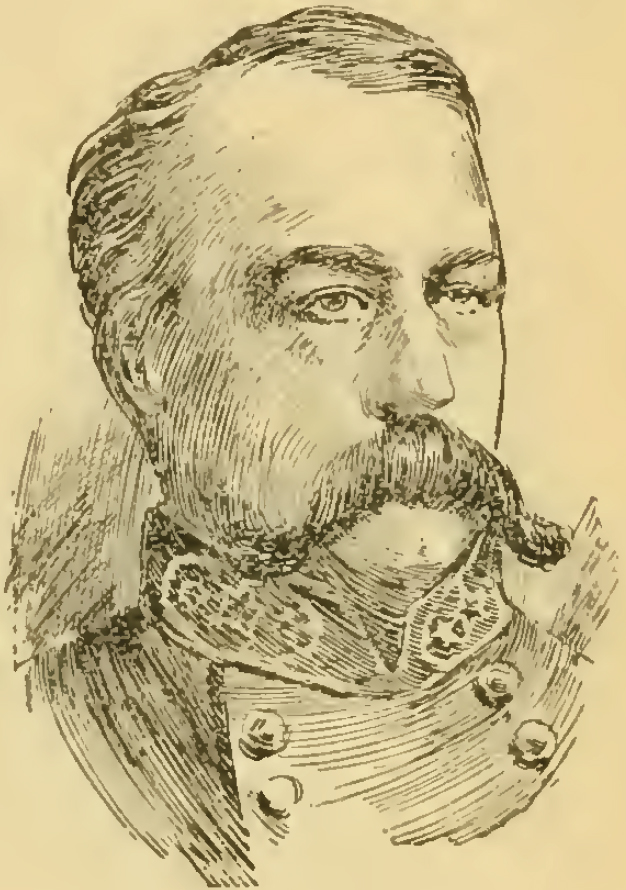
Sketch of Brigadier General Hodge

Hodge enlisted in the Confederate Army as a private in 1861. Soon thereafter, he was chosen to represent Kentucky in the Provisional Confederate Congress from 1861 to 1862. When Hodge was not present in Richmond, Virginia, he was promoted to captain and assistant adjutant general in Breckinridge's First Kentucky Brigade. Hodge received a promotion to major May 6, 1862, for gallantry at the Battle of Shiloh and served as a cavalry brigade commander under Joseph Wheeler and Nathan Bedford Forrest. Wheeler commended Hodge for his service during the Middle Tennessee Raid. Forrest, however, relieved Hodge of his command, charging him with incompetence and cowardice. Hodge was acquitted of the charges and later reinstated to field command. He was promoted to colonel May 6, 1863, and briefly served as inspector-general at Cumberland Gap.

Hodge represented Kentucky in the House of Representatives of the First Confederate Congress from February 18, 1862, to February 17, 1864. After his term expired, he was promoted to colonel and inspector-general and assigned command of the District of Southwest Mississippi and East Louisiana, a post he held until the end of the war. Hodge was promoted acting brigadier general November 20, 1863, but the promotion was rejected by the Confederate Senate. The promotion was resubmitted August 2, 1864, and, again, went unconfirmed. Although he was paroled as a brigadier general and Warner lists him as a Confederate general, Eicher shows him as unconfirmed at that grade and does not list him as a general.

== Later life ==
After the Civil War, Hodge returned to his law practice in Newport. He remained active in politics and served as an elector for the Greeley ticket in 1872. Hodge was elected to the Kentucky Senate and served 1873 to 1877. He also became an orange grower and spent the last years of his life in Florida.

He died August 1, 1892, in Longwood, Florida, and was interred in Seminole, Florida. His remains were moved to Evergreen Cemetery, Southgate, Kentucky, in 1903.

== Publication ==
- Sketch of the First Kentucky Brigade (Frankfort, KY: Printed at the Kentucky Yeoman Office, Major & Johnston), 1874.

== See also ==
- List of American Civil War generals (Acting Confederate)
- Kentucky in the Civil War
