= Thomas L. Jones =

American politician

Thomas Laurens Jones
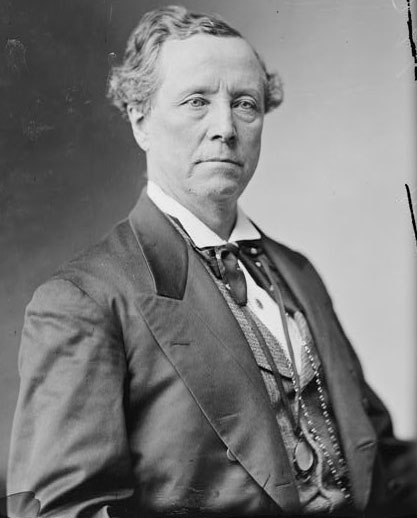

Member of the U.S. House of Representatives from Kentucky's 6th district
- In office March 4, 1867 – March 3, 1871; March 4, 1875 – March 3, 1877
- Preceded by: Andrew H. Ward; William Evans Arthur
- Succeeded by: William Evans Arthur; John G. Carlisle

Member of the Kentucky House of Representatives from Campbell County
- In office August 1, 1853 – August 6, 1855
- Preceded by: Charles J. Helms
- Succeeded by: William Riley

Personal details
- Born: January 22, 1819 White Oak, North Carolina
- Died: June 20, 1887 (aged 68) Newport, Kentucky
- Resting place: Evergreen Cemetery
- Party: Democratic
- Education: Princeton College; Harvard University
- Profession: Lawyer

Thomas Laurens Jones (January 22, 1819 – June 20, 1887) was a U.S. representative from Kentucky.

Born in White Oak, North Carolina, Jones attended private schools. He graduated from Princeton College and from the law department of Harvard University. He was admitted to the bar in Columbia, South Carolina, in 1846 and commenced practice in New York City in 1847. He moved to Newport, Kentucky, in 1849 and continued the practice of law. He served as a member of the State house of representatives from Campbell County 1853–1855.

Jones was elected as a Democrat to the Fortieth and Forty-first Congresses (March 4, 1867 – March 3, 1871). He was not a candidate for renomination in 1870.

Jones was elected to the Forty-fourth Congress (March 4, 1875 – March 3, 1877). He served as chairman of the Committee on Railways and Canals (Forty-fourth Congress). He was not a candidate for renomination. He resumed the practice of law. He died in Newport, Kentucky, June 20, 1887. He was interred in Evergreen Cemetery.

U.S. House of Representatives
Preceded by Andrew H. Ward	Member of the U.S. House of Representatives from Kentucky's 6th congressional district March 4, 1867 – March 3, 1871	Succeeded by William Evans Arthur
Preceded by William Evans Arthur	Member of the U.S. House of Representatives from Kentucky's 6th congressional district March 4, 1875 – March 3, 1877	Succeeded by John G. Carlisle
