= Sherman Tavern =

- U.S. National Register of Historic Places
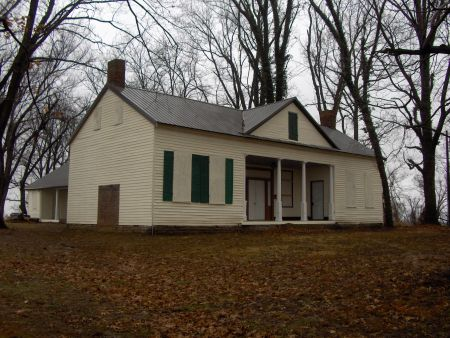

- Location within Kentucky Location within the United States
- Location: South of Sherman, Kentucky on U.S. Route 25
- Coordinates: 38°43′32″N 84°35′54″W
- Area: 7 acres (2.8 ha)
- Built: c.1840
- Architectural style: Greek Revival
- NRHP reference No.: 79000990
- Added to NRHP: February 9, 1979

The Sherman Tavern, near Sherman, Kentucky, was built in about 1840. It was listed on the National Register of Historic Places in 1979.

It was deemed notable as "a good example of the popular version of a three-part Greek Revival composition featuring a recessed pedimented porch. The structure has historical interest in being one of the mid-19th century taverns on the Lexington-Covington Road, one of the first macadamized roads in Kentucky."

The listing included three contributing buildings.

The property is said to have had 10 slave cabins, which no longer exist.

== See also ==
- Gaines Tavern History Center: Walton, Kentucky
- Old Stone Tavern: Frankfort, Kentucky
- Old Talbott Tavern: Bardstown, Kentucky
- National Register of Historic Places listings in Grant County, Kentucky
