= Shaler Battery =

Coordinates: 39°03′55.6″N 84°28′22.5″W

Shaler Battery was a hilltop earthwork fortification built during the American Civil War in Northern Kentucky by the Union Army to turn back invading Confederate troops. It was constructed to protect Cincinnati and the Ohio River valley. The location of this battery's powder magazine is marked by a bandstand in Evergreen Cemetery in Southgate, Kentucky.

Shaler Battery was one of the 28 artillery batteries that were built on northern Kentucky hilltops from 1861 to 1863 for the Defense of Cincinnati. It was originally a small earthwork fortification on the point of a hill, ringed by rifle pit entrenchments. This smaller battery was removed following the construction of a larger earthwork approximately 50 feet behind (north). This portion of the earthwork remains, as well as part of the earthen ramp and small drainage ditches. The surrounding area is covered with graves and the rifle pits were filled in to form a road which is now paved.

The battery was named for Dr. Nathaniel Burger Shaler, a prominent Newport, Kentucky physician, who offered his family's hilltop vineyard (which was adjacent to the cemetery and would eventually be purchased from the family estate as an addition to Evergreen) as a site for the battery.
