= Arthur B. Rouse =

American politician (1874–1956)

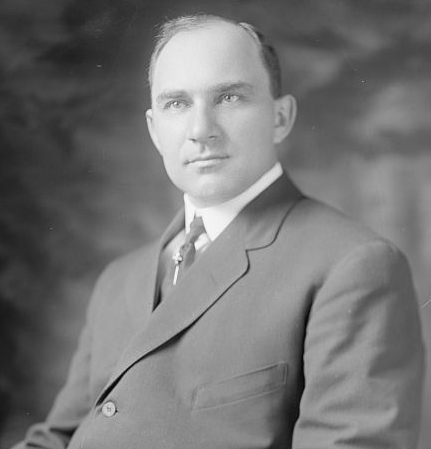
- Rouse, 1905–1945

Member of the U.S. House of Representatives from Kentucky's 6th district
- In office March 4, 1911 – March 3, 1927
- Preceded by: Joseph L. Rhinock
- Succeeded by: Orie Solomon Ware

Personal details
- Born: Arthur Blyth Rouse; June 20, 1874 Burlington, Kentucky
- Died: January 25, 1956 (aged 81) Lexington, Kentucky
- Resting place: Lexington Cemetery
- Party: Democratic
- Education: Hanover College; University of Louisville School of Law
- Profession: Lawyer

Arthur Blyth Rouse (June 20, 1874 – January 25, 1956) was a U.S. representative from Kentucky.

== Early life ==
Born in Burlington, Kentucky, Rouse attended the public schools, graduating from Boone County High School. He was graduated from Hanover College, Indiana, in 1896 and from the Louisville Law School in 1900. He was admitted to the bar in 1900 and commenced practice in Burlington.

== Political career ==
In 1907, Rouse became the first secretary of the Kentucky State Racing Commission and served four years in that capacity. He then served as State revenue commissioner under Gov. Ruby Laffoon. He was secretary to Representatives Daniel Linn Gooch and Joseph L. Rhinock. He served as member of the Democratic State executive committee from 1903 to 1910.

Rouse was elected as a Democrat to the Sixty-second and to the seven succeeding Congresses (March 4, 1911 – March 3, 1927). He was not a candidate for renomination in 1926. He served as chairman of the Democratic National Congressional Committee from 1921 until he resigned in December 1924. He resumed the practice of law in Erlanger, Kentucky, and operated several bus companies, including Dixie Traction.

He was appointed clerk of the United States District Court for the Eastern District of Kentucky on October 8, 1935, and served until his resignation due to ill health in January 1953. He died in Lexington, Kentucky, January 25, 1956, and was interred at Lexington Cemetery.

U.S. House of Representatives
Preceded by Joseph L. Rhinock	Member of the U.S. House of Representatives from Kentucky's 6th congressional district March 4, 1911 – March 3, 1927	Succeeded by Orie S. Ware
