= William H. Horsfall =

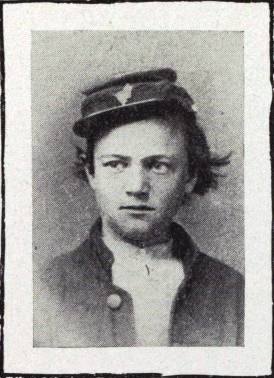
- Born: March 3, 1847; Newport, Kentucky, US
- Died: October 22, 1922 (aged 75); Newport, Kentucky, US
- Burial place: Evergreen Cemetery Southgate, Kentucky
- Military career
- Allegiance: United States; Union
- Branch: United States Army; Union Army
- Rank: Drummer
- Unit: 1st Kentucky Infantry
- Conflicts: American Civil War: Siege of Corinth
- Awards: Medal of Honor

William H. Horsfall (March 3, 1847 – October 22, 1922) was one of the youngest men to receive the Medal of Honor during the American Civil War. He was born in 1847, in Newport, Kentucky. He enlisted as a drummer in Company G, 1st Kentucky Volunteer Infantry, on December 31, 1861, at age 14. Horsfall performed his act of heroism as a 15-year-old drummer in Co. G, 1st Kentucky Infantry. The medal was awarded for saving the life of a wounded officer during the Siege of Corinth on May 21, 1862.

Horsfall was later commander of William Nelson Post GAR of Newport. He died on October 22, 1922, in Newport and is buried in Evergreen Cemetery in Southgate, Kentucky.

== Medal of Honor citation ==
Rank and organization. Drummer, Company G, 1st Kentucky Infantry. Place and date: At Corinth, Miss., May 21, 1862. Entered service at : ------. Birth: Campbell County, Ky. Date of issue: August 17, 1895.

Citation

Saved the life of a wounded officer lying between the lines.

== See also ==
- List of Medal of Honor recipients
- List of American Civil War Medal of Honor recipients: G–L
