= William W. Dickerson =

American politician (1851–1923)

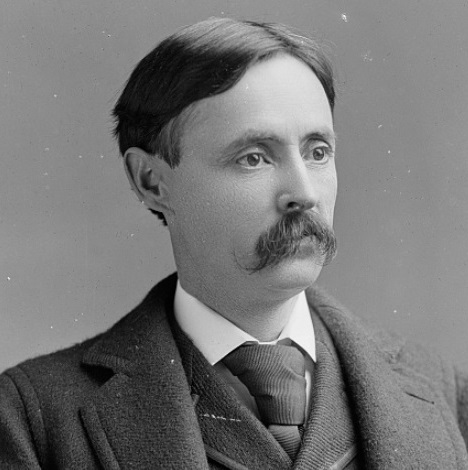
- C. M. Bell (Washington, D.C.), photographer. Library of Congress

Member of the U.S. House of Representatives from Kentucky's 6th district
- In office June 21, 1890 – March 3, 1893
- Preceded by: John G. Carlisle
- Succeeded by: Albert S. Berry

Member of the Kentucky Senate from the 26th district
- In office August 1, 1887 – June 21, 1890
- Preceded by: J. T. Simon
- Succeeded by: Ed. Daum

Member of the Kentucky House of Representatives from Grant County
- In office August 3, 1885 – August 1, 1887
- Preceded by: C. C. Cram
- Succeeded by: Timothy Needham

Personal details
- Born: William Worth Dickerson; November 29, 1851 Sherman, Kentucky, U.S.
- Died: January 31, 1923 (aged 71)
- Resting place: City Cemetery, Williamstown, Kentucky, U.S.
- Party: Democratic
- Profession: Politician, lawyer

William Worth Dickerson (November 29, 1851 – January 31, 1923) was a U.S. representative from Kentucky.

Born in Sherman, Kentucky, Dickerson attended the public schools and the private academy of New Mexico Lloyd in Crittenden, Kentucky. He studied law. He was admitted to the bar in 1872 and commenced practice in Williamstown, Kentucky. He served as prosecuting attorney of Grant County 1872–1876. He served as a member of the Kentucky House of Representatives from 1885 to 1887, representing Grant County. He served as a member of the Kentucky Senate from 1887 to 1890, representing the 26th district, which comprised Bracken, Grant, and Pendleton Counties.

Dickerson was elected as a Democrat to the Fifty-first Congress to fill the vacancy caused by the resignation of John G. Carlisle. He was reelected to the Fifty-second Congress and served from June 21, 1890, to March 3, 1893. He was an unsuccessful candidate for renomination in 1892. He resumed the practice of law in Williamstown, Kentucky. He moved to Cincinnati, Ohio, in 1902 and continued the practice of his profession until his death January 31, 1923. His remains were cremated and the ashes interred in the City Cemetery, Williamstown, Kentucky.

U.S. House of Representatives
Preceded by John G. Carlisle	Member of the U.S. House of Representatives from Kentucky's 6th congressional district June 21, 1890 – March 3, 1893	Succeeded by Albert S. Berry
