= Downingsville, Kentucky =

Unincorporated community in Kentucky, United States

Coordinates: 38°38′30″N 84°42′48″W

Downingsville is an unincorporated community in Grant County, Kentucky, in the United States.

== History ==
A post office called Downingsville was established in 1844, and remained in operation until it was discontinued in 1909. In the 1870s, business enterprises in Downingsville included a hotel, a gristmill and a sawmill.
