= Old Stone Tavern (Frankfort, Kentucky) =

- U.S. National Register of Historic Places
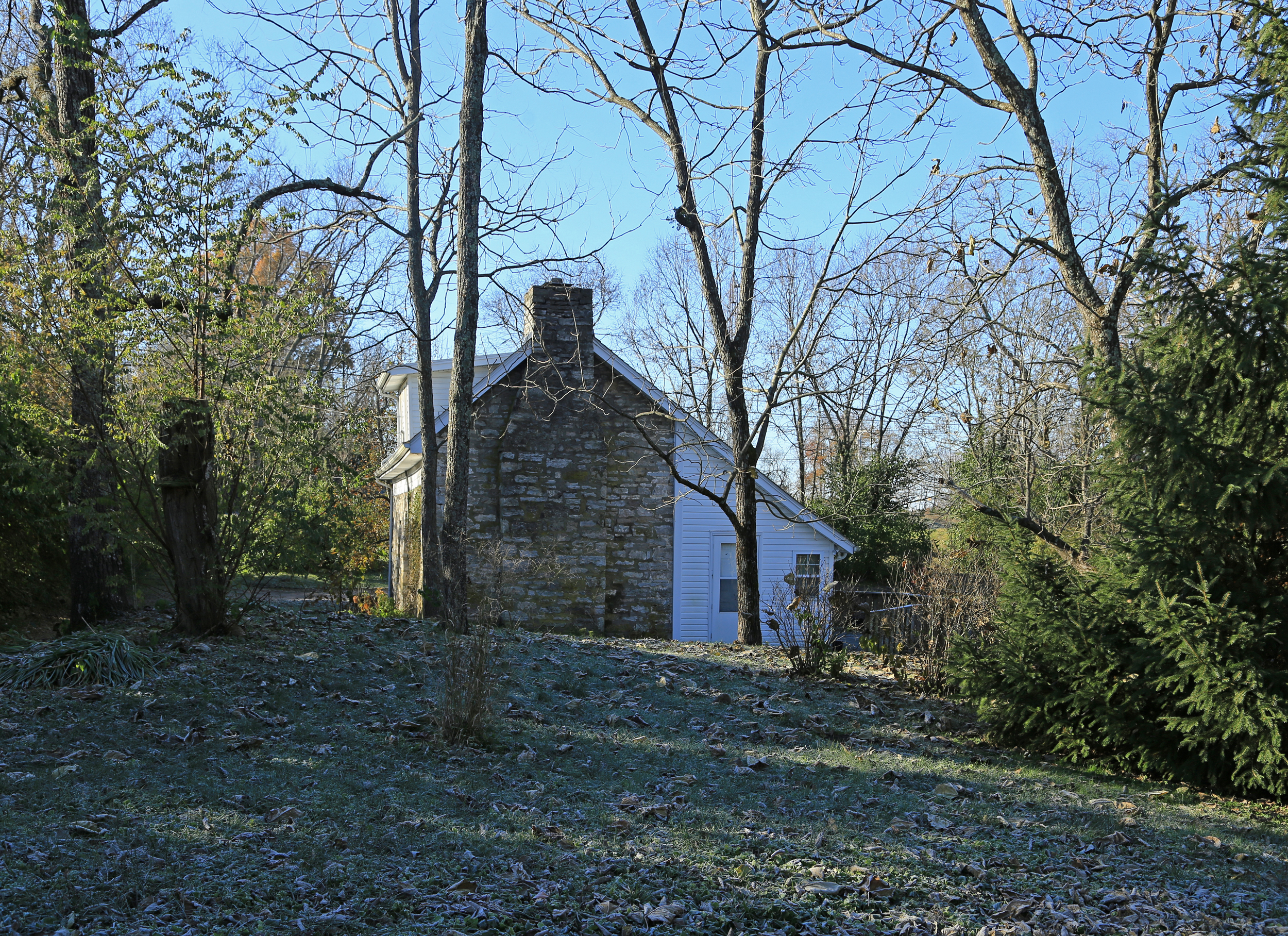

- Location within Kentucky Location within the United States
- Nearest city: Frankfort, Kentucky
- Coordinates: 38°11′16″N 84°48′2″W
- MPS: Early Stone Buildings of Central Kentucky TR
- NRHP reference No.: 83002774
- Added to NRHP: June 23, 1983

The Old Stone Tavern, near Frankfort, Kentucky, is a historic stone building that once served as an inn and tavern on a stagecoach line, and later served as a toll house. It was listed on the National Register of Historic Places in 1983.

It is a one-and-three-quarters-story hall-parlor plan structure that is the primary structure remaining out of an old inn complex.

It is located on the Old Leestown Pike the corner of Scruggs Lane.

A former blacksmith site is behind the house.

== See also ==
- Gaines Tavern History Center: Walton, Kentucky
- Old Talbott Tavern: Bardstown, Kentucky
- Sherman Tavern: Sherman, Kentucky
- National Register of Historic Places listings in Franklin County, Kentucky
