= Abner Gaines House =

Historic house in Kentucky, United States

- Colonel Abner Gaines House
- U.S. National Register of Historic Places
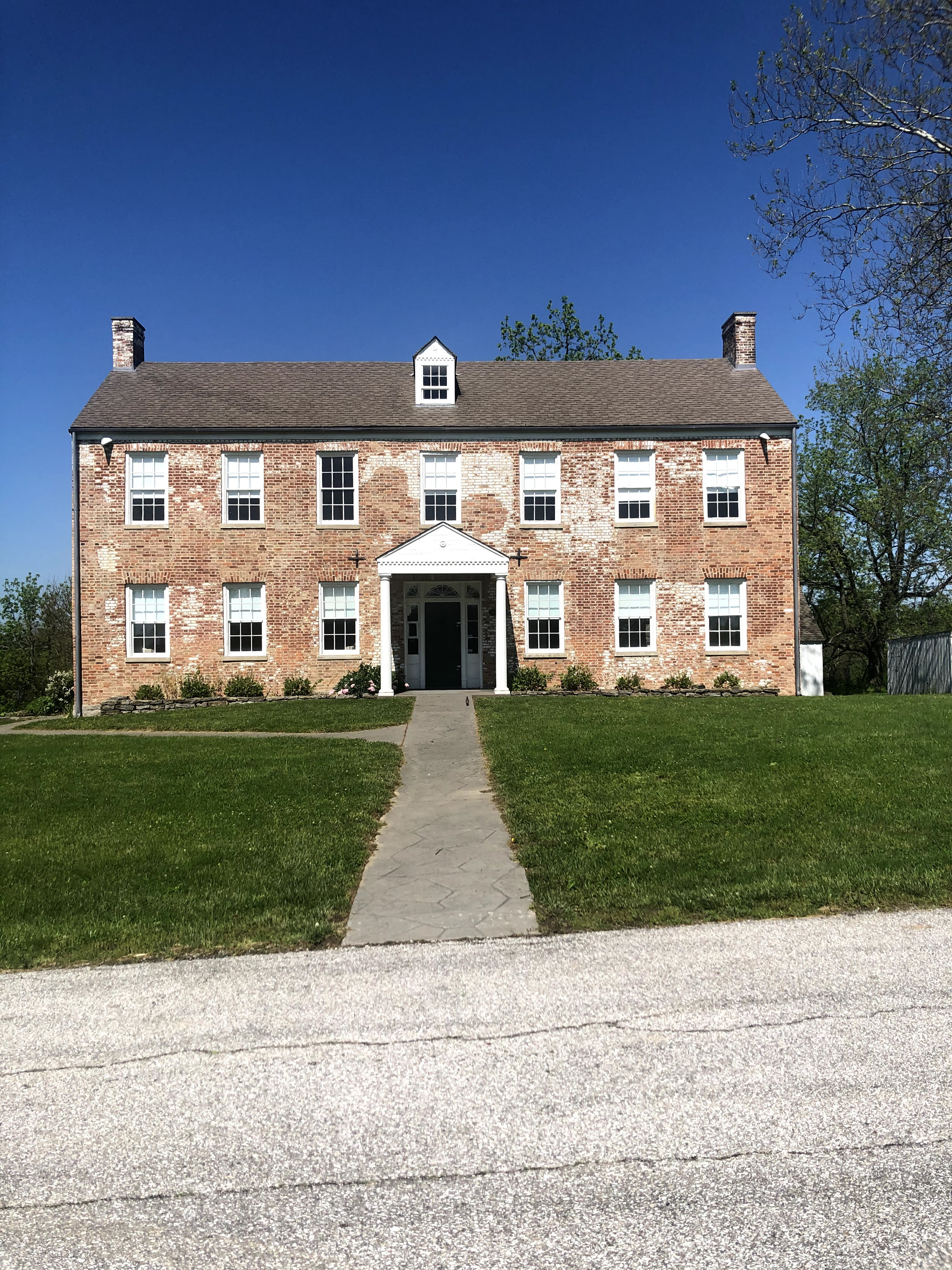

- Location within Kentucky Location within the United States
- Nearest city: Walton, Kentucky
- Coordinates: 38°53′2.77″N 84°36′29.76″W
- Built: 1814
- Architectural style: Federal
- NRHP reference No.: 80001483
- Added to NRHP: April 10, 1980

The Abner Gaines House or Gaines Tavern History Center was built on the Old Lexington Pike in Walton, Kentucky in 1814. It is the oldest house in Walton and is built in the Federal Style, featuring three stairways and ten carved mantels.

The home's location was home to a tavern as early as 1795. Abner Gaines came to Kentucky from Virginia in 1804, became a Boone County Justice the following year, and purchased this tavern in 1813 before replacing it with the new house the following year. Gaines opened a Post Office in his tavern in 1815; Walton at that time being known as the "Gaines crossroads". Gaines then began the first stagecoach line between Cincinnati, Ohio and Lexington, Kentucky. In 1817 he was appointed Sheriff. Gaines and his wife Elizabeth née Matthews had 13 children.

Local historians speculate that slaves owned by Gaines worked as skilled craftsmen to build the 17-room, 2 1/2-story main house.

The house remained in the Gaines family for four generations and was sold after the Civil War. In 1897, a newspaper article discusses whether to raze the property, but it was repaired by subsequent owners and used as an antiques shop from 1930s until 1997. The Abner Gaines house was added to the National Register of Historic Places in 1980. The home and 7.6 acres (3.1 ha) were purchased by the City of Walton in December 2006 for $325,000.00. After restoration it reopened as the Gaines Tavern History Center. In 2022, the building was featured on an episode of Ghost Hunters.

== See also ==
- Old Stone Tavern: Frankfort, Kentucky
- Old Talbott Tavern: Bardstown, Kentucky
- Sherman Tavern: Sherman, Kentucky
- National Register of Historic Places listings in Boone County, Kentucky
- John P. Gaines
- Richard M. Gaines
- Gaines' Landing, Arkansas
