= J. Lincoln Newhall =

American politician

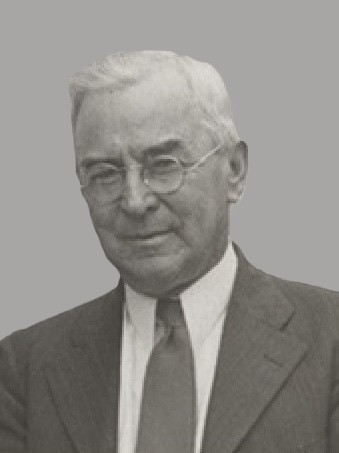

Member of the U.S. House of Representatives from Kentucky's 6th district
- In office March 4, 1929 – March 3, 1931
- Preceded by: Orie S. Ware
- Succeeded by: Brent Spence

Personal details
- Born: Judson Lincoln Newhall; March 26, 1870 Hunterstown, Quebec, Canada
- Died: July 23, 1952 (aged 82) Covington, Kentucky, US
- Resting place: Forest Lawn Cemetery, Erlanger, Kentucky, US
- Party: Republican
- Occupation: Businessman, school music director, storekeeper-gauger

Judson Lincoln Newhall (March 26, 1870 – July 23, 1952) was a U.S. representative from Kentucky, businessman and school musical director. Born in Hunterstown, Quebec, Canada, Newhall moved to Covington, Kentucky, with his parents in 1874. There, he attended public school and graduated from Martin's Academy in 1886.

== Career ==
Newhall attended the law department of Indiana University Bloomington between 1896 and 1898, along with special academic courses at the University of Cincinnati from 1924 to 1926. He was employed in the US Internal Revenue Service as a storekeeper-gauger from 1899 until he resigned in 1905, to engage in musical work. Newhall served as director of music in the Covington public schools from 1913 to 1917. This was interrupted by the First World War, while he served as a secretary in the YMCA welfare service. After the war, he resumed his position with the Covington schools.

Newhall was elected as a Republican to the 71st Congress (serving between March 4, 1929, and March 3, 1931). He was an unsuccessful candidate for reelection in 1930 to the Seventy-second Congress and for election in 1934 to the 74th Congress. Instead, he worked in the oil and gasoline business.

Newhall died in Park Hills, Covington, on July 23, 1952, and was interred in Forest Lawn Cemetery, Erlanger, Kentucky. At the time of his death, he was aged 82.

U.S. House of Representatives
Preceded by Orie S. Ware	Member of the U.S. House of Representatives from Kentucky's 6th congressional district March 4, 1929 – March 3, 1931	Succeeded by Brent Spence
