= Daniel Linn Gooch =

American politician and businessman

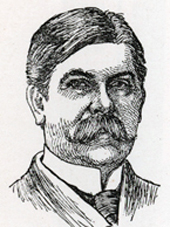

Member of the U.S. House of Representatives from Kentucky's 6th district
- In office March 4, 1901 – March 3, 1905
- Preceded by: Albert S. Berry
- Succeeded by: Joseph L. Rhinock

Personal details
- Born: October 28, 1853 Rumsey, Kentucky
- Died: April 12, 1913 (aged 59) Covington, Kentucky
- Resting place: Dayton, Ohio
- Party: Democratic
- Occupation: Pharmaceutical executive

Daniel Linn Gooch (October 28, 1853 – April 12, 1913) was a U.S. representative from Kentucky and businessman.

Born in Rumsey, McLean County, Kentucky, Gooch attended a private school. After entering the pharmaceutical industry at the age of seventeen, he subsequently became president of a large wholesale drug and chemical company.

Gooch was elected as a Democrat to the 57th and 58th Congresses, between March 4, 1901, and March 3, 1905.

According to the November 1903 Congressional Dictionary, Gooch "takes great interest in patriotic societies, one of his ancestors being a major-general and another a colonial governor; is deputy governor-general of the Society of Sons of Colonial Wars, and governor of the Order of Descendants of Colonial Governors". He was an unsuccessful candidate for renomination in 1904, henceforth retiring from public life.

Gooch died in Covington, Kentucky, on April 12, 1913. He was interred in Woodlawn Cemetery, Dayton, Ohio.

U.S. House of Representatives
Preceded by Albert S. Berry	Member of the U.S. House of Representatives from Kentucky's 6th congressional district March 4, 1901 – March 3, 1905	Succeeded by Joseph L. Rhinock
