= William Evans Arthur =

American politician

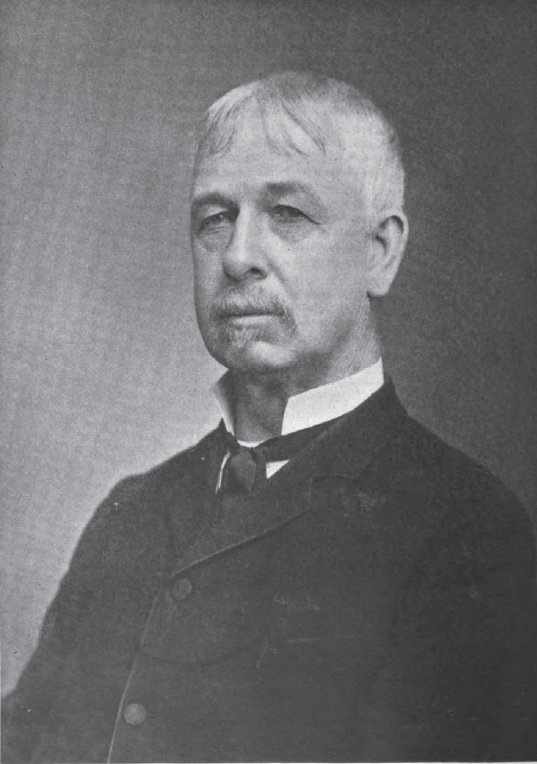

Member of the U.S. House of Representatives from Kentucky's 6th district
- In office March 4, 1871 – March 3, 1875
- Preceded by: Thomas Laurens Jones
- Succeeded by: Thomas Laurens Jones

Personal details
- Born: March 3, 1825 Cincinnati, Ohio, US
- Died: May 18, 1897 (aged 72) Covington, Kentucky, US
- Resting place: Linden Grove Cemetery
- Party: Democratic
- Spouse(s): Addie Southgate; Etha Southgate
- Relations: Son-in-law of William Wright Southgate
- Profession: Lawyer

William Evans Arthur (March 3, 1825 – May 18, 1897) was a U.S. representative from Kentucky.

== Early life and family ==
William E. Arthur was born in Cincinnati, Ohio on March 3, 1825. He was the son of William and Eliza (Parsons) Arthur. In 1832, the family moved to Covington, Kentucky. Two years later, Arthur's father died.

Arthur received his early education in private schools and from private tutors in Covington and Harford County, Maryland. He then studied law under John W. Stevenson and James Turner Morehead. He was admitted to the bar in 1850 and commenced practice in Covington.

In 1855, Arthur married Addie Southgate, daughter of former Congressman William Wright Southgate. His first wife died in 1858, and in December 1860, Arthur married her younger sister Etha Southgate. The couple had two children – a son named Sidney and a daughter named May.

== Political career ==
In 1856, Arthur was elected Commonwealth's Attorney for the ninth judicial district for a term of six years. He served as presidential elector on the Democratic ticket of John C. Breckinridge and Joseph Lane in the 1860 presidential election.

In 1866, Arthur was elected criminal judge of the ninth circuit served until 1868, when he resigned. He was elected to represent the Sixth District in the U.S. House of Representatives in 1870. During the Forty-second and Forty-third Congresses (March 4, 1871 – March 3, 1875), he served on the House Committees on Elections and Railways and Canals. He was not a candidate for renomination in 1874.

== Later life and death ==
After the expiration of his congressional term, he resumed the practice of law in Covington. In August 1886, he was elected judge of the twelfth judicial circuit of Kentucky and served until the expiration of his term on January 1, 1893. He resumed his law practice until his death in Covington on May 18, 1897. He was interred in Linden Grove Cemetery.

U.S. House of Representatives
Preceded by Thomas L. Jones	Member of the U.S. House of Representatives from Kentucky's 6th congressional district March 4, 1871 – March 3, 1875	Succeeded by Thomas L. Jones
