= Jonesville, Grant County, Kentucky =

Unincorporated community in Kentucky, United States

Jonesville, Kentucky
- Unincorporated community
- Location within Kentucky Location within the United States
- Coordinates: 38°38′23″N 84°46′32″W
- Country: United States
- State: Kentucky
- County: Grant
- Elevation: 915 ft (279 m)
- Time zone: UTC-5 (Eastern (EST))
  - Summer (DST): UTC-4 (EDT)
- ZIP code: 41052
- Area code: 859
- GNIS feature ID: 495518

Jonesville is an unincorporated community in Grant County, Kentucky, United States. The community is located along Kentucky Route 36 11.6 miles (18.7 km) west of Williamstown. Jonesville has a post office with ZIP code 41052.
