= Thomas M. Doherty =

- Born: May 11, 1869; Mitchelstown,County Cork,Ireland
- Died: September 21, 1906 (aged 37); Fort Thomas, Kentucky, US
- Burial place: Evergreen Cemetery Southgate, Kentucky
- Military career
- Allegiance: United States of America
- Branch: United States Army
- Service years: 1891–1906
- Rank: Drum Major
- Units: Company H, 21st U.S. Infantry
- Conflicts: Spanish–American War
- Awards: Medal of Honor

Thomas M. Doherty (May 11, 1869 – September 21, 1906) was a corporal serving in the United States Army during the Spanish–American War who received the Medal of Honor for bravery.

== Biography ==
Doherty was born on May 11, 1869, in County Cork, Ireland. After immigrating to the United States, he joined the army from Boston, Massachusetts in September 1891. He was sent to fight in the Spanish–American War with Company H, 21st U.S. Infantry as a corporal where he received the Medal of Honor for his actions. Doherty continued to serve in the army, being promoted to Drum Major, before he committed suicide on September 21, 1906, at Fort Thomas, Kentucky. He is buried in Evergreen Cemetery Southgate, Kentucky.

== Medal of Honor citation ==
- Rank and organization: Corporal, Company H, 21st U.S. Infantry.
- Place and date: At Santiago, Cuba, 1 July 1898.
- Entered service at: Newcastle, Maine.
- Birth: Ireland. Date of issue: 22 June 1899.

Citation:

Gallantly assisted in the rescue of the wounded from in front of the lines and while under heavy fire from the enemy.

== See also ==
- List of Medal of Honor recipients for the Spanish–American War
