= Kentucky's 6th congressional district =

U.S. House district for Kentucky

Coordinates: 38°03′12″N 84°09′17″W

- Interactive map of district boundaries since January 3, 2023
- Representative: Andy Barr; R–Lexington
- Distribution: 72.6% urban; 27.4% rural
- Population (2025): 781,320
- Median household income: $71,098
- Ethnicity: 78.5% White; 8.4% Black; 6.2% Hispanic; 4.2% Two or more races; 2.2% Asian; 0.6% other
- Cook PVI: R+7

Kentucky's 6th congressional district is a congressional district in the U.S. state of Kentucky. Based in Central Kentucky, the district contains the cities of Lexington (including its suburbs), Richmond, and Georgetown. The district is currently represented by Republican Andy Barr.

== Voter registration ==
On October 9, 2026, the district had 559,580 registered voters, who were registered with the following parties.

Party	Registration	
Party	Voters	%
Republican	245,436	43.86
Democratic	244,100	43.86
Independent	35,701	6.38
Libertarian	2,881	0.51
Green	531	0.09
Constitution	269	0.05
Socialist Workers	153	0.03
Kentucky	93	0.02
Reform	50	0.01
"Other"	30,366	5.43
Total	559,580	100.00

== Recent election results from statewide races ==
Year	Office	Results
2008	President	McCain 55% - 43%
2012	President	Romney 59% - 41%
2016	President	Trump 56% - 38%
2016	Senate	Gray 51% - 49%
2019	Governor	Beshear 54% - 44%
2019	Attorney General	Cameron 53% - 47%
2020	President	Trump 54% - 44%
2020	Senate	McConnell 52% - 44%
2022	Senate	Paul 54% - 46%
2023	Governor	Beshear 60% - 40%
2023	Attorney General	Coleman 52% - 48%
2023	Auditor of Public Accounts	Ball 57% - 43%
2023	Secretary of State	Adams 57% - 43%
2023	Treasurer	Metcalf 52% - 48%
2024	President	Trump 57% - 42%

== Composition ==
For the 118th and successive Congresses (based on redistricting following the 2020 census), the district contains all or portions of the following counties and communities:

Anderson County (1)

Lawrenceburg

Bath County (0)

No municipalities or census-recognized places

Bourbon County (3)

All 3 communities

Clark County (1)

Winchester

Estill County (2)

Irvine, Ravenna

Fayette County (1)

Lexington

Fleming County (3)

All 3 communities

Garrard County (1)

Lancaster

Jessamine County (3)

All 3 communities

Madison County (2)

Berea, Richmond

Mercer County (3)

All 3 communities

Montgomery County (3)

All 3 communities

Nicholas County (1)

Carlisle

Powell County (2)

Clay City, Stanton

Scott County (3)

All 3 communities

Woodford County (2)

Midway, Versailles

== List of members representing the district ==
Member	Party	Years	Cong ress	Electoral history	Location
District created March 4, 1803
George M. Bedinger (Blue Licks Springs)	Democratic-Republican	March 4, 1803 – March 3, 1807	8th 9th	Elected in 1803. Re-elected in 1804. Retired.	1803–1813; Bourbon, Fleming, Floyd, Mason, and Nicholas counties
Joseph Desha (Mays Lick)	Democratic-Republican	March 4, 1807 – March 3, 1813	10th 11th 12th	Elected in 1806. Re-elected in 1808. Re-elected in 1810. Redistricted to the 4th district.	1803–1813; Bourbon, Fleming, Floyd, Mason, and Nicholas counties
Solomon P. Sharp (Bowling Green)	Democratic-Republican	March 4, 1813 – March 3, 1817	13th 14th	Elected in 1812. Re-elected in 1814. Lost re-election.	1813–1823; Barren, Butler, Cumberland, Logan, and Warren counties
David Walker (Russellville)	Democratic-Republican	March 4, 1817 – March 1, 1820	15th 16th	Elected in 1816. Re-elected in 1818. Died.	1813–1823; Barren, Butler, Cumberland, Logan, and Warren counties
Vacant		March 1, 1820 – November 13, 1820	16th		1813–1823; Barren, Butler, Cumberland, Logan, and Warren counties
Francis Johnson (Bowling Green)	Democratic-Republican	November 13, 1820 – March 3, 1823	16th 17th	Elected to finish Walker's term. Also elected in 1820 to the next term. Redistricted to the 10th district.	1813–1823; Barren, Butler, Cumberland, Logan, and Warren counties
David White (New Castle)	Democratic-Republican	March 4, 1823 – March 3, 1825	18th	Elected in 1822. Retired.	1823–1833; Franklin, Gallatin, Henry, Owen, and Shelby counties
Joseph Lecompte (New Castle)	Jacksonian	March 4, 1825 – March 3, 1833	19th 20th 21st 22nd	Elected in 1824. Re-elected in 1827. Re-elected in 1829. Re-elected in 1831. Retired.	1823–1833; Franklin, Gallatin, Henry, Owen, and Shelby counties
Thomas Chilton (Elizabethtown)	Anti-Jacksonian	March 4, 1833 – March 3, 1835	23rd	Elected in 1833. Retired.	1833–1843 [data missing]
John Calhoon (Hardinsburg)	Anti-Jacksonian	March 4, 1835 – March 3, 1837	24th 25th	Elected in 1835. Re-elected in 1837. Retired.	1833–1843 [data missing]
John Calhoon (Hardinsburg)	Whig	March 4, 1837 – March 3, 1839	24th 25th	Elected in 1835. Re-elected in 1837. Retired.	1833–1843 [data missing]
Willis Green (Green)	Whig	March 4, 1839 – March 3, 1843	26th 27th	Elected in 1839. Re-elected in 1841. Redistricted to the 2nd district.	1833–1843 [data missing]
John White (Richmond)	Whig	March 4, 1843 – March 3, 1845	28th	Redistricted from the 9th district and re-elected in 1843. Retired.	1843–1853 [data missing]
John P. Martin (Prestonburg)	Democratic	March 4, 1845 – March 3, 1847	29th	Elected in 1845. Retired.	1843–1853 [data missing]
Green Adams (Barbourville)	Whig	March 4, 1847 – March 3, 1849	30th	Elected in 1847. Retired.	1843–1853 [data missing]
Daniel Breck (Richmond)	Whig	March 4, 1849 – March 3, 1851	31st	Elected in 1849. Retired.	1843–1853 [data missing]
Addison White (Richmond)	Whig	March 4, 1851 – March 3, 1853	32nd	Elected in 1851. Retired.	1843–1853 [data missing]
John M. Elliott (Prestonburg)	Democratic	March 4, 1853 – March 3, 1859	33rd 34th 35th	Elected in 1853. Re-elected in 1855. Re-elected in 1857. Retired.	1853–1863 [data missing]
Green Adams (Barbourville)	Opposition	March 4, 1859 – March 3, 1861	36th	Elected in 1859. Retired.	1853–1863 [data missing]
George W. Dunlap (Lancaster)	Union Democratic	March 4, 1861 – March 3, 1863	37th	Elected in 1861. Retired.	1853–1863 [data missing]
Green C. Smith (Covington)	Union Democratic	March 4, 1863 – July 13, 1866	38th	Elected in 1863.	1863–1873 [data missing]
Green C. Smith (Covington)	Unconditional Union	March 4, 1863 – July 13, 1866	39th	Re-elected in 1865. Resigned to become Governor of Montana Territory.	1863–1873 [data missing]
Vacant		July 13, 1866 – December 3, 1866	39th		1863–1873 [data missing]
Andrew H. Ward (Cynthiana)	Democratic	December 3, 1866 – March 3, 1867	39th	Elected to finish Smith's term. Retired.	1863–1873 [data missing]
Thomas L. Jones (Newport)	Democratic	March 4, 1867 – March 3, 1871	40th 41st	Elected in 1867. Re-elected in 1868. Retired.	1863–1873 [data missing]
William E. Arthur (Covington)	Democratic	March 4, 1871 – March 3, 1875	42nd 43rd	Elected in 1870. Re-elected in 1872. Retired.	1863–1873 [data missing]
William E. Arthur (Covington)	Democratic	March 4, 1871 – March 3, 1875	42nd 43rd	Elected in 1870. Re-elected in 1872. Retired.	1873–1883 [data missing]
Thomas L. Jones (Newport)	Democratic	March 4, 1875 – March 3, 1877	44th	Elected in 1874. Retired.	1873–1883 [data missing]
John G. Carlisle (Covington)	Democratic	March 4, 1877 – May 26, 1890	45th 46th 47th 48th 49th 50th 51st	Elected in 1876. Re-elected in 1878. Re-elected in 1880. Re-elected in 1882. Re-elected in 1884. Re-elected in 1886. Re-elected in 1888. Resigned when elected U.S. senator.	1873–1883 [data missing]
John G. Carlisle (Covington)	Democratic	March 4, 1877 – May 26, 1890	45th 46th 47th 48th 49th 50th 51st	Elected in 1876. Re-elected in 1878. Re-elected in 1880. Re-elected in 1882. Re-elected in 1884. Re-elected in 1886. Re-elected in 1888. Resigned when elected U.S. senator.	1883–1893 [data missing]
Vacant		May 26, 1890 – June 21, 1890	51st		1883–1893 [data missing]
William W. Dickerson (Williamstown)	Democratic	June 21, 1890 – March 3, 1893	51st 52nd	Elected to finish Carlisle's term. Re-elected in 1890. Lost renomination.	1883–1893 [data missing]
Albert S. Berry (Newport)	Democratic	March 4, 1893 – March 3, 1901	53rd 54th 55th 56th	Elected in 1892. Re-elected in 1894. Re-elected in 1896. Re-elected in 1898. Lost renomination.	1893–1903 [data missing]
Daniel Linn Gooch (Covington)	Democratic	March 4, 1901 – March 3, 1905	57th 58th	Elected in 1900. Re-elected in 1902. Lost renomination.	1893–1903 [data missing]
Daniel Linn Gooch (Covington)	Democratic	March 4, 1901 – March 3, 1905	57th 58th	Elected in 1900. Re-elected in 1902. Lost renomination.	1903–1913 [data missing]
Joseph L. Rhinock (Covington)	Democratic	March 4, 1905 – March 3, 1911	59th 60th 61st	Elected in 1904. Re-elected in 1906. Re-elected in 1908. Retired.	1903–1913 [data missing]
Arthur B. Rouse (Burlington)	Democratic	March 4, 1911 – March 3, 1927	62nd 63rd 64th 65th 66th 67th 68th 69th	Elected in 1910. Re-elected in 1912. Re-elected in 1914. Re-elected in 1916. Re-elected in 1918. Re-elected in 1920. Re-elected in 1922. Re-elected in 1924. Retired.	1903–1913 [data missing]
Arthur B. Rouse (Burlington)	Democratic	March 4, 1911 – March 3, 1927	62nd 63rd 64th 65th 66th 67th 68th 69th	Elected in 1910. Re-elected in 1912. Re-elected in 1914. Re-elected in 1916. Re-elected in 1918. Re-elected in 1920. Re-elected in 1922. Re-elected in 1924. Retired.	1913–1933
Orie S. Ware (Covington)	Democratic	March 4, 1927 – March 3, 1929	70th	Elected in 1926. Retired.	1913–1933
J. Lincoln Newhall (Covington)	Republican	March 4, 1929 – March 3, 1931	71st	Elected in 1928. Lost re-election.	1913–1933
Brent Spence (Fort Thomas)	Democratic	March 4, 1931 – March 3, 1933	72nd	Elected in 1930. Redistricted to the at-large district.	1913–1933
District inactive		March 4, 1933 – January 3, 1935	73rd		
Virgil Chapman (Paris)	Democratic	January 3, 1935 – January 3, 1949	74th 75th 76th 77th 78th 79th 80th	Redistricted from the at-large district and re-elected in 1934. Re-elected in 1936. Re-elected in 1938. Re-elected in 1940. Re-elected in 1942. Re-elected in 1944. Re-elected in 1946. Retired to run for U.S. senator.	1935–1953
Thomas R. Underwood (Lexington)	Democratic	January 3, 1949 – March 17, 1951	81st 82nd	Elected in 1948. Re-elected in 1950. Resigned when appointed U.S. senator.	1935–1953
Vacant		March 17, 1951 – April 4, 1951	82nd		1935–1953
John C. Watts (Nicholasville)	Democratic	April 4, 1951 – September 24, 1971	82nd 83rd 84th 85th 86th 87th 88th 89th 90th 91st 92nd	Elected to finish Underwood's term. Re-elected in 1952. Re-elected in 1954. Re-elected in 1956. Re-elected in 1958. Re-elected in 1960. Re-elected in 1962. Re-elected in 1964. Re-elected in 1966. Re-elected in 1968. Re-elected in 1970. Died.	1935–1953
John C. Watts (Nicholasville)	Democratic	April 4, 1951 – September 24, 1971	82nd 83rd 84th 85th 86th 87th 88th 89th 90th 91st 92nd	Elected to finish Underwood's term. Re-elected in 1952. Re-elected in 1954. Re-elected in 1956. Re-elected in 1958. Re-elected in 1960. Re-elected in 1962. Re-elected in 1964. Re-elected in 1966. Re-elected in 1968. Re-elected in 1970. Died.	1953–1957
John C. Watts (Nicholasville)	Democratic	April 4, 1951 – September 24, 1971	82nd 83rd 84th 85th 86th 87th 88th 89th 90th 91st 92nd	Elected to finish Underwood's term. Re-elected in 1952. Re-elected in 1954. Re-elected in 1956. Re-elected in 1958. Re-elected in 1960. Re-elected in 1962. Re-elected in 1964. Re-elected in 1966. Re-elected in 1968. Re-elected in 1970. Died.	1957–1963
John C. Watts (Nicholasville)	Democratic	April 4, 1951 – September 24, 1971	82nd 83rd 84th 85th 86th 87th 88th 89th 90th 91st 92nd	Elected to finish Underwood's term. Re-elected in 1952. Re-elected in 1954. Re-elected in 1956. Re-elected in 1958. Re-elected in 1960. Re-elected in 1962. Re-elected in 1964. Re-elected in 1966. Re-elected in 1968. Re-elected in 1970. Died.	1963–1967
John C. Watts (Nicholasville)	Democratic	April 4, 1951 – September 24, 1971	82nd 83rd 84th 85th 86th 87th 88th 89th 90th 91st 92nd	Elected to finish Underwood's term. Re-elected in 1952. Re-elected in 1954. Re-elected in 1956. Re-elected in 1958. Re-elected in 1960. Re-elected in 1962. Re-elected in 1964. Re-elected in 1966. Re-elected in 1968. Re-elected in 1970. Died.	1967–1973
Vacant		September 24, 1971 – December 4, 1971	92nd		1967–1973
William P. Curlin Jr. (Frankfort)	Democratic	December 4, 1971 – January 3, 1973	92nd	Elected to finish Watts's term. Retired.	1967–1973
John B. Breckinridge (Lexington)	Democratic	January 3, 1973 – January 3, 1979	93rd 94th 95th	Elected in 1972. Re-elected in 1974. Re-elected in 1976. Lost renomination.	1973–1983
Larry Hopkins (Lexington)	Republican	January 3, 1979 – January 3, 1993	96th 97th 98th 99th 100th 101st 102nd	Elected in 1978. Re-elected in 1980. Re-elected in 1982. Re-elected in 1984. Re-elected in 1986. Re-elected in 1988. Re-elected in 1990. Retired.	1973–1983
Larry Hopkins (Lexington)	Republican	January 3, 1979 – January 3, 1993	96th 97th 98th 99th 100th 101st 102nd	Elected in 1978. Re-elected in 1980. Re-elected in 1982. Re-elected in 1984. Re-elected in 1986. Re-elected in 1988. Re-elected in 1990. Retired.	1983–1993
Scotty Baesler (Lexington)	Democratic	January 3, 1993 – January 3, 1999	103rd 104th 105th	Elected in 1992. Re-elected in 1994. Re-elected in 1996. Retired to run for U.S. senator.	1993–1997
Scotty Baesler (Lexington)	Democratic	January 3, 1993 – January 3, 1999	103rd 104th 105th	Elected in 1992. Re-elected in 1994. Re-elected in 1996. Retired to run for U.S. senator.	1997–2003
Ernie Fletcher (Lexington)	Republican	January 3, 1999 – December 8, 2003	106th 107th 108th	Elected in 1998. Re-elected in 2000. Re-elected in 2002. Resigned after being elected Governor of Kentucky.	1997–2003
Ernie Fletcher (Lexington)	Republican	January 3, 1999 – December 8, 2003	106th 107th 108th	Elected in 1998. Re-elected in 2000. Re-elected in 2002. Resigned after being elected Governor of Kentucky.	2003–2013
Vacant		December 8, 2003 – February 17, 2004	108th		2003–2013
Ben Chandler (Versailles)	Democratic	February 17, 2004 – January 3, 2013	108th 109th 110th 111th 112th	Elected to finish Fletcher's term. Re-elected in 2004. Re-elected in 2006. Re-elected in 2008. Re-elected in 2010. Lost re-election.	2003–2013
Andy Barr (Lexington)	Republican	January 3, 2013 – present	113th 114th 115th 116th 117th 118th 119th	Elected in 2012. Re-elected in 2014. Re-elected in 2016. Re-elected in 2018. Re-elected in 2020. Re-elected in 2022. Re-elected in 2024. Retired to run for U.S. Senate.	2013–2023
Andy Barr (Lexington)	Republican	January 3, 2013 – present	113th 114th 115th 116th 117th 118th 119th	Elected in 2012. Re-elected in 2014. Re-elected in 2016. Re-elected in 2018. Re-elected in 2020. Re-elected in 2022. Re-elected in 2024. Retired to run for U.S. Senate.	2023–present
Zach Dembo (Lexington)	Democratic	Assuming office on January 3, 2027		Elected in 2026.	2023–present

== Recent election results ==
=== 2000 ===
Kentucky's 6th Congressional District Election (2000)
Party	Candidate	Votes	%
Republican	Ernie Fletcher*	142,971	52.80
Democratic	Scotty Baesler	94,167	34.77
Independent	Gatewood Galbraith	32,436	11.98
Libertarian	Joseph Novak	1,229	0.45
Total votes		270,803	100.00
Turnout			
Republican hold			

=== 2002 ===
Kentucky's 6th Congressional District Election (2002)
Party	Candidate	Votes	%
Republican	Ernie Fletcher*	115,622	71.95
Independent	Gatewood Galbraith	41,753	25.98
Libertarian	Mark Gailey	3,313	2.06
Total votes		160,688	100.00
Turnout			
Republican hold			

=== 2004 ===
Kentucky's 6th Congressional District Special Election (February 17, 2004)
Party	Candidate	Votes	%
Democratic	Ben Chandler	84,168	55.16
Republican	Alice Forgy Kerr	65,474	42.91
Libertarian	Mark Gailey	2,952	1.94
Total votes		152,594	100.00
Turnout			
Democratic gain from Republican			

Kentucky's 6th Congressional District General Election (2004)
Party	Candidate	Votes	%
Democratic	Ben Chandler*	175,355	58.61
Republican	Tom Buford	119,716	40.01
Independent	Stacy Abner	2,388	0.80
Libertarian	Mark Gailey	1,758	0.59
Total votes		299,217	100.00
Turnout			
Democratic hold			

=== 2006 ===
Kentucky's 6th Congressional District Election (2006)
Party	Candidate	Votes	%
Democratic	Ben Chandler*	158,869	85.46
Libertarian	Paul Ard	27,024	14.54
Total votes		185,893	100.00
Turnout			
Democratic hold			

=== 2008 ===
Kentucky's 6th Congressional District Election (2008)
Party	Candidate	Votes	%
Democratic	Ben Chandler*	203,764	64.66
Republican	Jon Larson	111,378	35.34
Total votes		315,142	100.00
Turnout			
Democratic hold			

=== 2010 ===
Kentucky's 6th Congressional District Election (2010)
Party	Candidate	Votes	%
Democratic	Ben Chandler*	119,812	50.08
Republican	Andy Barr	119,165	49.81
No party	C. Wes Collins	225	0.09
No party	Randolph S. Vance	22	0.01
Total votes		239,224	100.00
Turnout			
Democratic hold			

=== 2012 ===
Kentucky's 6th Congressional District Election (2012)
Party	Candidate	Votes	%
Republican	Andy Barr	153,222	50.57
Democratic	Ben Chandler*	141,438	46.70
No party	Randolph S. Vance	8,340	2.75
Total votes		303,000	100.00
Turnout			
Republican gain from Democratic			

=== 2014 ===
Kentucky's 6th Congressional District Election (2014)
Party	Candidate	Votes	%
Republican	Andy Barr*	147,404	59.99
Democratic	Elisabeth Jensen	98,290	40.01
Total votes		245,694	100.00
Turnout			
Republican hold			

=== 2016 ===
Kentucky's 6th Congressional District Election (2016)
Party	Candidate	Votes	%
Republican	Andy Barr*	202,099	61.09
Democratic	Nancy Jo Kemper	128,728	38.91
Total votes		330,827	100.00
Turnout			
Republican hold			

=== 2018 ===
Kentucky's 6th Congressional District, 2018
Party	Candidate	Votes	%	±%
Republican	Andy Barr (incumbent)	154,468	51.00%	−10.09%
Democratic	Amy McGrath	144,730	47.78%	+8.87%
Libertarian	Frank Harris	2,150	0.71%	N/A
Independent	Rikka Wallin	1,011	0.33%	N/A
Independent	James Germalic	522	0.17%	N/A
Margin of victory		9,738	3.22%	−18.96%
Total votes		302,881	100.0%	N/A
Republican hold				

=== 2020 ===
Kentucky's 6th congressional district, 2020
Party	Candidate	Votes	%
Republican	Andy Barr (incumbent)	216,948	57.3
Democratic	Josh Hicks	155,011	41.0
Libertarian	Frank Harris	6,491	1.7
Total votes		378,450	100.0
Republican hold			

=== 2022 ===
Kentucky's 6th congressional district, 2022
Party	Candidate	Votes	%
Republican	Andy Barr (incumbent)	154,762	62.7
Democratic	Geoff Young	83,005	33.6
	Maurice Randall Cravens (write-in)	8,970	3.6
	Maxwell Keith Froedge (write-in)	81	0.0
Total votes		246,818	100.0
Republican hold			

=== 2024 ===
Kentucky's 6th congressional district, 2024
Party	Candidate	Votes	%
Republican	Andy Barr (incumbent)	222,293	63.0
Democratic	Randy Cravens	130,345	37.0
Total votes		352,638	100.0
Republican hold			

== See also ==
- Kentucky's congressional districts
- List of United States congressional districts

U.S. House of Representatives
Preceded by Ohio's 8th congressional district	Home district of the speaker of the House; December 3, 1883 – March 4, 1889	Succeeded by Maine's 1st congressional district
