= Mary Jane Goodson Carlisle =

Political spouse from Kentucky

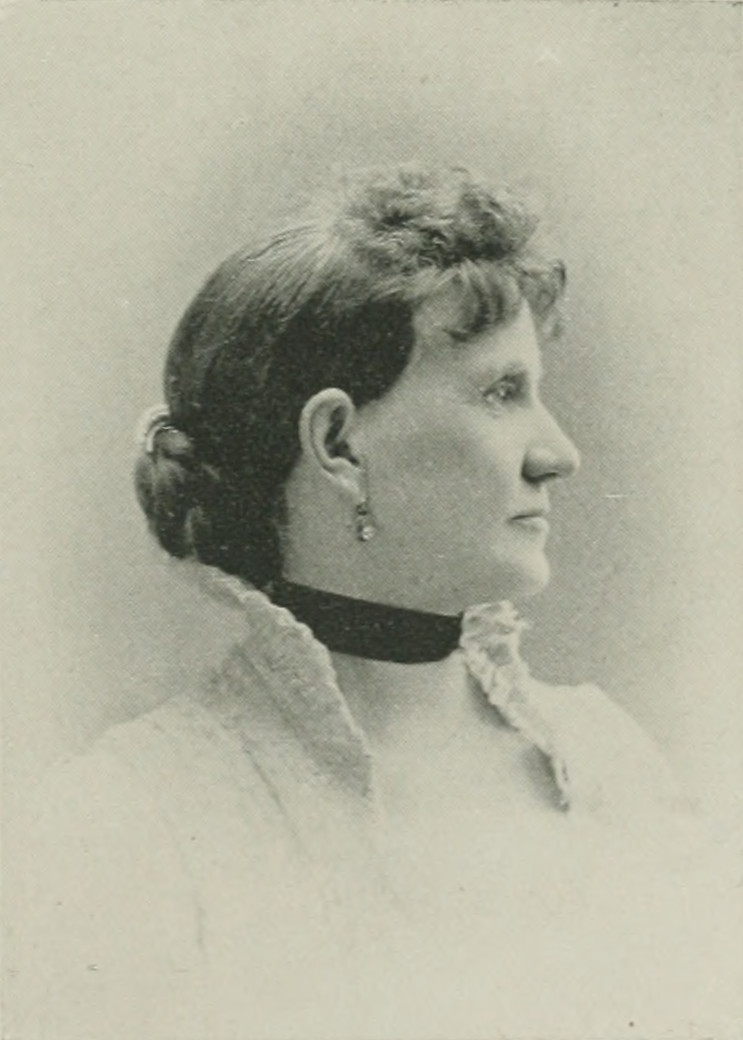
- "A Woman of the Century"

Personal details
- Born: Mary Jane Goodson; August 28, 1835 Covington, Kentucky, U.S.
- Died: August 4, 1905 (aged 69) Bay Shore, West Islip, Long Island, New York, U.S.
- Resting place: Linden Grove Cemetery, Covington, Kentucky
- Spouse: John G. Carlisle (m. 1857)
- Children: 2 sons
- Occupation: Political spouse; social leader; author

Mary Jane Goodson Carlisle (née, Goodson; August 28, 1835 – August 4, 1905) was a social leader from Kentucky. As the wife of politician John G. Carlisle, who served as speaker of the House, secretary of the Treasury, and as U.S. senator from Kentucky, Mary Jane Carlisle was prominent in Washington, D.C. social circles for many years. She was the lead author of Mrs. John G. Carlisle's Kentucky Cook Book, published in 1893. She died in 1905.

== Early life and education ==
Mary Jane Goodson was born in Covington, Kentucky, on August 28, 1835. She was educated in the Covington schools.

Her stepfather, Major John Allen Goodson, was a veteran of the War of 1812 who served several terms in the House of Representatives and the Senate, and was mayor of Covington for four years. He was said to bear a strong resemblance to General Andrew Jackson, both physically and mentally. At the age of 40, he married Hetty Wasson of Covington.

== Career ==
On January 25, 1857, Mary Jane Goodson married John Griffin Carlisle, a politician from Kentucky who became well known on the national stage. Carlisle was popular in Washington, D.C. social circles, and greatly aided her husband's political career. He served as 41st United States Secretary of the Treasury, 31st Speaker of the United States House of Representatives, Leader of the House Democratic Caucus, United States Senator from Kentucky, and 20th Lieutenant Governor of Kentucky.

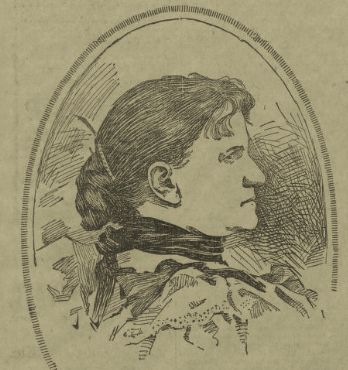
1896

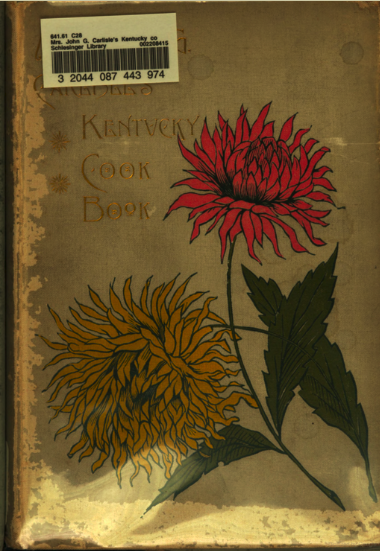
Mrs. John G. Carlisle's Kentucky cook book (1893)

In 1893, together with Mrs. Walter Q. Gresham, Mrs. General Crook, Mrs. W. A. Dudley, and others, she published Mrs. John G. Carlisle's Kentucky Cook Book: Containing Original Recipes, one-third of the recipes being devoted to sugar treats.

== Family ==
She was the mother of two sons, William Kinkaed Carlisle and Lilbon Logan Carlisle, who both became lawyers. Lilbon served as his father's private secretary while John G. Carlisle was secretary of the Treasury.

== Death ==
Mary Jane Goodson Carlisle died at her summer home in Bay Shore, West Islip, Long Island, New York on August 4, 1905. Her interment was at Linden Grove Cemetery, Covington, Kentucky.

== Selected works ==
- Mrs. John G. Carlisle's Kentucky Cook Book: Containing Original Recipes, by Mrs. John G. Carlisle, Mrs. Walter Q. Gresham, Mrs. General Crook, Mrs. W. A. Dudley, and others (1893)
