= Brent Spence =

American politician

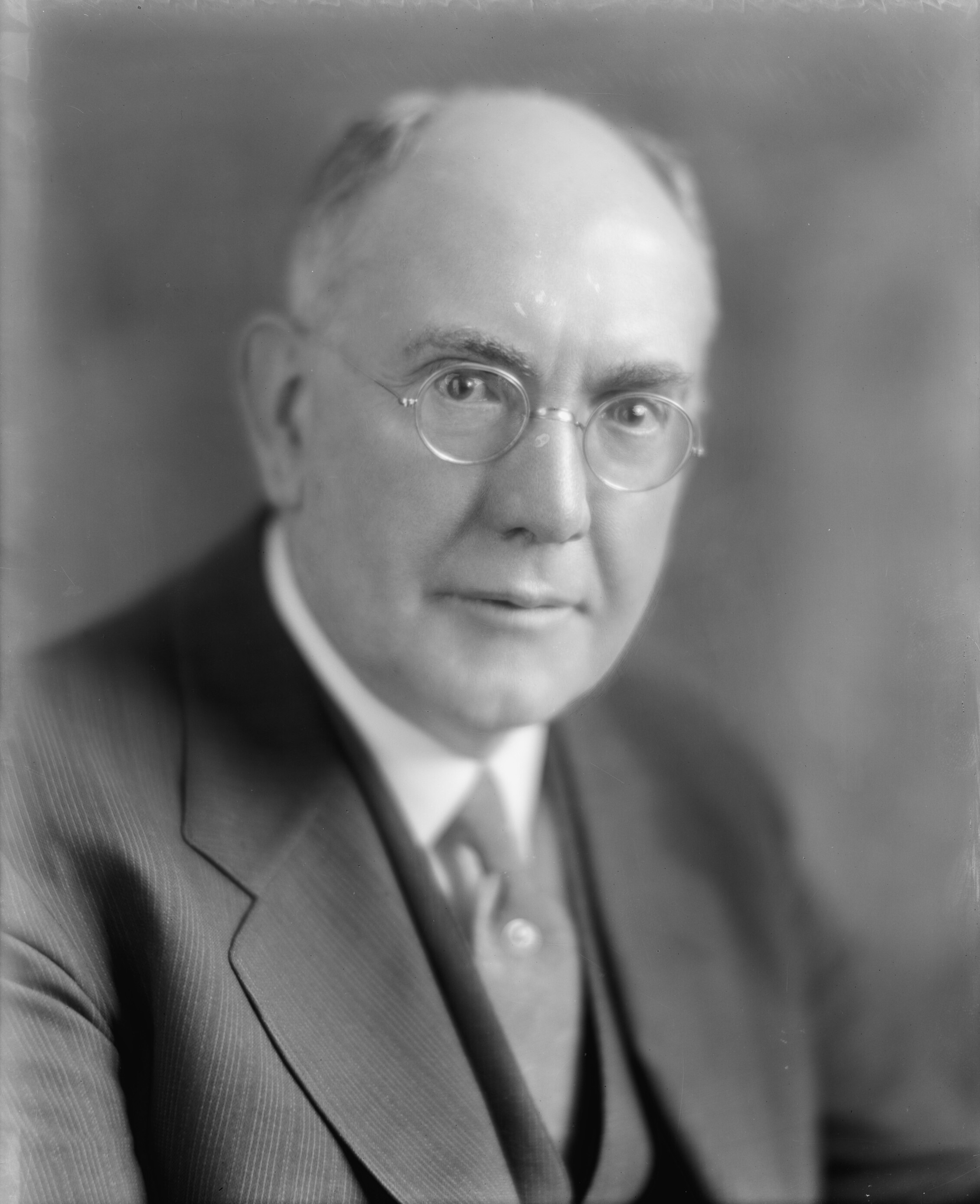

Member of the U.S. House of Representatives from Kentucky
- In office March 4, 1931 – January 3, 1963
- Preceded by: J. Lincoln Newhall
- Succeeded by: Frank Chelf (redistricting)
- Constituency: 6th district (1931–1933); At-large (1933–1935); 5th district (1935–1963)

Member of the Kentucky Senate
- In office 1904-1908

Personal details
- Born: December 24, 1874 Newport, Kentucky, U.S.
- Died: September 18, 1967 (aged 92) Fort Thomas, Kentucky, U.S.
- Party: Democratic
- Spouse: Ida Billerman
- Education: University of Cincinnati
- Occupation: lawyer

Brent Spence (December 24, 1874 – September 18, 1967), was an American politician. He was a long time Democratic Congressman, attorney, and banker from Northern Kentucky.

Spence was born in Newport, Kentucky to Philip and Virginia (Berry) Spence. He graduated from the University of Cincinnati in 1894 with a degree in law and was admitted to the bar that same year. He married Ida Bitterman on September 6, 1919.

He was very active in local and state politics, serving first in the Kentucky Senate, 1904–1908, then as city solicitor of Newport, 1916–1924. In 1930 he was elected to the U.S. House of Representatives from the 5th District; he held this position from March 4, 1931, until January 3, 1963, when most of his district was merged with the neighboring 4th District of fellow Democrat Frank Chelf. He lost the ensuring primary to Chelf. At the time of his retirement, Spence was one of the oldest members to serve in the House; he was 88 years old at the end of his career.

Spence chaired the U.S. House Banking and Currency Committee (1943–1963, except for four years when Republicans controlled Congress). He was a delegate to the 44-nation Bretton Woods Conference in 1944, to promote fair commerce. This led to creating the International Monetary Fund and Bank, and Spence's sponsoring legislation in Congress. Spence was a strong supporter of the New Deal and the Fair Deal. During President Roosevelt's administration, he supported the Agricultural Adjustment Act, the National Industrial Recovery Act, the Social Security Act, and the Reconstruction Finance Corporation. While Spence did not sign the 1956 Southern Manifesto and voted in favor of the 24th Amendment to the U.S. Constitution, he voted against passage of the Civil Rights Acts of 1957 and 1960.

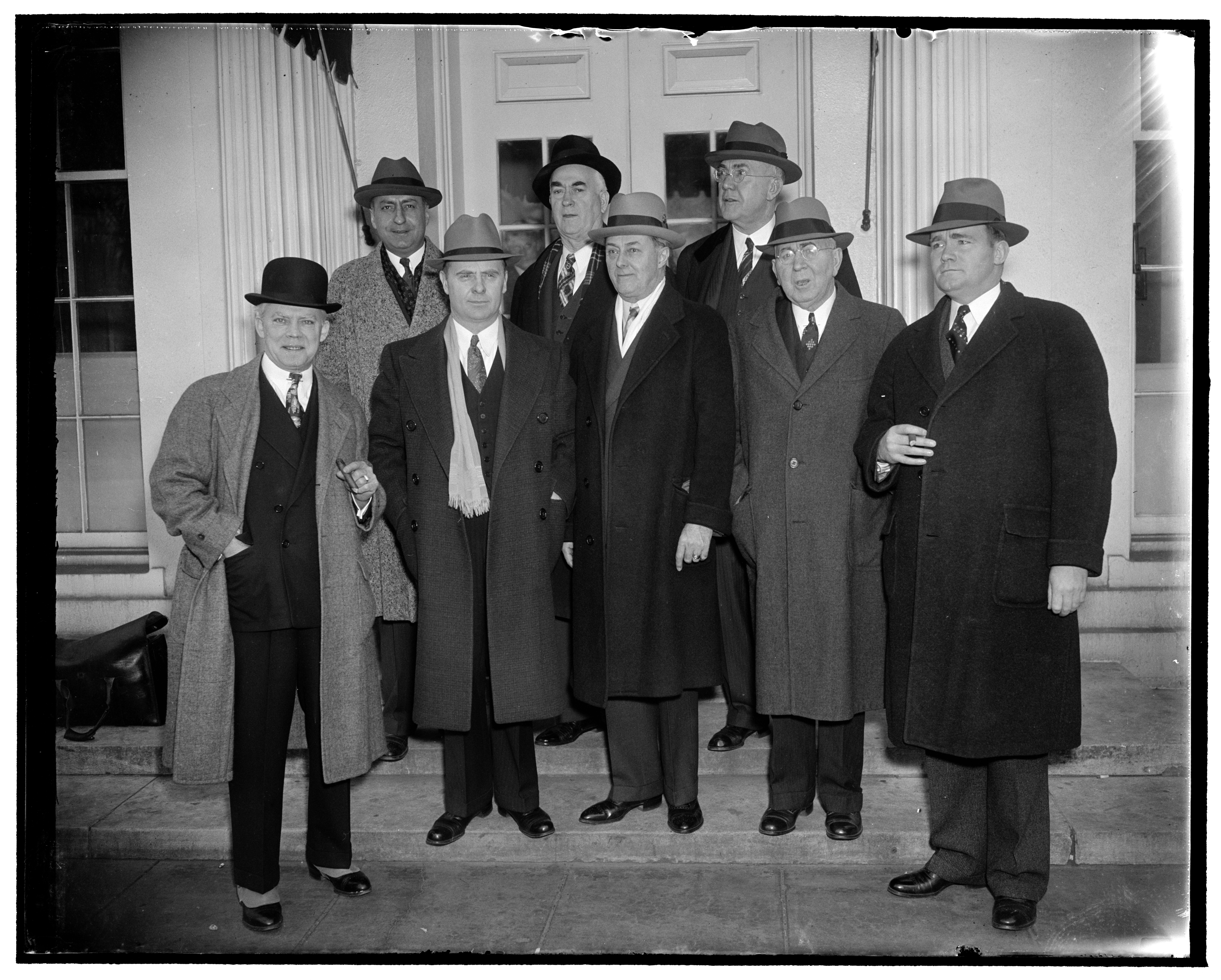
Group of legislators leaves White House after asking Franklin D. Roosevelt for $80,000,000 for flood control in Ohio Valley, March 7, 1938. Spence can be seen at right in the back row.

Altogether, Spence was a quiet man, and not a good public speaker. However, he was known for his impartial leadership and could get critical legislation passed. His background in banking is credited for leading him to sponsor the Export-Import Federal Deposit Insurance Act, which doubled insured savings accounts from $5,000 to $10,000.

The Brent Spence Bridge of I-75/I-71 which crosses the Ohio River at Covington, Kentucky is named for him. He resided in Fort Thomas, Kentucky at the time of his death. His funeral service was at St. Paul's Episcopal Church, Newport, where he was a lifetime member, then buried in Evergreen Cemetery (Southgate, Kentucky).

To date, he is the last Democrat to serve as representative from Kentucky's 5th congressional district.

U.S. House of Representatives
Preceded by J. Lincoln Newhall	U.S. Representative from Kentucky's 6th congressional district March 4, 1931–March 3, 1933	Succeeded by Virgil Chapman
New district	U.S. Representative from Kentucky's at-large congressional district March 4, 1933–January 3, 1935	Vacant District Suspended
Preceded by Maurice Thatcher	U.S. Representative from Kentucky's 5th congressional district January 3, 1935–January 3, 1963	Succeeded by Eugene Siler
Honorary titles
Preceded by Robert L. Doughton	Oldest member of the U.S. House of Representatives; 1953–1963	Succeeded by Thomas J. O'Brien
