= Ford Stone House =

Historic house in Kentucky, United States

- U.S. National Register of Historic Places
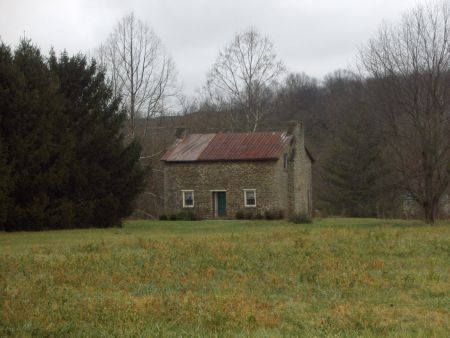

- Location within Kentucky Location within the United States
- Nearest city: Elliston, Grant County, Kentucky
- Coordinates: 38°43′00″N 84°44′59″W
- Area: 0.7 acres (0.28 ha)
- Built: c.1820
- NRHP reference No.: 80001532
- Added to NRHP: February 27, 1980

The Ford Stone House, located south of Elliston in Grant County, Kentucky, was built c. 1820. It was listed on the National Register of Historic Places in 1980.

It is a one-and-a-half-story cut stone house with exterior chimneys on both ends. The house was built facing south, but was later moved and faces north.

The house is located just west of Kentucky Route 1942 in the small community of Folsom, Kentucky (population 85).
