= Albert S. Berry =

American politician (1836–1908)

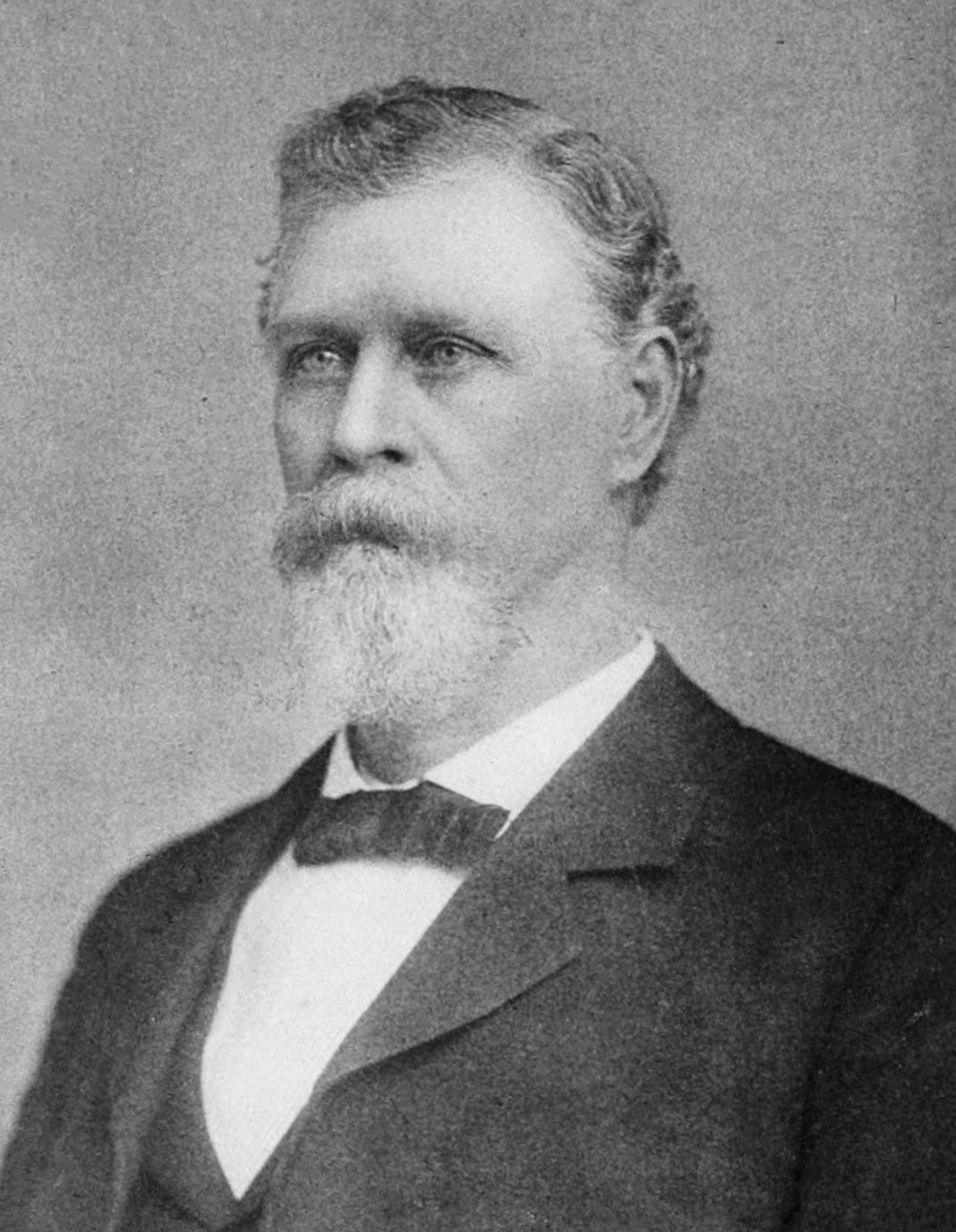

Member of the U.S. House of Representatives from Kentucky's 6th district
- In office March 4, 1893 – March 3, 1901
- Preceded by: William W. Dickerson
- Succeeded by: Daniel Linn Gooch

Member of the Kentucky Senate from the 25th district
- In office August 3, 1885 – August 5, 1889
- Preceded by: Edward Reily
- Succeeded by: John P. Newman
- In office August 6, 1877 – August 1, 1881
- Preceded by: George Baird Hodge
- Succeeded by: Edward Reily

Personal details
- Born: May 13, 1836 Dayton, Kentucky
- Died: January 6, 1908 (aged 71) Newport, Kentucky
- Resting place: Evergreen Cemetery
- Party: Democratic
- Education: Miami University; University of Cincinnati College of Law
- Profession: Lawyer

Military service
- Allegiance: Confederate States of America
- Branch/service: Confederate States Marine Corps
- Battles/wars: American Civil War

Albert Seaton Berry (May 13, 1836 – January 6, 1908) was a U.S. representative from Kentucky.

== Biography ==
Born in Fairfield (now Dayton), Campbell County, Kentucky, Berry attended the public schools. He graduated from Miami University, Oxford, Ohio, in 1855 and from the Cincinnati Law School in 1858. He was admitted to the bar and practiced law. He served as prosecuting attorney of Newport, Kentucky, in 1859. He served in the Confederate States Marine Corps throughout the Civil War. He served five terms as mayor of Newport, beginning in 1870. He represented the 25th district of the Kentucky Senate from 1877 to 1881 and 1885 to 1889, which comprised Campbell County.

Berry was elected as a Democrat to the Fifty-third and to the three succeeding Congresses (March 4, 1893 – March 3, 1901). He was an unsuccessful candidate for renomination in 1900.

He resumed the practice of law. He was appointed and subsequently elected judge of the seventeenth judicial district of Kentucky and served from 1905 until his death in Newport, Kentucky, January 6, 1908. He was interred in Evergreen Cemetery.

U.S. House of Representatives
Preceded by William W. Dickerson	Member of the U.S. House of Representatives from Kentucky's 6th congressional district March 4, 1893 – March 3, 1901	Succeeded by Daniel L. Gooch
