= John G. Carlisle =

American politician (1834–1910)

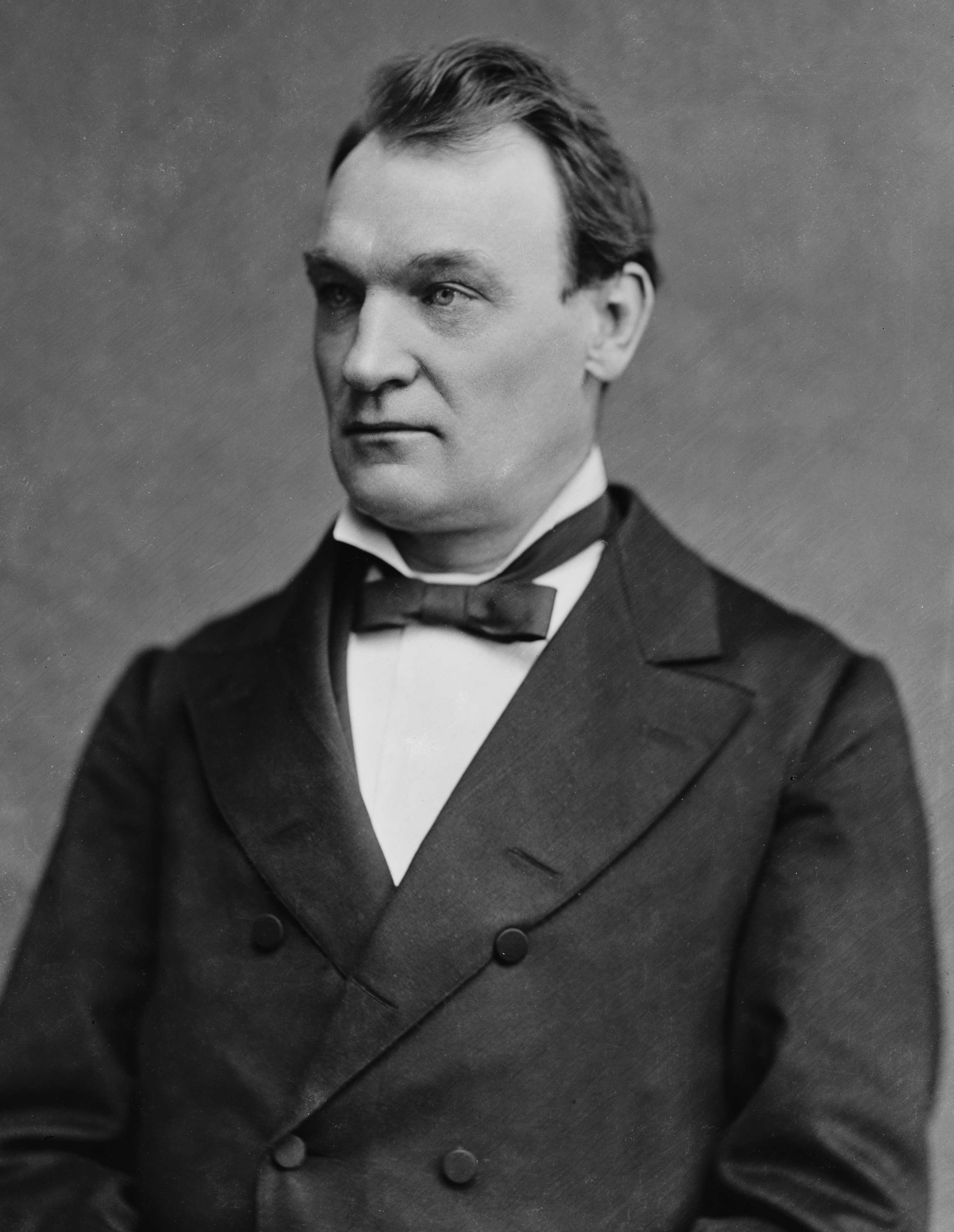
- Carlisle c. 1870–80

41st United States Secretary of the Treasury
- In office March 7, 1893 – March 5, 1897
- President: Grover Cleveland
- Preceded by: Charles Foster
- Succeeded by: Lyman J. Gage

United States Senator from Kentucky
- In office May 26, 1890 – February 4, 1893
- Preceded by: James B. Beck
- Succeeded by: William Lindsay

31st Speaker of the United States House of Representatives
- In office December 3, 1883 – March 3, 1889
- Preceded by: J. Warren Keifer
- Succeeded by: Thomas Reed

Leader of the House Democratic Caucus
- In office December 3, 1883 – March 3, 1889
- Preceded by: Samuel J. Randall
- Succeeded by: Charles Frederick Crisp

Member of the U.S. House of Representatives from Kentucky's 6th district
- In office March 4, 1877 – May 26, 1890
- Preceded by: Thomas Jones
- Succeeded by: William Dickerson

20th Lieutenant Governor of Kentucky
- In office September 5, 1871 – August 31, 1875
- Governor: Preston Leslie
- Preceded by: John W. Stevenson
- Succeeded by: John C. Underwood

Member of the Kentucky Senate from the 24th district
- In office August 1866 – September 5, 1871
- Preceded by: M. M. Benton
- Succeeded by: James B. Casey

Member of the Kentucky House of Representatives from Kenton County
- In office August 1, 1859 – August 5, 1861 Serving with John Ellis
- Preceded by: John Ellis; Robert Richardson
- Succeeded by: John W. Finnell; Green C. Smith

Personal details
- Born: John Griffin Carlisle; September 5, 1834 Campbell County, Kentucky, U.S. (now Kenton County)
- Died: July 31, 1910 (aged 75) New York City, U.S.
- Resting place: Linden Grove Cemetery
- Party: Democratic
- Spouse: Mary Goodson
- Children: 5
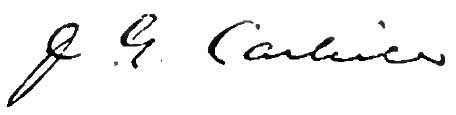
- Signature

John Griffin Carlisle (September 5, 1834 – July 31, 1910) was an American attorney and Democratic Party politician from Kentucky. He represented Kentucky in the United States House of Representatives from 1877 to 1890, serving as the 31st speaker of the House from 1883 to 1889, and served in the United States Senate from 1890 to 1893. He served as the 41st secretary of the treasury, in the second administration of President Grover Cleveland, from 1893 to 1897—a period that included the Panic of 1893. As a Bourbon Democrat he was a leader of the conservative, pro-business wing of the party, along with Cleveland.

== Biography ==
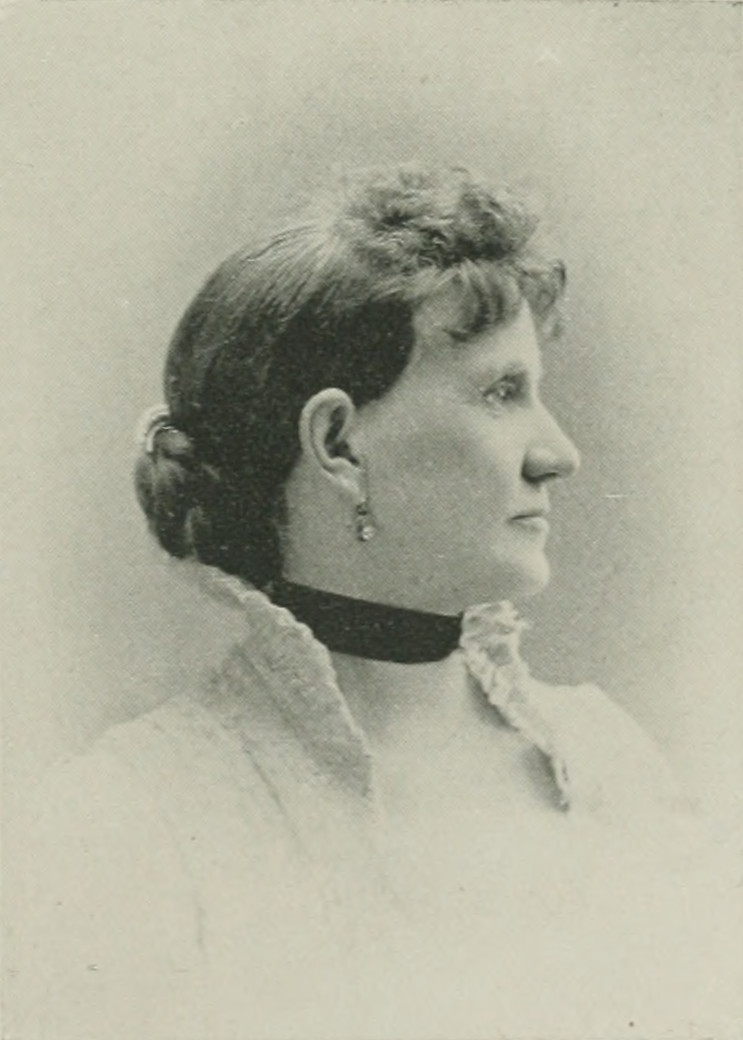
Mary Jane Goodson Carlisle

Carlisle was born in what is now Kenton County, Kentucky. He was well educated and took a post as a teacher in Covington, Kentucky. His father died in 1853 and he was left to support his family. He studied law under John W. Stevenson, and joined the law firm of William Kinkeard in Covington at the age of 23. Carlisle married Mary Jane Goodson on January 15, 1857, and they had five children, all of whom predeceased them.

Despite the political difficulties that taking a neutral position during the American Civil War caused him, Carlisle spent most of the 1860s in the Kentucky General Assembly, serving in the Kentucky House of Representatives and two terms in the Kentucky Senate, and was elected Lieutenant Governor of Kentucky in 1871, succeeding his former law mentor Stevenson.

=== House of Representatives ===
After Carlisle's term as Lieutenant governor ended in 1875, he ran for and won a seat in the United States House of Representatives for Kentucky's 6th district. On the main issues of the day, Carlisle was in favor of coining silver, but not for free coinage, and favored lower tariffs. He became a leader of the low-tariff wing of the Democratic Party, and was chosen by House Democrats to become Speaker in 1883 over Samuel J. Randall, a leader of the party's protectionist wing.

As Speaker, Carlisle was both admired for and handicapped by his fairness and congeniality:

His name belongs in the short list of great Speakers. His opinions read like the decisions of an eminent judge. His impartiality and the sweetness of his manner prompted the minority members to present him a loving-cup as an evidence of their affection. But dilatory motions, the disappearing quorum, and his refusal to ascertain the presence of a quorum by counting the House made him the slave of filibusters.

"[H]e is the ablest man they have on that side of the House," said his Republican rival and successor Thomas Brackett Reed, "[b]ut no Speaker could do any better with his hands tied by the rules we are working under."

Carlisle became a leader of the conservative Bourbon Democrats and was mentioned as a presidential candidate but the Democrats passed him over at their conventions for Winfield S. Hancock in 1880 and Grover Cleveland in 1884. Discomfort with nominating a southerner after the Civil War played a role in Carlisle's failure to win either nomination. In 1892 Carlisle was again proposed as a candidate for president at the Democratic convention, but this time Carlisle asked that he not be considered. It was reported at the time that Carlisle dropped out with the understanding that Cleveland, once re-elected, would appoint him to his Cabinet.

=== Senate and Treasury Department ===
In May 1890, the Kentucky legislature elected Carlisle to the United States Senate to fill the nearly four years remaining in the unexpired term of the late Sen. James B. Beck. He served until February 1893, when he resigned to become Secretary of the Treasury under Cleveland, who had been elected president in November 1892.

Carlisle's tenure as Secretary was marred by the Panic of 1893, a financial and economic disaster so severe that it ended Carlisle's political career. In response to a run on the American gold supply, Carlisle felt forced to end silver coinage. He also felt compelled to oppose the 1894 Wilson–Gorman Tariff bill. These two stands were widely unpopular among agrarian Democrats. In 1896 Carlisle strenuously opposed Democratic presidential nominee William Jennings Bryan, supporting a splinter Gold Democrat candidate, once-Illinois Governor Palmer, instead.

By 1896, the once remarkably popular Carlisle was so disliked due to his stewardship of the currency that he was forced to leave the stage in the middle of a speech in his home town of Covington due to a barrage of abuse. Feeling rejected, he retired from public life and sold his house in Covington.

=== Later career and death ===
By May 1899, the North American Trust Company had directors such as John G. Carlisle, Adlai E. Stevenson, and Wager Swayne.

He moved to New York City, where he practiced law, and died on July 31, 1910, at age 75, and is buried in Linden Grove Cemetery in Covington, Kentucky.

== Legacy ==
Carlisle County, Kentucky was established in 1886.

Political offices
Preceded by Preston Leslie	Lieutenant Governor of Kentucky; 1871–1875	Succeeded by John C. Underwood
Preceded by J. Warren Keifer	Speaker of the United States House of Representatives; 1883–1889	Succeeded by Thomas Reed
Preceded by Charles Foster	United States Secretary of the Treasury; 1893–1897	Succeeded by Lyman J. Gage
U.S. House of Representatives
Preceded by Thomas Jones	Member of the U.S. House of Representatives from Kentucky's 6th congressional district 1877–1890	Succeeded by William Dickerson
Preceded by J. Warren Keifer	Chair of the House Rules Committee; 1883–1889	Succeeded by Thomas Reed
U.S. Senate
Preceded by James B. Beck	U.S. Senator (Class 2) from Kentucky; 1890–1893; Served alongside: Joseph Blackburn	Succeeded by William Lindsay
