= Orie S. Ware =

American politician (1882–1974)

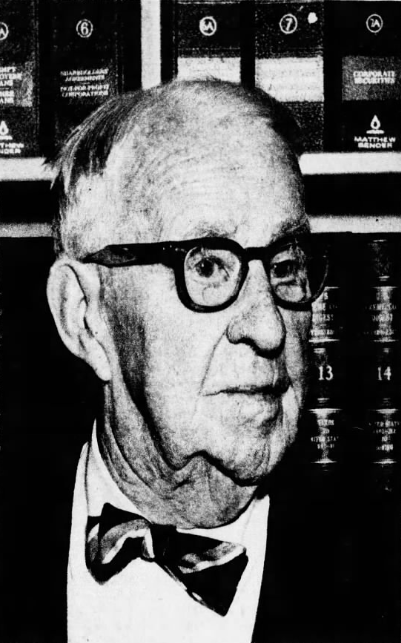
- Ware in 1974

Member of the U.S. House of Representatives from Kentucky's 6th district
- In office March 4, 1927 – March 3, 1929
- Preceded by: Arthur B. Rouse
- Succeeded by: J. Lincoln Newhall

Personal details
- Born: Orie Solomon Ware; May 11, 1882 Peach Grove, Kentucky, U.S.
- Died: December 16, 1974 (aged 92) Fort Mitchell, Kentucky, U.S.
- Party: Democratic
- Education: University of Cincinnati

Orie Solomon Ware (May 11, 1882 – December 16, 1974) was an American jurist and politician who served as a member of the U.S. House of Representatives from Kentucky's 6th congressional district from 1927 to 1929.

Born in Peach Grove, Kentucky, Ware attended public school in Covington. He graduated from the private academy of George W. Dunlap at Independence in 1889, and from the law department of the University of Cincinnati in 1903. He was admitted to the bar in 1903 and commenced practice in Covington. He also engaged in banking, serving as a director of the First National Bank and Trust Company.

Ware was as delegate to all Democratic Party state conventions from 1910 to 1939. He served as postmaster of Covington from September 1, 1914, to July 1, 1921, and as commonwealth attorney of the sixteenth judicial circuit from January 1, 1922, to February 1, 1927, when he resigned. He was elected as a Democrat to the 70th United States Congress and was not a candidate for re-nomination for a second term. He served as circuit judge from 1957 to 1958, and resumed the practice of law in Covington. Ware resided in Fort Mitchell, where he died on December 16, 1974. He was interred in Highland Cemetery.

== Electoral history ==
Electoral history of Orie S. Ware
Year	Office		Party	Votes			Result	Swing	Ref.
Year	Office		Party	Total	%	P.	Result	Swing	Ref.
1926	U.S. House	6th	Democratic	26,063	57.22	1st	Won	Hold	
Source: Clerk of the U.S. House | Election Statistics

U.S. House of Representatives
Preceded by Arthur B. Rouse	Member of the U.S. House of Representatives from Kentucky's 6th congressional district March 4, 1927 – March 3, 1929	Succeeded by J. Lincoln Newhall
