= Andrew H. Ward =

American politician

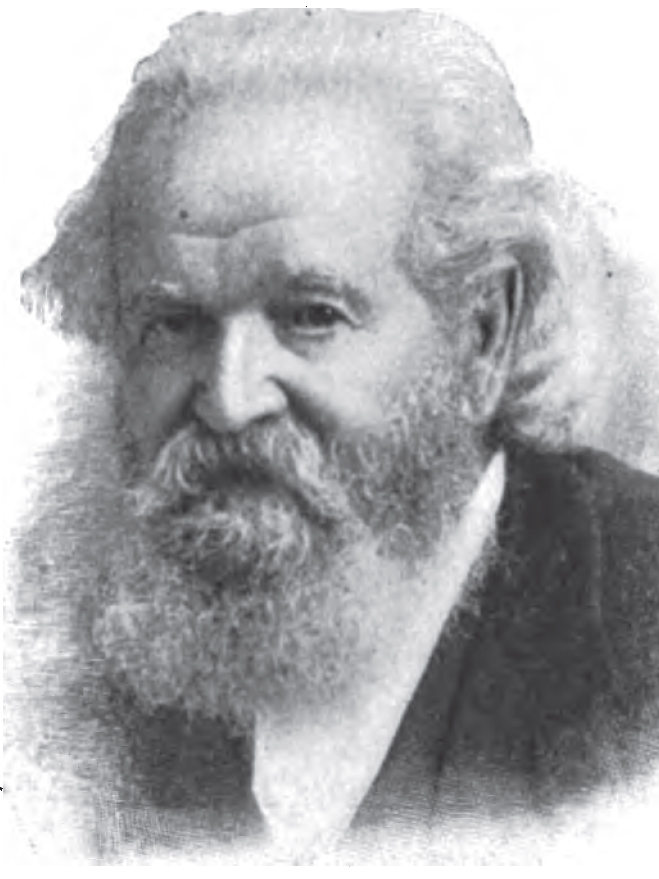

Member of the U.S. House of Representatives from Kentucky's 6th district
- In office December 3, 1866 – March 3, 1867
- Preceded by: Green Clay Smith
- Succeeded by: Thomas Laurens Jones

Member of the Kentucky House of Representatives from Harrison County
- In office August 3, 1863 – August 7, 1865
- Preceded by: Lucius Desha
- Succeeded by: Hugh Newell

Personal details
- Born: January 3, 1815 Harrison County, Kentucky
- Died: April 16, 1904 (aged 89) Cynthiana, Kentucky
- Resting place: Battle Grove Cemetery
- Party: Whig; Democrat
- Spouse(s): Ellen V. Moore; Elizabeth Ware; Helen H. Lair
- Education: Transylvania University
- Profession: Lawyer

Andrew Harrison Ward (January 3, 1815 – April 16, 1904) was a U.S. representative from Kentucky.

== Early life and family ==
Andrew H. Ward was born near Cynthiana in Harrison County, Kentucky. He was the son of Andrew and Elizabeth (Headington) Ward. Ward was named for his father and for William Henry Harrison, under whom his father served in the War of 1812.

Ward attended the county schools, then matriculated to Transylvania University in Lexington, Kentucky. He served as clerk on a steamboat on the Tombigbee River for several years. He began to study law in 1842 and was admitted to the bar in 1844, commencing practice in Cynthiana.

In 1846, Ward married Ellen V. Moore. The couple had one daughter (Mollie M. Ward Gaddy) before Ellen V. Moore Ward died in 1848. Ward married Elizabeth Ware on December 31, 1857; she died in 1865, leaving no children. On April 28, 1868, he married Helen H. Lair. The couple had two daughters – Bertie M. (Ward) Lafferty and Catherine Ward – and three sons – Harry R. Ward, Paul S. Ward, and Ashley F. Ward.

== Political career ==
During his early political career, Ward was affiliated with the Whig Party, but after the dissolution of the Whigs, he associated himself with the Democratic Party. He was elected city attorney of Cynthiana in 1860. In 1861, Ward unsuccessfully sought election to the Kentucky House of Representatives but was elected to that chamber two years later, serving a single, two-year term. He was an unsuccessful candidate for election to the Thirty-ninth Congress in 1864 but was later elected to represent the Sixth District to the 39th Congress to fill the vacancy caused by the resignation of Green Clay Smith. He served from December 3, 1866, to March 3, 1867, and was not a candidate for renomination in 1866.

Although he never formally enlisted for service in the American Civil War, he opposed secession and was among the 330 citizens who successfully resisted John Hunt Morgan's raid on Cynthiana in 1864.

== Later life and death ==
Following his tenure in Congress, Ward resumed the practice of law. He defended the first case of treason tried in Kentucky. He practiced law into his eighties, and the maximum penalty ever imposed on one of his clients was ten years in the penitentiary. Concurrent with his late law practice, he served as president of the National Bank of Cynthiana and was Sunday school superintendent at the local Christian church. He died in Cynthiana, Kentucky, on April 16, 1904, and was interred in Battle Grove Cemetery.

U.S. House of Representatives
Preceded by Green C. Smith	Member of the U.S. House of Representatives from Kentucky's 6th congressional district 1866 – 1867	Succeeded by Thomas L. Jones
