= Joseph L. Rhinock =

American politician

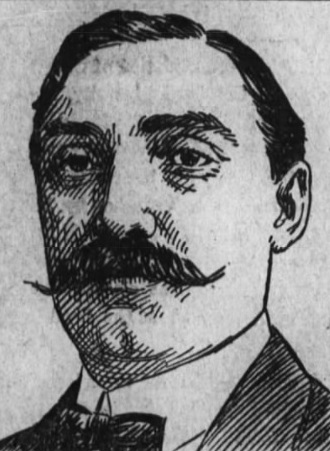
- The Advocate-Messenger (Danville, KY), November 1, 1910

Member of the U.S. House of Representatives from Kentucky's 6th district
- In office March 4, 1905 – March 3, 1911
- Preceded by: Daniel Linn Gooch
- Succeeded by: Arthur B. Rouse

Mayor of Covington, Kentucky
- In office 1893–1900
- Preceded by: James T. Thomas
- Succeeded by: William A. Johnson

Personal details
- Born: Joseph Lafayette Rhinock; January 4, 1863 Owenton, Kentucky, U.S.
- Died: September 20, 1926 (aged 63) New Rochelle, New York
- Resting place: Covington, Kentucky, U.S.
- Party: Democratic
- Occupation: Businessman

Joseph Lafayette Rhinock (January 4, 1863 – September 20, 1926) was a U.S. representative from Kentucky, businessman and mayor. Born in Owenton, Kentucky, Rhinock moved during his childhood to Covington, Kentucky, attending public school there.

== Biography ==
Initially, Rhinock entered the oil refinery industry, and served as president of the Covington Public Library Board two terms. After this, he served as member of the Covington city council, going on to serve as mayor between 1893 and 1900.

Rhinock was elected as a Democrat to the 59th, 60th, and 61st Congresses (serving between March 4, 1905, and March 3, 1911), but was not a candidate for renomination in 1910.

For 22 years, Rhinock was connected with theater in New York City and Cincinnati, Ohio, serving as vice president, secretary, and treasurer of the Shubert Organization theater company. He served as vice president of the Loews Theater. Rhinock later became actively interested in horse racing and racetrack corporations.

Rhinock died at his home in the Bonnie Crest neighborhood of New Rochelle in Westchester County, New York, on September 20, 1926, aged 63. He was interred in Highland Cemetery, Covington.

U.S. House of Representatives
Preceded by Daniel L. Gooch	Member of the U.S. House of Representatives from Kentucky's 6th congressional district March 4, 1905 – March 3, 1911	Succeeded by Arthur B. Rouse
