= Hereditary Order of Descendants of Colonial Governors =

The Hereditary Order of Descendants of Colonial Governors (HODCG) is a hereditary society composed of men and women who can prove their descent from a colonial-era governor. Founded in 1896 Miss Mary Cabell Richardson of Covington, Kentucky, the Order's mission is to "commemorate the services of those men who, prior to July 4, 1776, singly exercised supreme executive power in the American colonies and who laid in them the foundations of stable government and of the respect for the civil law and authority which made the maintenance of their future independence possible." The Order is listed as an approved lineage society with the Hereditary Society Community of the United States of America.

== History ==
The first two Governors General served the Order for the first seven years of its existence. In 1903, Miss Gail Treat of East Orange, New Jersey, became the new Governor General of the Order. Ms Treat was a descendant of Robert Treat, whose served as governor from 1683-1698. Miss Treat would serve as Governor General from 1903 to 1944 and upon her death all of the records of the Order vanished and the group entered a period of dormancy.

In 1954 a group of members reorganized the Order and sought to preserve whatever records and information they could locate. The Order published a register of known members in 1980, and in 2004 the Lineage Book II was produced. In 2006, the Order published a comprehensive list of the Colonial Governors Prior to July 4, 1776. The Order presently consists of over 500 members throughout the United States of America and overseas and has its annual meeting in April of each year in Washington, DC, at the Metropolitan Club, as well as a reception each November at the Racquet and Tennis Club, in New York City.

== Resources ==
The Hereditary Society Community of the United States of America
