= Evergreen Cemetery (Southgate, Kentucky) =

Cemetery in Campbell County, Kentucky

Coordinates: 39°04′00″N 84°28′20″W

- Interactive map of Evergreen Cemetery

Details
- Established: 1840s
- Location: 25 Alexandria Pike, Southgate, Kentucky
- Size: 250 acres (100 ha)

Evergreen Cemetery (Southgate, Kentucky) is the largest cemetery in Campbell County, Kentucky. It is still in operation and is located at 25 Alexandria Pike in Southgate, Kentucky. The Cemetery was begun in the 1840s, to replace the Newport, Cemetery. The cemetery was located a few miles south of Newport, in a rural area, which is now the City of Southgate, Kentucky.

A defensive earthwork named Shaler Battery, built as part of the Defense of Cincinnati, remains preserved within the cemetery and is located adjacent to the cemetery bandstand. It was one of the 28 artillery batteries that were built on northern Kentucky hilltops from 1861 to 1863.

A residence for the sexton of the cemetery was constructed in 1872. Seven years later, in 1879, the name of the cemetery was officially acknowledged as Evergreen. By 1902, a chapel had been constructed on the cemetery grounds and was used for funeral services and layouts.

The cemetery was used as the cemetery in the 1988 film Rain Man.

Today, the cemetery contains 250 acres (1.0 km^{2}) and accepts burials from throughout the region.

== Notable burials ==
- James Taylor Jr. – General considered the founder of Newport
- Brent Spence – Democratic Congressman
- Thomas M. Doherty – Spanish–American War Medal of Honor recipient
- William H. Horsfall – American Civil War Medal of Honor recipient
