= Sherman, Kentucky =

Unincorporated community in United States of America

Coordinates: 38°43′57″N 84°35′48″W

Sherman is an unincorporated community in Grant County, Kentucky, United States.

== History ==
A post office called Sherman was established in 1865, and remained in operation until it was discontinued in 1969. In the 1870s, enterprises in Sherman included a store, blacksmith, and school.

== Notable person ==
- William Worth Dickerson, Congressman.
