= Grant County, Kentucky =

County in Kentucky, United States

- County
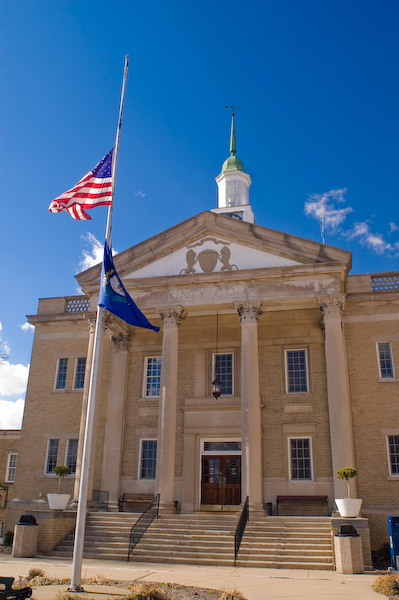
- The Grant County historic courthouse in Williamstown

- Location within the U.S. state of Kentucky
- Coordinates: 38°38′N 84°37′W
- Country: United States
- State: Kentucky
- Founded: 1820
- Seat: Williamstown
- Largest city: Williamstown

Government
  - Judge/Executive: Chuck Dills (R)

Area
  - Total: 261 sq mi (680 km^{2})
  - Land: 258 sq mi (670 km^{2})
  - Water: 2.8 sq mi (7.3 km^{2}) 1.1%

Population (2020)
  - Total: 24,941
  - Estimate (2025): 26,181 ▲
  - Density: 96.7/sq mi (37.3/km^{2})
- Time zone: UTC−5 (Eastern)
  - Summer (DST): UTC−4 (EDT)
- Congressional district: 4th
- Website: grantcounty.ky.gov

Grant County is a county located in the northern part of the U.S. commonwealth of Kentucky. As of the 2020 census, the population was 24,941. Its county seat is Williamstown. The county was formed in 1820 and named for Colonel John Grant, who led a party of settlers in 1779 to establish Grant's Station, in today's Bourbon County, Kentucky. Grant County is included in the Cincinnati-Middletown, OH-KY-IN Metropolitan Statistical Area. Grant County residents voted to allow full alcohol sales in the county by a margin of 56% to 44% in a special election on December 22, 2015. In the 19th century, Grant County had multiple saloons.

The Grant County News, established in 1906 and published in Williamstown, is preserved on microfilm by the University of Kentucky Libraries. The microfilm holdings are listed in a master negative database on the UK Libraries Preservation and Digital Programs website.

== History ==
Grant County was established in 1820 from land taken from Pendleton County. The historic courthouse, built in 1939, replaced two earlier structures. A new judicial center was completed in April 2010. In 1975, many residents reported seeing a UFO at Williamstown Lake.

== Geography ==
According to the United States Census Bureau, the county has a total area of 261 square miles (680 km^{2}), of which 258 square miles (670 km^{2}) is land and 2.8 square miles (7.3 km^{2}) (1.1%) is water.

=== Adjacent counties ===
- Boone County (north)
- Kenton County (northeast)
- Pendleton County (east)
- Harrison County (southeast)
- Scott County (south)
- Owen County (west)
- Gallatin County (northwest)

== Demographics ==
Historical population
Census	Pop.	Note	%±
1830	2,986		—
1840	4,192		40.4%
1850	6,531		55.8%
1860	8,356		27.9%
1870	9,529		14.0%
1880	13,083		37.3%
1890	12,671		−3.1%
1900	13,239		4.5%
1910	10,581		−20.1%
1920	10,435		−1.4%
1930	9,876		−5.4%
1940	9,876		0.0%
1950	9,809		−0.7%
1960	9,489		−3.3%
1970	9,999		5.4%
1980	13,308		33.1%
1990	15,737		18.3%
2000	22,384		42.2%
2010	24,682		10.3%
2020	24,941		1.0%
2025 (est.)	26,181	▲	5.0%
U.S. Decennial Census; 1790-1960 1900-1990; 1990-2000 2010-2020

=== 2020 census ===
As of the 2020 census, the county had a population of 24,941. The median age was 38.0 years. 26.2% of residents were under the age of 18 and 14.6% of residents were 65 years of age or older. For every 100 females there were 99.5 males, and for every 100 females age 18 and over there were 98.8 males age 18 and over.

The racial makeup of the county was 92.2% White, 0.8% Black or African American, 0.2% American Indian and Alaska Native, 0.3% Asian, 0.1% Native Hawaiian and Pacific Islander, 1.3% from some other race, and 5.1% from two or more races. Hispanic or Latino residents of any race comprised 3.0% of the population.

0.0% of residents lived in urban areas, while 100.0% lived in rural areas.

There were 8,995 households in the county, of which 36.8% had children under the age of 18 living with them and 23.3% had a female householder with no spouse or partner present. About 22.5% of all households were made up of individuals and 9.4% had someone living alone who was 65 years of age or older.

There were 10,050 housing units, of which 10.5% were vacant. Among occupied housing units, 70.6% were owner-occupied and 29.4% were renter-occupied. The homeowner vacancy rate was 1.3% and the rental vacancy rate was 4.5%.

=== 2000 census ===
As of the census of 2000, there were 22,384 people, 8,175 households, and 6,221 families residing in the county. The population density was 86 per square mile (33/km^{2}). There were 9,306 housing units at an average density of 36 per square mile (14/km^{2}). The racial makeup of the county was 98.31% White, 0.25% Black or African American, 0.23% Native American, 0.29% Asian, 0.05% Pacific Islander, 0.32% from other races, and 0.54% from two or more races. 1.04% of the population were Hispanic or Latino of any race.

There were 8,175 households, out of which 39.60% had children under the age of 18 living with them, 60.10% were married couples living together, 11.10% had a female householder with no husband present, and 23.90% were non-families. 19.80% of all households were made up of individuals, and 8.20% had someone living alone who was 65 years of age or older. The average household size was 2.72 and the average family size was 3.10.

In the county, the population was spread out, with 28.70% under the age of 18, 9.40% from 18 to 24, 31.50% from 25 to 44, 20.90% from 45 to 64, and 9.50% who were 65 years of age or older. The median age was 33 years. For every 100 females there were 97.10 males. For every 100 females age 18 and over, there were 94.80 males.

The median income for a household in the county was $38,438, and the median income for a family was $42,605. Males had a median income of $31,987 versus $23,669 for females. The per capita income for the county was $16,776. About 9.00% of families and 11.10% of the population were below the poverty line, including 15.10% of those under age 18 and 13.40% of those age 65 or over.

== Education ==
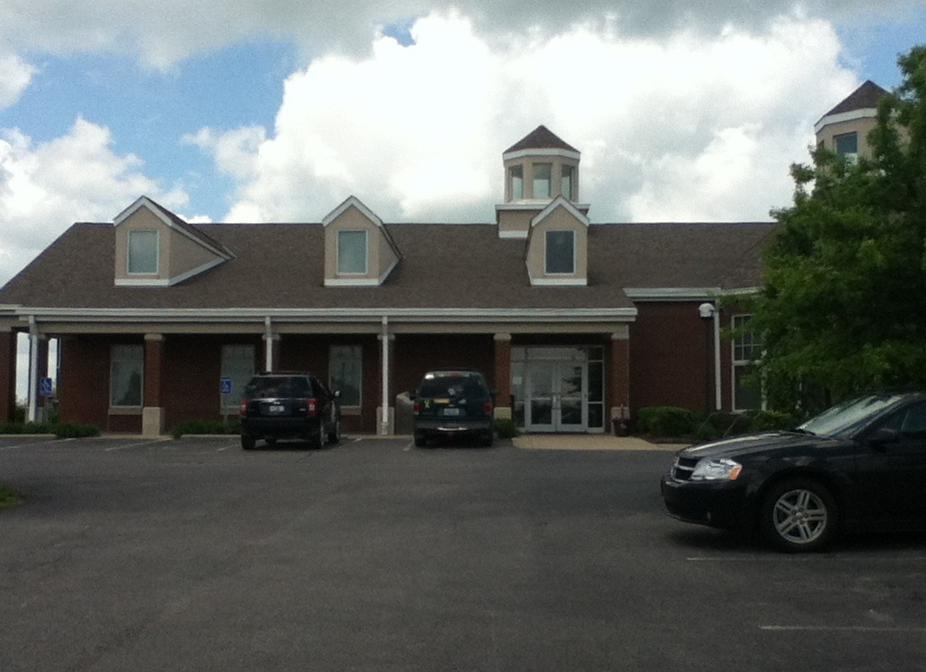
The Grant County Library

Grant County has six schools: Crittenden Mt Zion (CMZ), Dry Ridge Elementary (DRE), Sherman Elementary (SES), Mason Corinth Elementary (MCE), Grant County Middle School (GCMS), Grant County High School (GCHS) and Williamstown Independent Schools (WES)- (WMS) – (WHS).

Grant County's only library is located in Williamstown.

== Politics ==
United States presidential election results for Grant County, Kentucky
Year	Republican		Democratic		Third party(ies)	
Year	No.	%	No.	%	No.	%
1912	837	32.43%	1,562	60.52%	182	7.05%
1916	1,078	36.44%	1,841	62.24%	39	1.32%
1920	1,613	37.19%	2,686	61.93%	38	0.88%
1924	1,404	39.45%	1,923	54.03%	232	6.52%
1928	2,448	59.48%	1,662	40.38%	6	0.15%
1932	1,407	30.64%	3,148	68.55%	37	0.81%
1936	1,353	34.35%	2,560	64.99%	26	0.66%
1940	1,535	35.96%	2,729	63.93%	5	0.12%
1944	1,621	40.05%	2,413	59.62%	13	0.32%
1948	1,154	30.22%	2,633	68.94%	32	0.84%
1952	1,609	38.67%	2,545	61.16%	7	0.17%
1956	1,680	42.04%	2,300	57.56%	16	0.40%
1960	2,163	53.25%	1,899	46.75%	0	0.00%
1964	1,068	30.13%	2,461	69.42%	16	0.45%
1968	1,386	39.35%	1,169	33.19%	967	27.46%
1972	2,086	64.03%	1,054	32.35%	118	3.62%
1976	1,212	33.35%	2,336	64.28%	86	2.37%
1980	1,779	42.53%	2,272	54.32%	132	3.16%
1984	2,840	61.70%	1,685	36.61%	78	1.69%
1988	2,835	59.05%	1,896	39.49%	70	1.46%
1992	2,128	39.44%	2,097	38.87%	1,170	21.69%
1996	2,697	45.43%	2,541	42.80%	699	11.77%
2000	4,405	62.02%	2,568	36.15%	130	1.83%
2004	5,951	67.44%	2,818	31.94%	55	0.62%
2008	5,510	62.94%	3,112	35.55%	132	1.51%
2012	5,664	65.80%	2,810	32.64%	134	1.56%
2016	7,268	76.03%	1,910	19.98%	381	3.99%
2020	8,725	78.55%	2,205	19.85%	178	1.60%
2024	9,372	81.72%	1,944	16.95%	153	1.33%

=== Elected officials ===
Elected officials as of January 3, 2025
U.S. House	Thomas Massie (R)	KY 4
Ky. Senate	Matt Nunn (R)	17
Ky. House	Savannah Maddox (R)	61

== Infrastructure ==
=== Transportation ===
Public transportation is provided by Senior Services of Northern Kentucky with demand-response service.

== Notable attractions ==
Grant County, specifically in Williamstown, is the location of the Ark Encounter, operated by the Christian apologetics organization Answers in Genesis and opened in 2016.

== Communities ==
=== Cities ===
- Corinth
- Crittenden
- Dry Ridge
- Williamstown (county seat)

=== Unincorporated community ===
- Jonesville

== See also ==
- National Register of Historic Places listings in Grant County, Kentucky
