= Southgate, Kentucky =

- City
- Location of Southgate in Campbell County, Kentucky.
- Coordinates: 39°03′47″N 84°28′17″W
- Country: United States
- State: Kentucky
- County: Campbell

Government
  - Type: Mayor-Council
  - Mayor: Jim Hamberg

Area
  - Total: 1.46 sq mi (3.78 km^{2})
  - Land: 1.46 sq mi (3.78 km^{2})
  - Water: 0.0039 sq mi (0.01 km^{2})
- Elevation: 581 ft (177 m)

Population (2020)
  - Total: 3,648
  - Estimate (2024): 3,802
  - Density: 2,500/sq mi (966/km^{2})
- Time zone: UTC-5 (Eastern (EST))
  - Summer (DST): UTC-4 (EDT)
- ZIP code: 41071
- Area code: 859
- FIPS code: 21-71976
- GNIS feature ID: 2405497
- Website: southgateky.org

Southgate is a home rule-class city in Campbell County, Kentucky, United States. The population was 3,648 at the 2020 census.

== History ==
The city of Southgate is named for the family of Richard Southgate. Born in New York City, Richard Southgate went to Newport from Richmond, Virginia in 1795. In October 1797, he was licensed to practice law in the court of Kentucky and appointed Commonwealth Attorney for Campbell County in 1798. He was State Representative in 1803 and Senator from 1817 to 1821. Richard died in July 1857 at the age of 83. Richard's home still stands on Third Street in Newport. His son William was a congressman from Northern Kentucky.

On May 28, 1977, the Beverly Hills Supper Club in Southgate was engulfed in fire, killing 165 inside.

== Geography ==
According to the United States Census Bureau, the city has a total area of 1.4 square miles (3.6 km^{2}), all land.

== Demographics ==
Historical population
Census	Pop.	Note	%±
1910	627		—
1920	699		11.5%
1930	1,735		148.2%
1940	1,841		6.1%
1950	1,903		3.4%
1960	2,070		8.8%
1970	3,212		55.2%
1980	2,833		−11.8%
1990	3,266		15.3%
2000	3,472		6.3%
2010	3,803		9.5%
2020	3,648		−4.1%
2024 (est.)	3,802		4.2%
U.S. Decennial Census

=== 2020 census ===
As of the 2020 census, Southgate had a population of 3,648. The median age was 35.9 years. 18.9% of residents were under the age of 18 and 15.1% of residents were 65 years of age or older. For every 100 females there were 91.7 males, and for every 100 females age 18 and over there were 86.3 males age 18 and over.

100.0% of residents lived in urban areas, while 0.0% lived in rural areas.

There were 1,789 households in Southgate, of which 22.8% had children under the age of 18 living in them. Of all households, 30.6% were married-couple households, 24.0% were households with a male householder and no spouse or partner present, and 36.2% were households with a female householder and no spouse or partner present. About 38.7% of all households were made up of individuals and 11.9% had someone living alone who was 65 years of age or older.

There were 1,877 housing units, of which 4.7% were vacant. The homeowner vacancy rate was 0.2% and the rental vacancy rate was 5.8%.

Racial composition as of the 2020 census
Race	Number	Percent
White	3,044	83.4%
Black or African American	275	7.5%
American Indian and Alaska Native	10	0.3%
Asian	41	1.1%
Native Hawaiian and Other Pacific Islander	2	0.1%
Some other race	39	1.1%
Two or more races	237	6.5%
Hispanic or Latino (of any race)	87	2.4%

=== 2000 census ===
At the 2000 census, there were 3,472 people, 1,601 households and 944 families residing in the city. The population density was 2,439.1 inhabitants per square mile (941.7/km^{2}). There were 1,665 housing units at an average density of 1,169.6 per square mile (451.6/km^{2}). The racial makeup of the city was 95.85% White, 0.72% African American, 0.26% Native American, 1.53% Asian, 0.69% from other races, and 0.95% from two or more races. Hispanic or Latino of any race were 1.24% of the population.

There were 1,601 households, of which 26.0% had children under the age of 18 living with them, 44.3% were married couples living together, 11.6% had a female householder with no husband present, and 41.0% were non-families. 35.7% of all households were made up of individuals, and 12.5% had someone living alone who was 65 years of age or older. The average household size was 2.17 and the average family size was 2.82.

21.7% of the population were under the age of 18, 8.0% from 18 to 24, 35.0% from 25 to 44, 20.7% from 45 to 64, and 14.7% who were 65 years of age or older. The median age was 36 years. For every 100 females, there were 87.0 males. For every 100 females age 18 and over, there were 80.8 males.

The median household income was $42,257 and the median family income was $53,365. Males had a median income of $37,846 compared with $27,634 for females. The per capita income for the city was $24,188. About 1.5% of families and 3.8% of the population were below the poverty line, including 4.6% of those under age 18 and 5.4% of those age 65 or over.

== Notable people ==
- Jim Bunning – U.S. Senator from Kentucky and Baseball Hall of Fame inductee
- Taylen Kinney "TK" aka Mr. 67 - a basketball player for Rod Wave Elite of the Overtime Elite basketball league

== Media portrayals ==
- Part of the film Rain Man was filmed at Evergreen Cemetery in Southgate.
