= 2024 United States House of Representatives elections in Kentucky =

- November 5, 2024

All 6 Kentucky seats to the United States House of Representatives
	Majority party	Minority party
Party	Republican	Democratic
Seats before	5	1
Seats won	5	1
Seat change	Steady	Steady
Popular vote	1,392,354	511,998
Percentage	73.07%	26.87%
Swing	▲7.93%	▼6.68%

Republican
50–60%
60–70%
70–80%
80–90%
>90%
Democratic
50–60%
60–70%

The 2024 United States House of Representatives elections in Kentucky were held on November 5, 2024, to elect the six U.S. representatives from the state of Kentucky, one from each of the state's congressional districts. The elections coincided with the U.S. presidential election, as well as other elections to the House of Representatives, elections to the United States Senate, and various state and local elections. The primary elections took place on May 21, 2024.

== Background ==
The Kentucky Supreme Court heard arguments in September 2023 in a suit alleging that the state legislature violated the state constitution by creating a partisan gerrymander in the state's congressional map by moving the state capital Frankfort to the heavily Republican 1st district. On December 14, 2023, the court affirmed a lower court ruling resulting in the case being dismissed.

== Overview ==
=== Statewide ===
Party	Candi- dates	Votes		Seats		
Party	Candi- dates	No.	%	No.	+/–	%
Republican Party	6	1,392,354	73.07%	5	Steady	83%
Democratic Party	4	511,998	26.87%	1	Steady	17%
Write-ins	–	1,182	0.06%	0	Steady	0%
Total	10	1,905,534	100%	6	Steady	100%

Popular vote
Republican	73.07%
Democratic	26.87%
Other	0.06%

House seats
Republican	83.33%
Democratic	16.67%

=== District ===
District	Republican		Democratic		Others		Total		Result
District	Votes	%	Votes	%	Votes	%	Votes	%	Result
District 1	252,729	74.72%	85,524	25.28%	0	0.00%	338,253	100.0%	Republican hold
District 2	252,826	73.10%	93,029	26.90%	0	0.00%	345,855	100.0%	Republican hold
District 3	124,713	38.04%	203,100	61.95%	51	0.02%	327,864	100.0%	Democratic hold
District 4	278,386	99.60%	0	0.00%	1,131	0.40%	279,517	100.0%	Republican hold
District 5	261,407	100.00%	0	0.00%	0	0.00%	261,407	100.0%	Republican hold
District 6	222,293	63.04%	130,345	36.96%	0	0.00%	352,638	100.0%	Republican hold
Total	1,392,354	73.07%	511,998	26.87%	1,182	0.06%	1,905,534	100.0%	

== District 1 ==
2024 Kentucky's 1st congressional district election
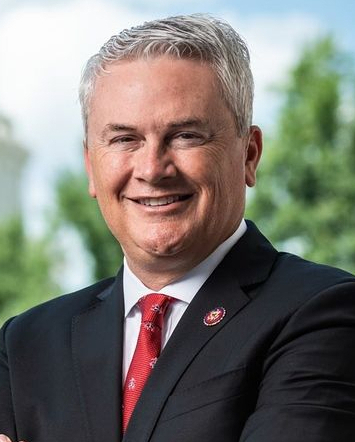

Nominee	James Comer	Erin Marshall
Party	Republican	Democratic
Popular vote	252,729	85,524
Percentage	74.7%	25.3%
- Comer: 50–60% 60–70% 70–80% 80–90% >90% Marshall: 50–60% 60–70% 70–80% 80–90% No votes
U.S. Representative before election
James Comer
Republican
Elected U.S. Representative
James Comer
Republican

The 1st district is based in Western Kentucky and stretches into Central Kentucky, taking in Henderson, Hopkinsville, Madisonville, Paducah, Murray, and Frankfort. The incumbent was Republican James Comer, who was re-elected with 74.9% of the vote in 2022.

=== Republican primary ===
==== Nominee ====
- James Comer, incumbent U.S. representative

==== Endorsements ====
James Comer

Organizations

- AIPAC
- National Rifle Association Political Victory Fund

==== Fundraising ====
Campaign finance reports as of May 1, 2024
Candidate	Raised	Spent	Cash on hand
James Comer (R)	$5,496,972	$3,635,885	$2,938,909
Source: Federal Election Commission

=== Democratic primary ===
==== Nominee ====
- Erin Marshall, sales manager

==== Endorsements ====
Erin Marshall

Organizations

- Vote Mama

Labor unions

- Kentucky AFL-CIO

==== Fundraising ====
Campaign finance reports as of May 1, 2024
Candidate	Raised	Spent	Cash on hand
Erin Marshall (D)	$75,751	$56,959	$18,791
Source: Federal Election Commission

=== General election ===
==== Predictions ====
Source	Ranking	As of
Cook Political Report	Solid R	December 30, 2023
Inside Elections	Solid R	January 3, 2024
Sabato's Crystal Ball	Safe R	November 16, 2023
Elections Daily	Safe R	October 26, 2023
CNalysis	Solid R	December 28, 2023
Decision Desk HQ	Solid R	June 1, 2024

==== Results ====
Kentucky's 1st congressional district, 2024
Party	Candidate	Votes	%
Republican	James Comer (incumbent)	252,729	74.7
Democratic	Erin Marshall	85,524	25.3
Total votes		338,253	100.0
Republican hold			

== District 2 ==
2024 Kentucky's 2nd congressional district election
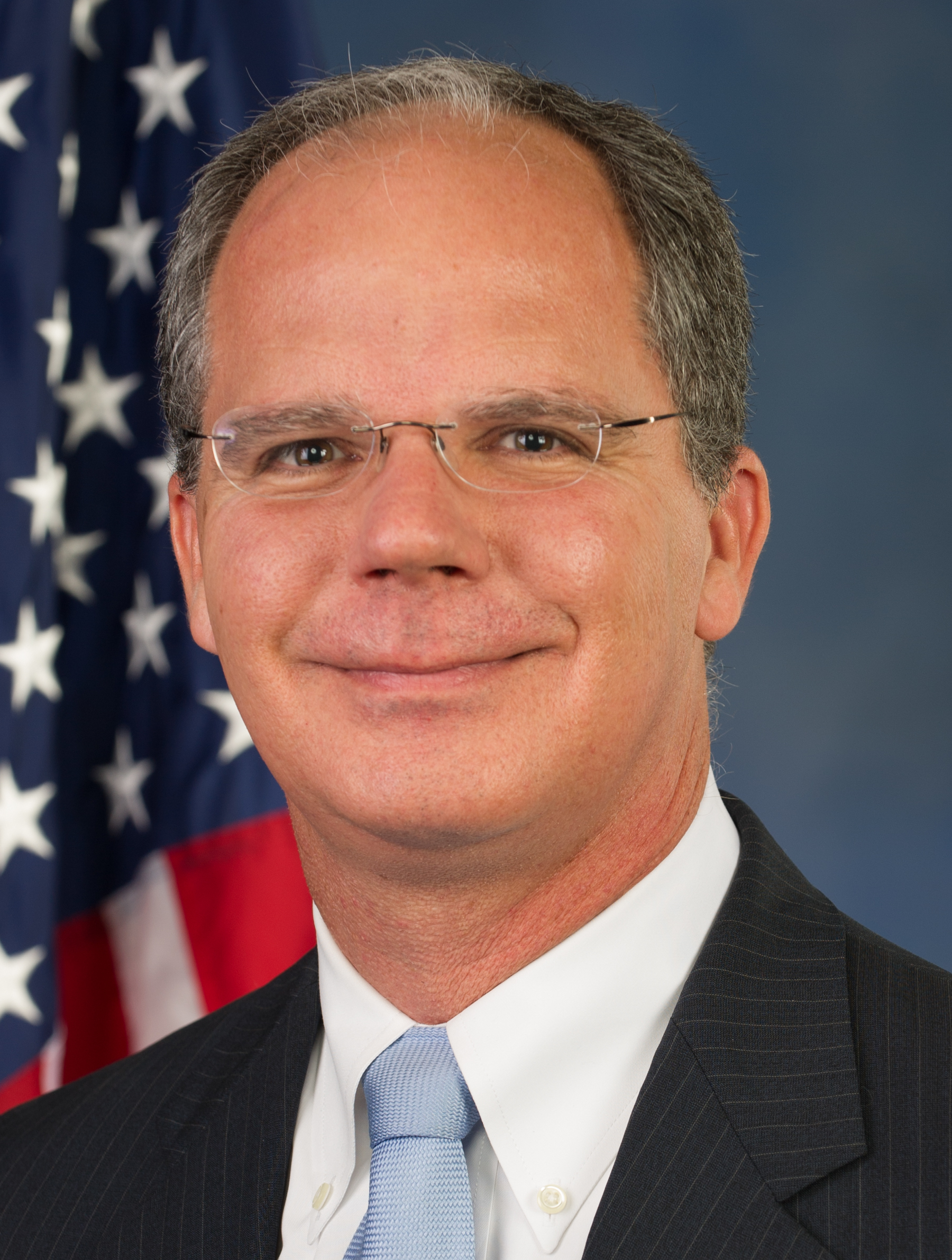

Nominee	Brett Guthrie	Hank Linderman
Party	Republican	Democratic
Popular vote	252,826	93,029
Percentage	73.1%	26.9%
- Guthrie: 50–60% 60–70% 70–80% 80–90% >90% Linderman: 50–60% 60–70% 70–80% Tie: 50% No votes
U.S. Representative before election
Brett Guthrie
Republican
Elected U.S. Representative
Brett Guthrie
Republican

The 2nd district is located in west central Kentucky, and includes Bowling Green, Owensboro, Elizabethtown, and a portion of eastern Louisville. The incumbent was Republican Brett Guthrie, who was re-elected with 71.9% of the vote in 2022.

=== Republican primary ===
==== Nominee ====
- Brett Guthrie, incumbent U.S. representative

==== Endorsements ====
Brett Guthrie

Organizations

- AIPAC
- National Rifle Association Political Victory Fund

==== Fundraising ====
Campaign finance reports as of May 1, 2024
Candidate	Raised	Spent	Cash on hand
Brett Guthrie (R)	$1,759,114	$1,977,765	$1,645,468
Source: Federal Election Commission

=== Democratic primary ===
==== Nominee ====
- Hank Linderman, musician, perennial candidate, and nominee for this district in 2018, 2020, and 2022

==== Eliminated in primary ====
- William Compton, Plum Springs city commissioner and candidate for this district in 2022

==== Endorsements ====
William Compton

Organizations

- Vote Common Good
Hank Linderman

Labor unions

- United Auto Workers

==== Fundraising ====
Campaign finance reports as of May 1, 2024
Candidate	Raised	Spent	Cash on hand
William Compton (D)	$4,569	$5,065	$248
Hank Linderman (D)	$7,100	$16,533	$9,303
Source: Federal Election Commission

==== Results ====
Democratic primary results
Party	Candidate	Votes	%
Democratic	Hank Linderman	12,515	57.3
Democratic	William Compton	9,313	42.7
Total votes		21,828	100.0

=== General election ===
==== Predictions ====
Source	Ranking	As of
Cook Political Report	Solid R	December 30, 2023
Inside Elections	Solid R	January 3, 2024
Sabato's Crystal Ball	Safe R	November 16, 2023
Elections Daily	Safe R	October 26, 2023
CNalysis	Solid R	December 28, 2023
Decision Desk HQ	Solid R	June 1, 2024

==== Results ====
Kentucky's 2nd congressional district, 2024
Party	Candidate	Votes	%
Republican	Brett Guthrie (incumbent)	252,826	73.1
Democratic	Hank Linderman	93,029	26.9
Total votes		345,855	100.0
Republican hold			

== District 3 ==
2024 Kentucky's 3rd congressional district election
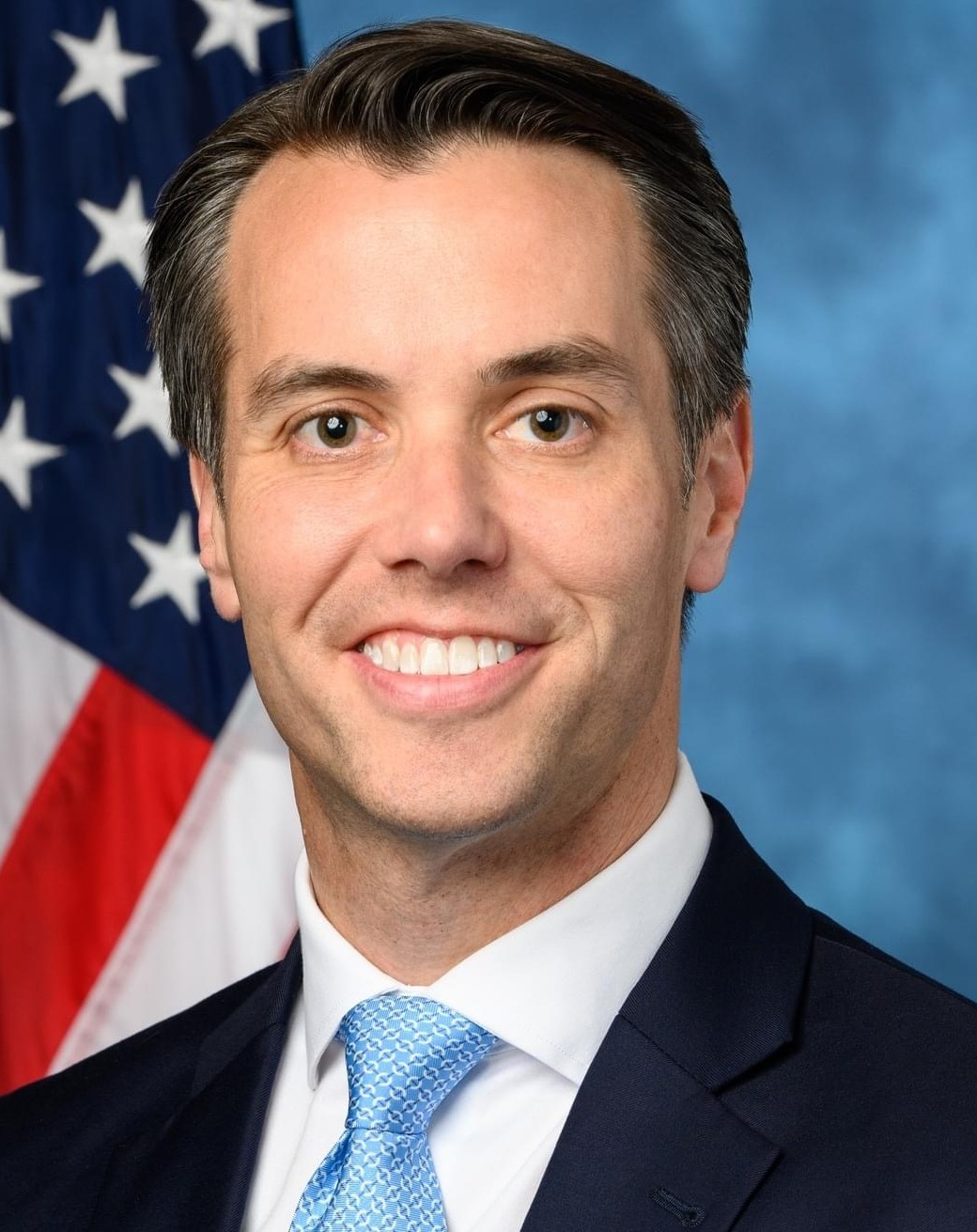

Nominee	Morgan McGarvey	Mike Craven
Party	Democratic	Republican
Popular vote	203,100	124,713
Percentage	61.9%	38.0%
- McGarvey: 50–60% 60–70% 70–80% 80–90% >90% Craven: 50–60% 60–70% 70–80% 80–90% >90% Tie: 50% No votes
U.S. Representative before election
Morgan McGarvey
Democratic
Elected U.S. Representative
Morgan McGarvey
Democratic

The 3rd district encompasses nearly all of Louisville Metro, which, since the merger of 2003, is consolidated with Jefferson County, though other incorporated cities, such as Shively and St. Matthews, exist within the county. The incumbent was Democrat Morgan McGarvey, who was elected with 62.0% of the vote in 2022.

=== Democratic primary ===
==== Nominee ====
- Morgan McGarvey, incumbent U.S. representative

==== Eliminated in primary ====
- Jared Randall, high school track coach
- Geoff Young, retired state employee and perennial candidate

==== Endorsements ====
Morgan McGarvey

Organizations

- AIPAC
- BIPAC
- Humane Society Legislative Fund
- Planned Parenthood Action Fund

Labor unions

- Kentucky AFL-CIO
- United Auto Workers

==== Fundraising ====
Campaign finance reports as of December 31, 2023
Candidate	Raised	Spent	Cash on hand
Morgan McGarvey (D)	$1,416,913	$671,715	$966,254
Geoff Young (D)	$13,410 (Note: $11,49 of this total was self-funded by Young.)	$13,511	$0
Source: Federal Election Commission

==== Results ====
Democratic primary results
Party	Candidate	Votes	%
Democratic	Morgan McGarvey (incumbent)	44,275	84.1
Democratic	Geoff Young	5,875	11.2
Democratic	Jared Randall	2,491	4.7
Total votes		52,641	100.0

=== Republican primary ===
==== Nominee ====
- Mike Craven, retired auto worker and perennial candidate

==== Eliminated in primary ====
- Dennis Ormerod, candidate for governor in 2023

==== Results ====
Republican primary results
Party	Candidate	Votes	%
Republican	Mike Craven	15,397	75.2
Republican	Dennis Ormerod	5,074	24.8
Total votes		20,471	100.0

=== General election ===
==== Predictions ====
Source	Ranking	As of
Cook Political Report	Solid D	December 30, 2023
Inside Elections	Solid D	January 3, 2024
Sabato's Crystal Ball	Safe D	November 16, 2023
Elections Daily	Safe D	October 26, 2023
CNalysis	Solid D	December 28, 2023
Decision Desk HQ	Solid D	June 1, 2024

==== Results ====
Kentucky's 3rd congressional district, 2024
Party	Candidate	Votes	%
Democratic	Morgan McGarvey (incumbent)	203,100	61.9
Republican	Mike Craven	124,713	38.0
Write-in		51	0.0
Total votes		327,864	100.0
Democratic hold			

== District 4 ==
2024 Kentucky's 4th congressional district election
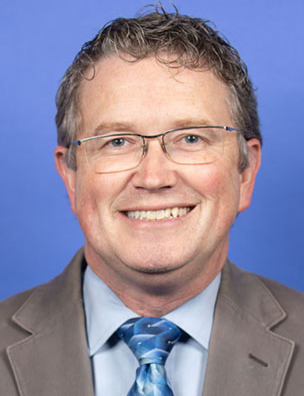

Nominee	Thomas Massie	Write-Ins
Party	Republican	N/A
Popular vote	278,386	1,131
Percentage	99.6%	0.4%
- County results Massie: 100–100%
U.S. Representative before election
Thomas Massie
Republican
Elected U.S. Representative
Thomas Massie
Republican

The 4th district is located in the northeastern part of the state along the Ohio River, including the suburbs of Cincinnati and the eastern suburbs of Louisville. The incumbent was Republican Thomas Massie, who was re-elected with 65.0% of the vote in 2022.

=== Republican primary ===
==== Nominee ====
- Thomas Massie, incumbent U.S. representative

==== Eliminated in primary ====
- Eric Deters, suspended attorney and candidate for governor in 2023
- Michael McGinnis, marketer

==== Endorsements ====
Eric Deters

Executive branch officials

- Michael Flynn, U.S. National Security Advisor (2017)
Thomas Massie

Individuals

- Nicole Shanahan, attorney and 2024 vice-presidential nominee for Robert F. Kennedy Jr. (Independent)

Organizations

- National Rifle Association Political Victory Fund
- National Right to Life Committee

==== Polling ====
Poll source	Date(s) administered	Sample size (Note: Key: A – all adults RV – registered voters LV – likely voters V – unclear)	Margin of error	Eric Deters	Thomas Massie	Michael McGinnis	Undecided
UpONE (R) (Note: This poll was sponsored by Massie's campaign)	March 2–4, 2024	473 (LV)	± 5.7%	12%	70%	4%	13%

==== Fundraising ====
Campaign finance reports as of May 1, 2024
Candidate	Raised	Spent	Cash on hand
Thomas Massie (R)	$802,152	$356,870	$693,373
Source: Federal Election Commission

==== Results ====
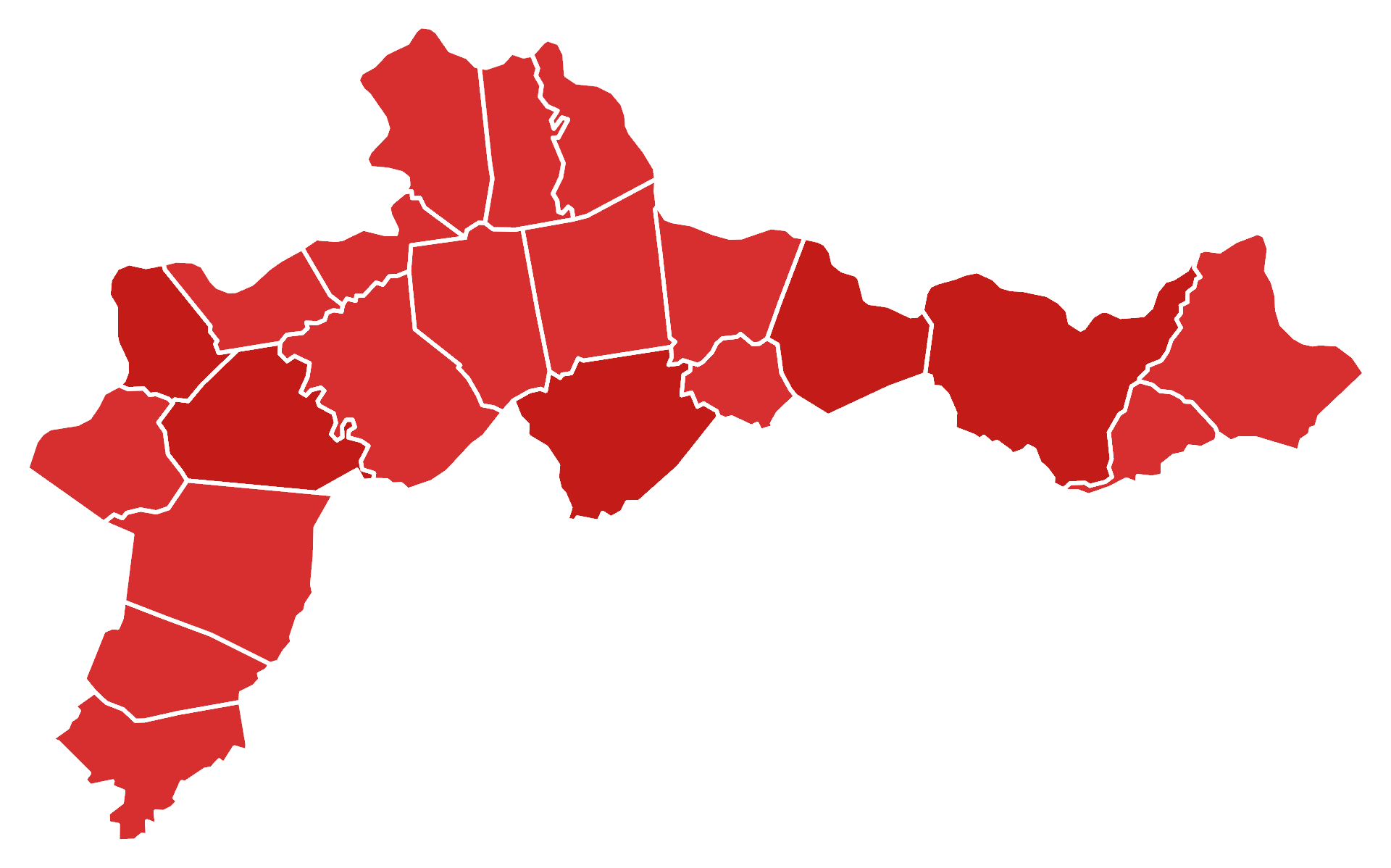
Primary results by county Massie- 70–80% Massie- 80–90%

Republican primary results
Party	Candidate	Votes	%
Republican	Thomas Massie (incumbent)	39,929	75.9
Republican	Michael McGinnis	6,604	12.6
Republican	Eric Deters	6,060	11.5
Total votes		52,593	100.0

=== General election ===
==== Predictions ====
Source	Ranking	As of
Cook Political Report	Solid R	December 30, 2023
Inside Elections	Solid R	January 3, 2024
Sabato's Crystal Ball	Safe R	November 16, 2023
Elections Daily	Safe R	October 26, 2023
CNalysis	Solid R	December 28, 2023
Decision Desk HQ	Solid R	June 1, 2024

==== Results ====
Kentucky's 4th congressional district, 2024
Party	Candidate	Votes	%
Republican	Thomas Massie (incumbent)	278,386	99.6
Write-in		1,131	0.4
Total votes		279,517	100.0
Republican hold			

== District 5 ==
2024 Kentucky's 5th congressional district election
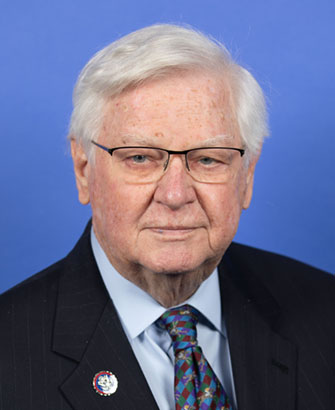
Nominee	Hal Rogers
Party	Republican
Popular vote	261,407
Percentage	100.0%
- County results Rogers: 100%
U.S. Representative before election
Hal Rogers
Republican
Elected U.S. Representative
Hal Rogers
Republican

The 5th district is based in the coalfields of eastern Kentucky. The incumbent was Republican House dean Hal Rogers, who was re-elected with 82.2% of the vote in 2022.

=== Republican primary ===
==== Nominee ====
- Hal Rogers, incumbent U.S. representative

==== Eliminated in primary ====
- Dana Edwards, surgeon
- David Kraftchak, airline pilot
- Brandon Monhollen, transportation manager and candidate for this district in 2022

==== Endorsements ====
Hal Rogers

Organizations

- AIPAC
- National Rifle Association Political Victory Fund

==== Fundraising ====
Campaign finance reports as of May 1, 2024
Candidate	Raised	Spent	Cash on hand
Hal Rogers (R)	$638,917	$354,408	$997,474
Dana Edwards (R)	$308,734 (Note: $260,000 of this total was self-funded by Edwards)	$311,137	$97
Source: Federal Election Commission

==== Results ====
Primary results by county: Rogers: 60–70%; 70–80%; 80–90%; >90%

Republican primary results
Party	Candidate	Votes	%
Republican	Hal Rogers (incumbent)	39,423	81.8
Republican	Dana Edwards	5,112	10.6
Republican	Brandon Monhollen	2,673	5.5
Republican	David Kraftchak	997	2.1
Total votes		48,205	100.0

=== General election ===
==== Predictions ====
Source	Ranking	As of
Cook Political Report	Solid R	December 30, 2023
Inside Elections	Solid R	January 3, 2024
Sabato's Crystal Ball	Safe R	November 16, 2023
Elections Daily	Safe R	October 26, 2023
CNalysis	Solid R	December 28, 2023
Decision Desk HQ	Solid R	June 1, 2024

==== Results ====
Kentucky's 5th congressional district, 2024
Party	Candidate	Votes	%
Republican	Hal Rogers (incumbent)	261,407	100.0
Total votes		261,407	100.0
Republican hold			

== District 6 ==
2024 Kentucky's 6th congressional district election
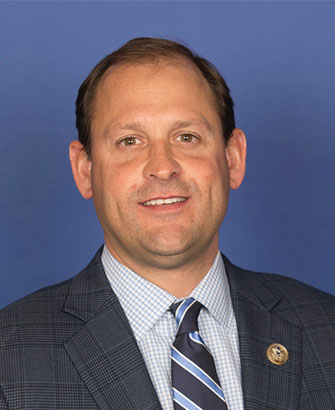

Nominee	Andy Barr	Randy Cravens
Party	Republican	Democratic
Popular vote	222,293	130,345
Percentage	63.0%	37.0%
- Barr: 50–60% 60–70% 70–80% 80–90% >90% Cravens: 50–60% 60–70% 70–80% 80–90% Tie: 50% No votes
U.S. Representative before election
Andy Barr
Republican
Elected U.S. Representative
Andy Barr
Republican

The 6th district is located in central Kentucky, taking in Lexington, Richmond, and Georgetown. The incumbent was Republican Andy Barr, who was re-elected with 62.7% of the vote in 2022.

=== Republican primary ===
==== Nominee ====
- Andy Barr, incumbent U.S. representative

==== Endorsements ====
Andy Barr

Organizations

- AIPAC
- Pro-Israel America
- National Rifle Association Political Victory Fund

=== Fundraising ===
Campaign finance reports as of May 1, 2024
Candidate	Raised	Spent	Cash on hand
Andy Barr (R)	$2,871,024	$1,104,696	$3,807,100
Source: Federal Election Commission

=== Democratic primary ===
==== Nominee ====
- Randy Cravens, IT major incident manager and write-in candidate for this district in 2022

==== Eliminated in primary ====
- Todd Kelly, tree nursery owner
- Don B. Pratt, retired grocery store owner and perennial candidate
- Jonathan Richardson, nonprofit founder
- Shauna Rudd, social worker

==== Endorsements ====
Randy Cravens

Newspapers

- Lexington Herald-Leader (Democratic primary only)

==== Fundraising ====
Campaign finance reports as of May 1, 2024
Candidate	Raised	Spent	Cash on hand
Randy Cravens (D)	$2,305	$4,397	$1,079
Todd Kelly (D)	$45,203 (Note: $5,500 of this total was self-funded by Kelly.)	$34,168	$13,035
Shauna Rudd (D)	$53,774	$54,262	$212
Source: Federal Election Commission

==== Results ====
Democratic primary results
Party	Candidate	Votes	%
Democratic	Randy Cravens	9,305	26.0
Democratic	Todd Kelly	9,104	25.4
Democratic	Shauna Rudd	8,627	24.1
Democratic	Jonathan Richardson	4,433	12.4
Democratic	Don B. Pratt	4,335	12.1
Total votes		35,804	100.0

=== General election ===
==== Predictions ====
Source	Ranking	As of
Cook Political Report	Solid R	December 30, 2023
Inside Elections	Solid R	January 3, 2024
Sabato's Crystal Ball	Safe R	November 16, 2023
Elections Daily	Safe R	October 26, 2023
CNalysis	Solid R	December 28, 2023
Decision Desk HQ	Solid R	June 1, 2024

==== Results ====
Kentucky's 6th congressional district, 2024
Party	Candidate	Votes	%
Republican	Andy Barr (incumbent)	222,293	63.0
Democratic	Randy Cravens	130,345	37.0
Total votes		352,638	100.0
Republican hold			

== Notes ==
Partisan clients
