= AIPAC Act =

2026 proposed American Act of Congress

Americans Insist on Political Agent Clarity Act
- Long title: To amend the Foreign Agents Registration Act of 1938, as amended to clarify the definition of “foreign principal” and ensure transparency in lobbying on behalf of foreign interests.

Legislative history
- Introduced in the House of Representatives by Thomas Massie on May 14, 2026; Committee consideration by United States House Committee on the Judiciary

The Americans Insist on Political Agent Clarity Act, commonly known as the AIPAC Act, is a proposed 2026 Act of Congress to amend the Foreign Agents Registration Act (FARA). It is named for the American Israel Public Affairs Committee (AIPAC), which would be required to register as a foreign agent under the act.

== Background ==
AIPAC is an American pro-Israel lobbying organization, based in Washington, D.C. As the organization is run by Americans, it is not required to register as a foreign agent under FARA.

== Legislative history ==
The act was introduced by Representative Thomas Massie on May 14, 2026. In a press release announcing the bill, he wrote, "Americans have a right to know when powerful lobbying organizations are advancing the interests of foreign governments in Congress."

The introduction occurred several days before Massie lost his primary for Kentucky's 4th district in the US House of Representatives to Ed Gallrein. AIPAC's super political action group, along with pro-Israel groups United Democracy Project and Republican Jewish Coalition Victory Fund had collectively spent over $15.8 million either opposing Massie or supporting his opponent in the primary.

== Reaction ==
=== Opposition ===
In an opinion published in The Times of Israel, Sherwin Pomerantz wrote that politicians like Massie, who had introduced the AIPAC act, "seem to look the other way when the money and influence is coming from Israel’s Gulf neighbors," including entities based in Qatar.
