= Kentucky's congressional districts =

Congressional districts of Kentucky

Map of Kentucky's congressional districts since 2023 Interactive map version

Kentucky is currently divided into six congressional districts, each represented by a member of the United States House of Representatives. The number of congressional districts has been set at six since the 1990 redistricting cycle.

== Current districts and representatives ==
This is a list of members of the current Kentuckian House delegation, their terms, their district boundaries, and the district political ratings according to the Cook Partisan Voting Index (CPVI). The delegation has a total of six members, including five Republicans and one Democrat.

In 2023, Kentucky's Supreme Court upheld Republican-drawn boundaries for the state's congressional districts, finding that while the map represented a partisan gerrymander by the Republican-controlled legislature, the state's constitution does not "explicitly forbid"’ the advancement of partisan interests through redistricting.

Current U.S. representatives from Kentucky
District	Member (Residence)	Party	Incumbent since	CPVI (2025)	District map
1st	James Comer (Tompkinsville)	Republican	November 8, 2016	R+23	
2nd	Brett Guthrie (Bowling Green)	Republican	January 3, 2009	R+20	
3rd	Morgan McGarvey (Louisville)	Democratic	January 3, 2023	D+10	
4th	Thomas Massie (Garrison)	Republican	November 13, 2012	R+18	
5th	Hal Rogers (Somerset)	Republican	January 3, 1981	R+32	
6th	Andy Barr (Lexington)	Republican	January 3, 2013	R+7	

== Historical and present district boundaries ==
Table of United States congressional district boundary maps in the State of Kentucky, presented chronologically. All redistricting events that took place in Kentucky between 1973 and 2013 are shown.

Year	Statewide map	Louisville highlight
1973–1982		
1983–1992		
1993–1996		
1997–2002		
2003–2013		
2013–2023		

== Obsolete districts ==
The following are former districts of Kentucky:

- 7th district, obsolete since the 1990 census
- 8th district, obsolete since the 1960 census
- 9th district, obsolete since the 1950 census
- 10th district, obsolete since the 1930 census
- 11th district, obsolete since the 1930 census
- 12th district, obsolete since the 1840 census
- 13th district, obsolete since the 1840 census
- At-large district, obsolete since 1935

== See also ==
- List of United States congressional districts
