= 2020 United States House of Representatives elections in Kentucky =

- November 3, 2020

All 6 Kentucky seats to the United States House of Representatives
	Majority party	Minority party
Party	Republican	Democratic
Last election	5	1
Seats won	5	1
Seat change	Steady	Steady
Popular vote	1,363,964	735,419
Percentage	64.46%	34.76%
Swing	▲4.87%	▼4.29%

Republican
50–60%
60–70%
70–80%
80–90%
>90%
Democratic
50–60%
60–70%

The 2020 United States House of Representatives elections in Kentucky was held on November 3, 2020, to elect the six U.S. representatives from the state of Kentucky, one from each of the state's six congressional districts. The elections coincided with the 2020 U.S. presidential election, as well as other elections to the House of Representatives, elections to the United States Senate and various state and local elections.

== Overview ==
District	Republican		Democratic		Others		Total		Result
District	Votes	%	Votes	%	Votes	%	Votes	%	Result
District 1	246,329	74.99%	82,141	25.01%	0	0.00%	328,470	100.0%	Republican hold
District 2	255,735	70.96%	94,643	26.26%	10,021	2.78%	360,399	100.0%	Republican hold
District 3	136,425	37.16%	230,672	62.84%	0	0.00%	367,097	100.0%	Democratic hold
District 4	256,613	67.09%	125,896	32.91%	0	0.00%	382,509	100.0%	Republican hold
District 5	250,914	84.21%	47,056	15.79%	0	0.00%	297,970	100.0%	Republican hold
District 6	216,948	57.32%	155,011	40.96%	6,491	1.72%	378,450	100.0%	Republican hold
Total	1,363,964	64.46%	735,419	34.76%	16,512	0.78%	2,115,895	100.0%	

Popular vote
Republican	64.46%
Democratic	34.76%
Other	0.78%

House seats
Republican	83.33%
Democratic	16.67%

== District 1 ==
2020 Kentucky's 1st congressional district election
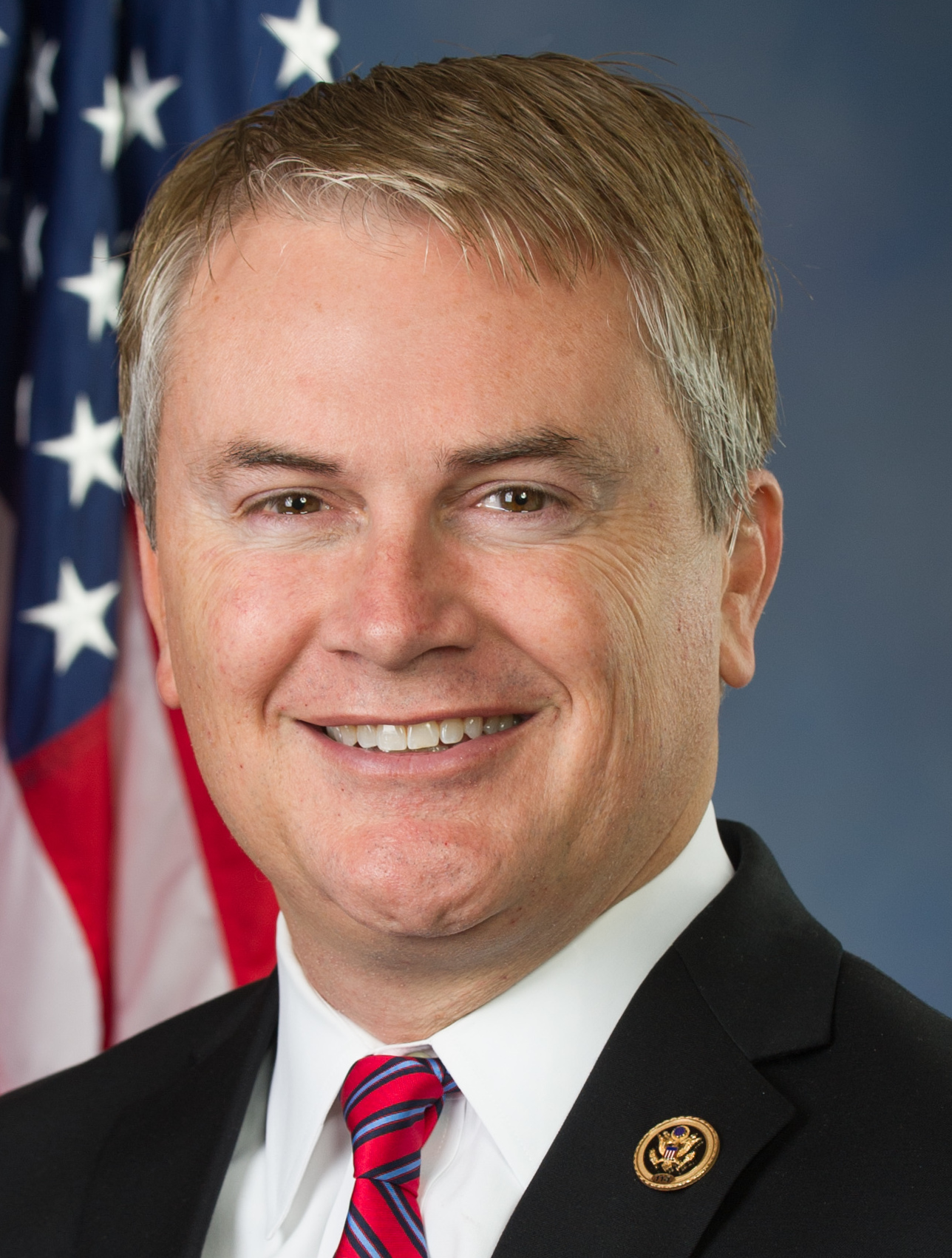

Nominee	James Comer	James Rhodes
Party	Republican	Democratic
Popular vote	246,329	82,141
Percentage	75.0%	25.0%
- County results Comer: 60–70% 70–80% 80–90% >90%
U.S. Representative before election
James Comer
Republican
Elected U.S. Representative
James Comer
Republican

The 1st district takes in Western Kentucky, including Paducah, Hopkinsville, Murray, and Henderson. The incumbent is Republican James Comer, who was re-elected with 68.6% of the vote.

=== Republican primary ===
==== Candidates ====
===== Declared =====
- James Comer, incumbent U.S. representative

=== Democratic primary ===
==== Candidates ====
===== Declared =====
- James Rhodes

=== General election ===
==== Predictions ====
Source	Ranking	As of
The Cook Political Report	Safe R	July 2, 2020
Inside Elections	Safe R	June 2, 2020
Sabato's Crystal Ball	Safe R	July 2, 2020
Politico	Safe R	April 19, 2020
Daily Kos	Safe R	June 3, 2020
RCP	Safe R	June 9, 2020
Niskanen	Safe R	June 7, 2020

==== Results ====
Kentucky's 1st congressional district, 2020
Party	Candidate	Votes	%
Republican	James Comer (incumbent)	246,329	75.0
Democratic	James Rhodes	82,141	25.0
Total votes		328,470	100.0
Republican hold			

== District 2 ==
2020 Kentucky's 2nd congressional district election
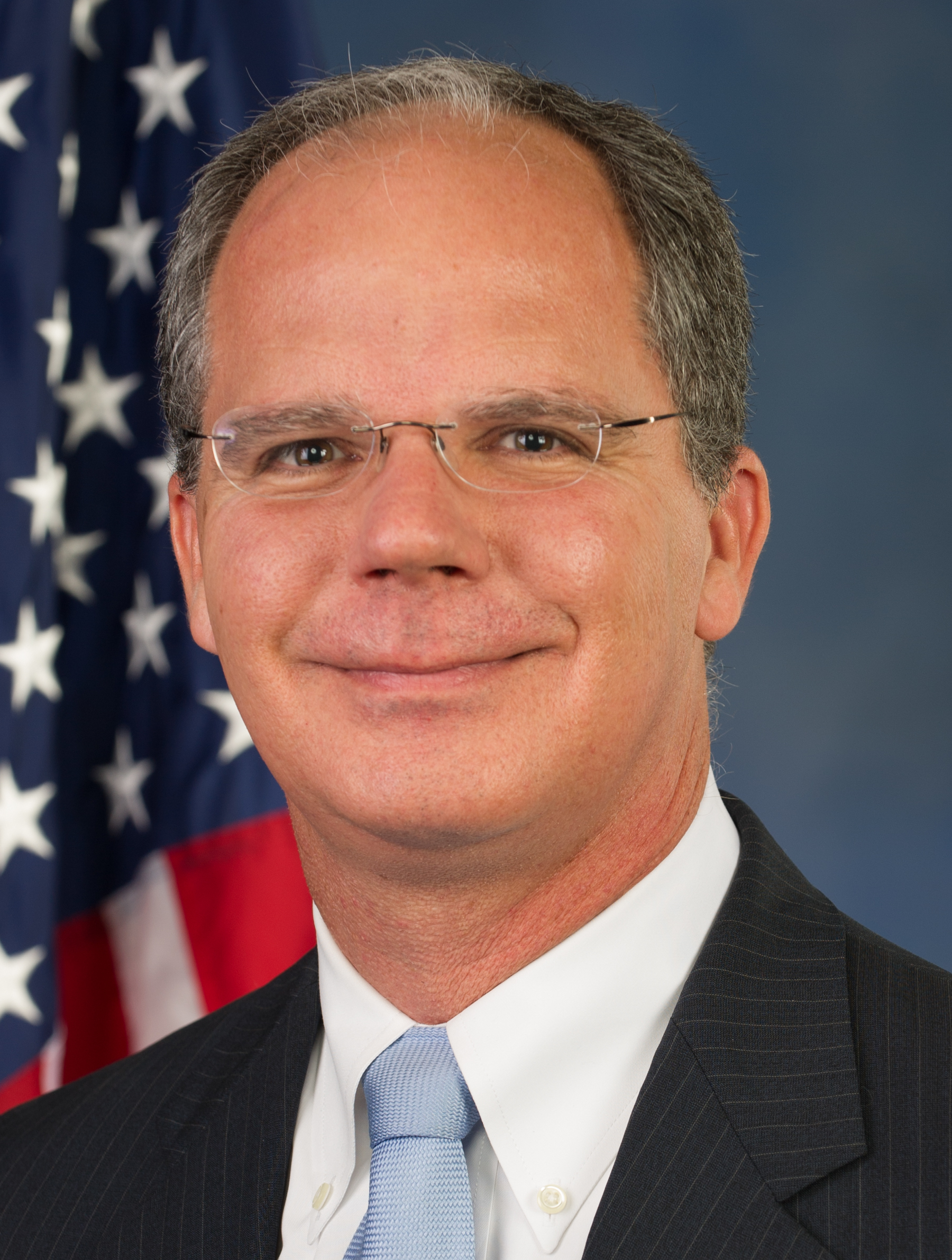

Nominee	Brett Guthrie	Hank Linderman
Party	Republican	Democratic
Popular vote	255,735	94,643
Percentage	70.9%	26.3%
- County results Guthrie: 60–70% 70–80% 80–90%
U.S. Representative before election
Brett Guthrie
Republican
Elected U.S. Representative
Brett Guthrie
Republican

The 2nd district encompasses west-central Kentucky, taking in Bowling Green, Owensboro, and Elizabethtown. The incumbent is Republican Brett Guthrie, who was re-elected with 66.7% of the vote in 2018.

=== Republican primary ===
==== Candidates ====
===== Declared =====
- Kathleen Free
- Brett Guthrie, incumbent U.S. representative

==== Primary results ====
Republican primary results
Party	Candidate	Votes	%
Republican	Brett Guthrie (incumbent)	65,313	88.6
Republican	Kathleen Free	8,380	11.4
Total votes		73,693	100.0

=== Democratic primary ===
==== Candidates ====
===== Declared =====
- Hank Linderman, nominee for Kentucky's 2nd congressional district in 2018

=== Third parties ===
==== Libertarian Party ====
- Robert Lee Perry

==== Populist Party ====
- Lewis Carter

=== General election ===
==== Predictions ====
Source	Ranking	As of
The Cook Political Report	Safe R	July 2, 2020
Inside Elections	Safe R	June 2, 2020
Sabato's Crystal Ball	Safe R	July 2, 2020
Politico	Safe R	April 19, 2020
Daily Kos	Safe R	June 3, 2020
RCP	Safe R	June 9, 2020
Niskanen	Safe R	June 7, 2020

==== Results ====
Kentucky's 2nd congressional district, 2020
Party	Candidate	Votes	%
Republican	Brett Guthrie (incumbent)	255,735	70.9
Democratic	Hank Linderman	94,643	26.3
Libertarian	Robert Lee Perry	7,588	2.1
Populist	Lewis Carter	2,431	0.7
Write-in		2	0.0
Total votes		360,399	100.0
Republican hold			

== District 3 ==
2020 Kentucky's 3rd congressional district election
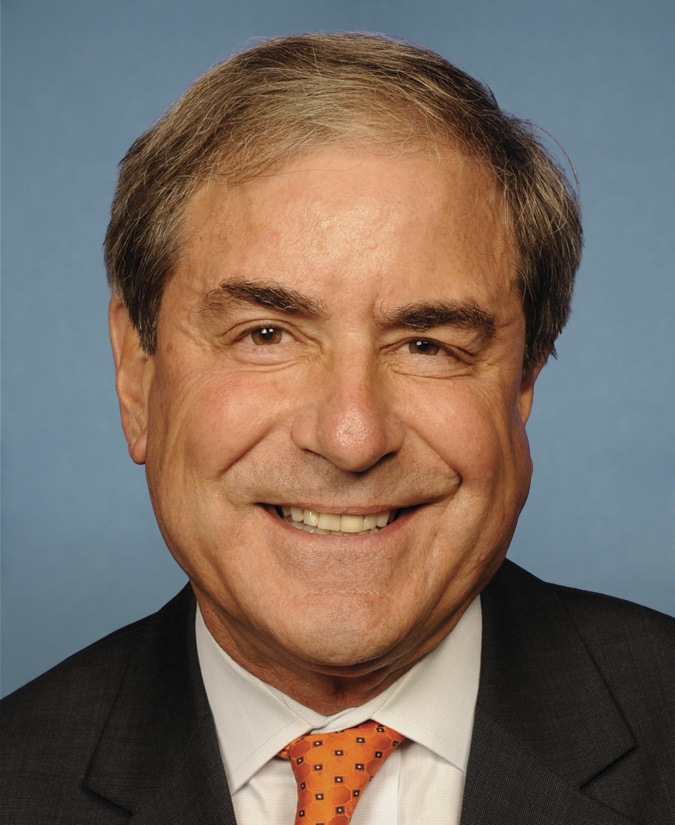

Nominee	John Yarmuth	Rhonda Palazzo
Party	Democratic	Republican
Popular vote	230,672	137,425
Percentage	62.7%	37.3%
- County result Yarmuth: 60–70%
U.S. Representative before election
John Yarmuth
Democratic
Elected U.S. Representative
John Yarmuth
Democratic

The 3rd district encompasses nearly all of the Louisville metropolitan area. The incumbent is Democrat John Yarmuth, who was re-elected with 62.1% of the vote in 2018.

=== Democratic primary ===
==== Candidates ====
===== Declared =====
- John Yarmuth, incumbent U.S. representative

=== Republican primary ===
==== Candidates ====
===== Declared =====
- Mike Craven, activist and candidate for Kentucky's 3rd congressional district in 2018
- Waymen Eddings, businessman
- Rhonda Palazzo, realtor and candidate for Kentucky's 3rd congressional district in 2018

==== Primary results ====
Republican primary results
Party	Candidate	Votes	%
Republican	Rhonda Palazzo	19,806	42.4
Republican	Mike Craven	19,676	42.1
Republican	Waymen Eddings	7,275	15.5
Total votes		46,757	100.0

=== General election ===
==== Predictions ====
Source	Ranking	As of
The Cook Political Report	Safe D	July 2, 2020
Inside Elections	Safe D	June 2, 2020
Sabato's Crystal Ball	Safe D	July 2, 2020
Politico	Safe D	April 19, 2020
Daily Kos	Safe D	June 3, 2020
RCP	Safe D	June 9, 2020
Niskanen	Safe D	June 7, 2020

==== Results ====
Kentucky's 3rd congressional district, 2020
Party	Candidate	Votes	%
Democratic	John Yarmuth (incumbent)	230,672	62.7
Republican	Rhonda Palazzo	137,425	37.3
Total votes		368,097	100.0
Democratic hold			

== District 4 ==
2020 Kentucky's 4th congressional district election
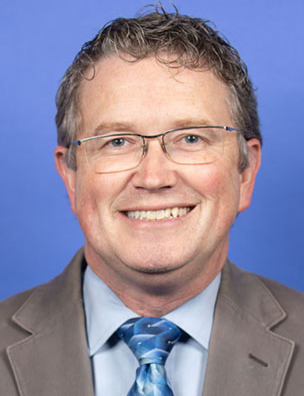

Nominee	Thomas Massie	Alexandra Owensby
Party	Republican	Democratic
Popular vote	256,613	125,896
Percentage	67.1%	32.9%
- County results Massie: 60–70% 70–80% 80–90%
U.S. Representative before election
Thomas Massie
Republican
Elected U.S. Representative
Thomas Massie
Republican

The 4th district is located in the northeastern part of the state along the Ohio River, including the suburbs of Cincinnati and a small part of Louisville. The incumbent is Republican Thomas Massie, who was re-elected with 62.2% of the vote in 2018.

=== Republican primary ===
==== Candidates ====
===== Declared =====
- Thomas Massie, incumbent U.S. representative
- Todd McMurtry, attorney

===== Declined =====
- Kim Moser, state representative

==== Endorsements ====
Thomas Massie (R)

US senators

- Rand Paul, U.S. senator from Kentucky

==== Polling ====
Poll source	Date(s) administered	Sample size (Note: Key: A – all adults RV – registered voters LV – likely voters V – unclear)	Margin of error	Thomas Massie	Todd McMurty	Kim Moser	Undecided
WPA Intelligence (Note: By the time of this poll's sampling period, the Club for Growth had endorsed Massie's re-election bid)	June 10–11, 2020	411 (LV)	± 4.9%	77%	11%	–	12%
WPA Intelligence	April 27–28, 2020	407 (LV)	± 4.9%	70%	13%	–	17%
Public Opinion Strategies (R) (Note: Poll sponsored by Massie)	February 4–6, 2020	300 (V)	± 5.66%	71%	3%	–	–
WPA Intelligence (Note: The Club for Growth is an organization that exclusively endorses Republican candidates)	July 8–9, 2019	400 (LV)	± 4.9%	64%	–	10%	26%

Hypothetical polling

with Generic Republican

Poll source	Date(s) administered	Sample size	Margin of error	Thomas Massie	Generic Republican	Undecided
WPA Intelligence	July 8–9, 2019	400 (LV)	± 4.9%	50%	8%	43% (Note: "Would consider another candidate besides Massie" with 36%; "don't know" with 7%)

==== Primary results ====
Republican primary results
Party	Candidate	Votes	%
Republican	Thomas Massie (incumbent)	68,591	81.0
Republican	Todd McMurtry	16,092	19.0
Total votes		84,683	100.0

=== Democratic primary ===
==== Candidates ====
===== Declared =====
- Shannon Fabert, business consultant
- Alexandra Owensby, nurse practitioner

==== Primary results ====
Democratic primary results
Party	Candidate	Votes	%
Democratic	Alexandra Owensby	41,531	58.4
Democratic	Shannon Fabert	29,557	41.6
Total votes		71,088	100.0

=== General election ===
==== Predictions ====
Source	Ranking	As of
The Cook Political Report	Safe R	July 2, 2020
Inside Elections	Safe R	June 2, 2020
Sabato's Crystal Ball	Safe R	July 2, 2020
Politico	Safe R	April 19, 2020
Daily Kos	Safe R	June 3, 2020
RCP	Safe R	June 9, 2020
Niskanen	Safe R	June 7, 2020

==== Results ====
Kentucky's 4th congressional district, 2020
Party	Candidate	Votes	%
Republican	Thomas Massie (incumbent)	256,613	67.1
Democratic	Alexandra Owensby	125,896	32.9
Total votes		382,509	100.0
Republican hold			

== District 5 ==
2020 Kentucky's 5th congressional district election
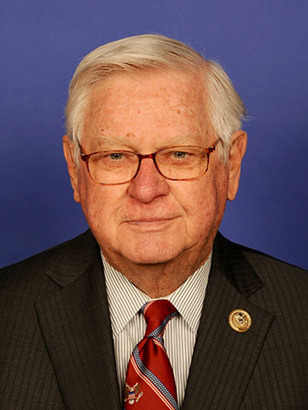

Nominee	Hal Rogers	Matthew Best
Party	Republican	Democratic
Popular vote	250,914	47,056
Percentage	84.2%	15.8%
- County results Rogers: 60–70% 70–80% 80–90% >90%
U.S. Representative before election
Hal Rogers
Republican
Elected U.S. Representative
Hal Rogers
Republican

The 5th district, one of the poorest and most rural in the country, is based in the coalfields of eastern Kentucky. The incumbent is Republican Hal Rogers, who was re-elected with 78.9% of the vote in 2018.

=== Republican primary ===
==== Candidates ====
===== Declared =====
- Hal Rogers, incumbent U.S. representative
- Geraldo Serrano, farmer and candidate for Kentucky's 5th congressional district in 2018

==== Primary results ====
Republican primary results
Party	Candidate	Votes	%
Republican	Hal Rogers (incumbent)	76,575	91.1
Republican	Gerardo Serrano	7,436	8.9
Total votes		84,011	100.0

=== Democratic primary ===
==== Candidates ====
===== Declared =====
- Matthew Best

===== Declined =====
- Rocky Adkins, minority leader of the Kentucky House of Representatives and candidate for Governor of Kentucky in 2019

=== General election ===
==== Predictions ====
Source	Ranking	As of
The Cook Political Report	Safe R	July 2, 2020
Inside Elections	Safe R	June 2, 2020
Sabato's Crystal Ball	Safe R	July 2, 2020
Politico	Safe R	April 19, 2020
Daily Kos	Safe R	June 3, 2020
RCP	Safe R	June 9, 2020
Niskanen	Safe R	June 7, 2020

==== Results ====
Kentucky's 5th congressional district, 2020
Party	Candidate	Votes	%
Republican	Hal Rogers (incumbent)	250,914	84.2
Democratic	Matthew Best	47,056	15.8
Total votes		297,970	100.0
Republican hold			

== District 6 ==
2020 Kentucky's 6th congressional district election
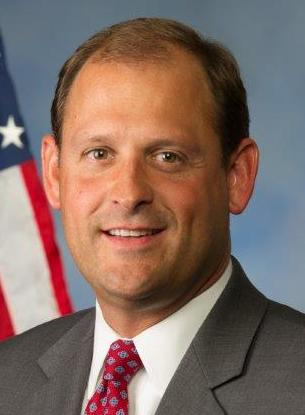

Nominee	Andy Barr	Josh Hicks
Party	Republican	Democratic
Popular vote	216,948	155,011
Percentage	57.3%	41.0%
- County results Barr: 50–60% 60–70% 70–80% Hicks: 50–60%
U.S. Representative before election
Andy Barr
Republican
Elected U.S. Representative
Andy Barr
Republican

The 6th district is located in central Kentucky, taking in Lexington, Richmond, and Frankfort. The incumbent is Republican Andy Barr, who was re-elected with 51.0% of the vote in 2018.

=== Republican primary ===
==== Candidates ====
===== Declared =====
- Andy Barr, incumbent U.S. representative
- Chuck Eddy, retired salesman
- Geoff Young, perennial candidate and assistant director

==== Primary results ====
Republican primary results
Party	Candidate	Votes	%
Republican	Andy Barr (incumbent)	62,706	90.7
Republican	Chuck Eddy	3,636	5.3
Republican	Geoff Young	2,765	4.0
Total votes		69,107	100.0

=== Democratic primary ===
==== Candidates ====
===== Declared =====
- Josh Hicks, attorney and U.S. Marine veteran
- Daniel Kemph, business analyst and candidate for Kentucky's 6th congressional district in 2018

==== Primary results ====
Democratic primary results
Party	Candidate	Votes	%
Democratic	Josh Hicks	81,305	72.4
Democratic	Daniel Kemph	31,064	27.6
Total votes		112,369	100.0

=== General election ===
==== Endorsements ====
Josh Hicks (D)
- Charles Booker, state representative and former candidate for U.S. Senate in 2020
- VoteVets

==== Predictions ====
Source	Ranking	As of
The Cook Political Report	Likely R	July 2, 2020
Inside Elections	Safe R	June 2, 2020
Sabato's Crystal Ball	Likely R	July 2, 2020
Politico	Likely R	April 19, 2020
Daily Kos	Likely R	June 3, 2020
RCP	Lean R	October 24, 2020
Niskanen	Lean R	June 7, 2020

==== Polling ====
Poll source	Date(s) administered	Sample size	Margin of error	Andy Barr (R)	Josh Hicks (D)	Frank Harris (L)	Undecided
Bluegrass Voters Coalition (D) (Note: This pollster supports candidates it considers politically progressive)	July 13, 2020	700 (LV)	± 5.0%	48%	50%	2%	11%

==== Results ====
Kentucky's 6th congressional district, 2020
Party	Candidate	Votes	%
Republican	Andy Barr (incumbent)	216,948	57.3
Democratic	Josh Hicks	155,011	41.0
Libertarian	Frank Harris	6,491	1.7
Total votes		378,450	100.0
Republican hold			

== See also ==
- 2020 Kentucky elections

== Notes ==
Partisan clients
