= Thomas Massie =

American politician (born 1971)

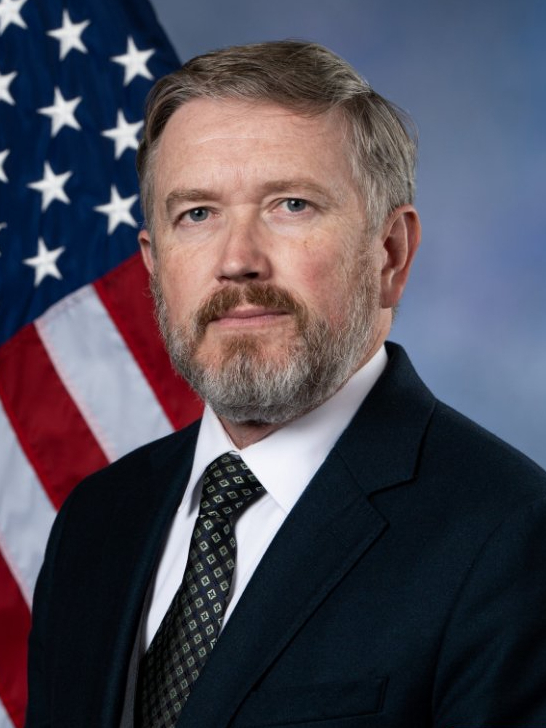
- Official portrait, 2025

Member of the U.S. House of Representatives from Kentucky's 4th district
- Incumbent
- Assumed office November 13, 2012
- Preceded by: Geoff Davis

Judge-Executive of Lewis County
- In office January 3, 2011 – June 30, 2012
- Preceded by: Steve Applegate
- Succeeded by: John Collins

Personal details
- Born: Thomas Harold Massie; January 13, 1971 (age 55) Huntington, West Virginia, US
- Party: Republican
- Spouses: Rhonda Howard (m. 1993; died 2024); Carolyn Moffa (m. 2025)
- Children: 4
- Education: Massachusetts Institute of Technology (BS, MS)
- Website: House website Campaign website
- Massie's voice Massie on the 59th anniversary of the USS Liberty incident Recorded June 8, 2026

Thomas Harold Massie (born January 13, 1971) is an American politician and engineer. A libertarian Republican, Massie has been the United States representative for Kentucky's 4th congressional district since 2012.

Raised in Vanceburg, Kentucky, Massie earned two degrees from the Massachusetts Institute of Technology, where he worked on computer simulation, including haptics and 3D human–computer interaction. He later founded a startup based on that work, returning to Kentucky after selling the company. In 2010, Massie was elected judge-executive of Lewis County.

A libertarian Republican, Massie was first elected to Congress in a 2012 special election with the backing of the Tea Party movement. His staunch opposition to increases in federal spending, reauthorization of warrantless surveillance and spying programs, and interventionism have earned him the nickname "Mr. No", echoing fellow libertarian Republican Ron Paul. During President Donald Trump's second administration, Massie drew national attention for his disputes with Trump and Republican leadership over the One Big Beautiful Bill Act and the Epstein Files Transparency Act. Massie also introduced an article of impeachment against Pete Hegseth, the Defence Secretary, for initiating and prolonging hostilities in Iran in excess of 90 days without congressional authorization, carrying out extrajudicial killings, and exhibiting disregard for civilian deaths in military operations authorized by him. He also introduced a bill that would have forced the pro-Israel AIPAC lobby group to register as a foreign agent under the Foreign Agents Registration Act.

Massie is amongst the few Republicans to have been an outspoken critic of Donald Trump and his administration, condemning his military aggression campaigns in Venezuela and Iran, and aid to Israel, the latter of which incurred him the enmity of pro-Israel interest groups in the US Congress. His scathing critique of Donald Trump's administration, including leading bipartisan efforts to force the release of Jeffrey Epstein files, has invited personal attacks from Trump.

He ran for re-election in 2026 in what was the most expensive U.S. House primary in history, characterized by pro-Israel groups spending over $9 million against Massie; Massie eventually lost the primary renomination to Ed Gallrein, the Trump-endorsed candidate, who refused to debate Massie, ignored requests for interviews, and maintained a relatively-obscure campaign. Massie stated during the primary election that it was a "referendum on whether Israel gets to buy seats in the Congress."

== Early life and education ==
Massie was born in Huntington, West Virginia. He was raised in an Appalachian American culture in Vanceburg, Kentucky. His father was a beer distributor. He met his first wife, Rhonda, at Lewis County High School in Vanceburg.

Massie earned a Bachelor of Science in electrical engineering in 1993 and a Master of Science in mechanical engineering in 1996 from the Massachusetts Institute of Technology. His master's thesis was titled, "Initial haptic explorations with the phantom: virtual touch through point interaction." His work at MIT focused on 3D human-computer interaction through the use of haptic-enabled input devices. In 1990, he participated in the MIT Solar Electric Vehicle Team, helping to build the team's car, Galaxy. He drove Galaxy in the 1990 GM Sunrayce, finishing at Churchill Downs after ten days, winning sixth place.

In 1992, Massie won MIT's then-named 2.70 ("Introduction to Design and Manufacturing", now named 2.007) Design Competition. MIT professor Woodie Flowers, who pioneered the 2.70 contest, mentioned that Massie watched this contest on television in seventh grade and wanted to come to MIT to win it. In 1993, Massie was initiated into Tau Beta Pi (the National Engineering Honor Society).

== Early career ==
In 1993, Massie and his wife founded a company, SensAble Devices Inc., that allowed users to feel digital objects that appeared on a screen, based on a technology he invented while in school. He completed his BSc the same year; his thesis was on the same topic, Design of a three-degree of freedom force-reflecting haptic interface. In 1995, Massie won the $30,000 Lemelson–MIT Student Prize for inventors and the $10,000 David and Lindsay Morgenthaler Grand Prize in the sixth annual MIT $10K Entrepreneurial Business Plan Competition. In 1996, his company was reincorporated as SensAble Technologies, Inc., after MIT's Bill Aulet joined him as a partner. He raised $32 million of venture capital, employed 70 people, and obtained 24 patents during his time at the company, which he sold in 2003.

== Lewis County Judge Executive ==
In 2010, Massie ran for Judge Executive of Lewis County. He won the primary election, defeating the incumbent by a large margin, and then beat the Democratic nominee by nearly 40 points. Massie also campaigned for then–U.S. Senate candidate Rand Paul, speaking to various Tea Party groups on his behalf.

Massie resigned as Lewis County judge-executive effective July 1, 2012.

== U.S. House of Representatives ==
=== 2012 election ===
2012 Republican primary results by county: Massie: 30–40%; 40–50%; 50–60%; Webb-Edgington: 40–50%

In December 2011, Congressman Geoff Davis announced his decision to retire from his seat in Kentucky's 4th congressional district. Massie announced his candidacy on January 10, 2012. He was endorsed by Senator Rand Paul and Texas congressman Ron Paul. He was also endorsed by FreedomWorks, Club for Growth (which spent $500,000 on broadcast ads supporting him), Gun Owners of America, and Young Americans for Liberty.

On May 22, 2012, Massie won the Republican nomination, beating his closest opponents, state representative Alecia Webb-Edgington and Boone County judge-executive Gary Moore, by a double-digit margin. In his victory speech, Massie thanked "the Tea Party, the liberty movement, and grassroots Ronald Reagan Republicans". He faced Democratic nominee Bill Adkins in the general election, and was expected to win the election by a wide margin. Massie resigned as Lewis County judge-executive effective July 1, 2012, to focus on his campaign for Congress and allow an election to be immediately held in order to replace him. He was succeeded by Lewis County deputy judge-executive John Patrick Collins, who was appointed temporarily by Governor Steve Beshear. On July 31, 2012, Congressman Geoff Davis resigned from office, citing a family health issue for his abrupt departure. On August 1, 2012, the Republican Party committee for Kentucky's 4th congressional district voted unanimously to endorse Massie as the party's nominee once a special election was called. Beshear called a special election to take place on the same day as the general election, November 6. This meant Massie ran in two separate elections on the same day – a special election for the right to serve the final two months of Davis's fourth term (within the lines that had been drawn after the 2000 census), and a regular election for a full two-year term (within the lines that had been drawn for the 2010 census). On November 6, Massie won both elections by a wide margin.

=== Tenure ===
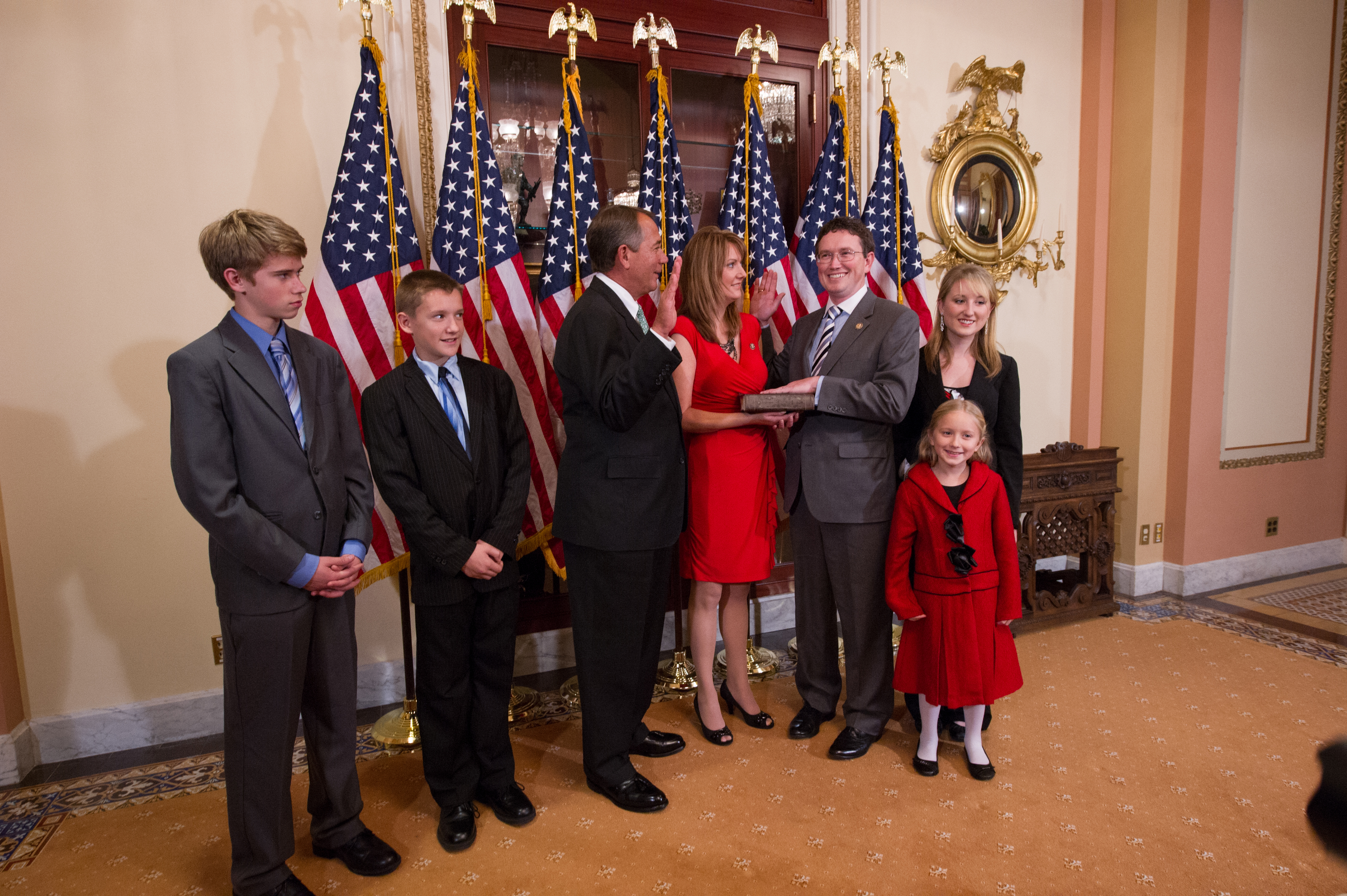
Massie being sworn into office by Speaker of the House John Boehner on November 13, 2012

Massie was sworn in for the balance of Davis's term on November 13, 2012. He thus gained two months' seniority on the rest of the 2012 House freshman class. As a measure of how much the Cincinnati suburbs have dominated the district, he became the first congressman from the district's eastern portion in 45 years.

Upon arriving in Congress he was assigned to serve on three committees: Transportation and Infrastructure, Oversight and Government Reform, and Science, Space and Technology. He later became chair of the Subcommittee on Technology and Innovation, replacing outgoing chair Ben Quayle.

Massie broke from the majority of his party by opposing the reelection of Speaker of the House John Boehner, instead casting his vote for a fellow libertarian, Republican Justin Amash of Michigan. In May 2013, he voted against the Stolen Valor Act of 2013, which passed 390–3. In December 2013, he was the only congressman to vote against extending the 1988 Undetectable Firearms Act for another ten years.

In March 2014, Massie voted against a bill to name Israel an American strategic partner. Massie voted no because the bill would have subsidized green energy companies in Israel. He said he would not support subsidies for American green energy companies, let alone foreign ones. The bill passed by a margin of 412–10, with 6 voting present.

In May 2014, Massie objected to a voice vote to award golf star Jack Nicklaus a gold medal recognizing his "service to the nation", and demanded a roll call vote. The vote passed easily, 371–10. Through mid-June 2014, Massie had voted "no" at least 324 times in the 113th Congress – opposing one of every three measures that came to the House floor. Politico dubbed him "Mr. No".

In 2015, Massie was the sole member of the House to vote "present" on the Joint Comprehensive Plan of Action, also known as the Iran nuclear agreement, citing Constitutional concerns that the treaties are not ratified by the House of Representatives and that he had no authority to vote for or against the nuclear deal. In November 2016, he voted against an extension of U.S. sanctions against Iran, the only member of the House to do so.

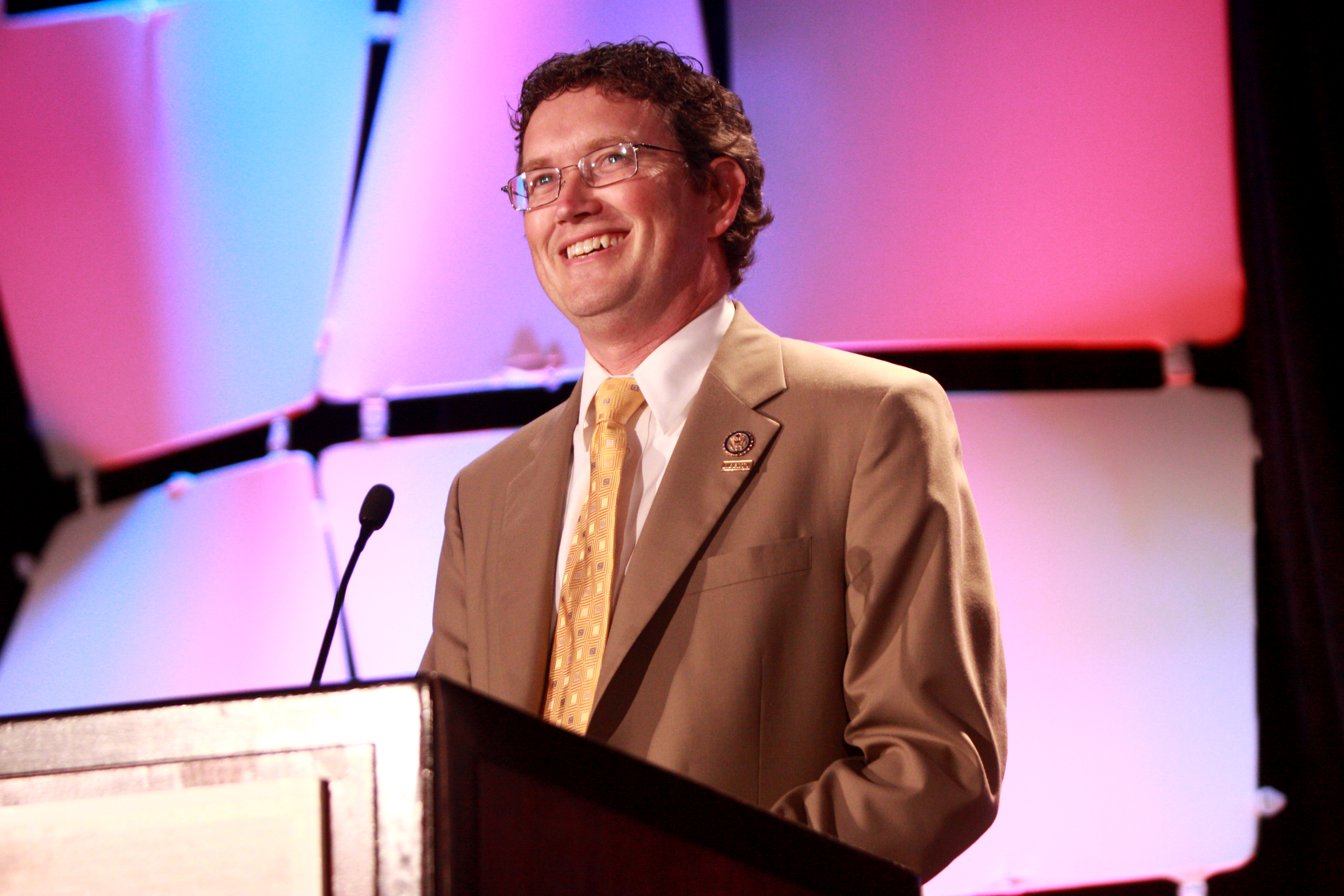
Massie speaking at the 2013 Liberty Political Action Conference (LPAC)

In February 2017, Massie introduced a one-page bill that would abolish the United States Department of Education, and cosponsored a bill that would abolish the Environmental Protection Agency.

In April 2017, he expressed skepticism over the role of Syrian president Bashar al-Assad in the 2017 Khan Shaykhun chemical attack. In May 2017, he was the sole House member to vote against sanctions on North Korea.

In July 2017, Massie joined representatives Amash and John Duncan Jr., and senators Rand Paul and Bernie Sanders in opposing a bill to impose new economic sanctions against Russia, Iran, and North Korea. President Donald Trump opposed the bill, arguing that relations with Russia were already "at an all-time and dangerous low". He did, however, sign the bill.

On December 29, 2017, Massie voted for the Tax Cuts and Jobs Act. Before voting, he said he would support the bill to cut taxes, but that he would oppose "new government spending", despite the $1.5 trillion estimated to be added to the national debt according to the Congressional Budget Office in the wake of the bill being passed.

In October 2018, Massie spoke at the John Birch Society's 60th anniversary celebration. He talked about government corruption and spoke out against the advisability of an Article V Convention to amend the Constitution.

On March 26, 2019, Massie was one of 14 Republicans to vote with all House Democrats to override Trump's veto of a measure unwinding Trump's declaration of a national emergency at the southern border.

In 2019, Massie signed a letter to Trump led by Representative Ro Khanna and Senator Rand Paul asserting that it was "long past time to rein in the use of force that goes beyond congressional authorization" and that they hoped this would "serve as a model for ending hostilities in the future – in particular, as you and your administration seek a political solution to our involvement in Afghanistan". Massie was also one of nine lawmakers to sign a letter to Trump requesting a meeting with him and urging him to sign "Senate Joint Resolution 7, which invokes the War Powers Act of 1973 to end unauthorized US military participation in the Saudi-led coalition's armed conflict against Yemen's Houthi forces, initiated in 2015 by the Obama administration". They asserted that the "Saudi-led coalition's imposition of an air-land-and-sea blockade as part of its war against Yemen's Houthis has continued to prevent the unimpeded distribution of these vital commodities, contributing to the suffering and death of vast numbers of civilians throughout the country" and that Trump's approval of the resolution through his signing would give a "powerful signal to the Saudi-led coalition to bring the four-year-old war to a close".

On April 10, 2019, during former United States Secretary of State John Kerry's testimony to the House Oversight and Reform Committee, Massie called Kerry's political science degree from Yale University a "pseudoscience degree" and called Kerry's position on climate change "pseudoscience". Kerry responded, "Are you serious? I mean, this is really a serious happening here?"

In July 2019, Massie was the only Republican among 17 members of Congress to vote against a House resolution opposing efforts to boycott Israel and the Global Boycott, Divestment, and Sanctions movement.

In November 2019, he was the sole "no" vote in Congress on the Hong Kong Human Rights and Democracy Act of 2019, which he called an "escalation" with the People's Republic of China. He told Fox Business that he agreed with "90 per cent" of the bill but disagreed with sanctions. He was also the sole vote against the Uighur Intervention and Global Humanitarian Unified Response (UIGHUR) Act in December 2019. In explaining his vote, Massie said that it would be hypocritical to take drastic action against China while still doing business with it, writing on Twitter that "please consider whether you committed enough to the issue that you would personally go a week without buying something made in China." In December 2021, he was the sole vote against the Uyghur Forced Labor Prevention Act.

In July 2021, Massie voted against the bipartisan ALLIES Act, which would increase by 8,000 the number of special immigrant visas for Afghan allies of the U.S. military during its invasion of Afghanistan, while also reducing some application requirements that caused long application backlogs; the bill passed the House, 407–16.

In September 2021, he was the only Republican to vote against $1 billion of funding for Israel's Iron Dome missile defense system. In May 2022, Massie was the only member of the House of Representatives to vote against a non-binding resolution denouncing antisemitism and opposition to Israel. Massie tweeted that he voted against the bill because it promoted censorship.

On April 16, 2024, he co-sponsored a motion to vacate filed by Marjorie Taylor Greene in an attempt to oust House speaker Mike Johnson.

In July 2024, Massie co-moderated a presidential debate for third-party candidates held by the Free & Equal Elections Foundation.

In 2025, Massie voted against the One Big Beautiful Bill Act and Full-Year Continuing Appropriations and Extensions Act, 2025. He argued both bills were not sufficiently fiscally conservative. As a result, Trump announced he would support and fund a primary challenger against Massie.

In July 2026, Massie introduced an amendment to the annual State Department appropriations bill that would have eliminated all U.S. assistance to Israel. With 103 Democrats voting in agreement with Massie to cut off all funding for Israel, but no other Republicans agreeing, the amendment failed.

==== COVID-19 pandemic response ====
On March 27, 2020, in the midst of the COVID-19 pandemic, Massie forced the return to Washington of members of the House who were "sheltering in place" in their districts by threatening a quorum call that would have required an in-person vote on the $2.2 trillion aid package that had passed the Senate by a 96–0 vote. Before Massie arrived on the House floor, just two representatives were present to pass the bill by voice vote. On the House floor, Massie said he was trying to "make sure our republic doesn't die by unanimous consent in an empty chamber." Massie received criticism for endangering members of Congress by requiring them to gather amid a pandemic.

After Massie's unsuccessful push, Trump said Massie should be removed from the Republican Party, calling him a "third rate [g]randstander"; John Kerry quipped that Massie "tested positive for being an asshole"; Representative Sean Patrick Maloney tweeted, "@RepThomasMassie is indeed a dumbass"; Representative Dean Phillips called his actions a "principled but terribly misguided stunt". In a phone interview with Betsy Woodruff Swan of Politico, Massie responded in jest to Trump's calls for his removal, stating "I take great offense to that. I'm at least second-rate." Some Republicans defended Massie: Paul Gosar called him a "good man and a solid conservative" and Chip Roy said Massie was "defending the Constitution today by requiring a quorum".

In an interview with Politico, Massie said: "The fact that they brought all of these congressmen here in order to get a quorum shows you that I was right. The Constitution requires a quorum to pass a bill, and they were planning to subvert the Constitution."

He also questioned why people such as grocery store employees or truck drivers should be expected to work during the pandemic, but not members of Congress, who "make $174,000 a year" and have "the best health care in the world".

In April 2020, Massie was one of five House members to vote against the Paycheck Protection Program and Health Care Enhancement Act, which added $320 billion of funding for the Paycheck Protection Program. Trump signed the bill into law the next day. In July 2020, Massie argued against face mask mandates and compulsory vaccinations. He faced allegations of antisemitism after comparing vaccine mandates to the Holocaust, and later deleted the tweet doing so. In February 2025, Massie called for the U.S. Food and Drug Administration to revoke its approvals of COVID-19 vaccines.

On June 27, 2021, Massie and representatives Marjorie Taylor Greene and Ralph Norman sued Speaker Nancy Pelosi after they were fined for refusing to wear masks on the House floor. A federal judge dismissed the case in 2022, ruling that Pelosi was entitled to immunity under the Speech or Debate Clause of the U.S. Constitution. The decision was affirmed by a three-judge decision by an appeals court, and the Supreme Court declined to hear the case.

==== Epstein files ====
Massie's initial video commenting on the required release of the Epstein files

In July 2025, Massie introduced a discharge petition alongside Democratic representative Ro Khanna to force a vote on a law to compel the release of the Epstein files. This again resulted in criticism from Trump, who called Massie an "Embarrassment to Kentucky". However, the petition passed on November 12, 2025, and the bill it supported, the Epstein Files Transparency Act, was signed into law a week later. The files were all required to be released by December 19, 2025, but the Department of Justice only released part of the files that day; in so doing they were accused of violating the law. More files were released in waves after then, with a fifth and final release on January 30, 2026. Following this, the department claimed that it had fulfilled its legal obligations and released all available files, amounting to over 3.5 million pages. This announcement received pushback from Massie and others, with some reports indicating that the full Epstein files consist of over 6 million pages.

In February 2026, Massie reviewed unredacted Department of Justice files related to Epstein alongside Representative Ro Khanna. Following the review, Massie stated that six individuals whose names had been redacted in publicly released materials were identified in the documents. He criticized the Justice Department's redactions and called for greater transparency. The names released by Khanna included Les Wexner and Sultan Ahmed bin Sulayem. According to The Guardian, "the Department of Justice said that four of the men Khanna named have no apparent connection to Epstein whatsoever, but rather appeared in a photo lineup assembled by the southern district of New York (SDNY)."

In July 2026, Massie introduced the Epstein Files Transparency Act II (Res. 9694) into the House of Representatives.

Massie gives list of alleged Epstein co-conspirators.

On August 31, 2026, Massie addressed the House chambers and read aloud a list of fourteen alleged Jeffrey Epstein co-conspirators in an effort to shame the Department of Justice. None of the individuals named have been charged with an Epstein-related crime, and several of the individuals have denied any wrongdoing.

==== Impeachment resolution against Pete Hegseth ====
On September 15, 2026, Massie introduced an eight-article resolution to impeach U.S. Secretary of Defense Pete Hegseth. The first three articles accuse Hegseth of violating the War Powers Resolution in the 2026 Iran war: by starting hostilities without a declaration of war, statutory authorization, or an imminent threat; by continuing them after Congress passed a concurrent resolution directing the removal of U.S. forces; and by continuing them past the law's 60-day limit. The fourth article accuses Hegseth of directing the Department of Defense in a manner that resulted in the death or injury of over 200 civilians during an attack on the Shajareh Tayyebeh Elementary School in Minab, which the resolution says was struck three times by Tomahawk cruise missiles fired from U.S. Navy warships.

The remaining articles accuse Hegseth of extrajudicial killings in lethal strikes on suspected drug traffickers that the resolution says killed at least 221 people; of retaliating against Senator Mark Kelly over his statements about unlawful military orders; of directing an operation to seize Venezuelan president Nicolás Maduro and Cilia Flores without legal authority; and of conducting an unauthorized military campaign in Yemen.

=== 2026 election ===
2026 Republican primary results by county: Massie: 50–60%; 60–70%; Gallrein: 50–60%; 60–70%

Massie's criticism of Trump during his second administration led Trump to solicit a primary challenge against Massie.

On March 11, 2026, Trump visited Verst Logistics, a contract packaging facility in Hebron, Kentucky, within Massie's district, to rally support for primary challenger Ed Gallrein. During his speech, Trump stated that Massie "has got to be voted out of office as soon as possible" and gave Gallrein his "complete and total endorsement".

The primary became the most expensive U.S. House primary in American history, with over $32 million in ad spending, beating the prior record of $25.2 million from the Democratic Primary for New York's 16th congressional district in 2024. Pro-Israel interest groups accounted for over $9 million of the spending against Massie, with him describing the primary as a "referendum on whether Israel gets to buy seats in Congress". The Guardian described the election as a referendum on both Trump and Massie.

On May 19, 2026, Massie lost his renomination bid to Ed Gallrein, the Trump-endorsed candidate.

On May 25, 2026, Massie filed paperwork with the FEC for the 2028 House election. Massie clarified on X that "This allows me to raise funds to continue my political operations ... I haven't made a final decision about which office to seek, if I run." Massie has also previously expressed interest in running in the 2027 Kentucky gubernatorial election and in the 2028 United States presidential election as a Libertarian or other Third Party.

=== Committee assignments ===
For the 118th Congress:

- Committee on Rules
  - Subcommittee on Rules and the Organization of the House
- Committee on the Judiciary
  - Subcommittee on Courts, Intellectual Property, and the Internet
  - Subcommittee on the Administrative State, Regulatory Reform, and Antitrust (Chair)
- Committee on Transportation and Infrastructure
  - Subcommittee on Aviation
  - Subcommittee on Highways and Transit
  - Subcommittee on Water Resources and Environment
  - Select Subcommittee on the Weaponization of the Federal Government

=== Caucus memberships ===
- Second Amendment Caucus
- Liberty Caucus

== Political positions ==
Massie has called himself "the original America-first congressman", and has been frequently identified with right-wing populism in the United States. Massie describes himself as a constitutional conservative and libertarian. During the 117th Congress, Massie voted with President Joe Biden's stated position 1.8% of the time according to a FiveThirtyEight analysis, tying with Rep. Chip Roy (R-TX) to be the least likely member of Congress to vote with Biden on any given issue. No piece of legislation proposed by Massie has been passed by Congress. (Note: The Epstein Files Transparency Act, while coauthored by Massie, was introduced in the House by Ro Khanna.)

=== Agriculture ===
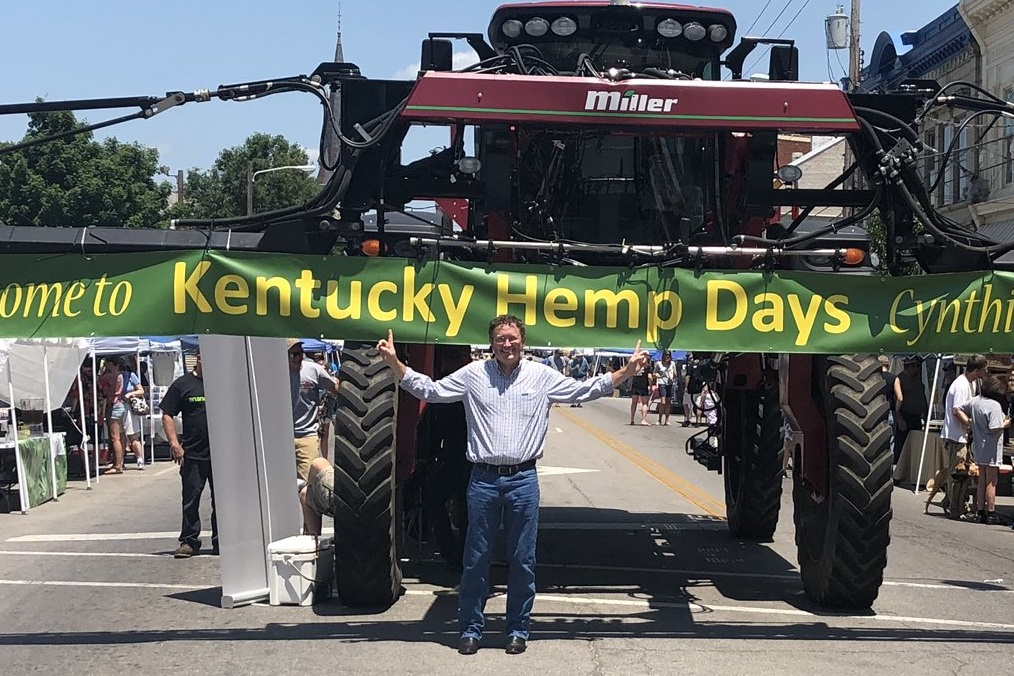
Massie at the Kentucky Hemp Days festival in 2018

In 2014, Massie introduced the Milk Freedom Act and the Interstate Milk Freedom Act, a pair of bills that would allow the transportation of raw milk across state borders.

In 2015, Massie introduced the Processing Revival and Intrastate Meat Exemption (PRIME) Act to allow small meat processors and slaughterhouses to sell uninspected or locally inspected meat directly to consumers within the same state. As of August 2026, it was included in the proposed 2026 farm bill.

==== Cannabis ====
Massie has supported efforts to legalize industrial hemp cultivation, introducing the Industrial Hemp Farming Act in 2013 as well as hemp-related amendments in 2013, 2014, and 2015 that were approved by the House. In 2013 he testified before the Kentucky Senate regarding the issue.

Massie has stated that medical cannabis patients should be able to legally purchase firearms and that he would introduce legislation allowing them to do so. Massie has endorsed legislation in Kentucky to legalize the medical use of cannabis.

=== Criminal justice ===
Massie has criticized civil asset forfeiture laws, calling them "legal robbery" and "completely unconstitutional". In 2019, he helped introduce the Fifth Amendment Integrity Restoration Act to reform federal asset forfeiture policies.

On February 26, 2020, Massie voted against making lynching a federal hate crime.

On February 28, 2022, he was one of three representatives to vote against the similar Emmett Till Antilynching Act.

=== Environment ===
Massie does not believe in the scientific consensus on climate change. He has said, "I think the jury is still out on the contribution of our activities to the change in the earth's climate." During a 2019 House Oversight Committee hearing on the impact of climate change, Massie suggested that concerns over rising carbon dioxide levels were exaggerated.

Massie supports dismantling the Environmental Protection Agency. He voted to block the Department of Defense from spending on climate adaptation. He voted to repeal the Stream Protection Rule, which imposed stricter requirements on coal mining to prevent coal debris from getting into waterways.

In 2018, after French president Emmanuel Macron spoke to Congress and mentioned his desire that the United States rejoin the Paris Climate Accords to curb climate change, Massie said Macron was "a socialist militarist globalist science-alarmist. The dark future of the American Democratic Party."

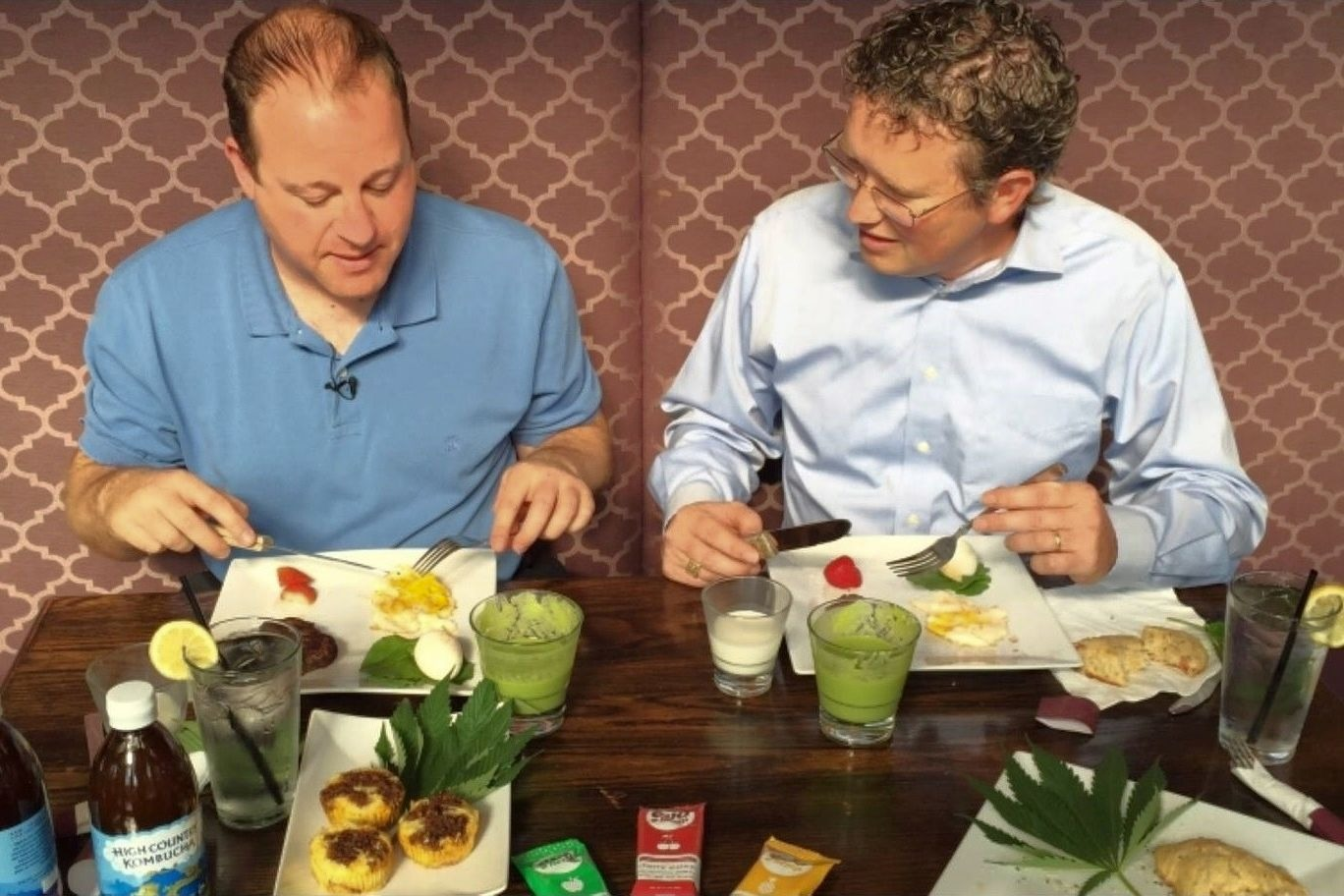
Massie and then-representative Jared Polis promote "food freedom" legislation by sharing a meal that includes hemp scones, raw milk, kombucha, and beef raised by Massie (August 2015).

==== Disaster relief ====
Massie is among a handful of members of Congress who consistently vote to block disaster relief. However, he has consistently supported disaster relief for natural disasters that have struck Kentucky.

In February 2023, Massie and Marjorie Taylor Greene were the only two representatives to vote against a nonpartisan resolution mourning those killed in the 2023 Turkey–Syria earthquakes, which also condemned Syrian dictator Bashar al-Assad for his alleged attempts to "cynically exploit the disaster to evade international pressure and accountability".

=== Foreign policy ===
Massie has supported various efforts to scale back the use of the U.S. military abroad. He supported legislation in 2019 to repeal the Authorization for Use of Military Force of 2001, arguing that it is too broad and that Congress should reclaim its constitutional responsibility to declare war. He also supported efforts to withdraw U.S. forces from Iraq and Afghanistan, and introduced a bill in 2019 to clarify that no authority exists for military action against Iran. Massie introduced legislation to stop unauthorized military operations in Egypt and Syria, as well as legislation blocking unauthorized military aid from being sent to Syrian rebels. Massie opposes bills that sanction foreign governments.

==== Iran ====
Massie voted "present" on the 2015 Iran nuclear agreement, the only member of the House to do so and the only Republican to not vote against it. Massie was the only member of the House to vote against extending sanctions on Iran in 2016. He was also one of three House members to vote against a 2017 bill to impose new sanctions on Iran, Russia, and North Korea.

He criticized the 2025 United States strikes on Iranian nuclear sites. Massie has argued that Trump started the 2026 Iran war as a distraction from the Epstein files.

In 2026, Massie introduced articles of impeachment against Defense Secretary Pete Hegseth, citing in part the Iran war and the 2026 Minab school attack.

==== Israel ====
Massie's voting against party lines has led to criticism from President Donald Trump.

Massie joined eight Democratic representatives in 2021 in voting against providing $1 billion in American funding for Israel's Iron Dome air defense system, stating that he opposed all foreign military aid out of concern about the national debt. In 2019, he was the only Republican House member to vote against condemning the Boycott, Divestment and Sanctions (BDS) movement, stating that he opposed federal efforts to condemn any type of private boycott. In November 2023, he was one of just two members of Congress to oppose a resolution affirming Israel's right to exist and equating anti-Zionism to antisemitism.

Massie has been outspoken against the American Israel Public Affairs Committee (AIPAC) and its influence on American politics, and in December 2023 tweeted out a meme appearing to contrast Zionism with American patriotism. In May 2024, AIPAC and allied groups announced a $300,000 ad campaign targeting Massie for perceived "anti-Israel views" while not officially endorsing any primary challenger. In a June 2024 interview, he claimed that each Republican member of Congress besides himself has an "AIPAC person" that directs them to vote in line with the positions of the organization.

In July 2024, Massie boycotted Benjamin Netanyahu's address to Congress, calling it "political theater"; he was the only Republican to do so. In July 2026, Massie introduced an amendment to the annual State Department appropriations bill that would have eliminated all regularly appropriated U.S. assistance to Israel. With 103 Democrats voting in agreement with Massie to cut off all funding for Israel, but no other Republicans agreeing, the amendment failed.

In May 2026, Massie introduced the AIPAC Act to amend the Foreign Agents Registration Act (FARA) and require lobbying organizations such as AIPAC to register as foreign agents, in line with that of nations such as Russia and China.

==== Russia and Ukraine ====
In 2019, Massie was the only member of Congress to oppose an act that refused to recognize Russia's annexation of Crimea.

He was also one of three members to oppose a March 2022 resolution supporting Ukraine's sovereignty after it was invaded by Russia. He later amplified Russian claims that Ukraine was developing biological weapons. Massie opposed a resolution in 2022 to support Sweden and Finland joining NATO, saying he did not want to "subsidize socialist Europe's defense".

In March 2024 he voted against House Resolution 149 condemning "the wrongful and illegal kidnapping of children from Ukraine" by Russia, one of nine Republicans to do so.

==== Other ====
Massie was the sole member of Congress to vote against the Hong Kong Human Rights and Democracy Act in November 2019, the UIGHUR Act condemning the treatment of Chinese Uyghurs in December 2019, and the Uyghur Forced Labor Prevention Act in 2021. Massie stated that he opposed United States intervention in other nations' internal affairs.

He was one of 14 House Republicans to vote against a measure condemning the Myanmar coup d'état that overwhelmingly passed in 2021.

=== Government surveillance ===
Massie is a critic of the PATRIOT Act and warrantless surveillance of Americans. In 2014, he sponsored an amendment to stop warrantless "backdoor" searches of U.S. citizens' online data; it passed the House 293–123. The amendment also contained a provision prohibiting the NSA or CIA from requesting companies to install surveillance backdoors in their products.

In 2015, Massie introduced the Surveillance State Repeal Act, a bill that sought to repeal the PATRIOT Act and the FISA Amendments Act. Also in 2015, he joined with Representative Justin Amash in an effort to ensure the expiration of certain provisions of the PATRIOT Act.

Massie has called for NSA whistleblower Edward Snowden to be pardoned and for Director of National Intelligence James Clapper to be prosecuted for lying to Congress while under oath about the phone metadata program that Snowden exposed.

In April 2026, Massie and Lauren Boebert co-introduced the Surveillance Accountability Act, which seeks to establish stricter legal thresholds for government surveillance by requiring warrants for certain searches and restricting the warrantless use of facial recognition systems and automated license plate readers.

=== Government transparency ===
In 2014, Massie joined Representatives Walter B. Jones and Stephen Lynch at a press conference to call for release of the 28 redacted pages of the Joint Inquiry into Intelligence Community Activities before and after the Terrorist Attacks of September 11, 2001. In 2016 Massie joined both representatives in writing to Obama urging him to declassify the pages.

In 2015, Massie introduced the Federal Reserve Transparency Act to "require the Comptroller General to conduct a full examination of the Board of Governors of the Federal Reserve System and the Federal Reserve banks." Said Massie: "It is time to force the Federal Reserve to operate by the same standards of transparency and accountability to the taxpayers that we should demand of all government agencies."

In September 2025, Massie filed a discharge petition with the hope of forcing a vote on releasing the Epstein files. The discharge successfully passed, leading to the creation of the Epstein Files Transparency Act. It passed almost unanimously, with the exception of one member of the house, Republican Clay Higgins.

=== Gun rights ===
Massie has introduced and supported legislation that eliminates certain gun control measures. In 2022, he introduced H.R. 7415, the "Safe Students Act", which would repeal the Gun-Free School Zones Act of 1990 (GFSZA), effectively repealing the federal ban on guns in school zones and allowing state and local governments and school boards to set their own firearms policies.

Massie has also criticized President Joe Biden's plans to regulate privately made firearms by reclassifying gun kits as firearms under the Gun Control Act and requiring manufacturers to be licensed and inscribe serial numbers on gun kits.

=== Healthcare ===
Massie supports repealing the Affordable Care Act and has criticized Republicans' failed efforts to repeal the act.

Massie opposes compulsory vaccination. Massie released a statement in 2013 in which he called Roe v. Wade "one of the greatest judicial travesties of our time", then went on to say he believes life begins at conception. Massie voted against the Women's Health Protection Act of 2022.

=== Immigration ===
Massie co-sponsored the Fairness for High-Skilled Immigrants Act S.386/H.R.1044 which eliminates the 7% cap for employment-based immigrant visas, increases the per-country cap on family-based immigrant visas from 7% to 15%, and removes a percentage based offset that increases backlogs for visas for individuals from larger countries. Massie voted against the Further Consolidated Appropriations Act of 2020 which authorizes the Department of Homeland Security to nearly double the available H-2B visas for the remainder of FY 2020. In 2019, Massie voted against the Consolidated Appropriations Act (H.R. 1158) which effectively prohibits ICE from cooperating with Health and Human Services to detain or remove illegal alien sponsors of unaccompanied alien children (UACs). In 2026, Massie co-sponsored a bill to deny citizenship to children born from undocumented immigrants.

=== National debt ===
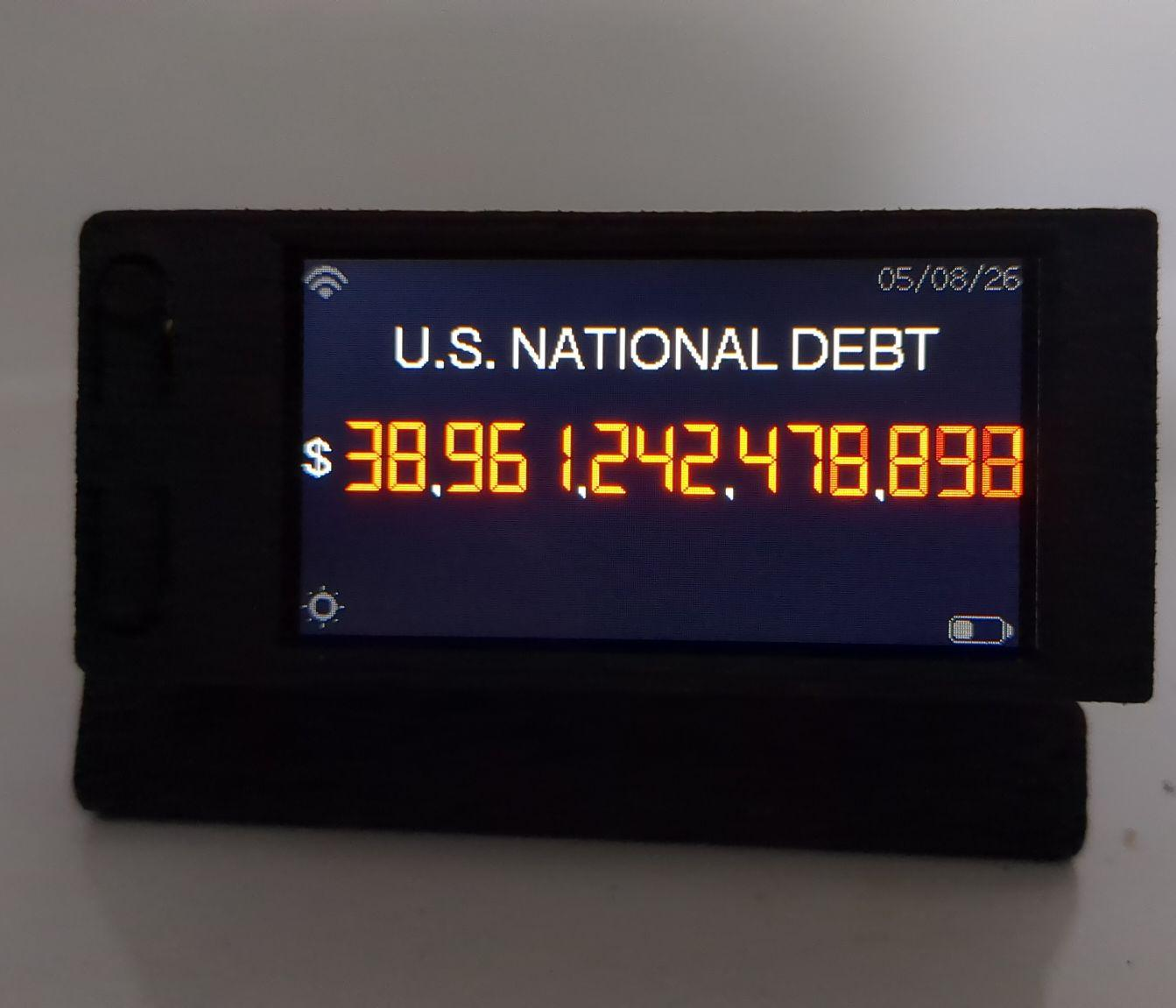
In 2023, Massie created the Debt Badge to "put the debt in the face of (his) colleagues every day".

Massie cites the U.S. national debt as one of his primary concerns as a legislator. In 2025, he opposed the so-called "Big Beautiful Bill" Act, labeling the bill a "debt bomb ticking" since it would increase the debt limit by $4 trillion. In 2023, Massie created the Debt Badge, a wearable device that provides an electronic real-time display of the U.S. national debt. He wears at all times when he is in Washington, D.C., only removing it to sleep. He states he wears it to "put the debt in the face of (his) colleagues every day" and induce "some anxiety or urgency".

=== Other ===
In October 2019, Massie criticized the jail sentence for Maria Butina, a Russian citizen who pleaded guilty to conspiring to act as a foreign agent in the United States. Butina had sought to infiltrate the National Rifle Association of America in order to influence a more favorable U.S. foreign policy towards Russia. Massie described her jail sentence as motivated by Russophobia. In August 2019, Massie said that former FBI director James Comey should be put in prison instead of Butina.

In September 2020, after Kyle Rittenhouse was charged with first-degree intentional homicide for his role in the Kenosha unrest shooting, Massie defended him, saying Rittenhouse showed "incredible restraint and presence and situational awareness", with Massie arguing that Rittenhouse did not fire indiscriminately into a crowd and stopped shooting when people showed "retreat or nonaggression". Rittenhouse, who shot three people, two fatally, was later acquitted of all charges.

He believes in intellectual property and thinks it is necessary for incentivizing innovation. Massie has remarked that this is one of the areas where he is not a libertarian.

He was one of seven Republicans who did not support their colleagues' efforts to challenge the results of the 2020 presidential election on January 6, 2021; these seven signed a letter that, while giving credence to unsubstantiated election fraud allegations made by President Donald Trump, said Congress did not have the authority to influence the election's outcome.

In June 2021, Massie was one of 21 House Republicans to vote against a resolution to give the Congressional Gold Medal to police officers who defended the U.S. Capitol on January 6. Also in June 2021, he was one of 14 House Republicans to vote against legislation to establish June 19, or Juneteenth (officially named "Juneteenth National Independence Day"), as a federal holiday. He said he "fully support[ed] creating a day to celebrate the abolition of slavery" but opposed its being named "Independence Day".

Massie endorsed Florida governor Ron DeSantis for president in the 2024 election.

On May 16, 2024, Massie introduced the Federal Reserve Board Abolition Act, that aims to abolish the Board of Governors of the Federal Reserve and the Federal Reserve banks. H.R. 8421 would also repeal the 1913 Federal Reserve Act that created the Federal Reserve System itself.

Despite being a member of the Republican Party, Massie has frequently voted against his party's nominee for Speaker of the United States House of Representatives. In 2013, Massie voted instead for Justin Amash; in January 2015, Massie voted for Ted Yoho; in October 2015 and 2017, Massie voted for Dan Webster; in 2019, Massie voted for Jim Jordan. Massie has also received votes for Speaker in 2019 and October 2023. In 2025, he was the sole Republican to vote against the re-election to the Speakership of Mike Johnson, after others changed their votes.

He co-sponsored a bill by Marjorie Taylor Greene to ban supposed weather modification, such as chemtrails, in 2025. In 2025, Massie was one of two Republicans to vote against the Senate-approved version of the One Big Beautiful Bill Act.

== Electoral history ==
=== 2010 ===
2010 Lewis County Judge-Executive Republican Party primary election
Party	Candidate	Votes	%
Republican	Thomas Massie	1,942	53.13
Republican	Steve Applegate (incumbent)	938	25.66
Republican	Bill Tom Cooper	775	21.20
Total votes		3,655	100.00

2010 Lewis County Judge-Executive election
Party	Candidate	Votes	%
Republican	Thomas Massie	2,691	74.19
Democratic	Anita Gilbert	936	25.81
Total votes		3,654	100.00
Republican hold			

=== 2012 ===
2012 Kentucky's 4th congressional district Republican primary election
Party	Candidate	Votes	%
Republican	Thomas Massie	19,689	44.8
Republican	Alecia Webb-Edgington	12,557	28.6
Republican	Gary Moore	6,521	14.8
Republican	Walter Christian Schumm	3,514	8.0
Republican	Marc Carey	783	1.8
Republican	Tom Wurtz	598	1.4
Republican	Brian D. Oerther	257	0.6
Total votes		43,919	100.0

2012 Kentucky's 4th congressional district general election
Party	Candidate	Votes	%
Republican	Thomas Massie	186,036	62.13
Democratic	William Adkins	104,734	34.98
Independent	David Lewis	8,674	2.90
Total votes		299,444	100
Republican hold			

=== 2014 ===
2014 Kentucky's 4th congressional district Republican primary election
Party	Candidate	Votes	%
Republican	Thomas Massie	Uncontested	N/A

2014 Kentucky's 4th congressional district general election
Party	Candidate	Votes	%
Republican	Thomas Massie	150,464	67.73
Democratic	Peter Newberry	71,694	32.27
Total votes		222,158	100
Republican hold			

=== 2016 ===
2016 Kentucky's 4th congressional district Republican primary election
Party	Candidate	Votes	%
Republican	Thomas Massie	Uncontested	N/A

2016 Kentucky's 4th congressional district general election
Party	Candidate	Votes	%
Republican	Thomas Massie	233,922	71.32
Democratic	Calvin Sidle	94,065	28.68
Total votes		327,987	100
Republican hold			

=== 2018 ===
2018 Kentucky's 4th congressional district Republican primary election
Party	Candidate	Votes	%
Republican	Thomas Massie	Uncontested	N/A

2018 Kentucky's 4th congressional district general election
Party	Candidate	Votes	%
Republican	Thomas Massie	162,946	62.24
Democratic	Seth Hall	90,536	34.58
Independent	Mike Moffett	8,318	3.18
Write-in	David Goodwin	12	0.005
Total votes		261,812	100
Republican hold			

=== 2020 ===
2020 Kentucky's 4th congressional district Republican primary election
Party	Candidate	Votes	%
Republican	Thomas Massie (incumbent)	68,591	81.0
Republican	Todd McMurtry	16,092	19.0
Total votes		84,683	100.0

2020 Kentucky's 4th congressional district election
Party	Candidate	Votes	%
Republican	Thomas Massie (incumbent)	256,613	67.1
Democratic	Alexandra Owensby	125,896	32.9
Total votes		382,509	100.0
Republican hold			

=== 2022 ===
2022 Kentucky's 4th congressional district Republican primary election
Party	Candidate	Votes	%
Republican	Thomas Massie (incumbent)	50,301	75.2
Republican	Claire Wirth	10,521	15.7
Republican	Alyssa Dara McDowell	3,446	5.2
Republican	George Washington	2,606	3.9
Total votes		66,874	100.0

2022 Kentucky's 4th congressional district general election
Party	Candidate	Votes	%
Republican	Thomas Massie (incumbent)	167,541	65.0
Democratic	Matthew Lehman	79,977	31.0
Pirate	Ethan Osborne (Note: Appeared on the ballot as an independent)	10,111	3.9
Total votes		257,629	100.0
Republican hold			

=== 2024 ===
2024 Kentucky's 4th congressional district Republican primary election
Party	Candidate	Votes	%
Republican	Thomas Massie (incumbent)	39,929	75.9
Republican	Michael McGinnis	6,604	12.6
Republican	Eric Deters	6,060	11.5
Total votes		52,593	100.0

2024 Kentucky's 4th congressional district general election
Party	Candidate	Votes	%
Republican	Thomas Massie (incumbent)	278,386	99.6
Write-in		1,131	0.4
Total votes		279,517	100.0
Republican hold			

=== 2026 ===
2026 Kentucky's 4th congressional district Republican primary election
Party	Candidate	Votes	%
Republican	Ed Gallrein	57,822	54.9%
Republican	Thomas Massie (incumbent)	47,539	45.1%
Total votes		105,361	100.0

== Personal life ==
Massie married his high school sweetheart, Rhonda Howard, in 1993. They attended MIT together, where she received a degree in mechanical engineering. She died at age 51 on June 27, 2024, at home in Garrison, Kentucky; Massie confirmed a local newsperson's report on the autopsy, which determined Rhonda died of "respiratory complications of chronic autoimmune myopathy" and her death was "contributed to by multiple additional autoimmune diseases". They raised four children together. On October 19, 2025, Massie married Carolyn Moffa, a former congressional staffer for Senator Rand Paul. Massie lives in an off-the-grid home that he built on his cattle farm in Garrison, Kentucky. He constructed the home while chronicling its progress on his blog, "Building a Timberframe Home From Scratch", using wood and stone that he gathered from the farm. The home is powered by solar panels and a salvaged Tesla Model S battery he retrofitted for his home's electrical system. As the owner of a Tesla Model S as well (becoming an early adopter in 2013), Massie has referred to himself as the "greenest member of Congress". As a member of Congress, Massie continues to invent.

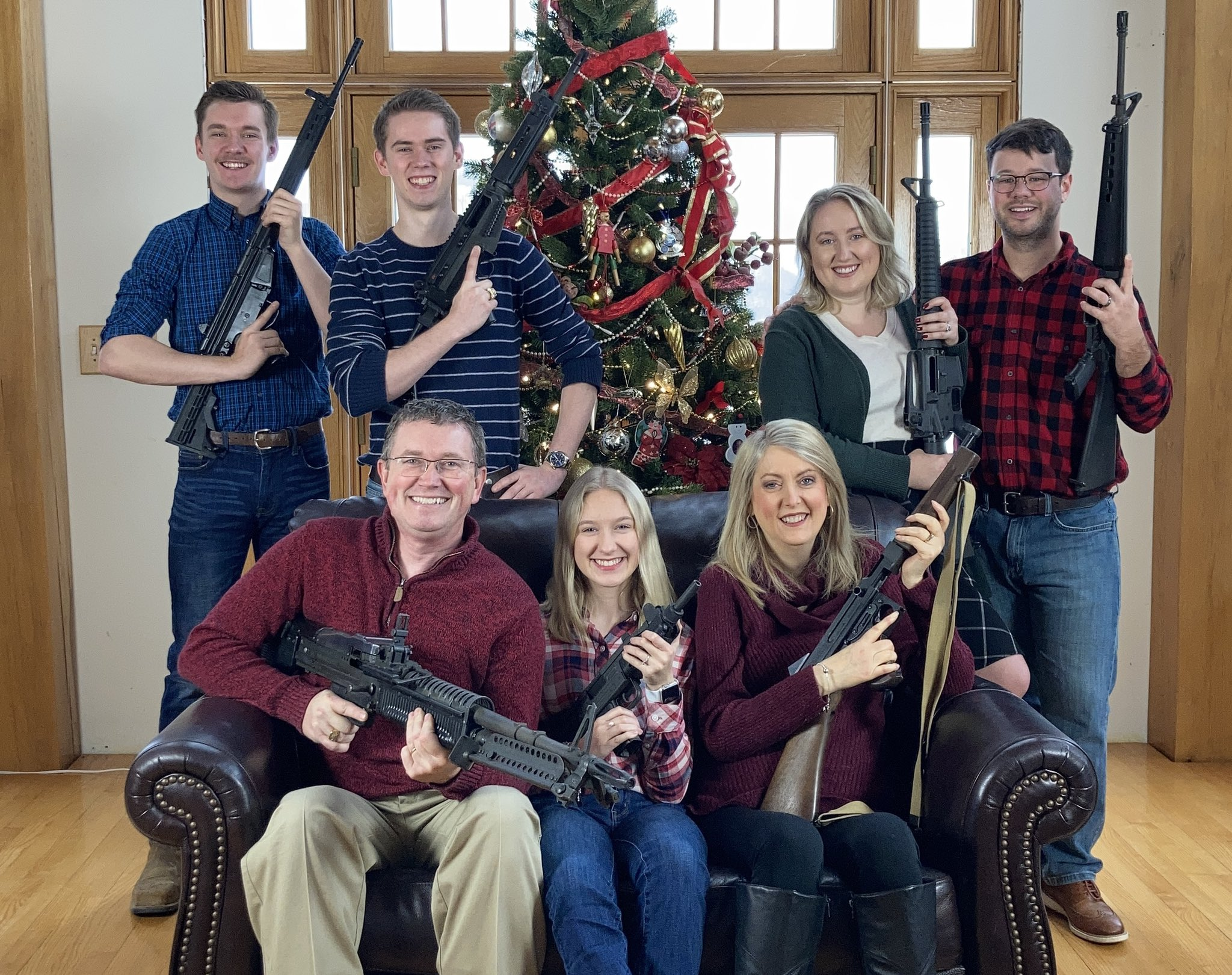
Thomas Massie and his family in their 2021 Christmas card photo

On December 4, 2021, Massie drew criticism for posting on his Twitter account a family Christmas photo with an assortment of guns, several days after four teenagers had been killed in the Oxford High School shooting. Massie said he did not intend for the card to offend but went on to say: "I was like: 'Wow, the world's not gonna see this. It'd be kinda fun to just share it.' And I shared it, and I didn't just kick the hornet's nest, I agitated every hornet on the planet."

Massie appeared as a contestant on two episodes of the TV show, Junkyard Wars, in 2002.

Massie is a practicing member of the United Methodist Church.

== Sources ==
- "Congressional Record (Bound Edition)". govinfo.gov. Washington, D.C.: United States Government Publishing Office.

U.S. House of Representatives
Preceded by Geoff Davis	Member of the U.S. House of Representatives from Kentucky's 4th congressional district 2012–present	Incumbent
U.S. order of precedence (ceremonial)
Preceded by Suzan DelBene	United States representatives by seniority 97th	Succeeded by Dina Titus
