= Garrison, Kentucky =

Unincorporated community in United States

- Census-designated place
- Location within Kentucky Location within the United States
- Coordinates: 38°36′27″N 83°11′00″W
- Country: United States
- State: Kentucky
- County: Lewis

Area
  - Total: 2.76 sq mi (7.16 km^{2})
  - Land: 2.69 sq mi (6.98 km^{2})
  - Water: 0.066 sq mi (0.17 km^{2})
- Elevation: 525 ft (160 m)

Population (2020)
  - Total: 731
  - Density: 271.1/sq mi (104.68/km^{2})
- Time zone: UTC-5 (Eastern (EST))
  - Summer (DST): UTC-4 (EDT)
- ZIP code: 41141
- Area code: 606
- GNIS feature ID: 2629620

Garrison is an unincorporated community and census-designated place in Lewis County, Kentucky, United States. Its population was 731 as of the 2020 census. Garrison has a post office with ZIP code 41141, which opened on February 26, 1886. The community is located along the Ohio River and Kentucky Route 8.

== Geography ==
According to the U.S. Census Bureau, the community has an area of 2.763 square miles (7.16 km^{2}); 2.696 square miles (6.98 km^{2}) of its area is land, and 0.067 square miles (0.17 km^{2}) is water.

== Demographics ==
Historical population
Census	Pop.	Note	%±
2020	731		—
U.S. Decennial Census

== Notable people ==
- Thomas Massie, U.S. Representative
