= Paul G. Bens Jr. =

American novelist

- Born: 1964 (age 61–62); Fort Mitchell, Kentucky, U.S.
- Education: Covington Latin School; Thomas More College
- Occupation: Writer

Paul G. Bens Jr. (born 1964) is an American writer and former independent film and television casting director.

== Early life and education ==
Bens was born in 1964, in Fort Mitchell, Kentucky, a small suburb in the greater Cincinnati, Ohio area. Bens is the youngest of four children and the only boy born to Paul and Judith Bens. His early education was at the college preparatory Covington Latin School and he graduated from Thomas More College in Crestview Hills, Kentucky, with a degree in Theater Arts. He relocated to Los Angeles in 1986.

== Career ==
Bens' early career was a casting assistant on low-budget feature films such as Martians Go Home and Trip to Spirit Island. Later, he moved into the position of casting associate on the television series Night Court, Nurses, and Stand by Your Man. As a casting director, Bens and his partner Pat Melton contributed to the FOX series Likely Suspects and Ned & Stacey, as well as the series Malcolm & Eddie on UPN. His last casting position was for the FOX network's Murder in Small Town X, for which he was responsible for the casting of actors in the fictional murder mystery reality show. He served as producer for the film hundred percent, a feature film with an Asian American cast which featured Garrett Wang from Star Trek: Voyager, Tamlyn Tomita, Dustin Nguyen from 21 Jump Street and Keiko Agena from Gilmore Girls.

An openly gay author, Bens' first foray into writing came as co-author of Next! And Actor's Guide to Auditioning, a how-to guide for aspiring actors published in 1997 and co-authored by Ellie Kanner, casting director of the television series Friends. Bens ventured into fiction writing shortly thereafter and his short works have been published in Cemetery Dance, Chick Flicks, HeavyGlow, Twisted Tongue, Velvet Mafia: Dangerous Queer Fiction, Outsider Ink and Dark Discoveries. He also has contributed to Dark Scribe Magazine's Roundtable discussions, moderating an in-depth interview with five leading voices in Queer Horror fiction.

Although Bens' fiction tends to examine the darker side of man, he has also contributed to the gay erotica / gay romance genres with his Hawaiiana-based novella Mahape a ale Wala'au and short story Me Ka Hau'oli Makahiki Hou. His first novel Kelland was published by Casperian Books on September 1, 2009, and has drawn largely favorable reviews with the author's style being compared to Stephen King, Michael Cunningham and the better films of M. Night Shyamalan.

== Bibliography ==
- 1997: Next! An Actor's Guide to Auditioning (non-fiction, co-author)
- 2001: For the Love of God (short story)
- 2001: First Kiss (short story)
- 2002: Dwellings (short story)
- 2004: Toe Tag (short story)
- 2005: The Other White Meat (short story)
- 2006: The Perfect Date (short story)
- 2006: The Fifties (short story)
- 2006: Kama (short story)
- 2006: You're Gonna Love This (flash fiction)
- 2006: Dehiscent (flash fiction)
- 2007: That Lovely Land of Might-Have-Been (short story)
- 2007: Inside Out (flash fiction)
- 2008: Mahape a ale Wala'au (erotic novelette)
- 2009: Me Ka Hau'oli Makahiki Hou (short story)
- 2009: Kelland: A Novel
- 2010: The Beheld (short story)
- 2010: Ka Heleui Hope (short story)
- 2010: Talk Story: Three Tales of Hawai'i (collection)
- 2010: The Fear of Gay Men: A Roundtable Discussion on the New Queer Horror (non-fiction)
- 2012: If You Love Me (short story) in the anthology The Devil's Coattails: More Dispatches from the Dark Frontier edited by William F. Nolan and Jason V Brock
- 2012: [Namel3ss] Magazine (contributor)
- 2012: Dark Side of the Moon: The Quiet Horror of Space: 1999 (non-fiction, [Namel3ss] Magazine)
- 2016: Discoveries: Best of Horror and Dark Fantasy, (anthology reprint of The Beheld), Dark Regions Press
- 2016: "Da Manapua Man" (short story)

== Awards ==
Black Quill Award 2010: Best Small Press Chill (Editors' Choice) for the novel Kelland
