= Hannah M. McCarthy =

American academic

President of Newbury College
- In office 2005–2014
- Preceded by: David A. Ellis
- Succeeded by: Joseph L. Chillo

President of Daniel Webster College
- In office c. 1980 – June 2005

Personal details
- Education: Simmons University
- Occupation: Social worker, college administrator, businessperson

Hannah M. McCarthy is an American college administrator and businessperson.

== Education ==
McCarthy attended Simmons University as an undergraduate.

== Career ==
McCarthy was a social worker for Child and Family Services. She was later the dean of admissions at Rivier University. McCarthy joined Daniel Webster College in 1976 as the dean of admissions and institutional outreach. She served as the college's president for 25 years, retiring in June 2005. McCarthy was the interim president and chief executive officer of the Pennichuck Corporation where she served as a member of the board of directors since 1994. She became the president of Newbury College in 2005, replacing David A. Ellis. McCarthy announced her retirement from Newbury at the State of the College meeting on November 8, 2013. She stepped down the end of the 2013–2014 school year with Joseph L. Chillo as her replacement.

McCarthy was the chair of the New Hampshire College & University Council, New Hampshire Postsecondary Education Commission. For 20 years, she was a director of the Boys and Girls Club of Greater Nashua. She was a volunteer chair and director of the New Hampshire Charitable Foundation. She is a member of the Registry of College and University Presidents.

== Awards and honors ==
In 1992, McCarthy received the Champion Award and the Annual Eagle Flight Higher Education Award from Eagle Flight Training Academy in East Orange, New Jersey due to her support towards the establishment of aviation curricula at Daniel Webster College.
