= David Justice =

American baseball player (born 1966)

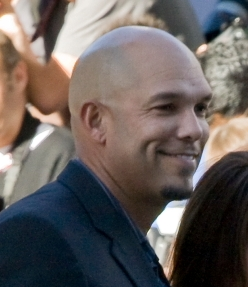
- Justice in 2011
- Outfielder
- Born: April 14, 1966 (age 60); Cincinnati, Ohio, U.S.
- Batted: Left Threw: Left

MLB debut
- May 24, 1989, for the Atlanta Braves

Last MLB appearance
- September 29, 2002, for the Oakland Athletics

MLB statistics
- Batting average: .279
- Home runs: 305
- Runs batted in: 1,017
- Stats at Baseball Reference

Teams
- Atlanta Braves (1989–1996); Cleveland Indians (1997–2000); New York Yankees (2000–2001); Oakland Athletics (2002)

Career highlights and awards
- 3× All-Star (1993, 1994, 1997); 2× World Series champion (1995, 2000); NL Rookie of the Year (1990); ALCS MVP (2000); 2× Silver Slugger Award (1993, 1997); Braves Hall of Fame

David Christopher Justice (born April 14, 1966) is an American former professional baseball outfielder and designated hitter who played 14 seasons in Major League Baseball (MLB). He played for the Atlanta Braves, Cleveland Indians, New York Yankees, and Oakland Athletics from 1989 to 2002.

After briefly being called up in 1989, Justice was National League Rookie of the Year in 1990. He was a member of the 1995 Braves' and 2000 Yankees' championship teams. En route to the 2000 World Series, Justice was the ALCS MVP. He was a three-time All-Star.

== Early life ==
Justice was raised Catholic, and attended high school at Covington Latin School, a Catholic school across the river from his hometown of Cincinnati, Ohio. He later attended Thomas More College, an NAIA school in Crestview Hills, Kentucky, on a basketball scholarship. In June 1985, the Atlanta Braves selected Justice in the fourth round (No. 94 overall) of the 1985 Major League Baseball draft.

== Professional career ==
=== Atlanta Braves ===
Justice made his major league debut in May 1989, playing for the Atlanta Braves. The 23-year-old right fielder earned the starting job after Braves fan favorite Dale Murphy was traded to the Philadelphia Phillies in August 1990. Justice promptly went on an offensive tear during the second half of the season, finishing with 28 home runs, which helped him claim the National League's Rookie of the Year Award. In 1991, the upstart Braves surged to the top of their division and Justice was leading the National League in runs batted in when he was sidelined by a nagging back injury in June. He finished with 87 runs batted in despite the injury and played in his first World Series.

After seeing his production slide slightly in 1992, Justice enjoyed a solid 1993 season. He finished with 40 home runs, 120 runs batted in (RBIs), and 78 walks, finishing third in MVP voting behind Barry Bonds and Lenny Dykstra. Justice was batting .313 with a .427 on-base percentage and .531 slugging average when the strike ended play in 1994. When baseball returned in 1995, Justice helped his Braves to the World Series against the Cleveland Indians. He drew attention (and boos) when he criticized Atlanta fans for the level of support they were providing the team. However, Justice ended up a hero when his crucial home run in Game 6 provided the only run in a game that clinched the championship.

In May 1996, a swing and miss in a game against the Pittsburgh Pirates caused a season-ending shoulder separation.

=== Cleveland Indians ===
Just before the start of the 1997 season, the Braves traded Justice along with outfielder Marquis Grissom to the Cleveland Indians for outfielder Kenny Lofton and relief pitcher Alan Embree. He hit .329 with a .418 OBP and .596 slugging percentage in 1997, with 33 home runs, while making another World Series appearance. In 1998, he had 21 home runs, 88 RBIs, and a .476 slugging percentage, numbers he repeated exactly in 1999, though in 13 fewer games played. In 2000, he already had 21 home runs by June 29.

=== New York Yankees ===
On June 29, 2000, the Indians traded Justice to the New York Yankees for outfielder Ricky Ledée and two players to be named, who turned out to be pitchers Jake Westbrook and Zach Day. Justice won the League Championship Series Most Valuable Player Award for the 2000 American League Championship Series en route to his second World Series championship. Between the Indians and Yankees, Justice hit a career-high 41 home runs in 2000. His production slid considerably in 2001, when a groin injury put him on the disabled list twice.

=== Oakland Athletics ===
The Yankees traded Justice to the New York Mets on December 7, 2001, for third baseman Robin Ventura. A week later, the Mets dealt him to the Oakland Athletics in exchange for pitchers Mark Guthrie and Tyler Yates. The Mets paid $1.2 million of Justice's $7 million salary for the 2002 season.

Justice was named the American League Player of the Week for the first week of the 2002 season, and was part of the Athletics' 20-game winning streak that year. After hitting 11 home runs with a .266 average and .785 On-base plus slugging at age 36, Justice announced his retirement on Dan Patrick's radio show the following February, citing "a diminished desire to play".

=== Career totals ===
Justice finished his career with a .279 batting average, a .378 OBP and .500 slugging percentage, 929 runs scored, 1,571 hits, 280 doubles, 24 triples, 305 home runs, 903 walks and 1,017 RBIs in 1,610 games. From 1991 to his last season in 2002, Justice's teams made the postseason every year (with the exception of the strike-shortened 1994 season), and reached the World Series seven times, winning twice. He is in the top ten in a number of career postseason categories, such as at-bats, games played, hits, doubles and runs scored.

=== Honors ===
On May 9, 1994, Justice was listed in People's "50 Most Beautiful People" issue (Vol. 41 No. 17). The article goes on to state: "'I check my face to make sure there's nothing sticking on it,' he says. 'But I don't make sure every hair's in place.' He needn't worry. He gets the most fan mail on the team and is mobbed when he makes personal appearances on behalf of charities."

In March 2007, it was announced that Justice would be inducted into the Atlanta Braves Hall of Fame. He was the first member of any of the Braves' 14 consecutive division title teams (1991–2005, excluding the strike-shortened season in 1994) to be inducted in the Braves Hall of Fame. The induction took place on August 17, 2007. Numerous ex-Braves players and coaches were in attendance and tribute videos from Braves legend Hank Aaron and former owner Ted Turner were shown. Prior to that evening's game Justice was presented with a portrait by sports artist Bart Forbes during an on-field ceremony.

Justice was eligible for the Major League Baseball Hall of Fame in 2008, but he received only one vote, preventing him from being named on future ballots.

=== Mitchell Report ===
In an interview for the Mitchell Report, released December 13, 2007, Justice denied using performance-enhancing substances, but was willing to report the names of individuals he suspected, though he claimed to have no direct knowledge of any other player's steroid use. He also claims to have never been warned of the side effects of steroids or explicitly told steroids were a banned substance. The Mitchell Report states that in a later interview, former New York Mets clubhouse attendant Kirk Radomski claimed to have sold Justice human growth hormone when Justice was with the Yankees after the 2000 World Series. Justice has called the allegation "a bald-faced lie" and says that he has never met Radomski.

Justice has claimed that his only involvement with performance-enhancing drugs was a discussion about HGH in 2000 with Brian McNamee, then the New York Yankees' strength coach. Justice, who had shoulder problems, thought that HGH might aid in his recovery. Justice stated that after the discussion, he went to his locker and found a bag containing HGH and several injection needles; Justice claimed that he was unwilling to inject himself and never used any of it. Justice further stated in the interviews that all claims in the Mitchell Report concerning his alleged purchase and use of any performance-enhancing drugs were false and encouraged all players whose names appear in the report, especially Roger Clemens, to publicly deny any claims made by the Mitchell Report if they are untrue.

== Broadcasting career ==
After his playing career, Justice served as a commentator for ESPN baseball telecasts for two years. He later joined the YES Network of the New York Yankees as a game and studio analyst, and also hosted the network's youth-oriented program Yankees on Deck. Prior to the 2008 season, the YES Network announced that Justice would not appear on air during that season, but would contribute articles to the network's website. Justice stated that this change was not in response to his inclusion in the Mitchell report, but was due to the destruction of his San Diego County home in the 2007 California wildfires and the recent death of his mother. Justice never returned to the network.

Justice has also appeared on a 1992 episode of The Young and the Restless and a 1997 episode of Arli$$. He was played by Stephen Bishop in Moneyball, the film adaptation of the best-selling Michael Lewis book Moneyball: The Art of Winning an Unfair Game about the Oakland Athletics baseball team and its general manager, Billy Beane.

== Personal life ==
On January 1, 1993, Justice married the actress Halle Berry. The couple resided in Sandy Springs, Georgia. They separated in 1996 and divorced in 1997. The marriage ended acrimoniously, with Berry seeking a restraining order against Justice.

He married Rebecca Villalobos, a model and furniture designer, on February 8, 2001. They have four children: David Jr., Dionisio, Raquel, and Asia. In 2014, the family was on an episode of Celebrity Wife Swap, inspiring Raquel to pursue acting.

== See also ==
- List of Major League Baseball career home run leaders
- List of Major League Baseball career runs batted in leaders
- List of Major League Baseball players named in the Mitchell Report

Preceded by Barry Bonds; Félix José	National League Player of the Month; August 1990; May 1991	Succeeded by Kal Daniels; Barry Larkin
