= Sulistiyanto =

Indonesian admiral

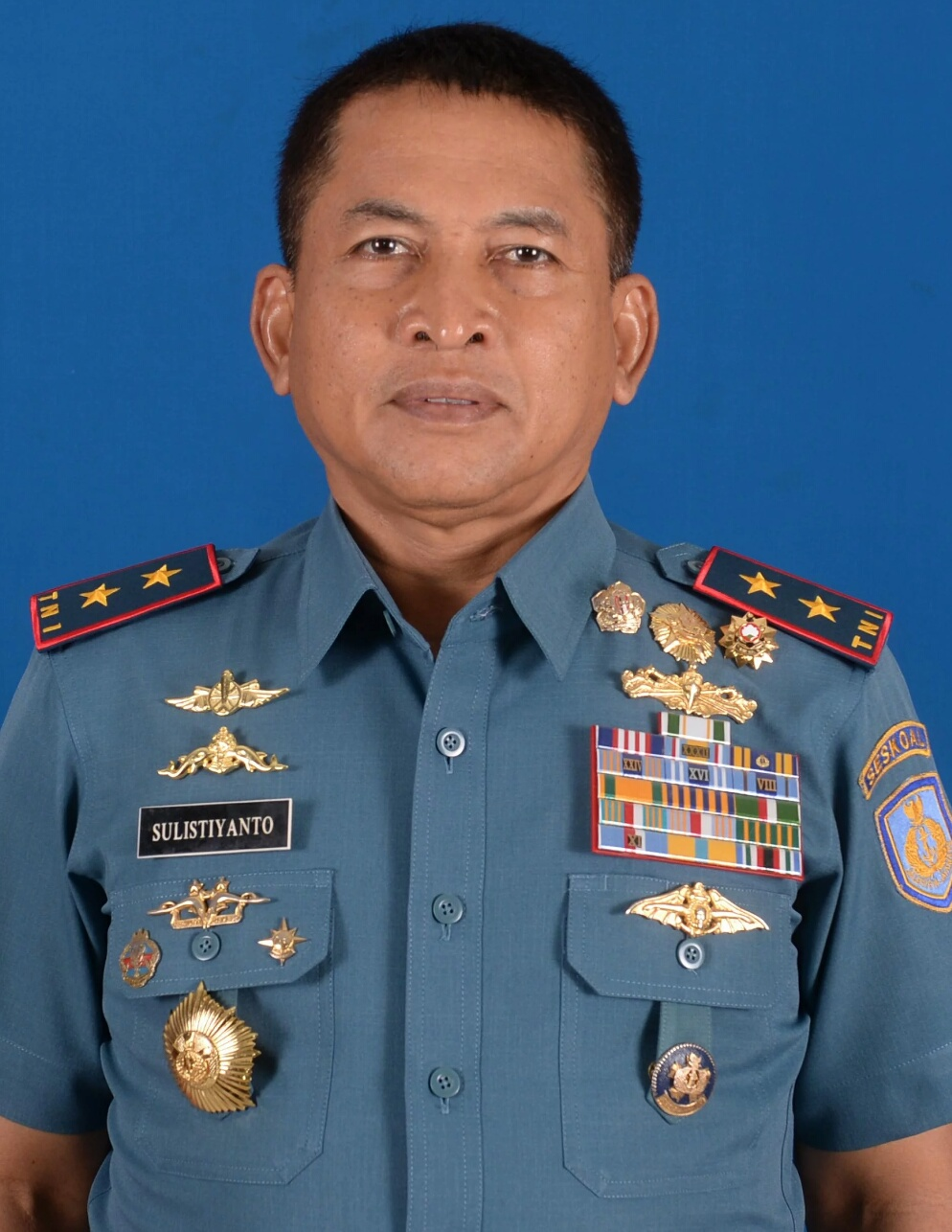
- Born: 2 October 1961 (age 65); Yogyakarta, Special Region of Yogyakarta, Indonesia
- Military career
- Allegiance: Indonesia
- Branch: Indonesian Navy
- Service years: 1984–2019
- Rank: Rear Admiral
- Commands: Chief of Staff of Indonesian Navy
- Awards: See Awards

Sulistiyanto (born 2 October 1961) is a former rear admiral in the Indonesian Navy who served as its chief of staff (Indonesian: Kepala Staf Angkatan Laut, abbreviated KSAL or Kasal) to the Pati Headquarters in the navy.

== Career ==
He is an alumnus of the AAL-29th Naval Academy in 1984. He is also an alumnus of DCCS India (Sesko) 52nd FY 1996/1997. During his service in the Navy, he has received many awards, including Bintang Yudha Dharma Nararya, Bintang Jalasena Nararya, Satya Lancana (SL) Kuwait State, SL Setiana VIII, SL Allegiance XVI, SL Allegiance XXIV, SL Santi Dharma and The United Nations Medal PBB.

Since his AAL education, he has been given the opportunity to sail abroad on the KRI Dewaruci and the Kartika Jala Krida cruise in 1983. From that experience, Sulistiyanto has served as a Military Observer at Unikom which is a person under the United Nations in between the Iraq-Kuwait border for approximately 13 months and has served as a Marine Attaché at the Indonesian Embassy in Kuala Lumpur, Malaysia.

On Thursday, 9 August 2018, the School of Staff and Naval Command (Seskoal) held a special ceremony in a series of activities to hand over the position of Danseskoal from Rear Admiral Sulistiyanto to the Rear Admiral Dr. Amarulla Octavian, as well as a farewell to Sulistiyanto, to all residents of Seskoal in connection with the end of his tenure as Danseskoal which he has held for 8 months.

== Awards ==
Bintang Yudha Dharma Nararya

Bintang Jalasena Nararya

Satyalancana Kesetiaan 32 years' service

Satyalancana Dharma Samudra

Satyalancana Kesetiaan 24 years' service

Satyalancana Kesetiaan 16 years' service

Satyalancana Kesetiaan 8 years' service

Satyalancana Dwidya Sistha

Satyalancana Seroja

Satyalancana Dharma Nusa

Satyalancana Wira Nusa

Satyalancana Wira Dharma

Satyalancana Kebhaktian Sosial

Satyalancana Bhakti Buana

United Nations Iraq–Kuwait Observation Mission

== Position ==
- Ass Padiv AKS KRI SAM-341 Satkor Koarmatim (1984)
- Padiv Bah KRI LAM-374 Satkor Koarmatim (1985)
- Pwa Bahari KRI AMY- 351 (1986)
- Padiv Nagi KRI YNS-332 (1989)
- Kadepops KRI Badik-623 Satrol Koarmatim (1991)
- Komandan KRI Siberau-847 Satrol Koarmabar (1991)
- Pabanda Staff Binkar Spers Mabes ABRI (1993)
- Military Observers Unikom Mabes ABRI (1995)
- Palaksa KRI OSA-972 Satlinlamil Jakarta (1996)
- Komandan KRI Ambonia-503 (1999)
- Komandan KRI Teluk Langsa-501 (2000)
- Pabandya-3 Sops KASUM TNI (2002)
- Athan RI Kuala Lumpur Malaysia (2004)
- Aspers Koarmabar (2007)
- Sahli C Ops Pangarmabar (2008)
- Paban VI Srenum Mabes TNI (2009)
- Sahli A Wilnas Pangarmabar (2011)
- Pabanren I Sopsal Mabesal (2011)
- Kadiskomlekal Mabesal (2013)
- Karo Kerma Settama Lemhannas (2013)
- Komandan Kodikopsla Kobangdikal (2014)
- Danlantamal IV Tanjung Pinang (2015)
- Wadan Seskoal (2016)
- Kadisdikal (2016)
- Danseskoal (2017)
- Dekan Fakultas Manajemen Pertahanan Unhan (2018)
- Staff Khusus Kasal (2019)

== See also ==
- Indonesian military ranks
