= Joseph L. Chillo =

American academic

Joseph Chillo

15th President of Thomas More University
- Incumbent
- Assumed office June 1, 2019
- Preceded by: David A. Armstrong

5th President of Newbury College
- In office June 1, 2014 – May 31, 2019
- Preceded by: Hannah M. McCarthy
- Succeeded by: office abolished

Personal details
- Education: Binghamton University (BA); Long Island University (MPA); Northeastern University (DLP)

Joseph L. Chillo, Jr. is an American college administrator and professor. He is the 15th president of Thomas More University. Chillo was the president of Newbury College from 2014 until its closure in 2019. He is a professor of humanities and American history.

== Education ==
Chillo was a first-generation college student. He earned a Bachelor of Arts at Binghamton University and a master of public administration from Long Island University. He completed a doctorate of law and policy at Northeastern University in 2014.

== Career ==
Chillo was the executive director of enrollment services at St. Thomas Aquinas College. He served as the vice president for enrollment and college relations at Colby–Sawyer College and the vice president for enrollment management at Wheelock College. In 2011, Chillo became the executive vice president of Newbury College. He became the fifth and final president of Newbury in June 2014. He also worked was a professor of humanities and taught courses on American history.

On May 1, 2019, Chillo was named president of Thomas More University.
