= Mohammad Iman Hascarya Kusumo =

Indonesian Ambassador to Malaysia

His Excellency Dato' Raden Mohammad Iman Hascarya Kusumo DPTJ (Negeri Sembilan)

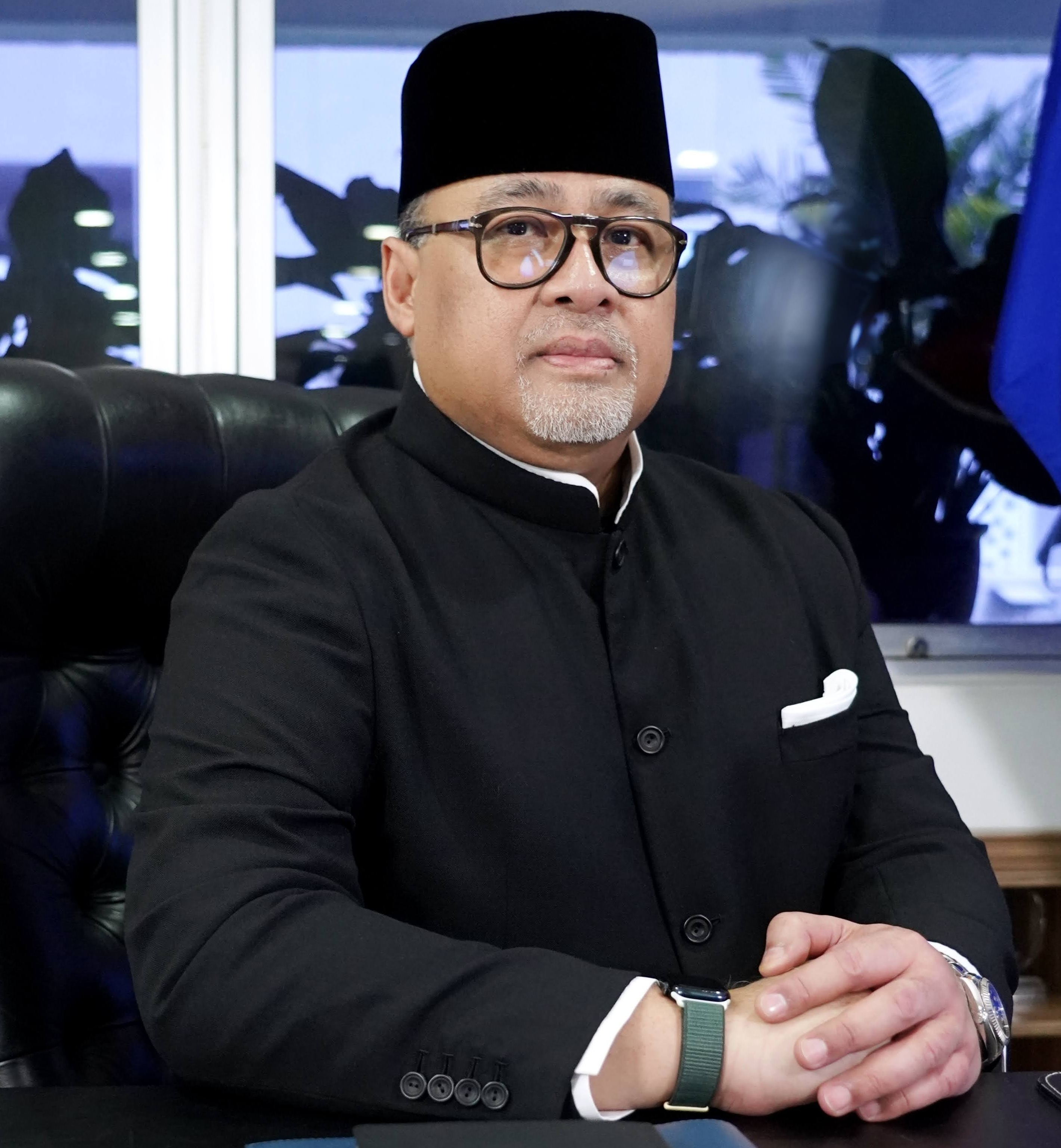

19th Indonesian Ambassador to Malaysia
- Incumbent
- Assumed office 8 October 2025
- President: Prabowo Subianto
- Preceded by: Hermono

Personal details
- Born: 18 May 1968 (age 58)
- Children: 2 children
- Education: Newbury College

Mohammad Iman Hascarya Kusumo (born 18 May 1968) is an Indonesian diplomat, businessman, and politician who currently serves as the Ambassador of the Republic of Indonesia to Malaysia. He was appointed on October 8, 2025, by Prabowo Subianto along with nine other ambassadors based on Presidential Decree No. 112/P of 2025.

== Education and Personal Information ==
Iman was born in Jakarta on May 18, 1968. Iman completed his bachelor's degree in business management at Newbury College, Boston in 1994. He married a Malaysian citizen and received the title Dato' from his grandfather-in-law, who held the title Yang di-Pertuan Agong. Iman married in 2000 to the granddaughter of Ja'afar from Negeri Sembilan and has two children. In 2004, he received the title Darjah Paduka Tuanku Ja'afar (DPTJ) or Dato' from Ja'afar in 2004.

== Career ==
Iman interned and worked at Mitsui Chemicals in Chiba and Freeport Mc Moran in Timika. In 1997, Iman returned to Indonesia after completing his studies at Newbury College.

He was a member of the Young Presidents' Organization Indonesia chapter from 2004 to 2011. In addition, Iman also served as chairman of the Indonesian Polo Association from 2007 to 2019, which brought him together with Prabowo Subianto as the founder of the Nusantara Polo Club. Iman is also a member of the Indonesian Chamber of Commerce and Industry. Iman has served as Deputy Treasurer of the Central Executive Board (DPP) of the Great Indonesia Movement Party (Gerindra) since 2019 to the present. He was also Deputy Treasurer of Prabowo Subianto's campaign team in the 2019 Indonesian presidential election and will serve in the same position again in the 2024 Indonesian presidential election.
