= Thomas More University =

Catholic university in Crestview Hills, Kentucky, US

- Former names: Villa Madonna College (1921–1968); Thomas More College (1968–2018)
- Type: Private university
- Established: 1921; 105 years ago
- Religious affiliation: Roman Catholic (Benedictine Sisters)
- Academic affiliations: Space-grant, SOCHE
- President: Joseph L. Chillo
- Students: 2,350 (fall 2024)
- Undergraduates: 2,126 (fall 2024)
- Postgraduates: 224 (fall 2024)
- Location: Crestview Hills, Kentucky, United States; 39.0217°N 84.5681°W
- Colors: Blue, Silver & White
- Nickname: Saints
- Sporting affiliations: NCAA Division II – G-MAC
- Mascot: Tommy Mo
- Website: thomasmore.edu
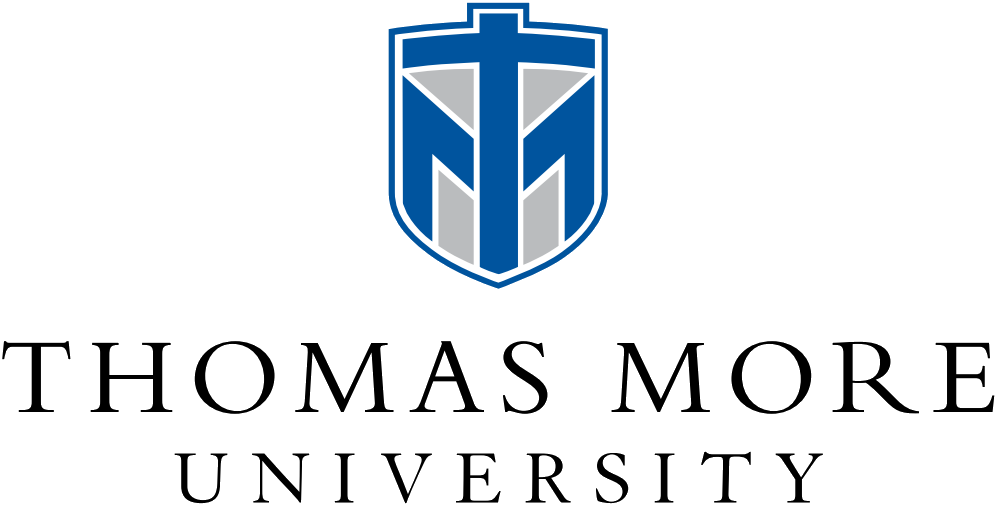

Thomas More University is a private Catholic university in Crestview Hills, Kentucky, United States. It serves about 2,000 full and part-time students. The university was founded in 1921 by the local Benedictine Sisters as Villa Madonna College.

== History ==
The Benedictine Sisters of Covington, Kentucky, founded Villa Madonna College in 1921 to train Catholic school teachers and to provide college education for young women. The college was chartered by the Commonwealth of Kentucky in 1923. Villa Madonna graduated its first students in 1929 and became the official college of the Diocese of Covington that same year. Three religious orders operated Villa Madonna in its early years: the Sisters of Notre Dame, the Congregation of Divine Providence, and the local Benedictine Sisters. Through the 1930s and early 1940s, the college grew slowly. The school year 1942–1943 closed with commencement exercises on June 4 with ten graduates. The number of graduates of the college including the 1943 class was 152.

Although Villa Madonna was founded as an institution for women, men attended many of the same classes through the affiliated St. Thomas More College, a college-level program of Covington Latin School. In 1945, Villa Madonna was designated a co-educational college, and St. Thomas More College was abolished. In that year the Diocese of Covington purchased the college. At the opening of classes in September 1945, Villa Madonna College enrolled 28 Sisters, 56 laywomen, and 28 men for a total of 112 students. As the college began to grow, facilities and classrooms were stretched to their limits. Several buildings owned by the Diocese of Covington were quickly secured for additional classrooms and offices. Over the next two decades, as enrollment and curriculum steadily grew, any available space was acquired and adapted for the college's use. Eventually, all available space was exhausted, and it was clear that a more spacious campus was needed.

Campus buildings of Villa Madonna College include St. Joseph's Hall, St. Thomas More Hall, Cabrini Hall, St. Pius Hall, Talbott Hall, Cafeteria Annex, Columbus Hall (library), St. Jude Hall, Aquinas Hall, Bernard Hall, and St. Luke Hall (art department).

In 1964, the school's chancellor, Bishop Richard Henry Ackerman, announced a building program. A growing co-educational institution, an expanding campus and the opportunity to serve a wider area made the move the natural choice. In 1968, the college was moved from downtown Covington to what is now Crestview Hills. In this same year, Ackerman announced that Villa Madonna College would be renamed "Thomas More College". Although the college was opened in January 1968, dedication ceremonies were held on September 28 with President Lyndon B. Johnson in attendance. The college serves 2,000 full- and part-time students. The same year another Thomas More College opened – a woman's college of Jesuit Fordham University in New York which later merged with Fordham College as a co-educational college and dropped the Thomas More name. Although primarily from Greater Cincinnati and Northern Kentucky, students from roughly 20 states and several countries attend Thomas More.

Kentucky's Council on Postsecondary Education formally granted Thomas More university status in July 2018. On October 1, 2018, Thomas More College was officially renamed to Thomas More University and assumed university status, with full implementation of the name change taking place during the 2018–19 academic year. Thomas More also began transitioning to a new organizational structure of three colleges:

- College of Liberal Arts and Social Sciences
- College of Business
- College of Natural and Health Sciences

=== Presidents ===
1. Mary Domitilla Thuener (1921–1928)
2. Michael Leick (1928–1943)
3. Edmund Corby (1943–1944)
4. Thomas A. McCarty (1945–1949)
5. Joseph Z. Aud (1949–1951)
6. John F. Murphy (1951–1971)
7. Richard A. DeGraff (1971–1978)
8. Robert J. Giroux (1978–1982)
9. Thomas A. Coffey (1982–1985)
10. Charles J. Bensman (1986–1992)
11. William F. Cleves (1992–2001)
12. E. Joseph Lee II (2001–2004)
13. Margaret Stallmeyer (2005–2013)
14. David A. Armstrong (2013–2018)
15. Joseph L. Chillo (2019–present)

== Academics ==
The university is accredited by the Southern Association of Colleges and Schools (SACS). The institution is a member of the Strategic Ohio Council for Higher Education (SOCHE).

== Buildings ==
- Administrative Building: Houses the majority of administrative offices (except for athletics, campus ministry, and institutional advancement), faculty offices, some classrooms, the cafeteria, and the computer center.
- Academic Building
- Science Building: Four-story building that holds offices and classrooms for the Chemistry, Biology, Physics, Mathematics, Psychology, and Education departments.
- Connor Convocation Center: The gym, training rooms, and athletics offices are housed in the Connor Convocation Center.
- Saints Center: Transitioning back to a student headquarters.
- Benedictine Library: this building houses the theatre and the Eva G. Farris Art Gallery.
- Performing Arts Lab
- Mary, Seat of Wisdom Chapel
- Academic Center: it will house classrooms, a 375-seat auditorium, a technology and prototype lab, the Dr. Anthony ’65 & Geraldine ’66 Zembrodt Center for Leadership, Entrepreneurship & Innovation, the Center for Faith, Mission, and Catholic Education, and the College of Business.
- Covington Hall: Houses a number of offices including Athletics, Finance, IT Administration, Institutional Research, and conference rooms.
- Centennial Hall: Houses the office of Institutional Advancement.
- St. Margaret Stallmeyer Hall: The newest addition to the residence hall system. Opened in Fall 2018, this traditional-style residence hall can house up to 96 students on three floors.
- Marian Hall / Howard Hall: Two connected residence halls that are co-ed.
- Ackerman Hall: Male-only residence hall.
- Murphy Hall: Co-ed suite-style residence hall.
- Thomas More University Observatory: Features computer-controlled telescopes, CCD digital imaging camera systems, and telescope-dedicated computer systems. The building incorporates a sliding roof and a climate-controlled computer room, for celestial observation projects.
- Monte Casino Chapel
- CAPE Building: Houses Digital, Graduate and Professional programs.
- Biology Field Station: Located in California, Kentucky, this facility sits on the Ohio River and is home to crucial biological and water quality research, monitoring potential threats to the local watershed including but not limited to pollution, algal blooms, and habitat destruction.

== Thomas More University Success Center ==
- Dr. Anthony R. and Geraldine Zembrodt Institute for Academic Excellence (IAE)
- Institute for Learning Differences (ILD)
- Republic Bank Foundation Institute for Career Development and Graduate School Planning (ICG)
- Dr. Judith A. Marlow '69 Office of Student Accessibility
- Professional Advisors of Studies (PAS)

== Graduate and accelerated programs ==
Graduate offerings include:

- Master of Business Administration
- Master of Arts in Ethical Leadership
- Master of Arts in Teaching

Accelerated offerings include:

- Associate of Arts in Management
- Bachelor of Arts in Business Administration
- Bachelor of Arts in Ethical Leadership
- Bachelor of Arts, Individualized Program
- Bachelor of Arts in Psychology
- Bachelor of Science in Nursing (RN to BSN)

== Student government ==
The student government of Thomas More University serves as the official representative of the student body. It is governed by its constitution and consists of an executive board, delegates at-large, and associates.

== Athletics ==
Thomas More athletic programs are known as the Saints. Thomas More University announced in July 2022 that they have been granted provisional membership to the National Collegiate Athletic Association (NCAA) Division II. Thomas More currently competes in the Mid-South Conference of the NAIA. The Saints have been in the NAIA for the past two academic years and will retain NAIA membership until completion of the 2022–23 academic year. In preparation for applying to return to the NCAA, the university approached and was unanimously approved in summer 2021 for provisional membership to the Great Midwest Athletic Conference (GMAC). With the successful bid in 2022 to rejoin the NCAA as a Division II competitor, the university will compete in the Great Midwest and be eligible for conference championships and tournaments beginning in the 2023–24 academic year. Following the mandatory transition period, the university would then become eligible for NCAA Championships during the 2025–26 year.

Thomas More has more than 700 student athletes and competes in 29 varsity sports programs. Men's sports include archery, band, baseball, basketball, bowling, cheerleading, cross country, football, golf, lacrosse, rugby, soccer, tennis, track & field, volleyball and wrestling; women's sports include archery, band, basketball, bowling, cheerleading, cross country, dance, golf, lacrosse, soccer, softball, tennis, track & field and volleyball. In June 2022, Thomas More University announced the launch of esports, which joins the Saints intercollegiate athletics programs during the 2022–2023 academic year. The program will be part of the National Association of Collegiate Esports (NACE). Esports encompasses competitive, organized video gaming.

== Notable people ==
- Paul G. Bens Jr., former Hollywood casting director/producer and author of the Black Quill Award-winning novel Kelland
- Darrell Brothers, art professor and listed artist
- Rick Hughes, NBA basketball player
- David Justice, MLB player (attended, did not graduate)
- Roxanne Qualls, Cincinnati politician (attended Thomas More, but did not finish there)
- Daniel K. Richter, award-winning historian of early America and professor at the University of Pennsylvania.
- Larry Staverman, NBA basketball player and coach
- Dan Tieman, NBA basketball player
