= Darrell Brothers =

American artist and professor

Darrell Brothers (1931–1993) was an American artist. He was an art professor at Thomas More College, Kentucky, for 25 years. During his time there he became well known for his abstract art, and later his theatrical portrait art. His work is in many museums and collections in the U.S., including the University of Kentucky's Museum of Art. Today an annual scholarship in art is given out yearly in his honor at Thomas More College.
