= List of diplomatic missions in Malaysia =

This is a list of diplomatic missions in Malaysia. At present, the country is host to a total of 101 resident embassies and high commissions; 95 are in the capital city of Kuala Lumpur, while 4 are in Ampang, and 2 are in Putrajaya, the new federal administrative center.

Several other countries accredit ambassadors from other Asian capitals, such as Beijing, Jakarta, New Delhi, and Tokyo.

This listing excludes honorary consulates and trade missions, except for those that serve as de facto embassies.

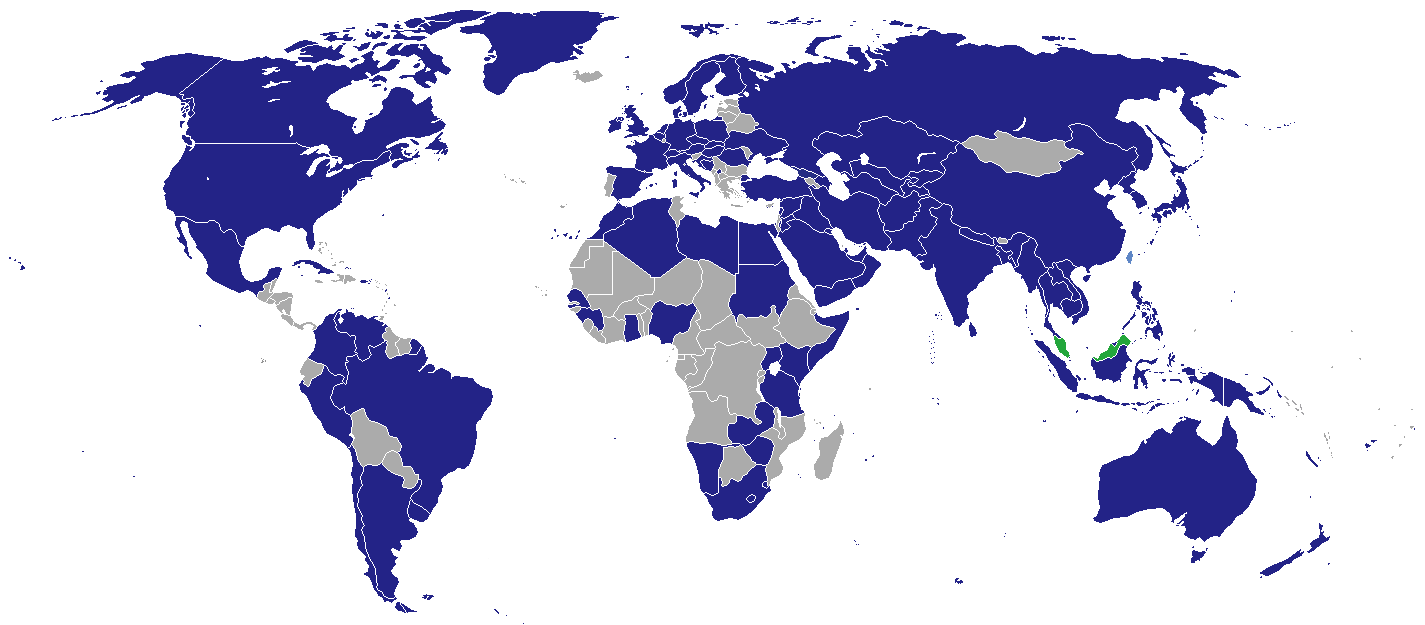
Map of diplomatic missions in Malaysia

== Diplomatic missions ==
Entries marked with an asterisk (*) are member-states of the Commonwealth of Nations. As such, their embassies are formally termed as "High Commissions".

=== Embassies or High Commissions in Kuala Lumpur ===
1. Afghanistan
2. Algeria
3. Argentina
4. Australia*
5. Austria
6. Bahrain
7. Bangladesh*
8. Belgium
9. Bosnia and Herzegovina
10. Brazil
11. Cambodia*
12. Canada*
13. Chile
14. China
15. Colombia
16. Croatia
17. Cuba
18. Czech Republic
19. Denmark
20. Egypt
21. Eswatini*
22. Fiji*
23. Finland
24. France
25. Georgia
26. Germany
27. Ghana*
28. Guinea
29. Holy See
30. Hungary
31. India*
32. Indonesia
33. Iran
34. Iraq
35. Ireland
36. Italy
37. Japan
38. Jordan
39. Kazakhstan
40. Kenya*
41. Kosovo
42. Kuwait
43. Kyrgyzstan
44. Laos
45. Lebanon
46. Lesotho*
47. Libya
48. Maldives*
49. Mauritius*
50. Mexico
51. Morocco
52. Myanmar
53. Namibia*
54. Nepal
55. Netherlands
56. New Zealand*
57. Nigeria*
58. Norway
59. Oman
60. Pakistan*
61. Palestine
62. Papua New Guinea*
63. Peru
64. Philippines
65. Poland
66. Romania
67. Russia
68. Saudi Arabia
69. Senegal
70. Singapore*
71. Slovakia
72. Somalia
73. South Africa*
74. South Korea
75. Spain
76. Sri Lanka*
77. Sweden
78. Switzerland
79. Syria
80. Tanzania*
81. Thailand
82. Timor-Leste
83. Turkey
84. Turkmenistan
85. Uganda*
86. Ukraine
87. United Arab Emirates
88. United Kingdom*
89. United States
90. Uruguay
91. Venezuela
92. Vietnam
93. Yemen
94. Zambia*
95. Zimbabwe

=== Embassies or High Commissions in Ampang, Selangor ===
1. Azerbaijan
2. Sudan
3. Tajikistan
4. Uzbekistan

=== Embassies or High Commissions in Putrajaya ===
1. Brunei*
2. Qatar

=== Representative offices or delegations in Kuala Lumpur ===
1. Republic of China (Taiwan) (Economic & Cultural Office)
2. European Union (Delegation)

=== Representative offices or delegations in Putrajaya ===
1. United Nations (Resident Coordinator's Office)

=== Gallery ===
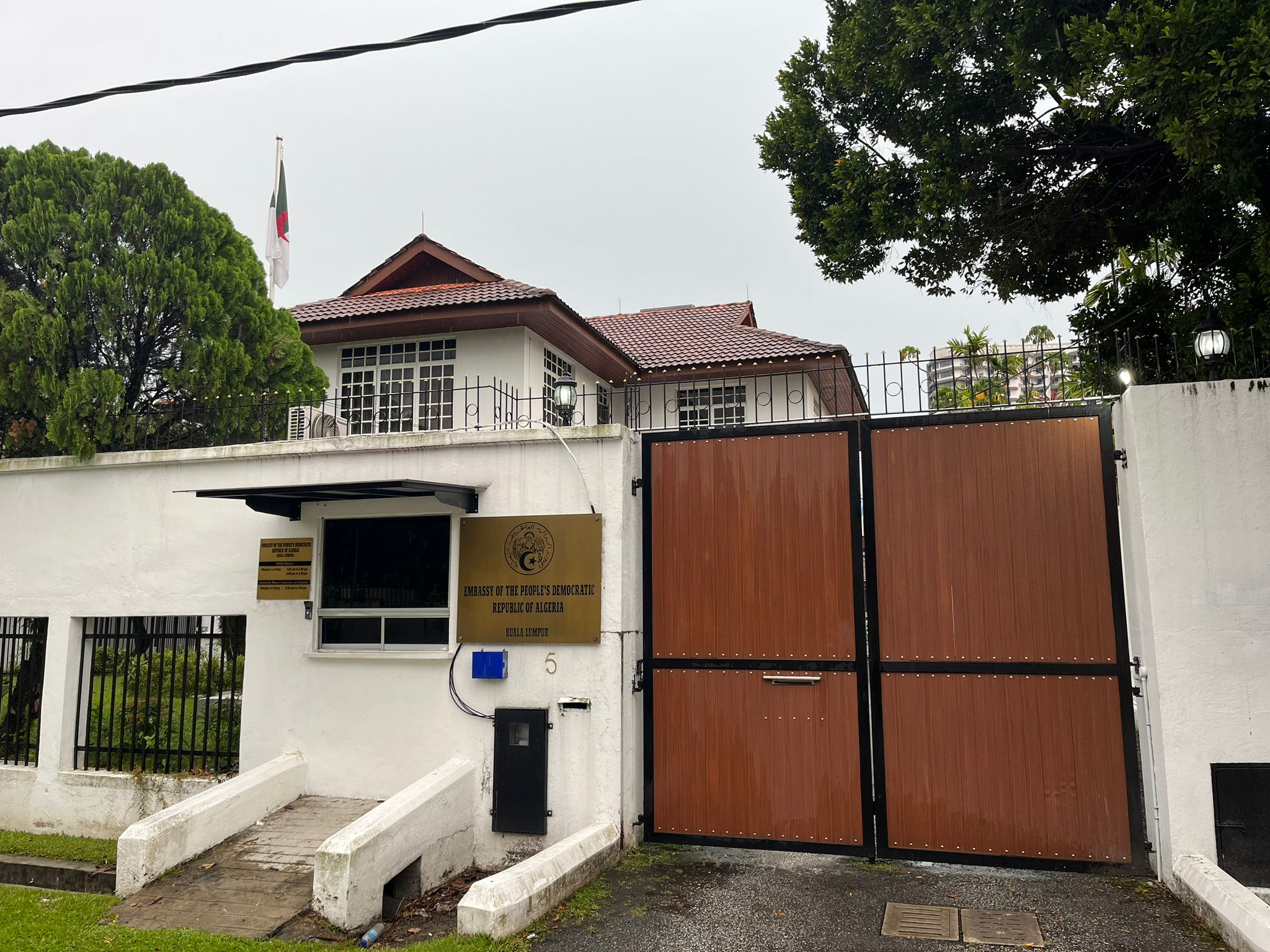
Embassy of Algeria

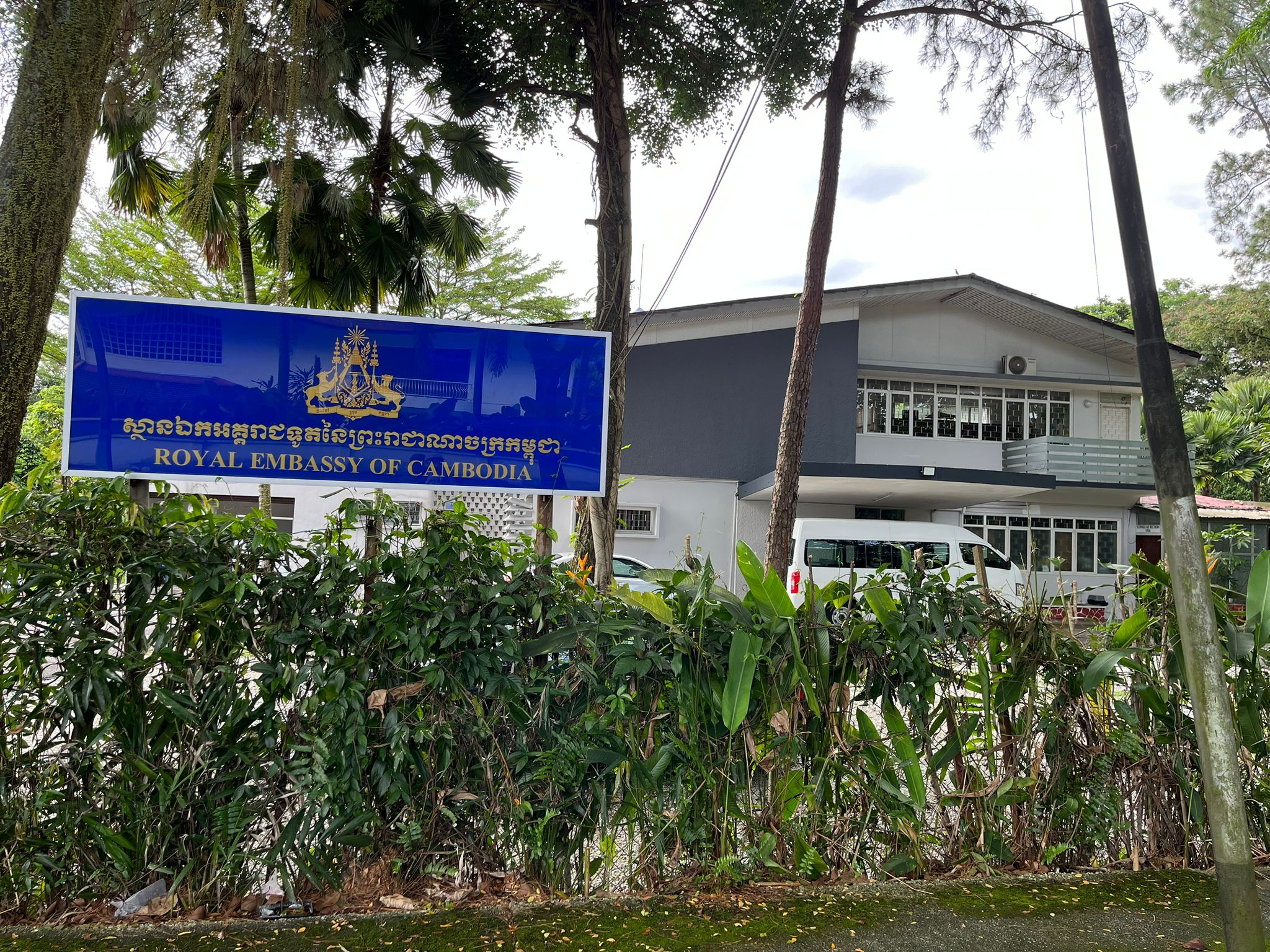
Embassy of Cambodia

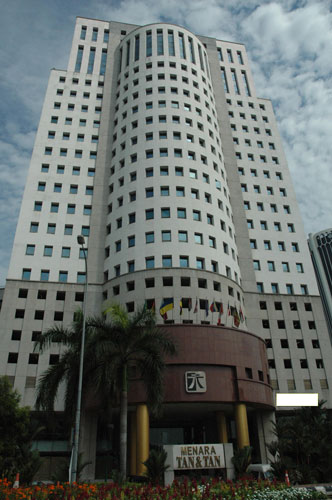
Building hosting the High Commission of Canada, and the embassies of Belgium, Brazil, Germany, Kosovo, Mexico, Syria, Turkey, Uganda, Ukraine, and Venezuela

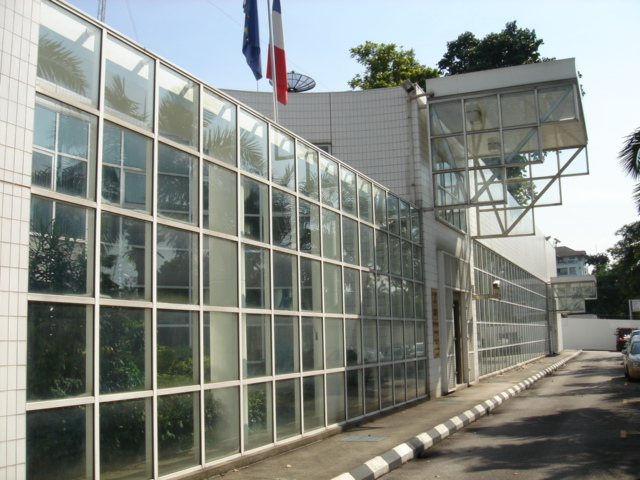
Embassy of France

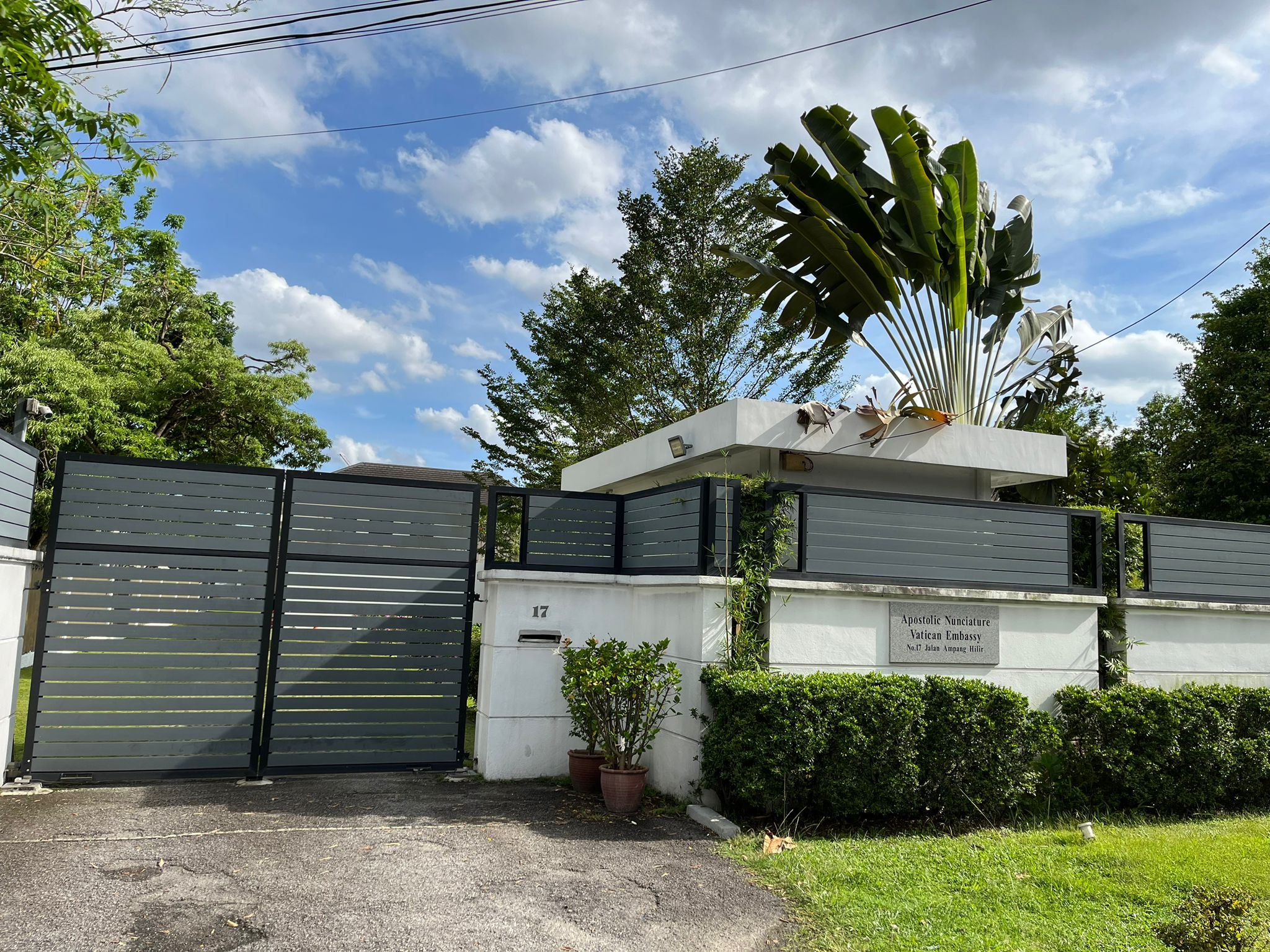
Apostolic Nunciature of the Holy See

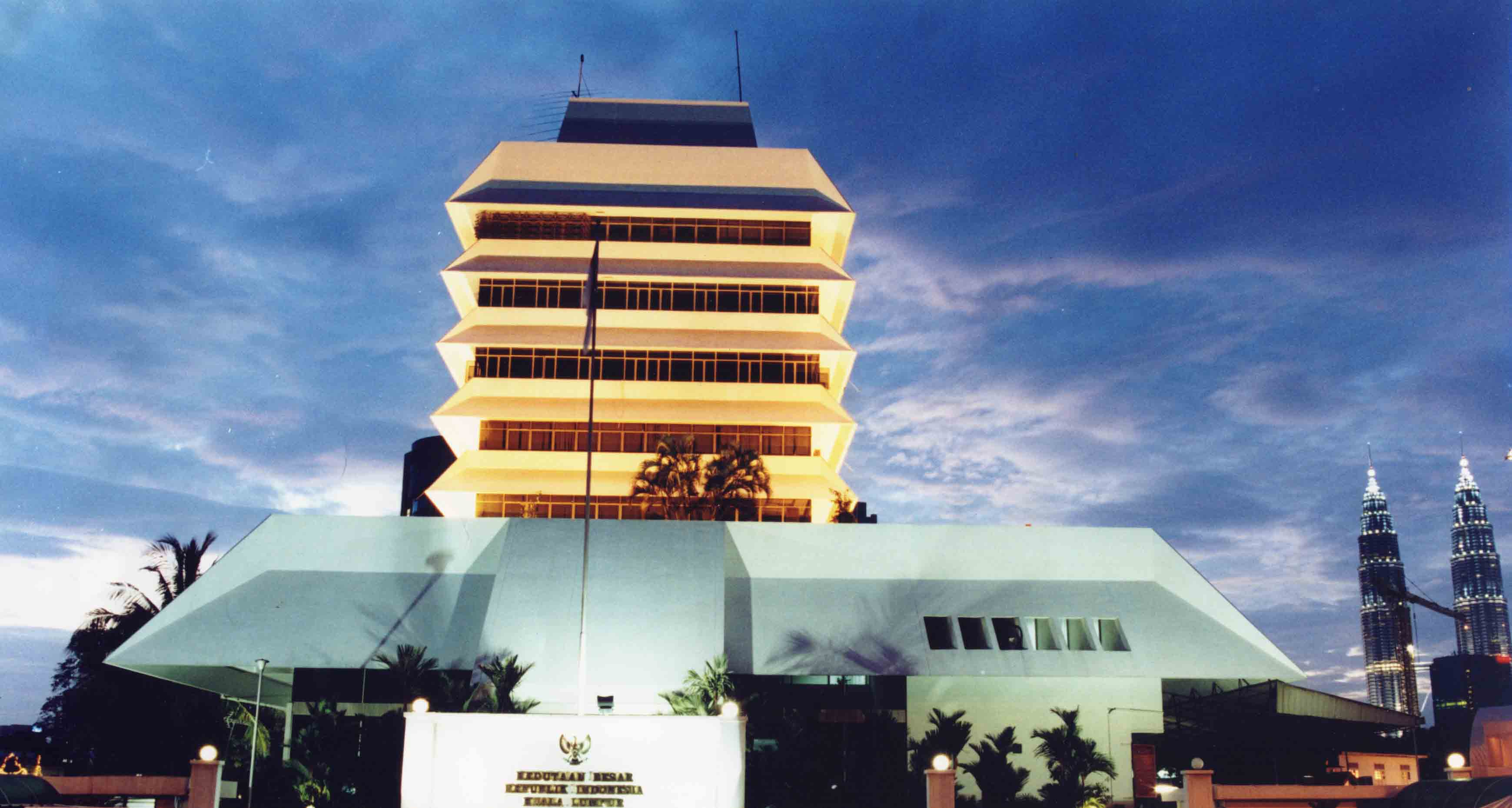
Embassy of Indonesia

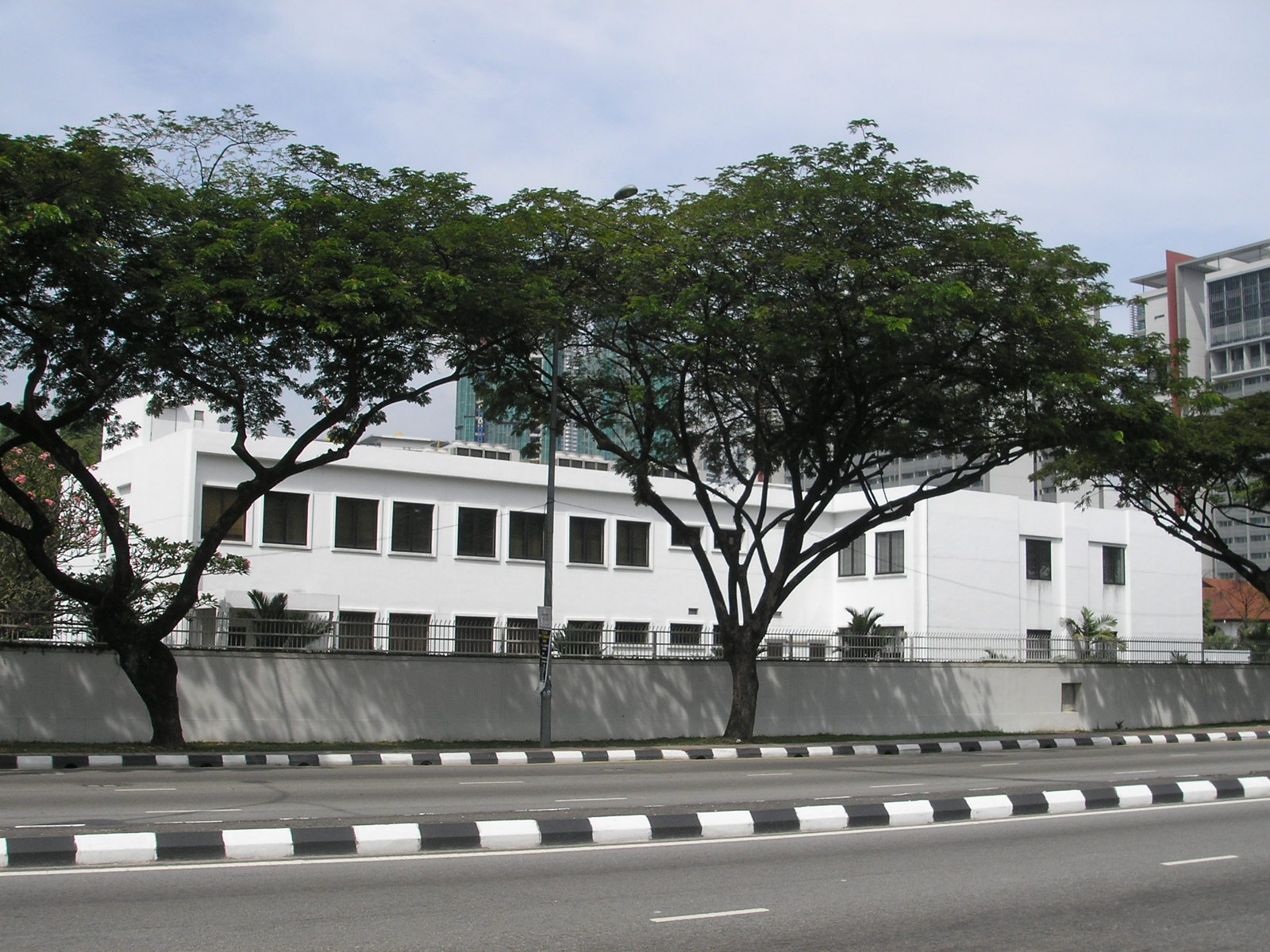
Embassy of Japan

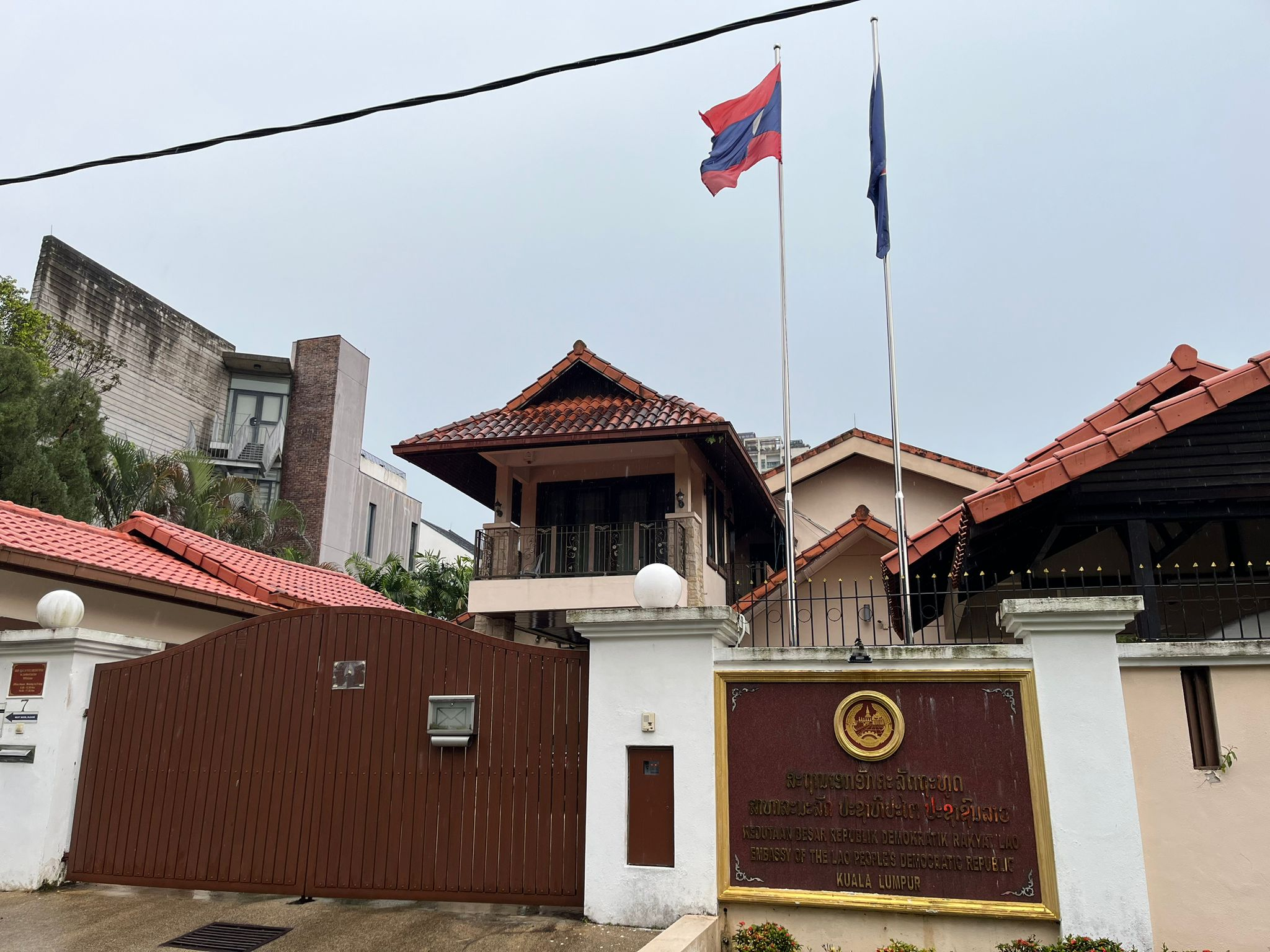
Embassy of Laos

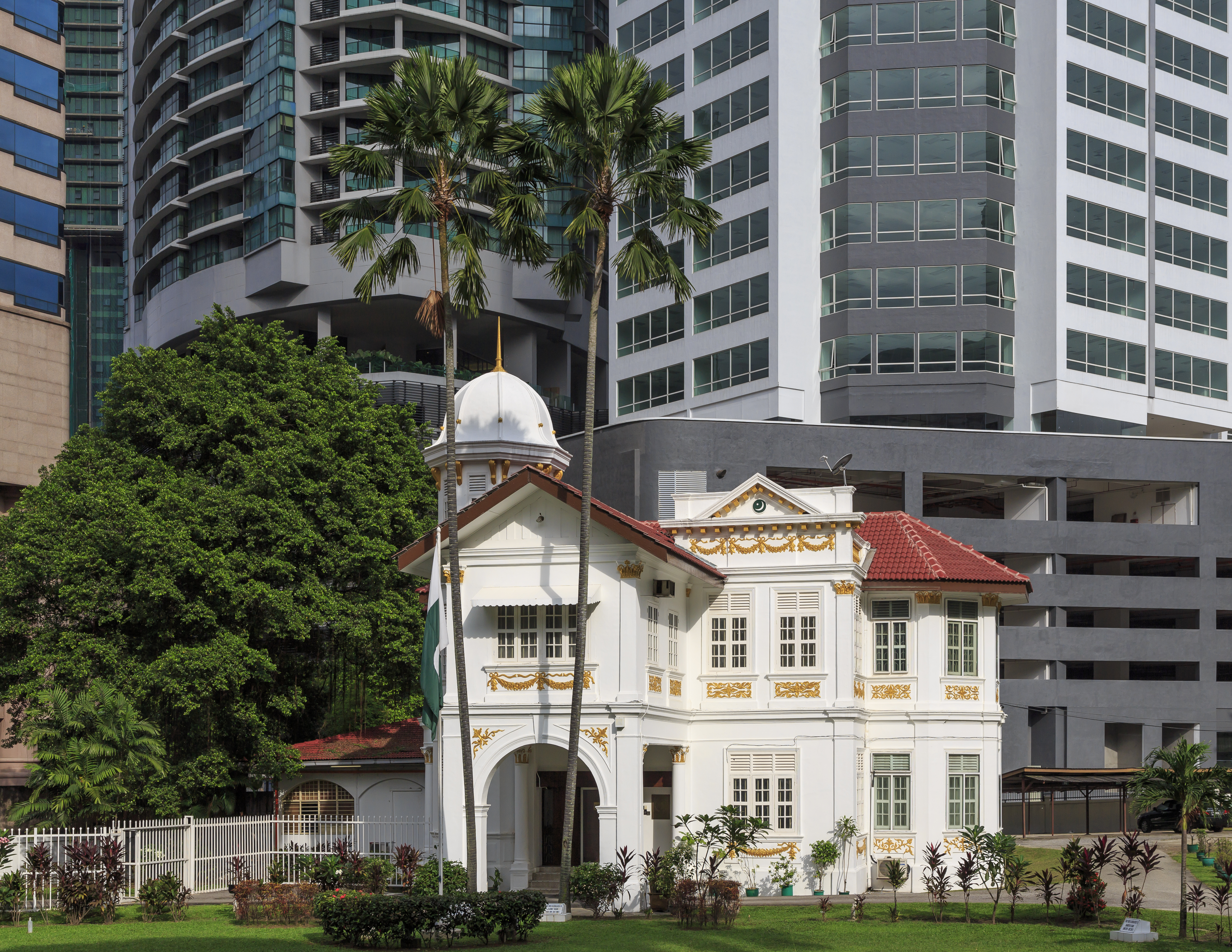
High Commission of Pakistan

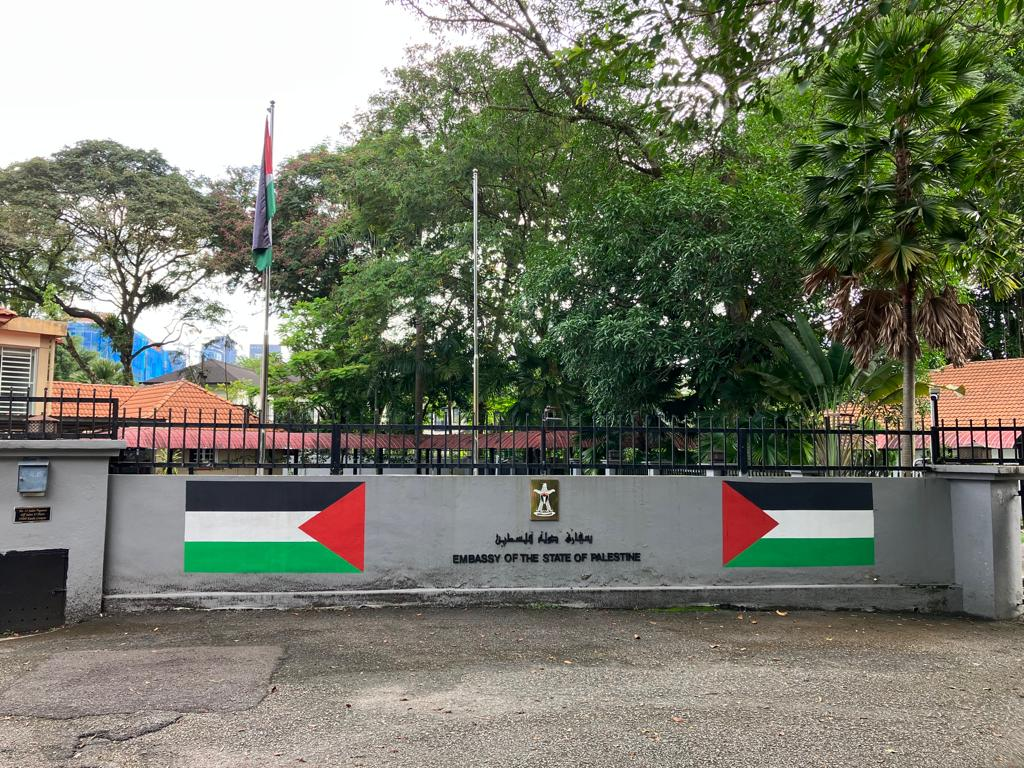
Embassy of Palestine

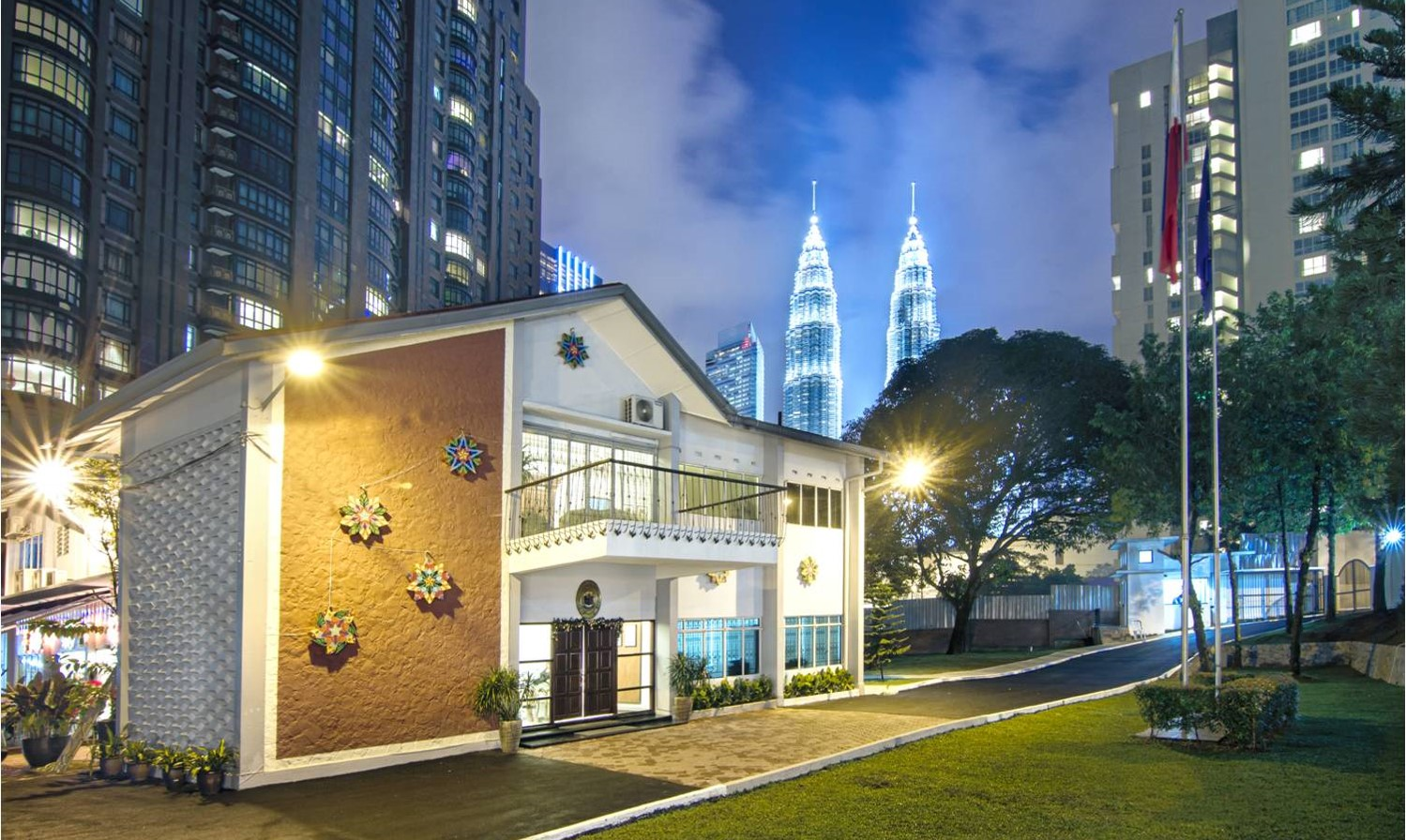
Embassy of the Philippines

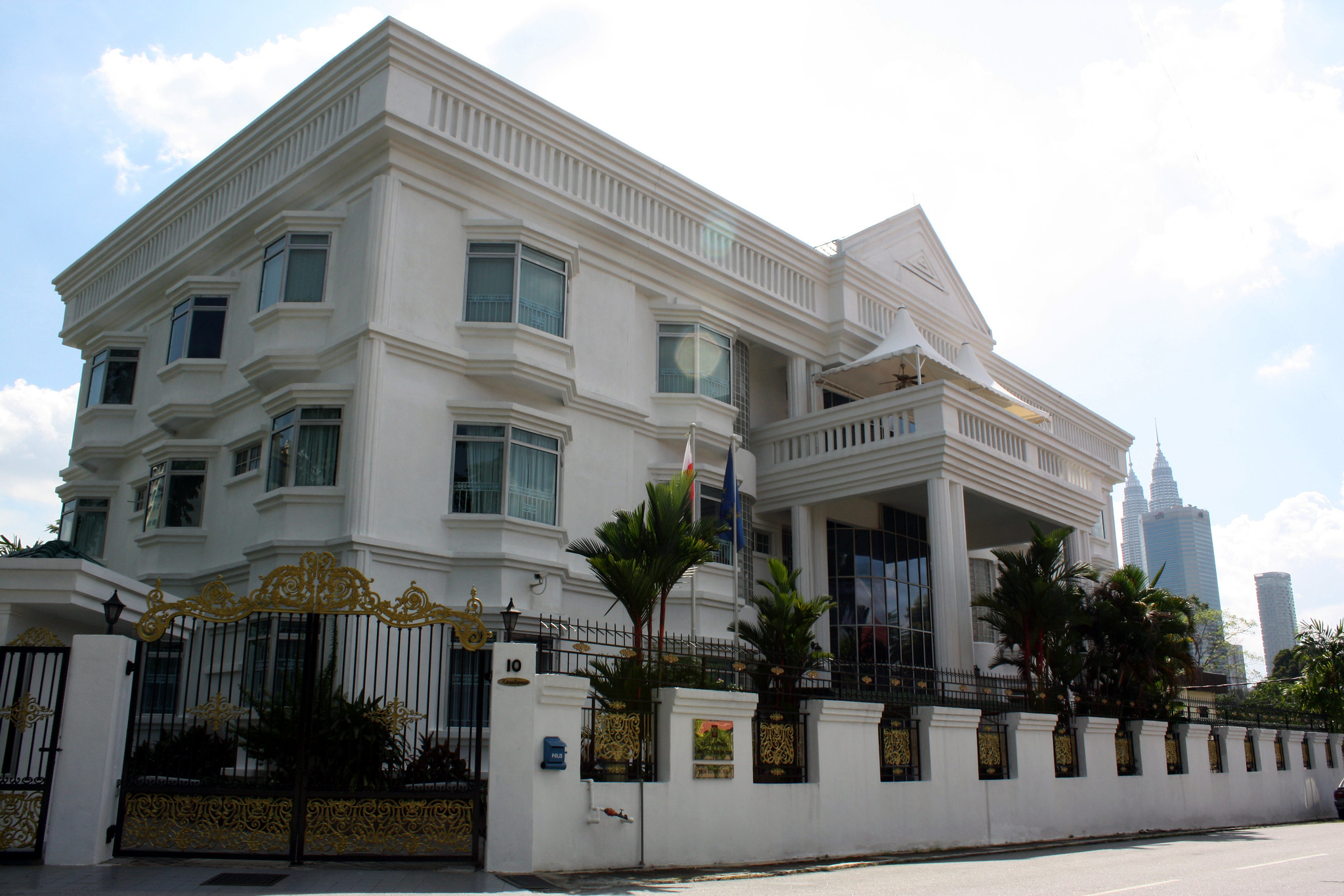
Embassy of Poland

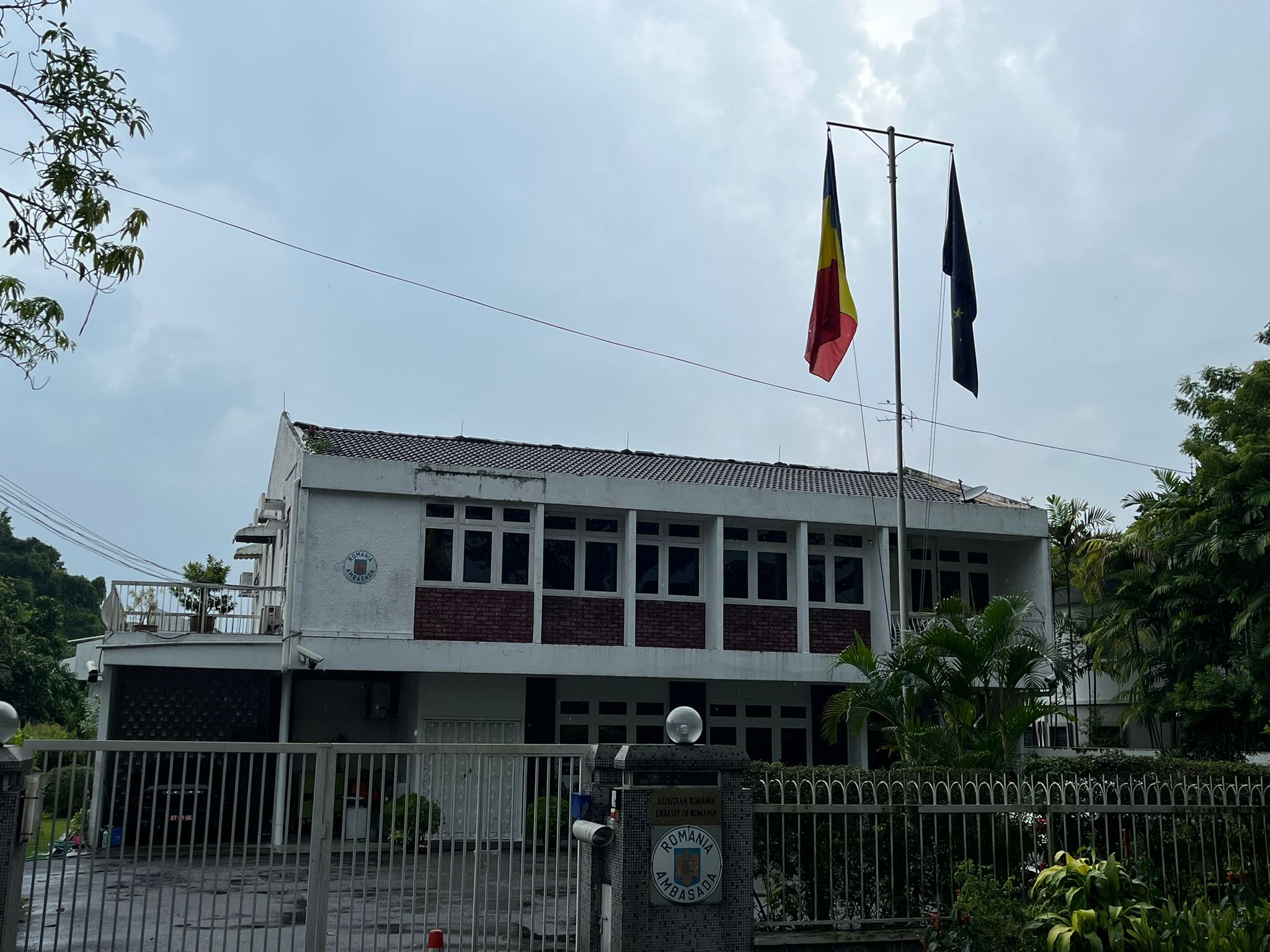
Embassy of Romania

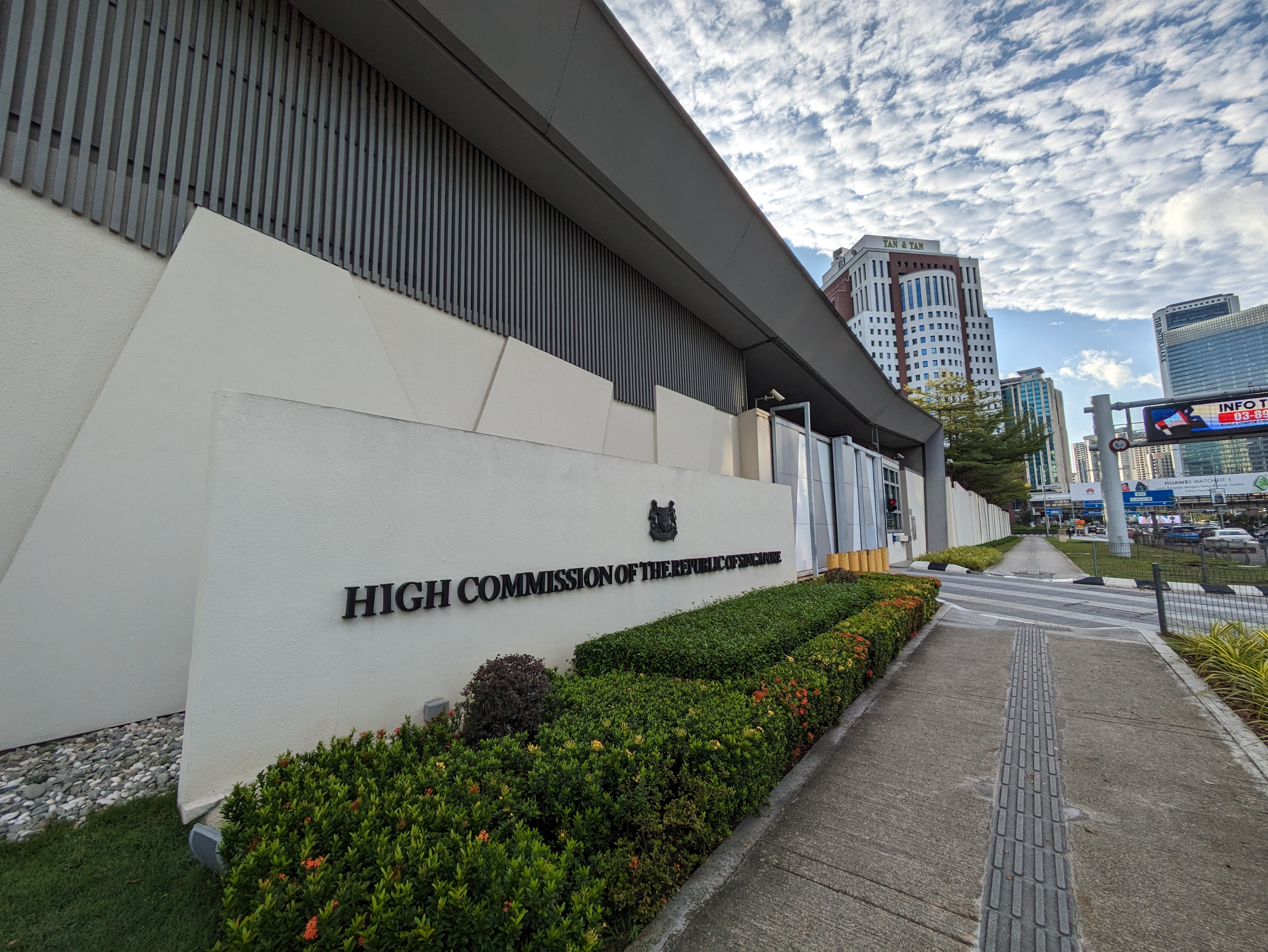
High Commission of Singapore

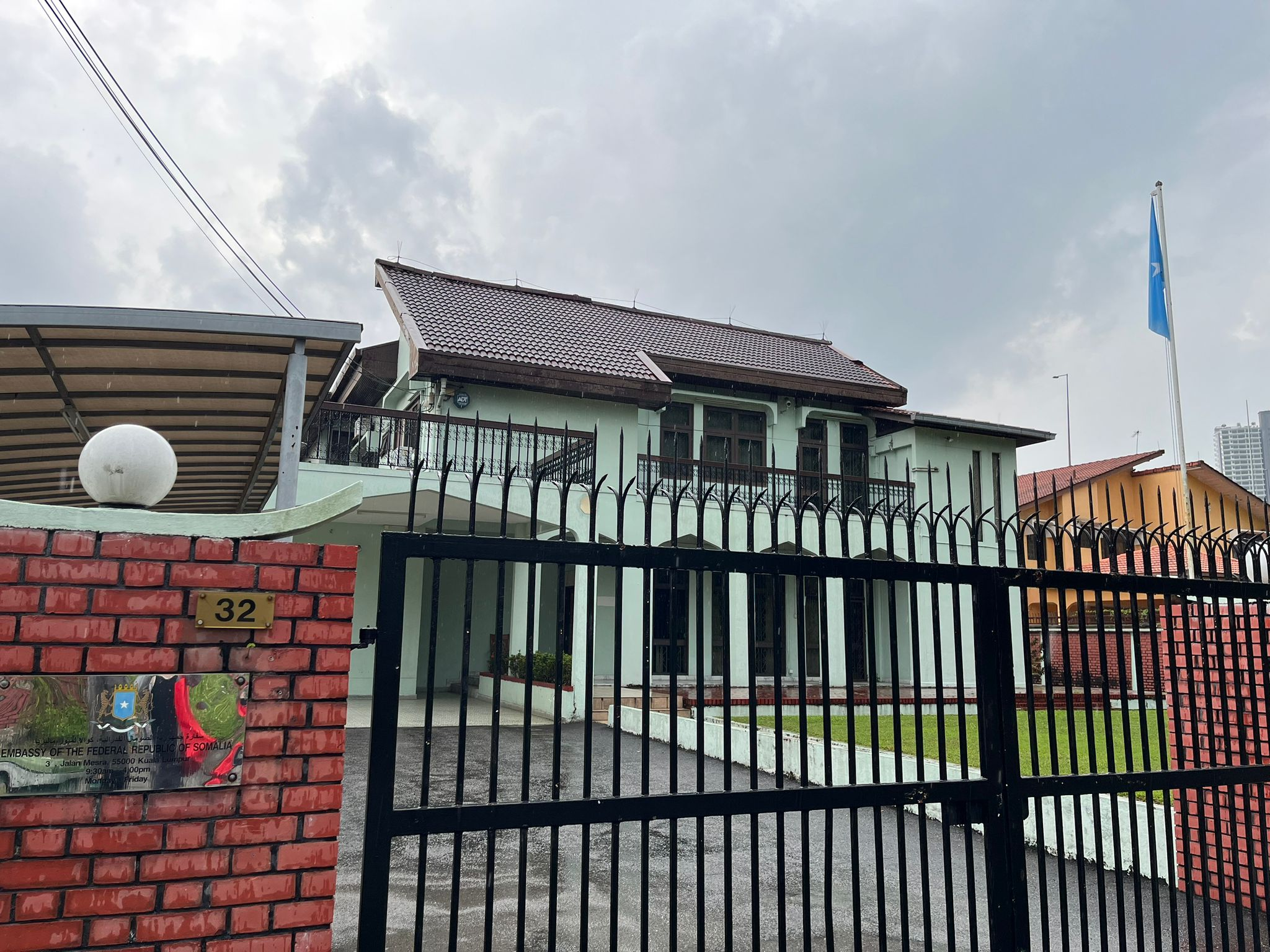
Embassy of Somalia

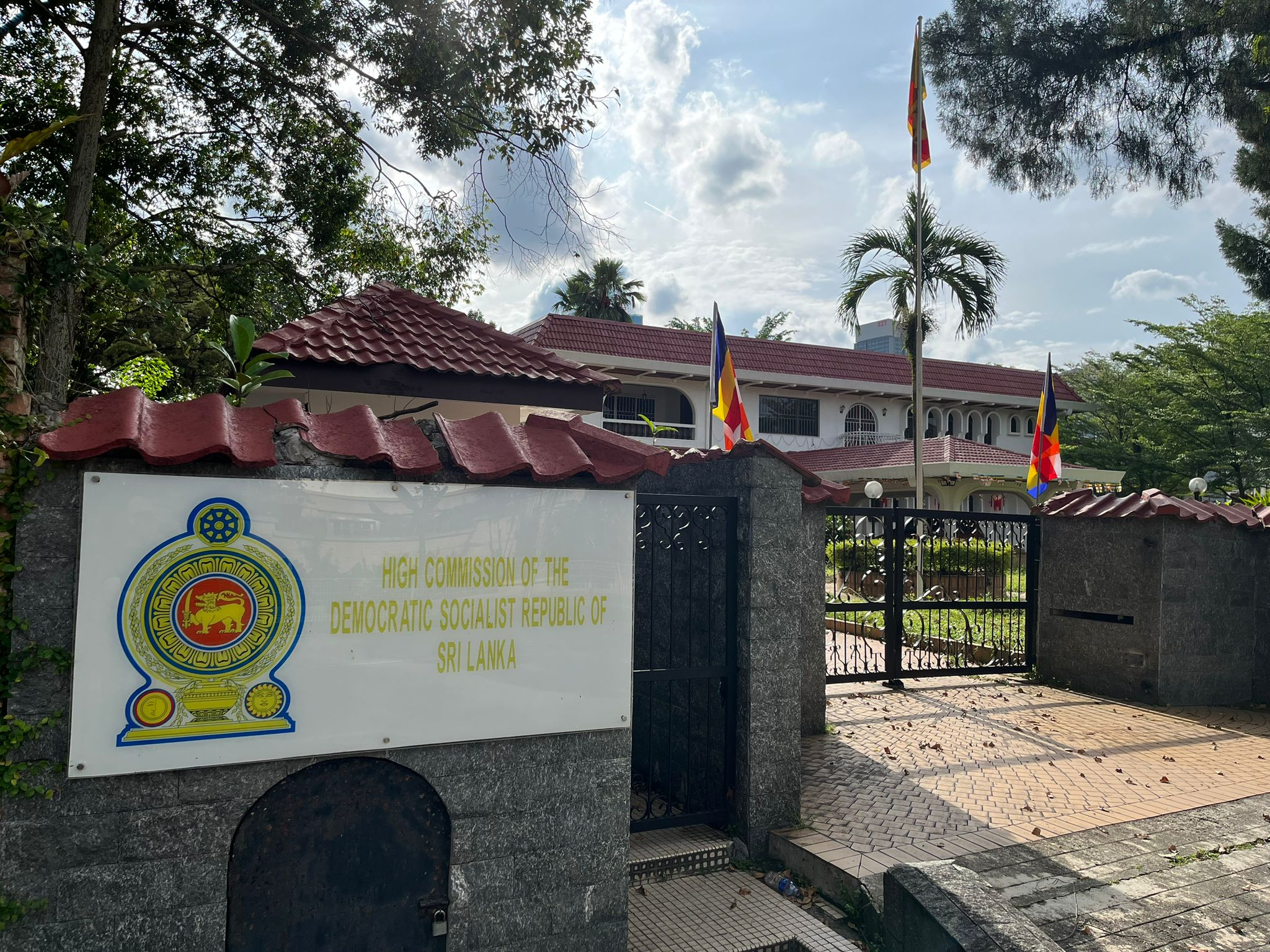
High Commission of Sri Lanka

Embassy of Sweden

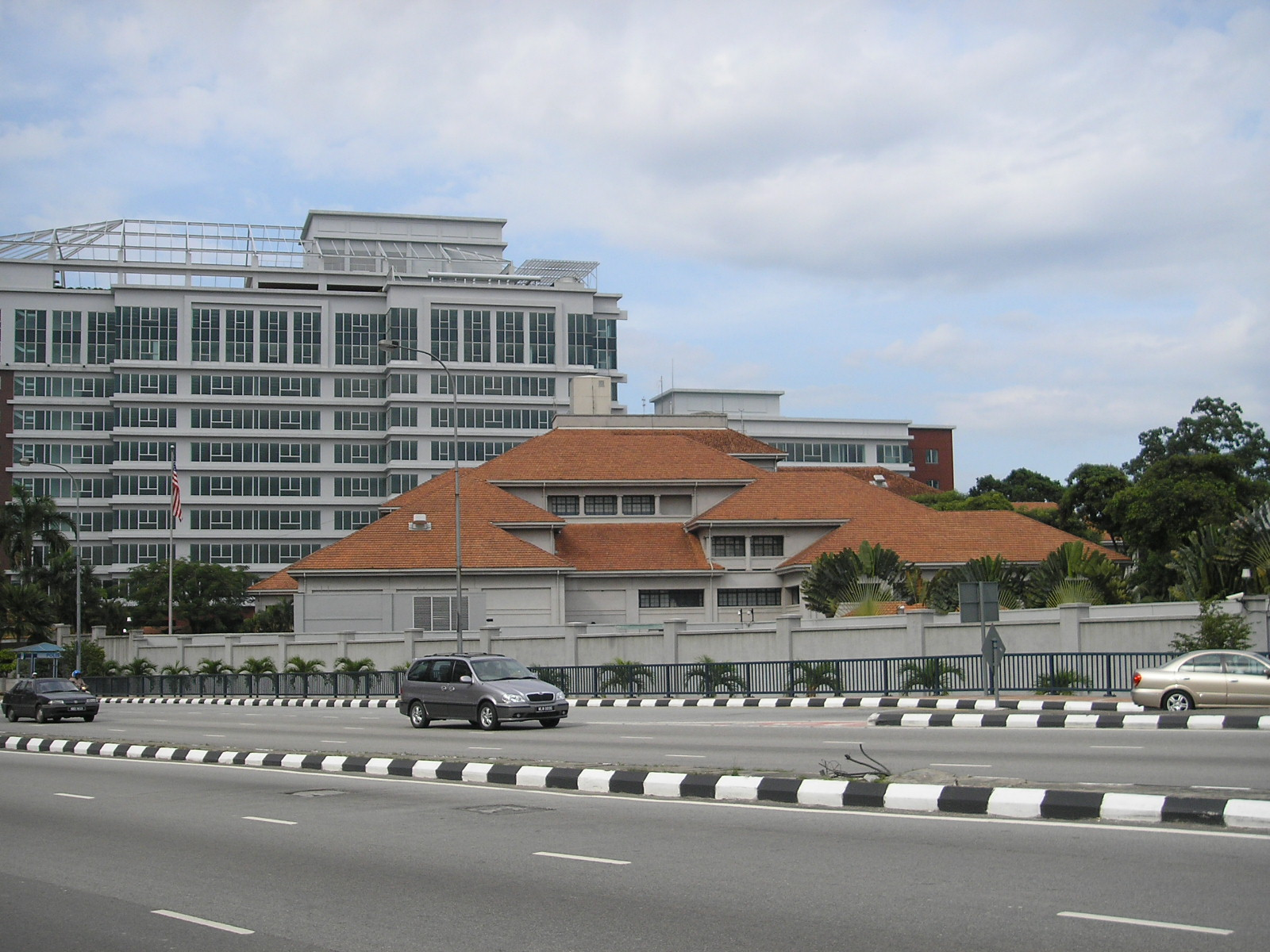
Embassy of the United States

== Consular missions ==
The following cities are host to career consular missions, all of which are consulates-general unless otherwise indicated.

=== Kota Kinabalu, Sabah ===
1. Brunei
2. China
3. Indonesia
4. Japan (Consulate)
5. South Korea (Consulate)

==== Gallery ====
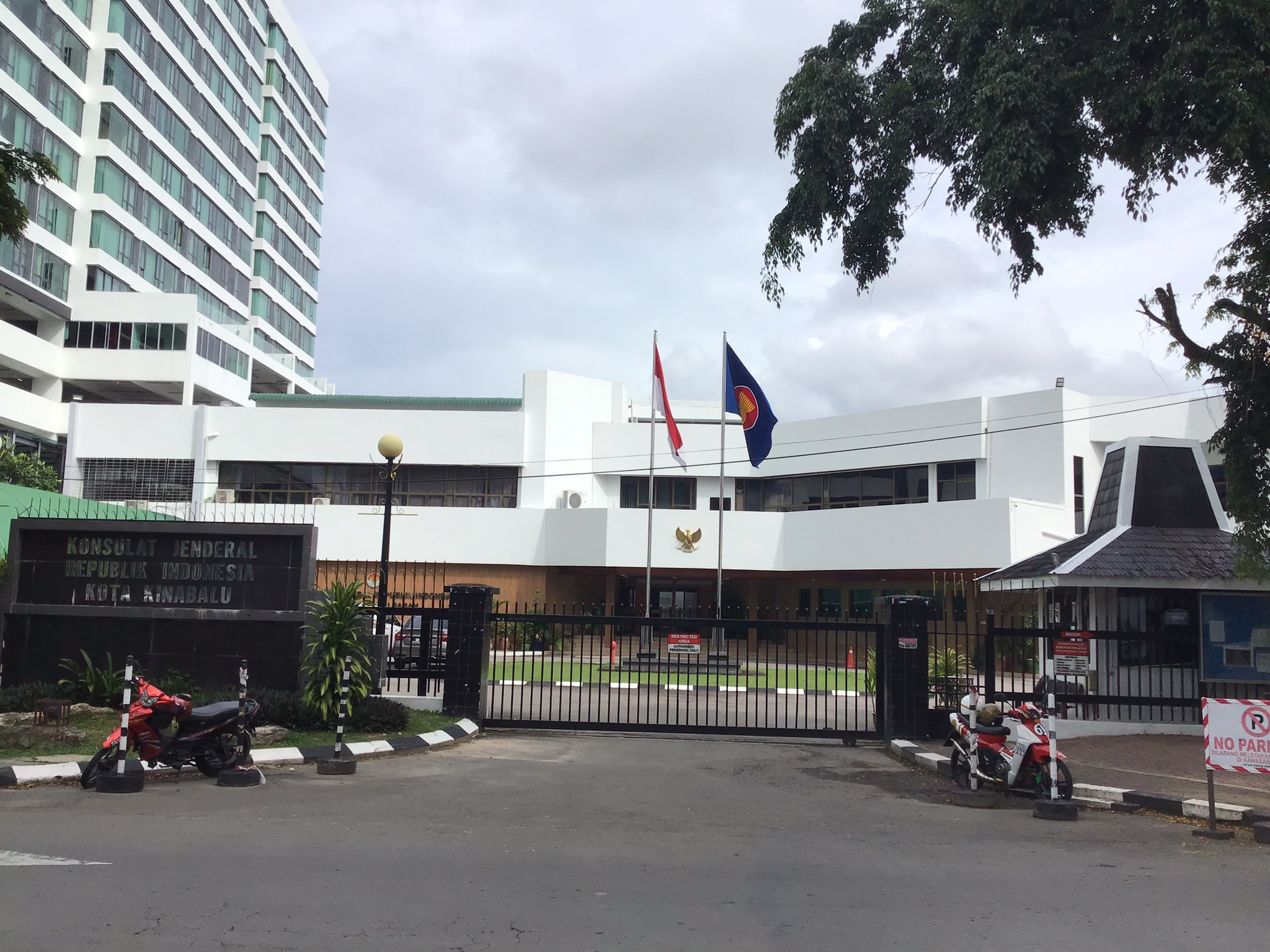
Consulate-General of Indonesia

=== George Town, Penang ===
1. China
2. Indonesia
3. Japan
4. Thailand

==== Gallery ====
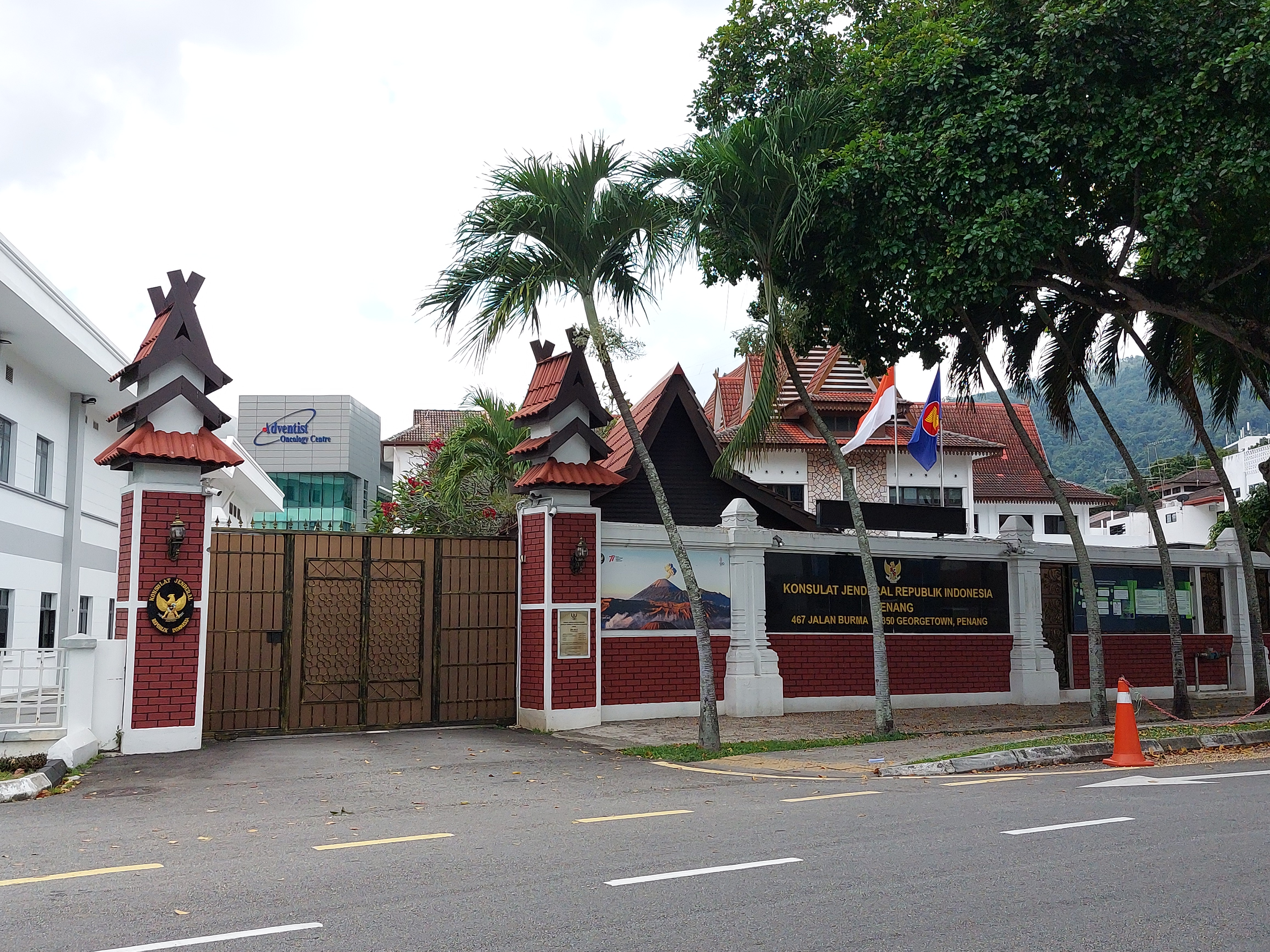
Consulate-General of Indonesia

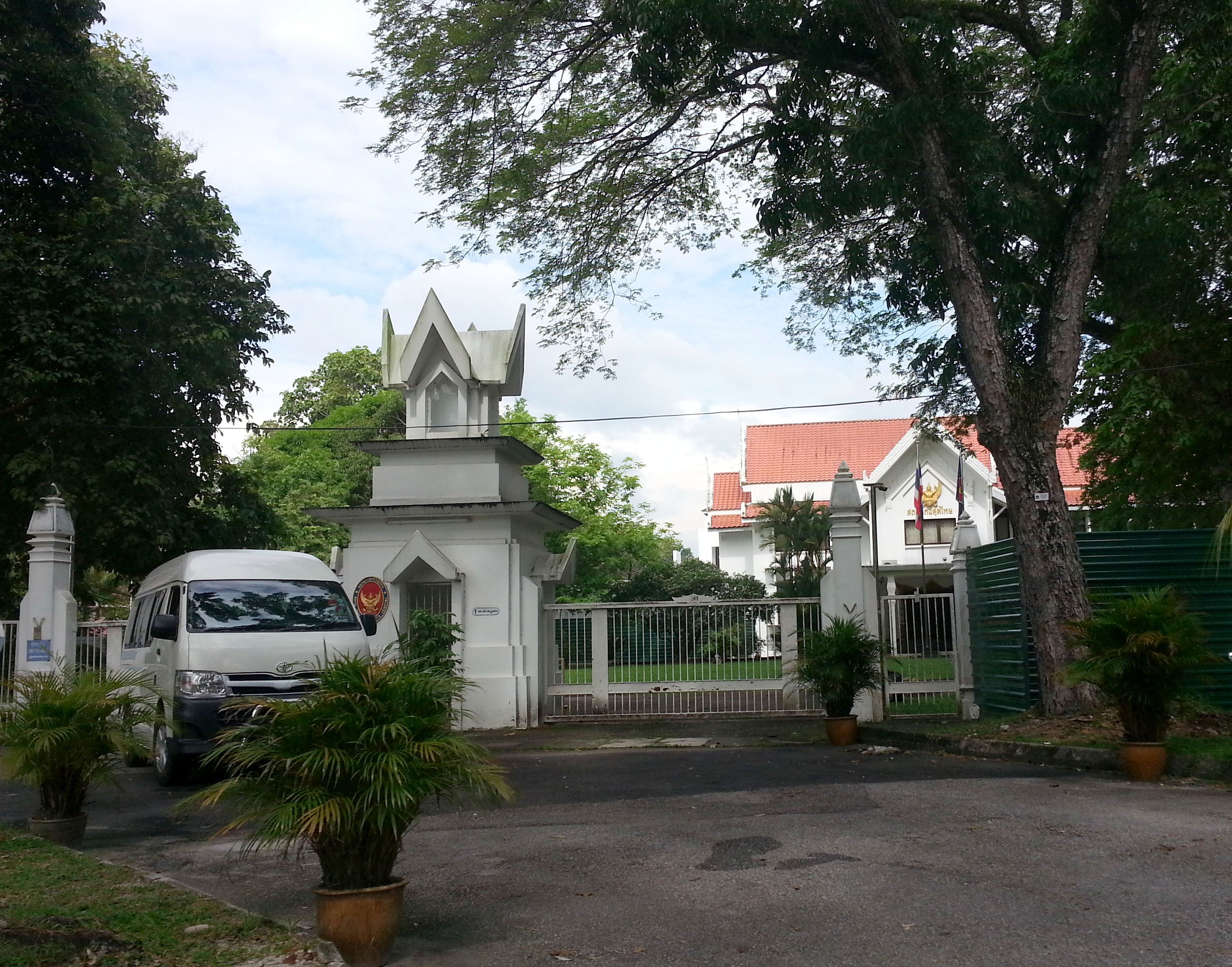
Consulate-General of Thailand

=== Johor Bahru, Johor ===
1. Indonesia
2. Singapore

==== Gallery ====
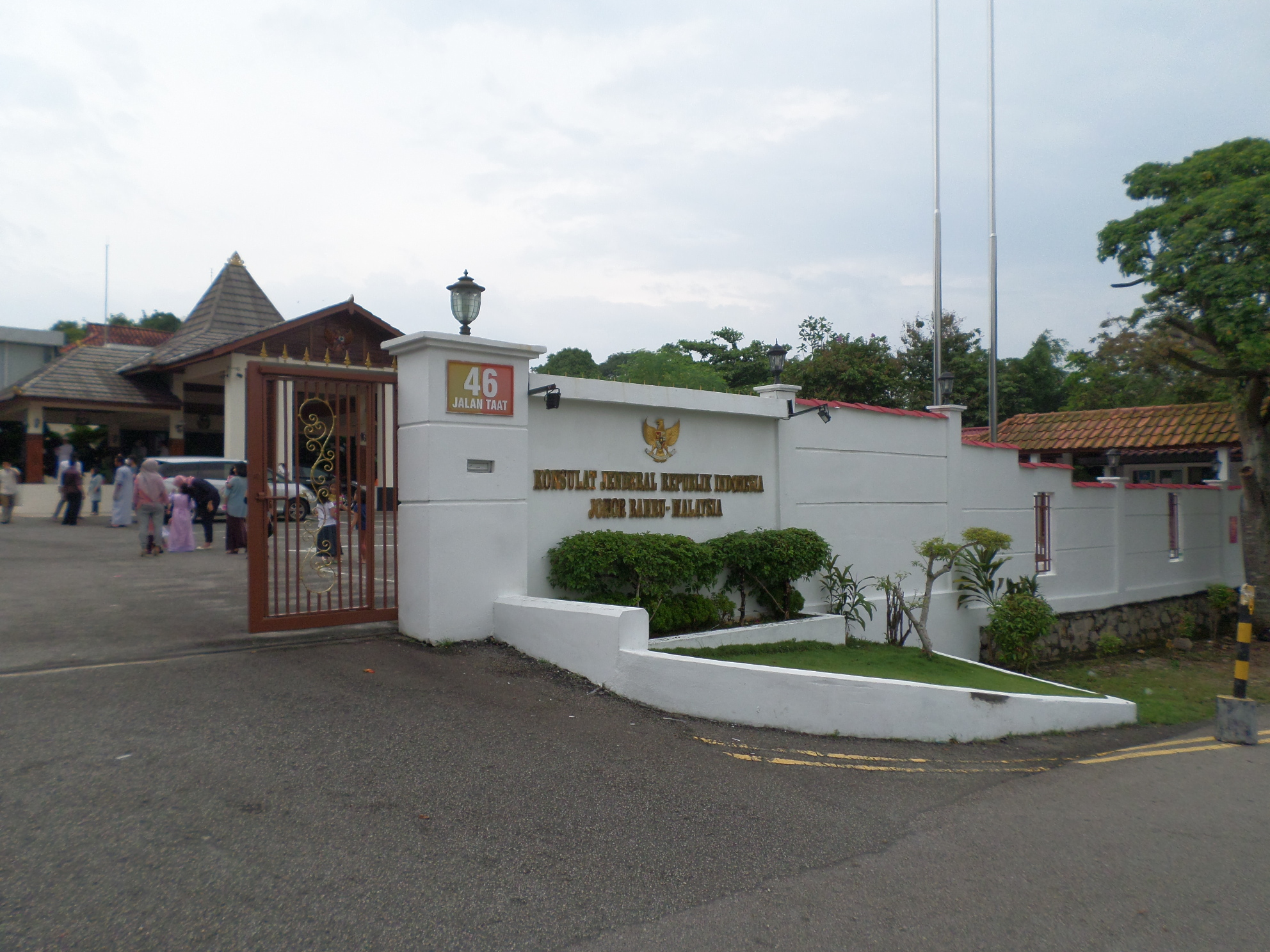
Consulate-General of Indonesia

=== Kota Bharu, Kelantan ===
1. Thailand

=== Kuching, Sarawak ===
1. Brunei
2. China
3. Indonesia

==== Gallery ====
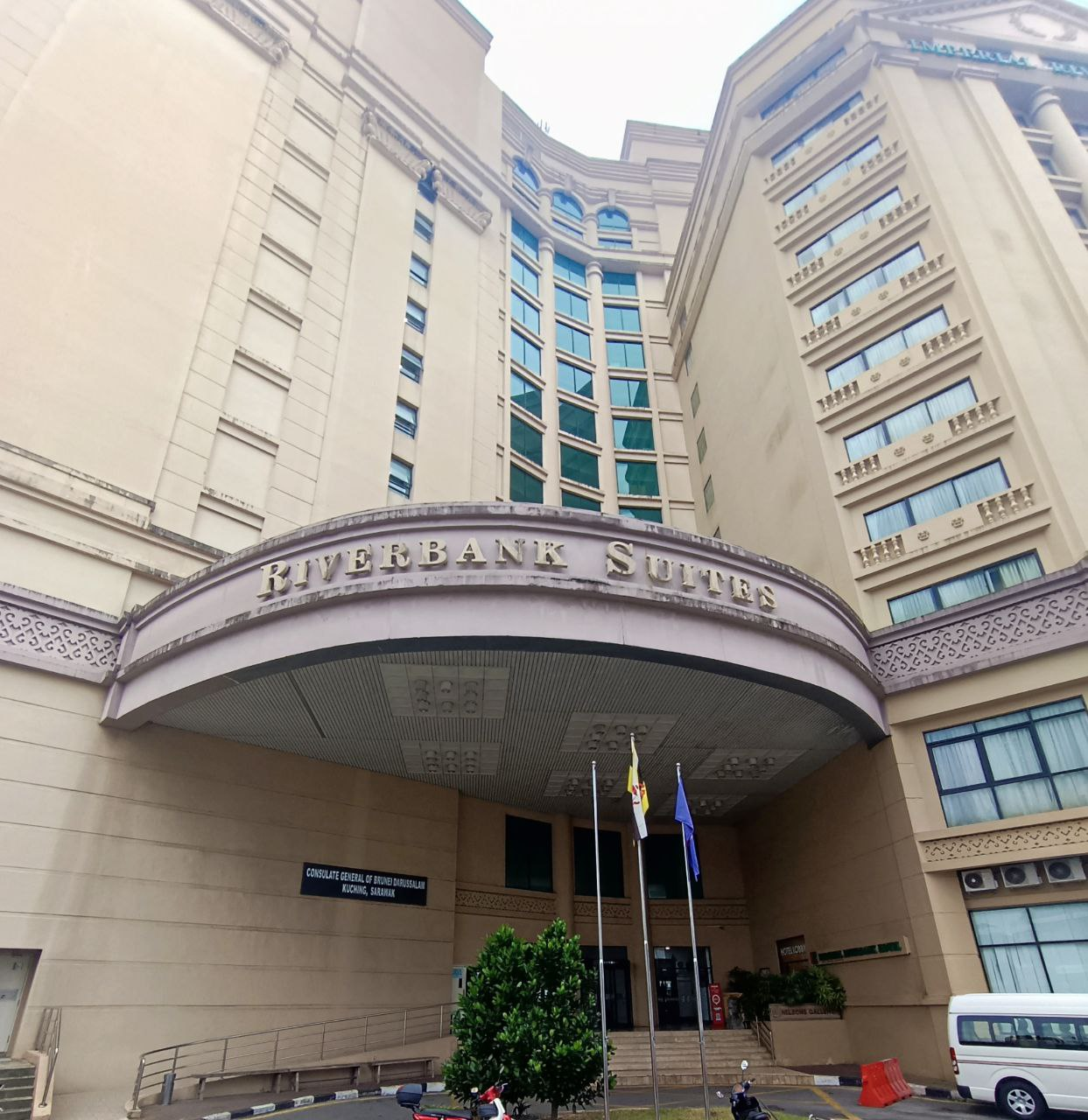
Building hosting the consulate-general of Brunei

=== Tawau, Sabah ===
1. Indonesia (Consulate)

== Non-resident embassies and high commissions accredited to Malaysia ==
=== Resident in Bangkok, Thailand ===
1. Luxembourg
2. Mongolia
3. Portugal

=== Resident in Beijing, China ===
1. Bahamas
2. Botswana
3. Comoros
4. Equatorial Guinea
5. Guinea-Bissau
6. Liberia
7. Malawi
8. Seychelles
9. Sierra Leone
10. South Sudan
11. Trinidad and Tobago

=== Resident in Canberra, Australia ===
1. Samoa
2. Slovenia
3. Tonga

=== Resident in Hanoi, Vietnam ===
1. Angola
2. Haiti
3. Nicaragua
4. Panama

=== Resident in Jakarta, Indonesia ===
1. Armenia
2. Belarus
3. Bulgaria
4. Ethiopia
5. Greece
6. Mauritania
7. Mozambique
8. Serbia
9. Solomon Islands
10. Tunisia

=== Resident in New Delhi, India ===
1. Burkina Faso
2. Congo-Brazzaville
3. Congo-Kinshasa
4. Cyprus
5. Dominican Republic
6. Iceland
7. Jamaica
8. Mali
9. Niger
10. North Macedonia
11. Paraguay

=== Resident in Tokyo, Japan ===
1. Albania
2. Benin
3. Bolivia
4. Djibouti
5. Estonia
6. Gabon
7. Guatemala
8. Madagascar
9. Micronesia
10. Rwanda
11. Togo

=== Resident in other cities ===
1. El Salvador (Seoul)
2. Ivory Coast (Seoul)
3. Latvia (Riga)
4. Lithuania
5. Malta (Valletta)
6. Marshall Islands (Taipei)
7. San Marino (San Marino)

== Closed missions ==
Host city	Sending country	Mission level	Year closed	Ref.
Kuala Lumpur	Albania	Embassy (Note: Resident in Tokyo, Japan)	2014	
Kuala Lumpur	Bolivia	Embassy	Unknown	
Kuala Lumpur	Gambia	High Commission	2020	
Kuala Lumpur	North Korea	Embassy	2021	
Kuala Lumpur	Seychelles	High Commission (Note: Resident in Beijing, China)	Unknown	
Kuala Lumpur	Solomon Islands	High Commission (Note: Resident in Jakarta, Indonesia)	2019	
Johor Bahru	Japan	Consular office	2014	
Kuching	United Kingdom	Consulate-General	1999	

== Missions to open ==
Host city	Sending country	Mission level	Ref.
Putrajaya	Indonesia	Embassy	
Kota Kinabalu	India	Consulate	
Kota Kinabalu	Singapore	Consulate	
Kuching	Singapore	Consulate	

== See also ==
- List of diplomatic missions of Malaysia
- Visa requirements for Malaysian citizens
