= Covington Latin School =

- Covingtonensis Latina Schola
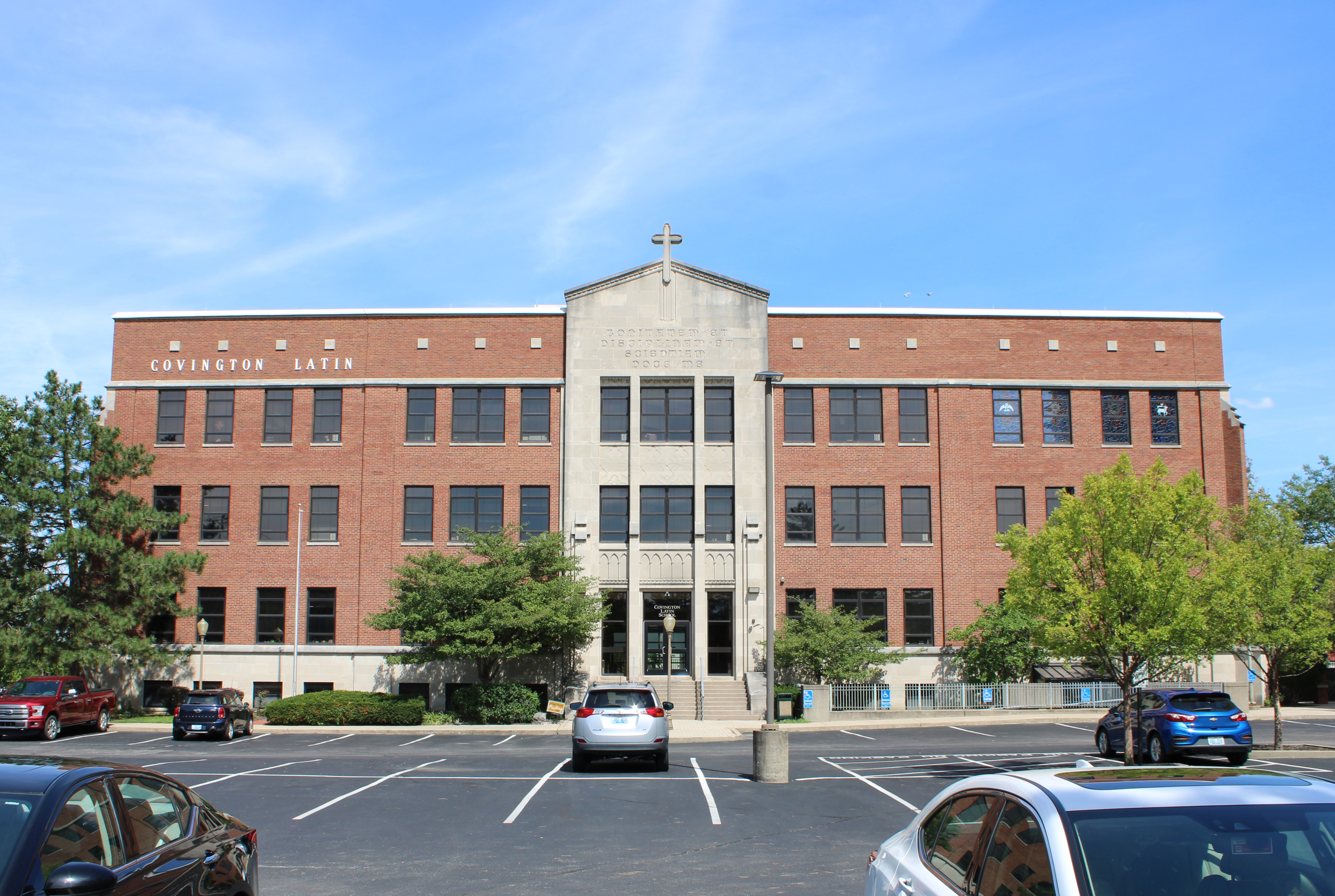
- Covington Latin School in 2023

Location
- 21 East 11th Street; Covington, (Kenton County), Kentucky 41011; United States; 39°4′45″N 84°30′29″W

Information
- Type: Private, Coeducational, college preparatory
- Motto: Bonitatem et disciplinam et scientiam, doce me. ("Teach me goodness, discipline and knowledge.")
- Religious affiliation: Roman Catholic
- Established: 1923
- Founder: Francis Howard
- CEEB code: 180540
- Headmaster: Randy Dennis
- Grades: 7–12
- Student to teacher ratio: 11:1
- Colors: Green and Gold
- Slogan: Achieve here. Excel here. Belong here.
- Nickname: Trojans
- Accreditation: Southern Association of Colleges and Schools
- Publication: Untitled Passages (Literary Magazine)
- Newspaper: The Leader
- Yearbook: The Dardanian
- Website: http://www.covingtonlatin.org

Covington Latin School is a co-educational Catholic college-preparatory high school in Covington, Kentucky, USA, offering a classical education. Since its inception in 1923, the school has operated under the Diocese of Covington; it is located next to the Cathedral Basilica of the Assumption.

== History ==
Covington Latin School was founded in 1923 as a boys' school by Bishop Francis Howard and modeled on the German Gymnasium. It opened in a private house with 15 students. In 1925 it moved to Mother of God School and in November 1926 to the Knights of Columbus hall, an 1877 building that had originally been a Methodist Episcopal and was renovated to house the school. The official dedication of that building took place in March 1927. In 1941 the school replaced it with a three-story purpose-built building on the same site, designed in Gothic style to harmonize with the cathedral. That year there were 170 students.

An expansion of the building that more than doubled its instructional space and included new science classroom and laboratory space, a technology center, a multi-purpose room that can serve as a theatre, and elevator access to both old and new sections was opened on December 7, 2011, the anniversary of the 1941 opening.

Beginning in the late 1930s, the school offered a college-level program called St. Thomas More College in association with Villa Madonna College, a Catholic women's college; this ended in 1945 when Villa Madonna became coeducational (in 1964 it became Thomas More College). Merger discussions with Villa Madonna Academy, a Catholic girls' school, were suggested by the diocese but were unfruitful; instead in 1992–93 Covington Latin School became coeducational on its own (as later did Villa Madonna).

Since 2013, the school has had a system of 14 houses.

== Extracurriculars ==
Covington Latin School is a member of the Kentucky High School Athletic Association and offers athletic teams in:

- Archery
- Baseball
- Basketball
- Cheerleading
- Cross Country
- Diving
- Golf
- Soccer
- Softball
- Swimming
- Tennis
- Track and Field
- Volleyball

Varsity, Junior Varsity, and Freshman teams are offered but vary annually, co-educationally and between sports.

== Notable alumni ==
- David Justice 1982, MLB player
- Christian McDaniel 1993, Kentucky State Senator
- Timothy L. Nolan, Former Judge and Politician
