= Newbury College (United States) =

Defunct private college in Brookline, Massachusetts, U.S.

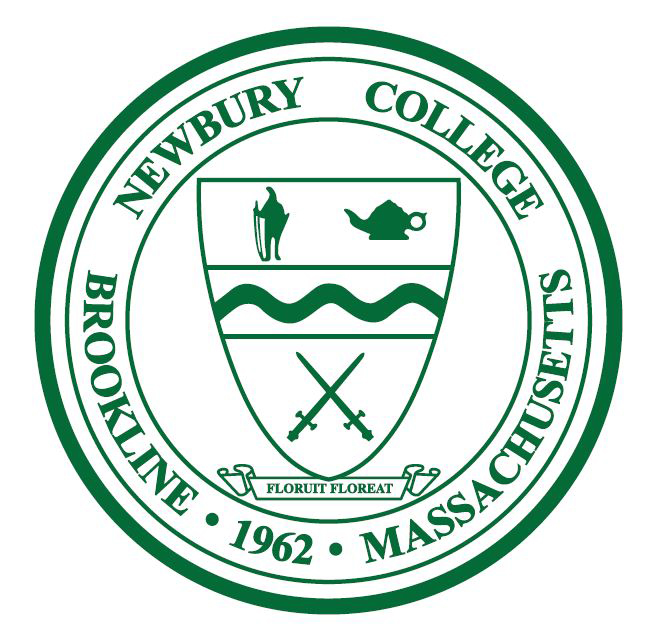
- Motto: Floruit Floreat (Let It Flourish)
- Type: Private college
- Established: 1962
- Academic affiliations: New England Association of Schools and Colleges (NEASC)
- President: Joseph L. Chillo
- Undergraduates: 627 (2018)
- Location: Brookline, Massachusetts, U.S. 42.3311°N 71.1425°W
- Campus: Suburban, 10 acres (4.0 ha)
- Colors: Green and gold
- Nickname: Nighthawks
- Sporting affiliations: NCAA Division III
- Mascot: Nigel the Nighthawk
- Website: https://newbury.edu
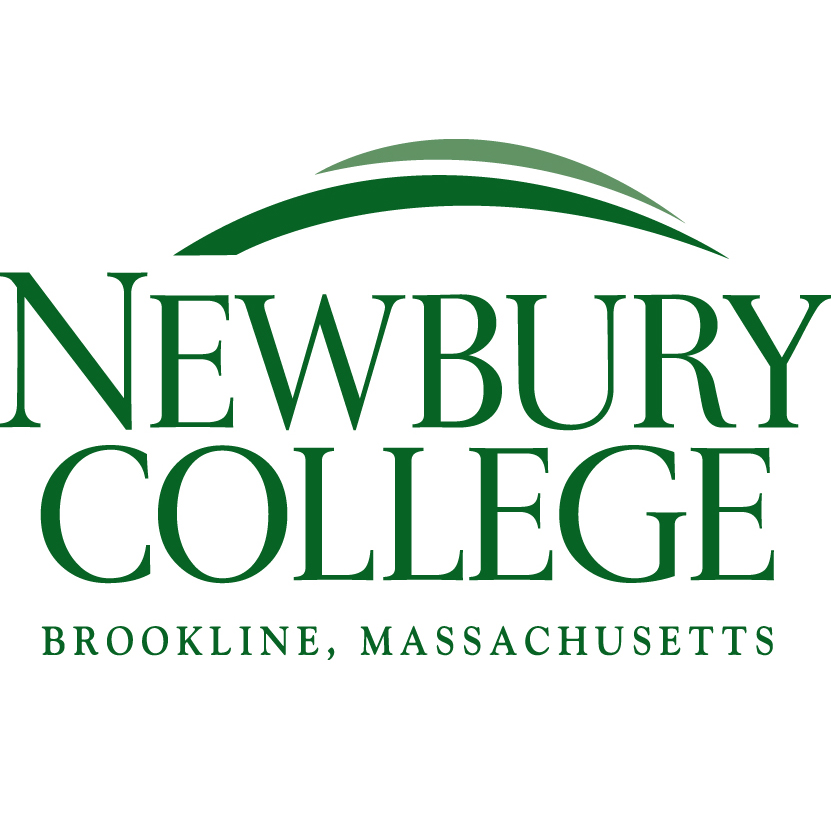

Newbury College was a private college in Brookline, Massachusetts, United States. It was founded in 1962 and closed in 2019. The college was accredited by the New England Association of Schools and Colleges (NEASC) but was placed on probation in June 2018, when its worsening financial standing was determined to pose a potential violation of NEASC's accreditation requirements. Lasell University provides enrollment verifications and copies of transcripts for Newbury alumni.

== History ==
Newbury College was founded in 1962 on Newbury Street in Boston's Back Bay. It was founded as the Newbury School of Business by entrepreneur and educator Edward J. Tassinari. Tassinari's goal in establishing this institution was to help supply local Boston businesses with competent and educated employees.

In the 1960s as the college began to expand, it acquired dormitories on Commonwealth Avenue. In 1968, the Newbury School of Business relocated to Boylston Street, at the former location of Bentley College. Shortly thereafter, in 1971, the school changed its status from a school of business to a junior college. It then began granting associate degrees and officially changed its name to Newbury Junior College.

As the Junior College continued to grow, it began to acquire other schools throughout the Greater Boston area, including Holliston Junior College, Grahm Junior College, and the Boston branch of Bryant & Stratton College, which Newbury acquired in 1975.

In 1973, the school became one of the first colleges in the region to establish satellite campuses. At one point in the 1990s, the college had a total of 15 campus extension sites, located in Arlington, Attleboro, Boston, Braintree/Weymouth, Brookline, Dorchester, Framingham, Hopedale/Milford, Lowell, Lynn, New Bedford, Norwood, Revere, Taunton, and Wakefield.

In 1982, the college purchased and began relocating to the former campus of Cardinal Cushing College in Brookline. As the college acquired buildings in the surrounding area, the satellite campuses began to close, consolidating into the main campus. The school changed its name to Newbury College in 1985, and in 1994, it became a baccalaureate college, offering both associate and bachelor degrees on its Brookline campus.

In the fall of 2015, Newbury renovated the college's library into a 16,000-square-foot "Student Success Center," the campus' first major construction project in more than 20 years.

In December 2018, the college announced it would close at the end of the spring 2019 semester, following several years of declining enrollment. Enrollment had declined from more than 5,300 students to about 600 in the two decades before the school's closure.

== Campus ==
Newbury was situated 3.5 miles (5.6 km) from downtown Boston in the Fisher Hill neighborhood of Brookline, Massachusetts. The 10-acre (4.0 ha) campus consisted of eight buildings, many of which were formerly private residences. As of 2024, a retirement community is being built on the former site of the campus.

== Academics ==
Newbury was a liberal arts college accredited by the Commission on Institution of Higher Education (CIHE) of the New England Association of Schools and Colleges (NEASC), and subsequently by the New England Commission of Higher Education (NECHE).

At the time of its closure, it offered 20 bachelor's degrees and consisted of four schools: The School of Arts & Sciences, The Roger A. Saunders School of Business & Hospitality Management, The School of Applied Science & Human Services, and the School of Professional Studies.

== Enrollment and endowment ==
Newbury had 5,384 enrolled students in 1996; that number fell to 751 in 2016, making a decrease in enrollment of over 86 percent in two decades. This decline was due to the closing of the 15 extension sites, eliminating certificate programs, and concentrating on a baccalaureate degree program, with fewer associate's degrees. Newbury responded by focusing on "practical" majors, such as hospitality, criminal justice, and business. The college also partnered with Regis College in Weston, allowing students to start a master's degree at Regis during their senior year at Newbury.

As of 2018, tuition at Newbury was $33,000 per year, and room and board was approximately $15,000, but the college offered discounted tuition on a case-by-case basis. The average discount at the college was 52 percent. At the time, Newbury had an endowment of $2 million, "tiny even for a school its size."

During the summer of 2018, the college was placed on probation by its accreditor, the Commission on Institutions of Higher Education at the New England Association of Schools and Colleges, over concerns about its finances.

== Athletics ==
Newbury College was a member of Division III of the National Collegiate Athletic Association (NCAA). The Newbury Nighthawks’ 16 athletic programs competed in nine NCAA-sponsored sports including baseball, basketball, cross country, soccer, track & field, softball, lacrosse, and volleyball.

The men's volleyball team won three Eastern College Athletic Conference (ECAC) Division III New England North titles and three national rankings in the 2000s. In 2008, the men's volleyball program was ranked sixth nationally, with a 33–10 record, and finished second in the Northeast Collegiate Volleyball Association (NECVA) Championship Tournament.

The men's basketball team won an ECAC Division III New England title in 2007–08 with a 21–9 record, while the Newbury baseball team earned a trip to the ECAC tournament with 23–22 record in 2012.

The 2014–15 softball team ranked second for the National Fastpitch Coaches Association (NFCA) All-Academic Team Award. The 2015–16 team ranked first for this award, holding a higher GPA than all other NCAA Division I, II, and III teams. The 2016–17 team again ranked first for this award in Division III.
