= Crestview Hills, Kentucky =

- City
- Motto: "A great place to call home!"
- Location of Crestview Hills in Kenton County, Kentucky.
- Coordinates: 39°01′29″N 84°34′10″W
- Country: United States
- State: Kentucky
- County: Kenton

Area
  - Total: 1.93 sq mi (5.00 km^{2})
  - Land: 1.90 sq mi (4.92 km^{2})
  - Water: 0.031 sq mi (0.08 km^{2})
- Elevation: 899 ft (274 m)

Population (2020)
  - Total: 3,246
  - Estimate (2024): 3,338
  - Density: 1,709.0/sq mi (659.83/km^{2})
- Time zone: UTC-5 (Eastern (EST))
  - Summer (DST): UTC-4 (EDT)
- ZIP code: 41017
- Area code: 859
- FIPS code: 21-18442
- GNIS feature ID: 2404154
- Website: https://www.crestviewhills.gov/

Crestview Hills is a home rule-class city in Kenton County, Kentucky, in the United States. It is a suburb in the Greater Cincinnati area. The population was 3,246 at the 2020 census.

Crestview Hills is located in Northern KY. Interstate 275 travels through the city. Interstate 71/75 lies close to the city border. It is the home of Thomas More University.

== Geography ==
According to the United States Census Bureau, the city has a total area of 1.9 square miles (4.9 km^{2}), all land. Its neighborhoods include: Lookout Farm, Old Crestview Hills, College Park, and Summit Lakes. Grandview Summit and Valley View apartments are also within Crestview Hills.

== Government ==
The City of Crestview Hills is governed by a mayor and six city council members. Additionally, the City of Crestview Hills is staffed by a City Administrator, Finance Officer/Treasurer, City Attorney, City Clerk, City Engineer and Public Works Director. Elections for council members are held every even numbered year and the mayor is elected every four years.

The current mayor of Crestview Hills is Paul Meier.

== Demographics ==
Historical population
Census	Pop.	Note	%±
1960	15		—
1970	1,114		7,326.7%
1980	1,362		22.3%
1990	2,546		86.9%
2000	2,889		13.5%
2010	3,148		9.0%
2020	3,246		3.1%
2024 (est.)	3,338		2.8%
U.S. Decennial Census

=== 2020 census ===
As of the 2020 census, Crestview Hills had a population of 3,246. The median age was 45.0 years. 14.1% of residents were under the age of 18 and 27.3% of residents were 65 years of age or older. For every 100 females there were 93.4 males, and for every 100 females age 18 and over there were 90.6 males age 18 and over.

100.0% of residents lived in urban areas, while 0.0% lived in rural areas.

There were 1,347 households in Crestview Hills, of which 20.3% had children under the age of 18 living in them. Of all households, 44.4% were married-couple households, 17.7% were households with a male householder and no spouse or partner present, and 33.3% were households with a female householder and no spouse or partner present. About 38.2% of all households were made up of individuals and 20.8% had someone living alone who was 65 years of age or older.

There were 1,450 housing units, of which 7.1% were vacant. The homeowner vacancy rate was 1.1% and the rental vacancy rate was 9.7%.

Racial composition as of the 2020 census
Race	Number	Percent
White	2,887	88.9%
Black or African American	148	4.6%
American Indian and Alaska Native	2	0.1%
Asian	45	1.4%
Native Hawaiian and Other Pacific Islander	3	0.1%
Some other race	32	1.0%
Two or more races	129	4.0%
Hispanic or Latino (of any race)	82	2.5%

=== 2010 census ===
As of the census of 2010, there were 3,148 people, 1,388 households, and 756 families residing in the city. The population density was 1,503.1 inhabitants per square mile (580.4/km^{2}). There were 1,463 housing units at an average density of 654.0 per square mile (252.5/km^{2}). The racial makeup of the city was 95.5% White, 2.1% African American, 0.1% Native American, 1.0% Asian, 0.3% Pacific Islander, 0.2% from other races, and 0.90% from two or more races. Hispanic or Latino of any race were 0.52% of the population.

There were 1,388 households, out of which 17.7% had children under the age of 18 living with them, 43.0% were married couples living together, 7.6% had a female householder with no husband present, and 45.5% were non-families. 39.5% of all households were made up of individuals, and 20.3% had someone living alone who was 65 years of age or older. The average household size was 2.07 and the average family size was 2.79.

In the city the population was spread out, with 23.6% under the age of 18, 8.2% from 18 to 24, 19% from 25 to 44, 26.9% from 45 to 64, and 22% who were 65 years of age or older. The median age was 44.3 years. For every 100 females, there were 89.3 males. For every 100 females age 18 and over, there were 85.6 males.

=== Income and poverty ===
The median income for a household in the city was $71,696, and the median income for a family was $97,368. Males had a median income of $73,654 versus $56,414 for females. The per capita income for the city was $45,549. About 2.5% of families and 5.1% of the population were below the poverty line, including 11.1% of those age 65 or over.

== Education ==
Crestview Hills is home to Thomas More University, founded in 1921 by the Benedictine Sisters as Villa Madonna College. Serving over 2,000 students, the college is ranked by Money Magazine as one of the "Best College Buys" in higher education and by the Carnegie Foundation, which praises the college as a "selective liberal arts college." Thomas More was also ranked as one of the Best Colleges (Regional Universities – South) by U.S. News & World Report for 2014.

As a part of Crestview Hills, Thomas More University is an important partner in the community by offering a variety of education and social outreach opportunities for residents. Recent programs have included Division III sporting events, theater productions, music concerts and guest speakers. Thomas More also offers non-traditional students the ability to earn their MBA degree through an evening program that allows learners to continue working during the day.

Thomas More University offers its students and the community the chance to see the stars with the Thomas More Observatory. The observatory routinely offers open house events where the public can attend a lecture followed by a night sky viewing.

Crestview Hills is also located in the Kenton County School District and also has a variety of nearby private school options available to residents.

== Economy ==
Crestview Hills offers approximately 1,877,374 square foot of commercial office space, with the largest contributor coming from the expansive Thomas More Office Park. Businesses with headquarters in Crestview Hills include:

- Columbia Sussex Corporation
- Waltz Business Systems
- Flottman Company
- FUSIONWRX Inc, a Flottman Company
- Whitehorse Freight

Other major employers in the area have also begun expanding into the Office Park including Cincinnati Children's Hospital Medical Center, and St. Elizabeth Healthcare. Crestview Hills is home to the Crestview Hills Town Center, which features many retail shops in their outdoor lifestyle shopping center, including Trader Joe's and Dillard's.
