= Ferdinand Brossart =

American Catholic bishop (1849–1930)

His Excellency, The Right Reverend Ferdinand Brossart
- Bishop of Covington
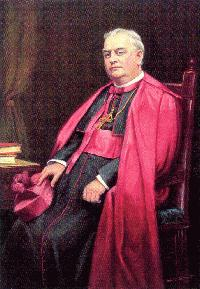
- Church: Catholic Church
- Diocese: Diocese of Covington
- Appointed: December 9, 1915
- Term ended: March 2, 1923
- Predecessor: Camillus Paul Maes
- Successor: Francis William Howard

Orders
- Ordination: September 1, 1892 by Camillus Paul Maes
- Consecration: Januar 25, 1916 by Henry Moeller

Personal details
- Born: October 14, 1849 Büchlberg, Kingdom of Bavaria (now Germany)
- Died: August 6, 1930 (aged 80) Melbourne, Kentucky, U.S.
- Education: St. Francis Seminary; Mount Saint Mary Seminary; American College at Louvain
- Motto: Sectare caritatem (Follow charity)

Styles of Ferdinand Brossart
- Reference style: His Excellency; The Most Reverend
- Spoken style: Your Excellency
- Religious style: Bishop

Ferdinand Brossart was a German American prelate of the Roman Catholic Church. He served from 1915 to 1923 as the fourth bishop of the Diocese of Covington in Kentucky.

== Early life ==
Ferdinand Brossart was born on October 19, 1849, in the village of Buechelberg, Rhenish Palatinate, in what was then the Kingdom of Bavaria. Today, it is a part of the city Woerth am Rhein in Germany. His parents, Ferdinand Brossart and Catharina née Diesel, were farmers.

The Brossart family immigrated to the United States when Ferdinand was two years old. They first settled in New Orleans, Louisiana, but moved to Cincinnati, Ohio, after an outbreak of yellow fever in New Orleans. In 1861, the family moved to Campbell County, Kentucky.

Choosing to become a priest, Brossart studied at St. Francis Seminary in Springfield Township, Ohio, Mount Saint Mary Seminary in Cincinnati, and the American College at Louvain in Leuven, Belgium.

== Priesthood ==
Brossart was ordained a priest for the Diocese of Covington by Bishop Augustus Toebbe on September 1, 1872, in Covington, Ohio. During a smallpox epidemic in Covington, Brossart attended the sick and dying at the cost of his own health. Bishop Camillus Maes named Brossart as his vicar general and rector of St. Mary's Cathedral in 1888. Brossart celebrated the 25th anniversary of this ordination while on a pilgrimage to the Sanctuary of Our Lady of Lourdes in Lourdes, France.

== Bishop of Covington ==
Brossart was appointed bishop of Covington by Pope Benedict XV on December 9, 1915. He was consecrated at St. Mary's Cathedral in Covington by Archbishop Henry Moeller of Cincinnati on January 25, 1916. Brossart is the only diocesan priest from Covington to have been chosen as bishop.

As bishop, Brossart completed the final work on the Cathedral of the Assumption in Covington. After the entry of the United States to the First World War in 1917, Brossart suffered many public attacks because he was born in what was now the German Empire. In response, he declared his loyalty to the United States and engaged in many patriotic activities. He also decreed that only Latin and English could be used in services. Brossart also translated several German theological books into English, including works of the Austrian monk Henry Denifle.

== Retirement and legacy ==
Brossart resigned as bishop of Covington on March 14, 1923, due to ill health. He retired to the St. Anne Convent in Melbourne, Kentucky, where he died on August 6, 1930.

Bishop Brossart High School in Alexandria, Kentucky, was named after him in 1962.

== Episcopal succession ==
Catholic Church titles
Preceded by Camillus Paul Maes	Bishop of Covington; 1915—1923	Succeeded by Francis William Howard
