= Robert William Muench =

American prelate

His Excellency, The Most Reverend Robert William Muench
- Bishop Emeritus of Baton Rouge
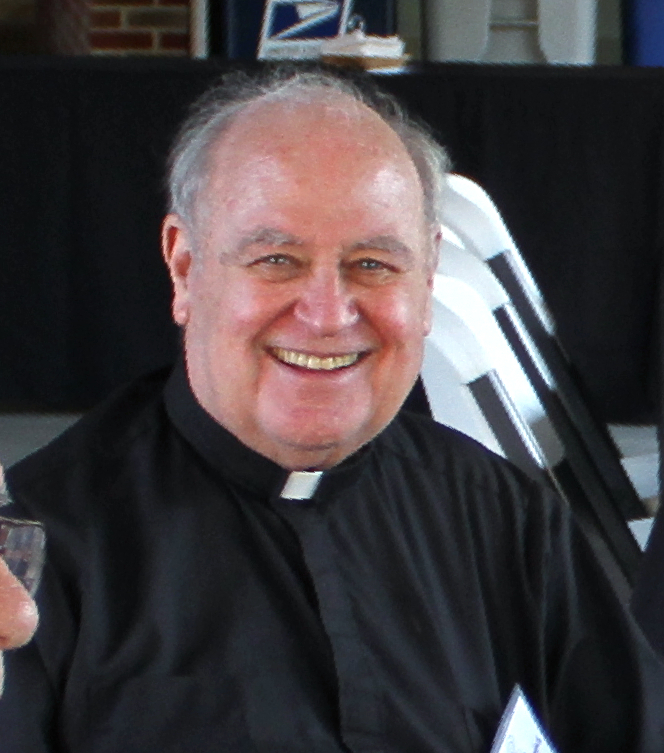
- Munch in 2022
- Diocese: Baton Rouge
- Appointed: December 15, 2001
- Installed: March 14, 2002
- Retired: June 26, 2018
- Predecessor: Alfred Clifton Hughes
- Successor: Michael Duca
- Previous posts: Bishop of Covington (1996-2002); Auxiliary Bishop of New Orleans and Titular Bishop of Mactaris (1990-1996)

Orders
- Ordination: May 18, 1968 by Philip Matthew Hannan
- Consecration: June 29, 1990 by Francis B. Schulte, Philip Hannan, and John Favalora

Personal details
- Born: December 28, 1942 (age 83) Louisville, Kentucky, US
- Denomination: Roman Catholic Church
- Parents: William Anthony and Mary Kathryn (née Allgeier) Muench
- Education: Notre Dame Seminary; Catholic University of America
- Motto: Jesus must increase

Styles of Robert William Muench
- Reference style: His Excellency; The Most Reverend
- Spoken style: Your Excellency
- Religious style: Bishop

Robert William Muench (born December 28, 1942) is an American prelate of the Roman Catholic Church. Muench served as bishop of the Diocese of Baton Rouge in Louisiana from 2002 to 2018. He previously served as bishop of the Diocese of Covington in Kentucky from 1996 to 2002 and as an auxiliary bishop of the Archdiocese of New Orleans in Louisiana from 1990 to 1996.

== Biography ==
=== Early life ===
Robert Muench was born on December 28, 1942, in Louisville, Kentucky, to William Anthony and Mary Kathryn (née Allgeier) Muench; he has three sisters, Jo Ann, Mary Alice, and Marsha. When he was age three, the family moved to New Orleans, Louisiana. Muench attended Jefferson Davis and St. Leo the Great primary schools in New Orleans.

In 1956, Muench entered Saint Joseph Seminary in Saint Benedict, Louisiana. He graduated from the high school and junior college program in 1962. He then attended Notre Dame Seminary in New Orleans, receiving a Bachelor of Arts degree in philosophy in 1964.

From 1964 to 1968, Muench studied at the Catholic University of America in Washington, D.C., earning a Master of Education degree and completing his seminary studies. He also attended courses at Loyola University New Orleans and the University of New Orleans.

=== Priesthood ===
On May 18, 1968, Muench was ordained to the priesthood at Saint Louis Cathedral in New Orleans by Archbishop Philip Hannan for the Archdiocese of New Orleans. After his ordination, the archdiocese assigned Muench to the faculty of St. John Vianney Preparatory School in New Orleans. He worked there until 1977, serving as religion teacher, liturgy director, guidance counselor, and eventually rector. Muench also assisted at various parishes in New Orleans. In 1976, he was named associate pastor of St. Matthias Parish in New Orleans, later becoming pastor.

In 1977, Hannan named Muench as vicar for Christian formation, then moved him in 1981 to director of vocations. In 1983, Muench was named director of the Pope John XXIII House for Vocation Discernment and executive assistant to Archbishop Hannan. The Vatican elevated Muench to the rank of honorary prelate of his holiness in 1985. Archbishop Francis B. Schulte named Muench as his vicar general in 1989 and moderator of the curia in 1990.

=== Auxiliary Bishop of New Orleans ===
On May 8, 1990, Pope John Paul II appointed Muench as an auxiliary bishop of New Orleans and titular bishop of Mactaris. He was consecrated on June 29, 1990, at Saint Louis Cathedral in by Schulte, with Hannan and Bishop John Favalora serving as co-consecrators. Muench selected as his episcopal motto, "Jesus Must Increase" John 3:30.

=== Bishop of Covington ===
On January 5, 1996, John Paul II appointed Muench as the ninth bishop of Covington. He was installed on March 19, 1995, at the Cathedral Basilica of the Assumption in Covington, Kentucky.

Muench served as a board member of St. Elizabeth Medical Center in Northern Kentucky and chancellor of Thomas More College in Crestview Hills, Kentucky. He was a member of the Committee on Priestly Formation within the United States Conference of Catholic Bishops (USCCB). He also initiated renovations of the Cathedral Basilica of the Assumption

=== Bishop of Baton Rouge ===
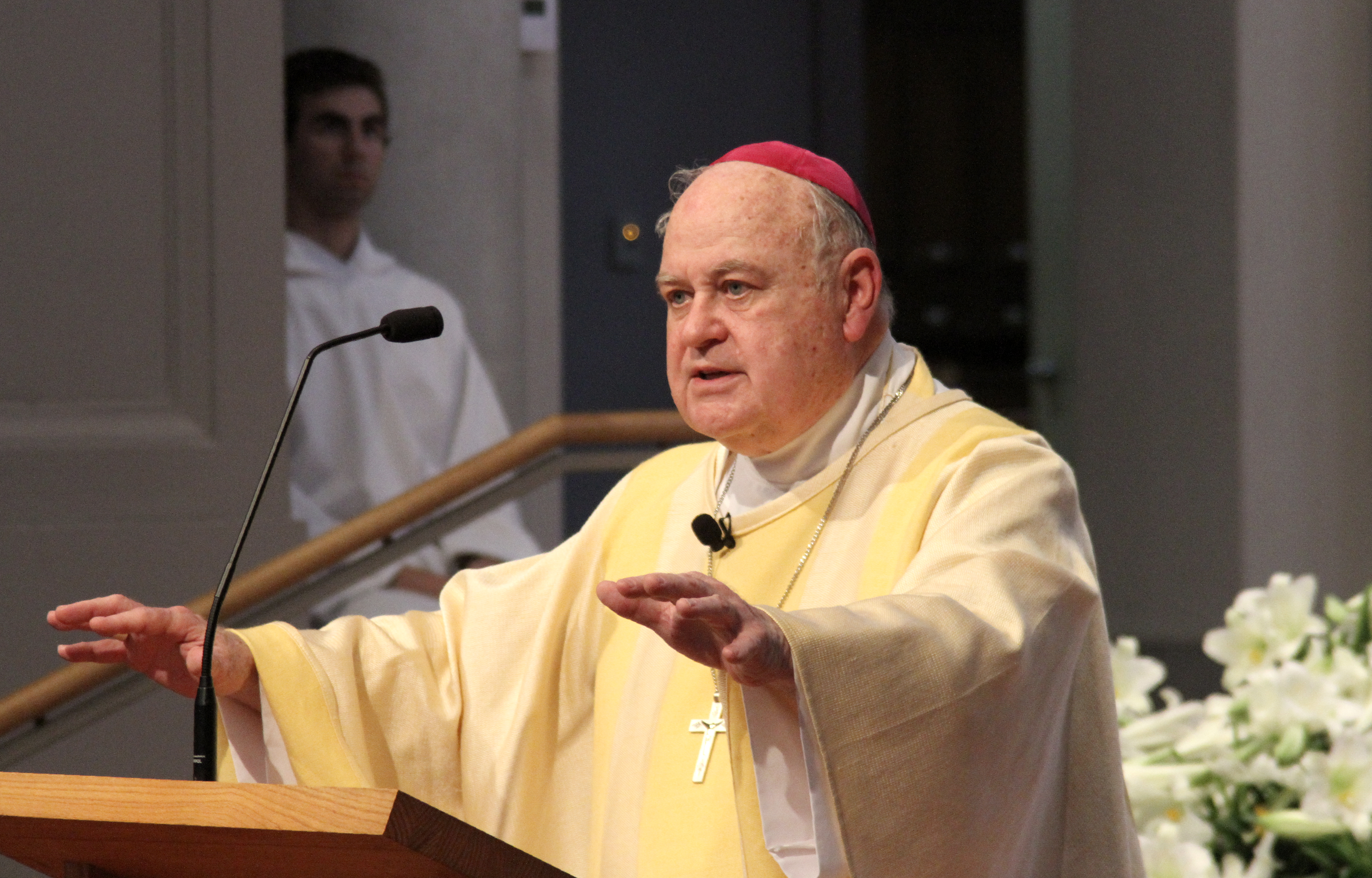
Bishop Muench (2018)

On December 15, 2001, John Paul II appointed Muench as the fifth bishop of Baton Rouge. He was installed at St. Joseph Cathedral in Baton Rouge on March 14, 2002, with Archbishop Alfred Hughes presiding. Muench also served on the board of trustees of Notre Dame Seminary in New Orleans and Saint Joseph Seminary College.

On November 12, 2004, the Diocese of Baton Rouge settled a sexual abuse lawsuit brought by a Baton Rouge man. The plaintiff claimed that the late Bishop Joseph Sullivan had abused him when the man was 17 years old in 1975. Muench authorized the settlement, calling the accusations credible. He promised to rename the Bishop Sullivan High School before the next school term. Following Hurricane Katrina in 2005, Muench joined Hughes and Louisiana Governor Kathleen Blanco in a televised appearance declaring a day of prayer for the state of Louisiana.

=== Retirement ===
On June 26, 2018, Pope Francis accepted Muench's letter of resignation as bishop of Baton Rouge after Muench reached the mandatory retirement age of 75.

== See also ==
- Catholic Church hierarchy
- Catholic Church in the United States
- Historical list of the Catholic bishops of the United States
- List of Catholic bishops of the United States
- Lists of patriarchs, archbishops, and bishops

== Episcopal succession ==
Catholic Church titles
Preceded by Alfred Clifton Hughes	Bishop of Baton Rouge; 2002–2018	Succeeded by Michael Duca
Preceded by William Anthony Hughes	Bishop of Covington; 1996–2002	Succeeded by Roger Joseph Foys
Preceded by –	Auxiliary Bishop of New Orleans; 1990–1996	Succeeded by –
