= John Iffert =

US Roman Catholic bishop

His Excellency, The Most Reverend John Curtis Iffert
- Bishop of Covington
- Diocese: Roman Catholic Diocese of Covington
- Appointed: July 13, 2021
- Installed: September 30, 2021
- Predecessor: Roger Joseph Foys

Orders
- Ordination: June 7, 1997 by Wilton Daniel Gregory
- Consecration: September 30, 2021 by Joseph Edward Kurtz, Roger Joseph Foys, and Michael G. McGovern

Personal details
- Born: November 23, 1967 (age 58) Du Quoin, Illinois
- Education: Illinois State University; Mundelein Seminary
- Motto: In all things give thanks

Styles of John Iffert
- Reference style: His Excellency; The Most Reverend
- Spoken style: Your Excellency
- Religious style: Bishop

John Curtis Iffert (born November 23, 1967) is an American prelate of the Roman Catholic Church who has been serving as bishop for the Diocese of Covington in Kentucky since 2021.

== Biography ==
=== Early life ===
John Iffert was born in Du Quoin, Illinois on November 23, 1967. He studied at Illinois State University in Normal, Illinois, where he earned a Bachelor of Political Science degree in 1988.

During the early 1990's, Iffert entered Mundelein Seminary in Mundelein, Illinois. He earned a Bachelor of Sacred Theology degree from Mundelein in 1996 and a Master of Divinity degree in 1997.

=== Priesthood ===
On June 7, 1997, Iffert was ordained to the priesthood for the Diocese of Belleville by Cardinal Wilton Gregory, then bishop of the diocese at the time, at Sacred Heart Church in Du Quoin.

After his 1997 ordination, the diocese assigned Iffert as the parochial vicar of the Cathedral of St. Peter Parish in Belleville, Illinois. In 2000, Iffert was named pastor of Immaculate Conception Parish in Columbia, Illinois. During this period, he also served on the personnel board for the diocese and acted as defender of the bond for the tribunal. Iffert was also appointed as spiritual moderator for the Belleville deanery Catholic Youth Organization.

In 2003, Iffert entered the novitiate of the Order of Preachers (Dominicans), giving his first vows in 2004. He was now under the authority of the Dominican Order. The Dominican in 2007 appointed Iffert as parish vicar of the St. Thomas Aquinas Catholic Center at Purdue University in West Lafayette, Indiana. After his vows expired in 2008, Iffert left the Dominicans, returning to the Diocese of Belleville.

The diocese in 2008 named Iffert as administrator of St. Mary Immaculate Conception Parish in Mt. Vernon, Illinois. In 2009, he also became administrator of St. Theresa of Avila Parish in Salem, Illinois, and St. Elizabeth Ann Seton Parish in Kinmundy, Illinois.

The diocese appointed Iffert as pastor of St. Mary Immaculate Conception in 2010, a job he would hold for the next ten years. In 2014 he also assumed responsibility for St. Barbara Parish in Scheller, Illinois. In 2020, Bishop Michael McGovern named Iffert as vicar general for the diocese; he was also moved to St. Stephen Parish in Caseyville, Illinois.

=== Bishop of Covington ===
On July 13, 2021, Pope Francis appointed Iffert as the eleventh bishop of Covington. On September 30, 2021, he was consecrated by Archbishop Joseph Kurtz at the Cathedral Basilica of the Assumption in Covington.

== See also ==
- Catholic Church hierarchy
- Catholic Church in the United States
- Historical list of the Catholic bishops of the United States
- List of Catholic bishops of the United States
- Lists of patriarchs, archbishops, and bishops

== Episcopal succession ==
Catholic Church titles
Preceded by Roger Joseph Foys	Bishop of Covington; 2021-Present	Succeeded by Incumbent
