= Roger Joseph Foys =

Roman Catholic Bishop of Covington (born 1945)

His Excellency, The Most Reverend Roger Joseph Foys
- Bishop Emeritus of Covington
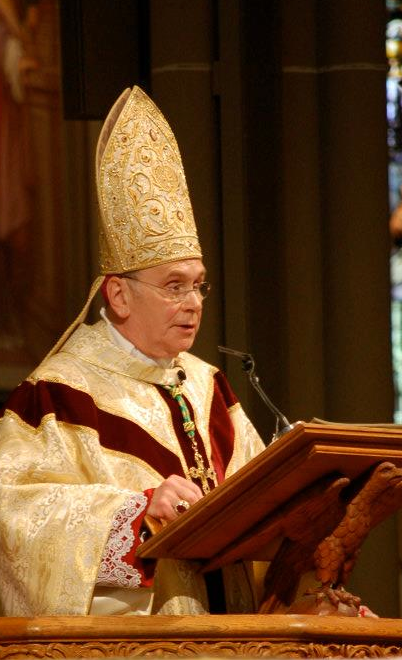
- Bishop Foys at an ordination ceremony in 2013
- Diocese: Covington
- Appointed: May 31, 2002
- Installed: July 15, 2002
- Retired: July 13, 2021
- Predecessor: Robert William Muench
- Successor: John C. Iffert

Orders
- Ordination: May 16, 1973 by Anthony John King Mussio
- Consecration: July 15, 2002 by Thomas C. Kelly, Gilbert Sheldon and Robert William Muench

Personal details
- Born: July 27, 1945 (age 81) Chicago, Illinois, US
- Denomination: Roman Catholic
- Education: Franciscan University of Steubenville
- Motto: Luceat lux vestra (Let your light shine)

Styles of Roger Joseph Foys
- Reference style: His Excellency; The Most Reverend
- Spoken style: Your Excellency
- Religious style: Bishop

Roger Joseph Foys (born July 27, 1945) is an American prelate of the Roman Catholic Church who served as bishop of the Diocese of Covington in Kentucky from 2002 to 2021.

== Biography ==
=== Early life ===
On July 27, 1945, Roger Foys was born in Chicago, Illinois. He began his religious studies at St. John Vianney Seminary in Bloomingdale, Ohio. Foys completed his graduate studies at The Catholic University of America in Washington, D.C., and the Pontifical Gregorian University in Rome.

=== Priesthood ===
On May 16, 1973, Bishop Anthony Mussio ordained Foys as a priest for the Diocese of Steubenville in Holy Name Cathedral in Steubenville, Ohio. During his years with the diocese, Foys served as diocesan treasurer, chairman of the diocesan Presbyteral Council, and moderator of the curia.

Foys was appointed vicar general in 1982 and was named by the Vatican as a monsignor in 1987. He also taught canon law for one year at St. John Vianney Seminary. Pope John Paul II made Foys a prelate of honor in 1986 and a protonotary apostolic in 2001.

=== Bishop of Covington ===
On May 31, 2002, John Paul II appointed Foys as bishop of the Diocese of Covington. Foys was consecrated by Bishop Thomas C. Kelly at the Cathedral Basilica of the Assumption in Covington on July 15, 2002.

==== Sex abuse scandal ====
Foys came to the Diocese of Covington in the midst of a class action lawsuit concerning the sexual abuse of minors by over 80 diocesan employees, including priests. The lawsuit was filed one day before Foys was appointed bishop. The claim was originally for $50 million, but grew during the years of litigation. Foys vowed to meet with every victim of abuse who was willing to meet saying,

"Those harmed by these shameful, despicable deeds now need the institutional Church and, more importantly, the pastoral Church to provide as much comfort and peace as possible. Our hearts must remain open, like Christ's".

Foys eventually met with over 70 victims of abuse personally and agree to create a system of payment where victims who were abused between 1948 and 1998 could receive compensation while not having to undergo the process of a trial.The settlement eventually cost the diocese $120 million. Each victim received between $5,000 and $450,000, depending on the severity of their case. Foys remarked:

"While no amount of money can compensate for the atrocities that were committed here, I pray that this settlement will bring victims some measure of peace and healing to victims and their loved ones".

==== Vocations ====
The number of priestly vocations in the diocese dramatically increased under Foys' tenure. It was speculated that Foys experience as a vocation director in the Diocese of Steubenville was a factor, along with more diocesan resources to vocation promotion. As of 2013, the diocese had 28 seminarians studying for the priesthood.

==== Pater Noster controversy ====
In anticipation of the release of the third edition of the Roman Missal and General Instruction of the Roman Missal, Foys issued a decree that discouraged the laity from holding hands during the Pater Noster (or "Our Father") at the celebration of mass. The decree states,

"Special note should also be made concerning the gesture for the Our Father. Only the priest is given the instruction to "extend" his hands. Neither the deacon nor the lay faithful are instructed to do this. No gesture is prescribed for the lay faithful in the Roman Missal; nor the General Instruction of the Roman Missal, therefore the extending or holding of hands by the faithful should not be performed."

The decree caused controversy in the diocese.

==== Lincoln Memorial incident ====
After an incident at the Lincoln Memorial in Washington, D.C., in January 2019 between students from Covington Catholic High School and Native American activist Nathan Phillips, the diocese and the high school initially released a joint statement condemning the actions of the Covington students. However, after further details emerged, Foys retracted the statement. He apologized to the students, claiming that the diocese was "bullied and pressured into making a statement prematurely." Foys stated that "I especially apologize to Nicholas Sandmann and his family, as well as to all CovCath families who have felt abandoned during this ordeal."

=== Retirement ===
Pope Francis accepted Foys' resignation as bishop of Covington on July 13, 2021.

== Coat of arms ==
Coat of arms of Roger Joseph Foys
Notes Foys' coat of arms combines his own design with the design of the Diocese of Covington. The left side of the shield displays the diocesan design, commissioned by Bishop William Mulloy after the 1953 elevation of the diocese's Cathedral to the status of minor basilica by Pope Pius XII. The coat of arms was designed by A.W.C. Phelps, Cleveland, Ohio, in consultation with Foys. Below the shield is the Latin phrase Luceat Lux Vestra, Latin for Let your light shine (Matthew 5:16). Adopted June 1, 2002 Escutcheon Imposed on the blue upper portion is a gold fleur-de-lis set within the arms of a silver crescent moon. Below it is a red cross on a white field. Pointing upward on the vertical beam of the cross is a gold sword. Symbolism "Galero": a gold processional Cross topped by a galero, or wide-brimmed hat, signifies the rank of bishop. Fleur-de-lis in the Crescent: the gold fleur-de-lis within the arms of a silver crescent moon is a symbol of the Blessed Virgin Mary, Patroness of the Cathedral Basilica of the Assumption. Gold Sword: The red cross set against a white field containing a gold sword points upwards, symbolizes Saint Paul, patron of the Diocese of Covington. "White Fleur-de-lis": Symbolizes not only Mary in this instance, but also the Cistercian Order and Blessed Roger Ellant. "White Lilly": Represents Saint Joseph who, along with Blessed Roger Ellant, are baptismal patrons of Bishop Foys.

Catholic Church titles
Preceded by Robert William Muench	Bishop of Covington; 2002–2021	Succeeded by John C. Iffert
