= William Hughes (bishop of Covington) =

American prelate

His Excellency, The Most Reverend William Anthony Hughes
- Bishop of Covington; Titular Bishop of Inis Cathaigh
- In office: 1979 to 1995
- Predecessor: Richard Henry Ackerman
- Successor: Robert William Muench
- Previous post: Auxiliary Bishop of Youngstown (1974 to 1979)

Orders
- Ordination: April 6, 1946 by James A. McFadden
- Consecration: September 12, 1974 by James William Malone

Personal details
- Born: September 23, 1921 Youngstown, Ohio, US
- Died: February 7, 2013 (aged 91)
- Denomination: Roman Catholic

William Anthony Hughes (September 23, 1921 – February 7, 2013) was an American prelate of the Catholic Church. He served as bishop of Covington in Kentucky from 1979 to 1995.

== Biography ==
=== Early life ===
William Hughes was born on September 23, 1921, in Youngstown, Ohio, to James and Anna (née Philbin) Hughes, both Irish immigrants. After attending Ursuline High School in Youngstown, he studied at St. Charles College in Catonsville, Maryland, where he graduated summa cum laude. He completed his theological studies at St. Mary Seminary in Cleveland, Ohio.

=== Priesthood ===
Hughes was ordained to the priesthood for the Diocese of Youngstown by Bishop James A. McFadden on April 6, 1946, at St. Columba's Cathedral in Youngstown, Ohio. After his ordination, the diocese assigned Hughes as a curate at St. Charles Parish in Boardman, Ohio, and St. Joseph Parish in Massillon, Ohio. In 1956, Hughes earned a Master of Education degree from the University of Notre Dame in Indiana. That same year, he was appointed as the first principal of Cardinal Mooney High School in Youngstown. In 1965, Hughes was appointed superintendent of schools in the diocese and vicar for education. He was raised to the rank of monsignor by Pope John XXIII in 1961.

=== Auxiliary Bishop of Youngstown ===
On July 23, 1974, Hughes was appointed auxiliary bishop of Youngstown and Titular Bishop of Inis Cathaigh by Pope Paul VI. He received his episcopal consecration on September 12, 1974, from Bishop James William Malone, with Archbishop Joseph Bernardin and Bishop William Michael Cosgrove serving as co-consecrators, at St. Columba's Cathedral.

=== Bishop of Covington ===
Hughes was named the eighth bishop of Covington by Pope John Paul II on April 13, 1979. He was installed at the Cathedral Basilica of the Assumption in Covington, Kentucky, on May 8, 1979. During his tenure, Hughes was criticized for inviting pro-choice figures, such as Revered Robert Drinan, a member of the US House of Representatives, and actress Marlo Thomas to speak at church-sponsored events, and for saying mass for gays and lesbians at Chicago in 1992. Within the United States Conference of Catholic Bishops, he served as chair of the Subcommittee on Spiritual Renewal and Continuing Education.

=== Retirement and death ===
Hughes resigned as bishop of Covington on July 4, 1995. He was succeeded by Bishop Robert William Muench.Hughes died on February 7, 2013. He was buried at St. Mary Cemetery in Fort Mitchell, Kentucky.

== Episcopal succession ==
Catholic Church titles
Preceded by Richard Henry Ackerman	Bishop of Covington; 1979—1995	Succeeded by Robert William Muench
