= Richard Henry Ackerman =

American Catholic prelate (1903–1992)

His Excellency, The Most Reverend Richard Henry Ackerman C.S.Sp.
- Bishop of Covington; Titular Bishop of Lares
- Church: Catholic Church
- Diocese: Covington
- Appointed: April 4, 1960
- Installed: May 17, 1960
- Retired: November 28, 1978
- Predecessor: William Theodore Mulloy
- Successor: William Anthony Hughes
- Previous posts: Auxiliary Bishop of San Diego (1956‍–‍1960); Titular Bishop of Lares (1956‍–‍1960)

Orders
- Ordination: August 28, 1926 by Maurice Francis McAuliffe
- Consecration: May 22, 1956 by John Francis Dearden, Jean Gay, Thomas John McDonnell

Personal details
- Born: August 30, 1903 Pittsburgh, Pennsylvania, U.S.
- Died: November 18, 1992 (aged 89) Covington, Kentucky, U.S.
- Motto: Quia tu mecum es (Because you are with me)

Styles of Richard Henry Ackerman C.S.S.p.
- Reference style: His Excellency; The Most Reverend
- Spoken style: Your Excellency
- Religious style: Bishop

Richard Henry Ackerman, C.S.Sp. (August 30, 1903 – November 18, 1992) was an American Latin Catholic prelate of the Catholic Church. He served as bishop of the Diocese of Covington in Kentucky from 1960 to 1978. He previously served as an auxiliary bishop of the Diocese of San Diego in California from 1956 to 1960. Ackerman was a member of the Congregation of the Holy Ghost (Holy Ghost Fathers).

== Early life and education ==
Richard Ackerman was born on August 30, 1903, in Pittsburgh, Pennsylvania, to John and Josephine (née Richard) Ackerman. After graduating from Duquesne University high school in Pittsburgh, he entered the Duquesne University School of Drama in 1920.

Deciding to become a priest, Ackerman joined the Holy Ghost Fathers in 1921 and made his religious profession to the order at Ridgefield, Connecticut on August 15, 1922.

== Priesthood ==
Ackerman was ordained to the priesthood for the Holy Ghost Fathers in Norwalk, Connecticut, by Bishop Maurice F. McAuliffe on August 28, 1926. After his ordination, the Holy Ghost Fathers assigned Ackerman as assistant pastor at St. Benedict the Moor Parish in Pittsburgh and later at St. Mary Parish in Detroit, Michigan. Between 1926 and 1940, Ackerman also served as master of novices for the Holy Ghost Fathers and assistant to the professor of philosophy at St. Mary Seminary in Norwalk.

Akerman was later appointed as assistant to the national director of the Pontifical Association of the Holy Childhood in New York City. He was named national director in 1941, and vice-president of the Association's Superior Council in 1947. On the 25th anniversary of his ordination in 1951, Ackerman was presented with the Grand Cross Pro Ecclesia et Pontifice by Pope Pius XII.

== Auxiliary Bishop of San Diego ==
On April 6, 1956, Pius XII appointed Ackerman as an auxiliary bishop of San Diego and titular bishop of Lares. He received his episcopal consecration on May 22, 1956, from Archbishop John Dearden, with Bishops Jean Gay and Thomas McDonnell serving as co-consecrators, at St. Paul's Cathedral in Pittsburgh.

== Bishop of Covington ==
Ackerman was named the seventh bishop of Covington by Pope John XXIII on April 4, 1960. Ackerman was installed at the Cathedral Basilica of the Assumption in Covington, Kentucky, on May 17, 1960. From 1962 to 1965, he attended the Second Vatican Council in Rome, where he was a member of the conservative Coetus Internationalis Patrum.

== Retirement and death ==
On reaching the mandatory retirement age of 75, after 18 years of service, Ackerman resigned as bishop of Covington on November 28, 1978. He died in Covington on November 18, 1992, at age 89 and was buried at St. Mary Cemetery in Fort Mitchell, Kentucky.

== Episcopal succession ==
Catholic Church titles
Preceded by William Theodore Mulloy	Bishop of Covington; 1960–1978	Succeeded by William Anthony Hughes
Preceded by –	Auxiliary Bishop of San Diego; 1956–1960	Succeeded by –
