= Augustus Toebbe =

German-born American prelate (1829–1884)

His Excellency, The Right Reverend Augustus Toebbe
- Bishop of Covington
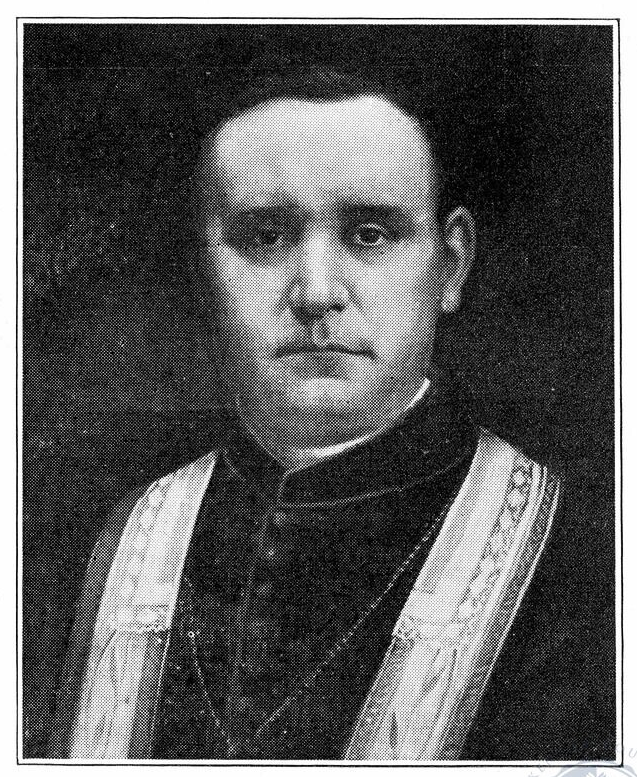
- Church: Catholic Church
- Diocese: Diocese of Covington
- Appointed: September 24, 1869
- Term ended: May 2, 1884 (his death)
- Predecessor: George Aloysius Carrell
- Successor: Camillus Paul Maes

Orders
- Ordination: September 14, 1854 by John Baptist Purcell
- Consecration: January 9, 1870 by Sylvester Horton Rosecrans

Personal details
- Born: January 15, 1829 Meppen, Kingdom of Hanover (now Germany)
- Died: May 2, 1884 (aged 55) Covington, Kentucky, US

Augustus Maria Bernard Anthony John Gebhard Toebbe (January 15, 1829 – May 2, 1884) was a German-born American prelate of the Catholic Church. He was the second Bishop of Covington in Kentucky, serving from 1869 until his death in 1884.

== Early life ==
Augustus Toebbe was born at Meppen, in the Kingdom of Hanover (now part of Germany) on January 15, 1829. He was the son of Heinrich Toebbe, a prominent innkeeper, and Maria Balte. Augustus entered the gymnasium at Meppen in 1838 and began preparing for a business career. He graduated from the gymnasium in 1847 and followed commercial pursuits until 1852, when he decided to enter the priesthood and work in the American missions.

Upon arriving in the United States, he was received into the Archdiocese of Cincinnati and completed his theological studies at Mount St. Mary's Seminary of the West.

== Priesthood ==
Toebbe was ordained a priest on September 14, 1854, for the Archdiocese of Cincinnati by Archbishop John Baptist Purcell. His first assignment was to St. Peter's Parish in New Richmond, Ohio, which included mission stations in Columbia and Ripley, Ohio.

After spending two years at St. Boniface's Parish in Cincinnati, Toebbe was named assistant pastor (1857) and then pastor (1865) of St. Philomena's Parish in Cincinnati. In 1866, he served on the council of theologians for the second Plenary Council of Baltimore.

== Bishop of Covington ==
On September 24, 1869, Toebbe was appointed bishop of Covington by Pope Pius IX. He received his episcopal consecration on January 9, 1870, from Bishop Sylvester Horton Rosecrans, with Bishops John Luers and William George McCloskey serving as co-consecrators, at St. Philomena's Church.

As bishop, Toebbe opened a boys' orphanage in Cold Spring, Kentucky, in 1870, erected a hospital in Lexington, Kentucky in 1874, and established a diocesan seminary in 1879. He also introduced the Sisters of Notre Dame and the Sisters of the Good Shepherd into the diocese. In his 14 years as bishop, he oversaw an increase of the diocese's Catholic population to 40,000 people, the number of churches to 52, and the number of priests to 56.

=== Death ===
Toebbe died in Covington on May 2, 1884, at age 55. He was buried in the crypt of St. Mary Cathedral but his remains were later moved to St. Mary Cemetery in Fort Mitchell.

== Episcopal succession ==
Catholic Church titles
Preceded by George Aloysius Carrell	Bishop of Covington; 1869—1884	Succeeded by Camillus Paul Maes
