= Francis William Howard =

His Excellency, The Most Reverend Francis William Howard
- Bishop of Covington
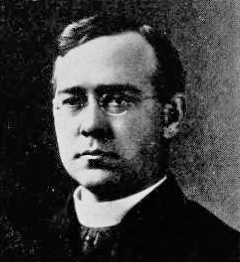
- Church: Catholic Church
- Diocese: Diocese of Covington
- Appointed: March 26, 1923
- Term ended: January 18, 1944
- Predecessor: Ferdinand Brossart
- Successor: William Theodore Mulloy

Orders
- Ordination: June 16, 1891 by John Ambrose Watterson
- Consecration: July 15, 1923 by Henry Moeller

Personal details
- Born: June 21, 1867 Columbus, Ohio, US
- Died: January 18, 1944 (aged 76) Covington, Kentucky, U.S.
- Education: Our Lady of the Angels Seminary; Mount St. Mary's Seminary of the West
- Motto: In spiritu lenitatis (In the spirit of gentleness)

Styles of Francis William Howard
- Reference style: His Excellency; The Most Reverend
- Spoken style: Your Excellency
- Religious style: Bishop

Francis William Howard (June 21, 1867 – January 18, 1944) was an American prelate of the Roman Catholic Church. He served as bishop of Covington in Kentucky from 1923 until his death in 1944.

== Biography ==
=== Early life ===
The fifth of seven children, Francis Howard was born on June 21, 1867, in Columbus, Ohio, to Francis and Catherine (née O'Sullivan) Howard, both Irish immigrants. After attending St. Joseph Academy in Columbus, he entered Our Lady of the Angels Seminary at Niagara, New York, in 1884. Howard returned to Ohio in 1888 to continue his studies at Mount St. Mary's Seminary of the West in Cincinnati.

=== Priesthood ===
Howard was ordained to the priesthood for the Diocese of Columbus by Bishop John Ambrose Watterson on June 16, 1891, in Columbus. In 1901, he organized the first Columbus Diocesan School Board. He also served as secretary (1904–1928), president (1928–1936), and member of the advisory board (1936–1944) of the National Catholic Educational Association in Leesburg, Virginia. He was the founding pastor of Holy Rosary Church, and oversaw the construction of the school building and the church itself.

=== Bishop of Covington ===
On March 26, 1923, Howard was appointed the fifth bishop of Covington by Pope Pius XI. He received his episcopal consecration at St. Mary's Cathedral in Covington, Kentucky, on July 15, 1923, from Archbishop Henry K. Moeller, with Bishops James Joseph Hartley and John A. Floersh serving as co-consecrators.

During his 20-year tenure, Howard became a nationally recognized leader in Catholic education and established a strong system of Catholic grade schools and high schools in the diocese. The Vatican named Howard as an assistant at the pontifical throne in 1928. Following the 1937 Ohio River flood that devastated Kentucky, he opened all the Catholic churches in Covington for relief purposes.

=== Death ===
Howard died of heart disease in Covington on January 18, 1944. He is buried at St. Mary Cemetery in Fort Mitchell, Kentucky.

== Episcopal succession ==
Catholic Church titles
Preceded by Ferdinand Brossart	Bishop of Covington; 1923–1944	Succeeded by William Theodore Mulloy
