= St. Henry District High School =

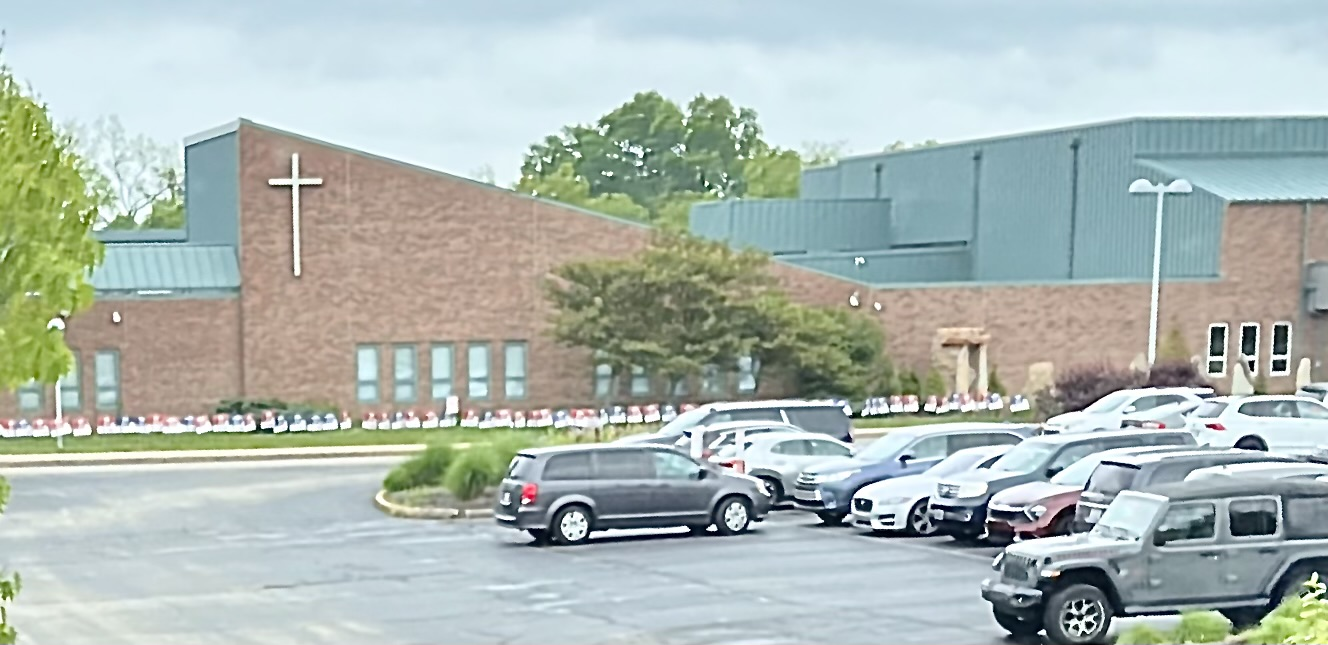

Location
- 3755 Scheben Drive; Erlanger, Kentucky 41018; United States; 39°2′4″N 84°37′25″W

Information
- Other name: SHDHS
- Type: Private high school
- Motto: Come as Many, Leave as One
- Religious affiliation: Roman Catholic
- Oversight: Roman Catholic Diocese of Covington
- NCES School ID: 00515596
- Principal: Grant Brennan
- Teaching staff: 45.8 (on an FTE basis)
- Grades: 9–12
- Gender: Co-educational
- Enrollment: 460 (2022–2023)
- Student to teacher ratio: 11.9
- Colors: Red and white
- Nickname: Crusaders
- Website: www.shdhs.org

St. Henry District High School (SHDHS) is a private, Roman Catholic, co-educational high school in Erlanger, Kentucky, United States. It is part of the Roman Catholic Diocese of Covington.
