= Camillus Paul Maes =

Belgian-born American prelate

His Excellency, The Right Reverend Camillus Paul Maes
- Bishop of Covington
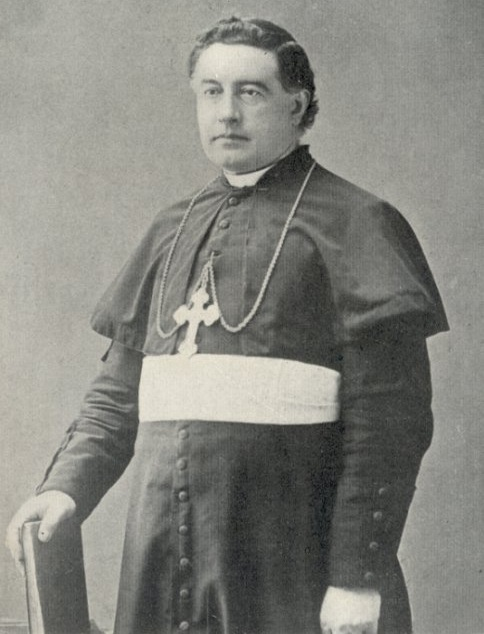
- Church: Catholic Church
- Diocese: Diocese of Covington
- Appointed: October 1, 1884
- Term ended: May 11, 1915 (his death)
- Predecessor: Augustus Toebbe
- Successor: Ferdinand Brossart

Orders
- Ordination: December 19, 1868 by Charles André Anthonis
- Consecration: January 25, 1885 by William Henry Elder

Personal details
- Born: March 13, 1846 Kortrijk, West Flanders, Belgium
- Died: May 11, 1915 (aged 69) Covington, Kentucky, U.S.
- Motto: Crux mihi dux (The cross is my guide)

Styles of Camillus Paul Maes
- Reference style: His Excellency; The Right Reverend
- Spoken style: Your Excellency
- Religious style: Bishop

Camillus Paul Maes (March 13, 1846 – May 11, 1915) was a Belgian-born American prelate of the Catholic Church. He served as the third bishop of Covington in Kentucky from 1885 until his death in 1915. He remains the longest-serving bishop of the diocese and, during his 30 years in office, he was most notably responsible for building the current Cathedral Basilica of the Assumption.

== Early life and education ==
Camillus Paul Maes (recorded as Camille Polydore Maes in the civil record of his birth) was born in Kortrijk, West Flanders, in Belgium on March 13, 1846. He was the only child of Jean Baptiste and Justine (née Ghyoot) Maes. Orphaned by age 16, he was subsequently raised by an uncle. He received his classical education at St. Amand's College in Kortrijk, graduating in 1863. He then entered the Minor Seminary of Roeselare and continued his studies for the priesthood at the Major Seminary of Bruges, studying under the theologian Bernard Jungmann at both institutions.

In 1867, Bishop Peter Paul Lefevere was touring Belgium to recruit priests for the Diocese of Detroit in the United States. As a favor to Lefevere for assuming his duties during an illness, Bishop Johan Joseph Faict of Bruges agreed to give him a seminarian of his choice. Lefevere chose Maes, who had expressed a desire to become a foreign missionary. Lefevere then sent Maes to the American College of Louvain in Leuven, Belgium, to complete his theological studies.

== Priesthood ==
Maes was ordained a priest for the Diocese of Detroit in Mechelen on December 19, 1868, by Bishop Charles Anthonis, an auxiliary bishop of the Archdiocese of Mechelen. Two days later, Maes celebrated his first mass at the Church of Our Lady in Kortrijk. He left Belgium a few months later, arriving in the United States in May 1869. His first assignment was to St. Peter's Parish in Mount Clemens, Michigan. At St. Peter's, Maes established a parochial school with the help of the Sisters, Servants of the Immaculate Heart of Mary.

After two years in Mount Clemens, the diocese transferred Maes to Monroe, Michigan in 1871 to become pastor of St. Mary's Parish. The congregation at St. Mary's consisted of both French and English-speaking Catholics. However, Bishop Caspar Henry Borgess soon directed Maes to organize a new parish to accommodate the growing number of English-speaking parishioners. Maes opened St. John the Baptist Parish in 1873 as its first pastor. During his seven years at St. John, he wrote a widely a widely acclaimed biography of his fellow Belgian Charles Nerinckx, one of the first Catholic missionaries in Kentucky and the founder of the Sisters of Loretto.

Borgess named Maes as his secretary and chancellor of the diocese in 1880. When the Diocese of Grand Rapids was erected in 1882, Maes was included on the list of candidates for bishop that was sent to Rome. However, the pope decided to appoint Reverend Henry Richter.

== Bishop of Covington ==
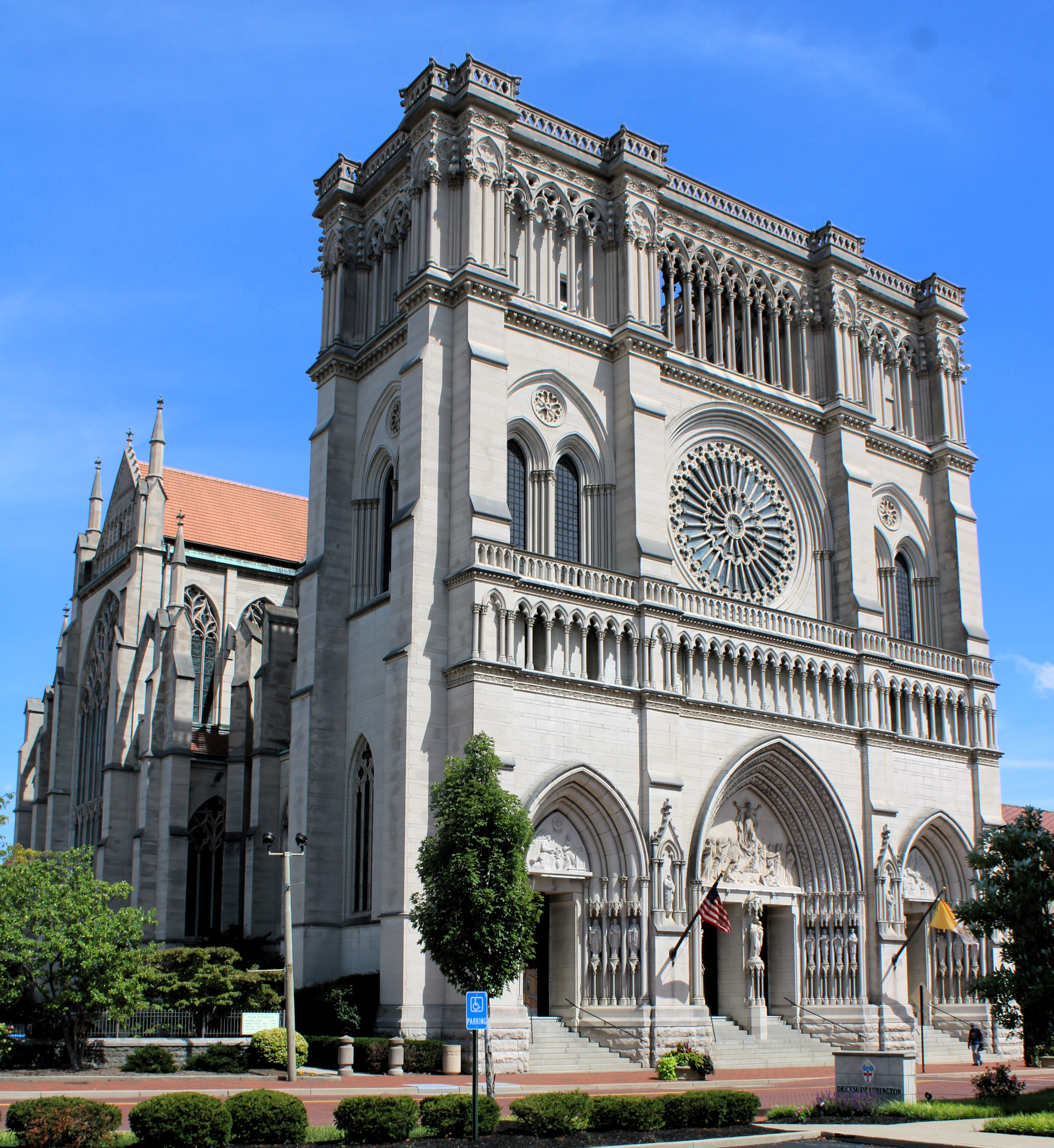
Cathedral Basilica of the Assumption, Covington, Kentucky (2023)

On September 11, 1884, a telegram from Rome announced that Pope Leo XIII had appointed Maes as bishop of Covington. He was the first diocesan priest from Detroit to become a bishop. As bishop-elect, Maes attended the third Plenary Council of Baltimore from November to December 1884.

Maes received his episcopal consecration at St. Mary's Cathedral in Covington on January 25, 1885, from Archbishop William Henry Elder of Cincinnati, with Bishop Borgess of Detroit and Bishop William George McCloskey of Louisville serving as co-consecrators.

Maes served as bishop of Covington until his death 30 years later, the longest-serving head of the diocese to date. At the time of his arrival, the diocese counted a Catholic population of 38,000 people, 42 parishes, and 38 priests; by the year preceding his death, there were 60,000 Catholics, 57 parishes, 25 missions, and 85 diocesan and religious priests. During his tenure, he also celebrated the silver jubilee of his ordination as a priest in 1893 and bishop in 1910.

=== New cathedral ===
At the beginning of his tenure in Covington, the existing St. Mary's Cathedral had fallen into disrepair, even described as "rapidly tottering to decay." Maes soon began plans for the construction of a new cathedral, a process that would span his entire time as bishop. In 1890 he purchased a property at Madison Avenue and Twelfth Street in the center of Covington. He hired a Detroit architect who had worked on the Church of Sainte Anne de Détroit in Michigan. The architect based his plans for the new cathedral on the Cathedral of Notre-Dame de Paris in France. Ground was first broken on April 13, 1894, and the cornerstone was laid on September 8, 1895. Although parts of the cathedral remained unfinished past his death, Maes dedicated the St. Mary's Cathedral Basilica of the Assumption on January 27, 1901, and opened it for services.

=== Higher education ===
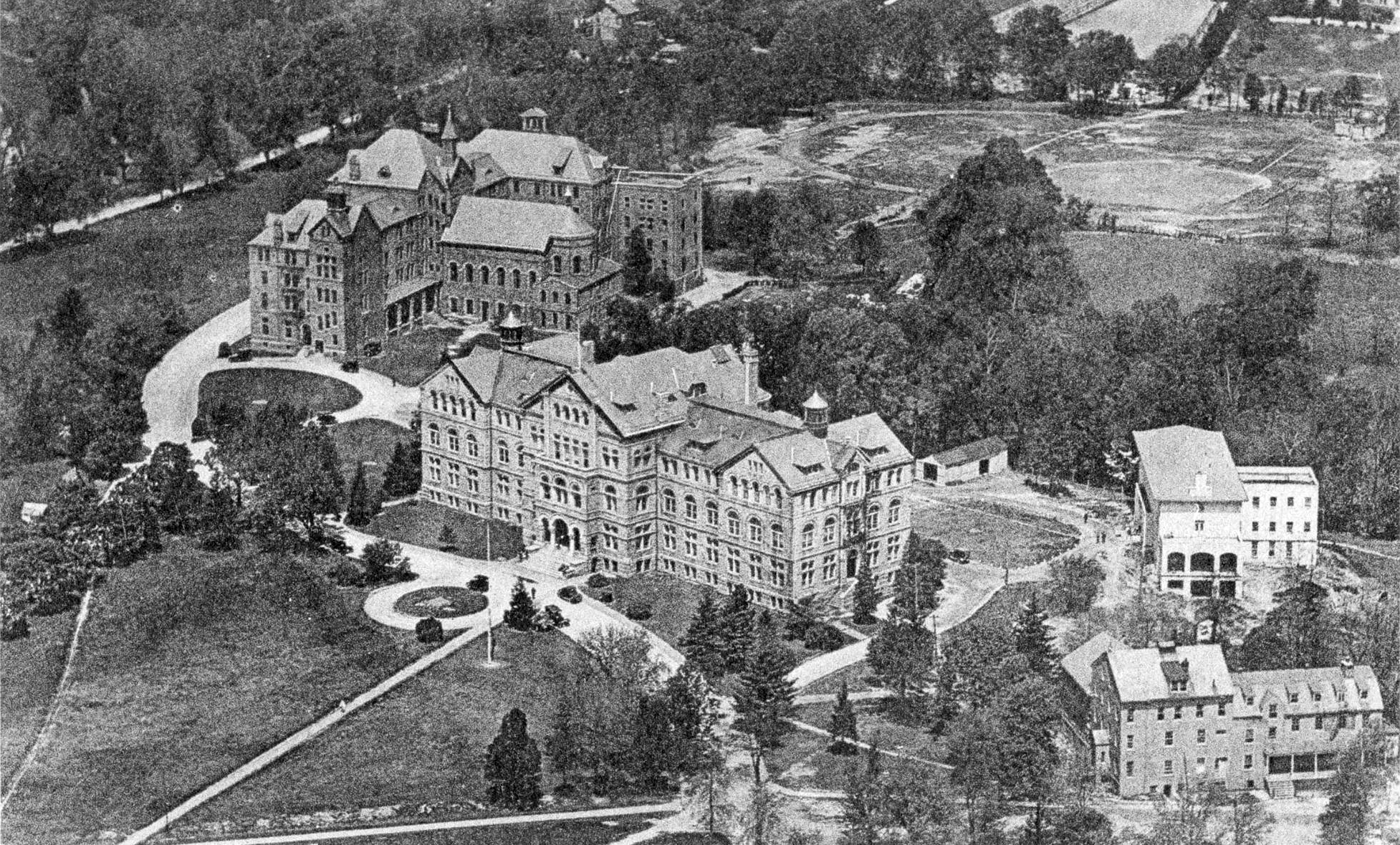
Catholic University of America, Washington, D.C. (1920)

Maes was a prominent advocate for higher education in the Catholic Church. While attending the Plenary Council of Baltimore in 1884, he strongly supported the establishment of the Catholic University of America (CUA) in Washington, D.C. He served as a member of the board of trustees from the time the university was established in 1887 until his death in 1915.

Maes also served on the bishops' board of directors for the American College of Louvain. Following the death of Archbishop Francis Janssens in 1897, Maes succeeded him as president of the board. He was the initial choice to become rector of the college in 1891. However, the bishops in Belgium objected to Maes candidacy because he was a bishop, while Jean Baptiste Abbeloos, rector of the affiliated Catholic University of Leuven, was only a priest.

=== Promotion of the Eucharist ===
Maes was also noted for his devotion to the Eucharist. He helped organize the Priests' Eucharistic League in the United States, serving as its first national moderator and editor of its monthly publication Emmanuel. In 1895, he chaired the first national eucharistic congress in Washington, D.C., attended by over 20 bishops, 300 priests and the apostolic delegate to the United States, Cardinal Francesco Satolli. Maes was elected permanent president of the Eucharistic Congresses in the United States, and participated in the international gatherings at Namur. Belgium (1902), Metz in the German Empire (1907), Montreal, Quebec (1910), Vienna in Austria-Hungary (1912), and Lourdes, France (1914).

== Later life and death ==
In 1914, during World War I, Maes made his final ad limina visit to Rome. He stopped in Kortrijk, only to discover that fighting there had destroyed his childhood home. After returning to the Kentucky, Maes' health began to deteriorate, worsened by his diabetes. He died at St. Elizabeth Hospital in Covington on May 11, 1915, aged 69.

== Episcopal succession ==
Catholic Church titles
Preceded by Augustus Toebbe	Bishop of Covington; 1885—1915	Succeeded by Ferdinand Brossart
