= George Aloysius Carrell =

American prelate

His Excellency, The Right Reverend George Aloysius Carrell S.J.
- Bishop of Covington
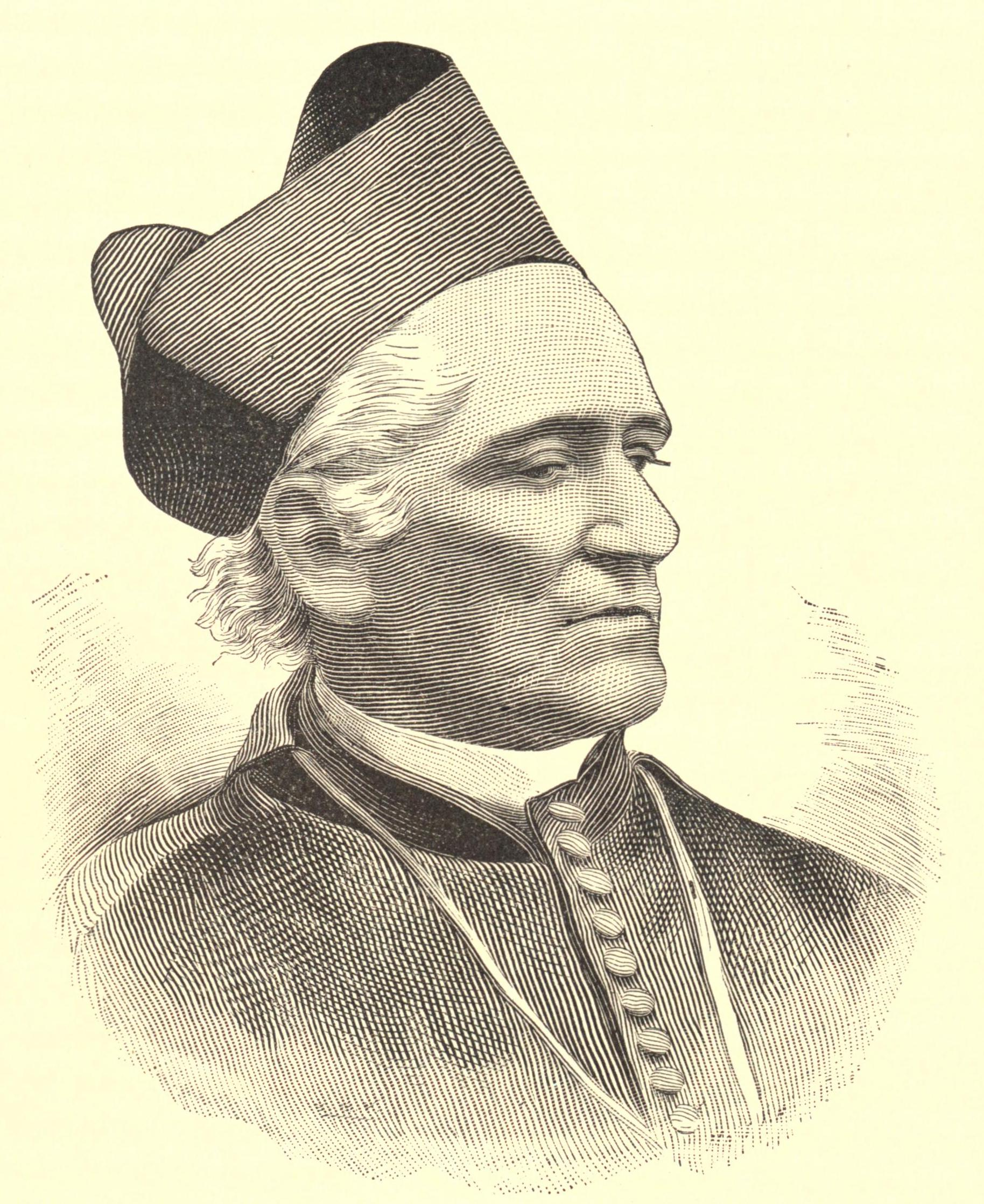
- Church: Roman Catholic
- Diocese: Roman Catholic Diocese of Covington
- In office: 1853-1868
- Successor: Augustus Toebbe
- Previous post: Rector of Saint Louis University (1843 to 1847)

Orders
- Ordination: December 20, 1827 by Henry Conwell
- Consecration: November 1, 1853 by John Baptist Purcell

Personal details
- Born: June 13, 1803 Philadelphia, Pennsylvania, US
- Died: September 25, 1868 (aged 65) Covington, Kentucky, US
- Parents: John Carrell, Mary Julia Moore
- Education: Mount St. Mary's College; Georgetown College

George Aloysius Carrell, S.J. (June 13, 1803—September 25, 1868) was an American prelate of the Roman Catholic Church who served as the first bishop of the Diocese of Covington in Kentucky from 1853 until his death in 1868. He was a member of the Society of Jesus (Jesuits).

== Early life and education ==
George Carrell was born in Philadelphia, Pennsylvania, on June 13, 1803. His grandfather, Timothy Carrell, was a native of Ireland who came to the United States before the American Revolutionary War, establishing himself as a grocer in that city Philadelphia. His father, John Carrell, was a native of Philadelphia, and his mother, Mary Julia Moore, was a native of Lancaster.

The seventh of eight children, George Carrell was born and raised in the former mansion of William Penn, in Philadelphia. After attending elementary schools in Philadelphia, his family sent him 1813, when only ten years old, to Mount St. Mary's College in Emmitsburg, Maryland. In 1816, Carrell entered Georgetown College in Washington, D.C., where he studied for four years.

Carrell then entered the novitiate of the Society of Jesus at White Marsh, Maryland. However, after only two years there, he returned to his family in Philadelphia. Soon afterwards, Carrell entered the Theological Seminary of St. Mary's in Baltimore, Maryland. He was a classmate of the future Archbishop of Baltimore, Samuel Eccleston. Carrell then re-entered Mount St. Mary's College, where he continued his theological studies under Dr. Simon Bruté.

== Priesthood ==
Carrell was ordained to the priesthood for the Diocese of Philadelphia on December 20, 1827, at St. Augustine's Church in Philadelphia by Bishop Henry Conwell. After his ordination, the diocese assigned him as a curate at St. Augustine's Parish, then sent him to a mission church in New Jersey. Six years later, Carrell was appointed pastor of Holy Trinity parish in Philadelphia. He was then assigned as pastor to a parish in Wilmington, Delaware, also supervising mission churches in West Chester, Pennsylvania and New Castle, Delaware. At that time, Delaware was part of the archdiocese.

Carrell's pastoral work earned him the praise of his parishioners, Bishop Francis Patrick Kenrick and Quakers in Philadelphia. While serving in Wilmington, he established a boarding and day school for girls under the supervision of the Sisters of Charity, and a school for boys. Carrell also spent time assisting the pastors of St. Augustine's Parish and of St. Paul's Church in Pittsburgh.

In 1835, Carrell decided to reapply for membership with the Jesuits.The Jesuits accepted him again, sending Carrell to their novitiate in Florissant, Missouri. Two years later, they assigned him as a scholastic in St. Louis, Missouri. He was soon appointed a professor in Saint Louis University, and afterwards as pastor of the College Church of St. Francis Xavier in 1843, Carrell was appointed rector of Saint Louis University. In 1847, the Jesuits transferred him to Cincinnati to teach at St. Xavier Preparatory School. Carrell was named president of Purcell Mansion College for young boys in Alliance, Ohio, in 1851.

== Bishop of Covington ==
In 1852, the bishops of the United States met in the First Plenary Council of Baltimore. They recommended to the Vatican that it create a separate diocese in eastern Kentucky to accommodate the growth of Catholicism there. Pope Pius IX erected the Diocese of Covington on July 29, 1853, taking its territory from the Diocese of Louisville. The pope appointed Carrell as the first bishop of Covington. On November 1, 1853, Carrell was consecrated in Cincinnati, Ohio, at the Cathedral of St. Peter in Chains by Archbishop John Baptist Purcell, assisted by Bishops Peter Paul Lefevere and John Henni.

When the Diocese of Covington was erected, it contained only ten churches served by seven priests. Carrell immediately commenced the erection of the Cathedral of St. Mary's, which in a year was ready for service. He opened churches and schools throughout the diocese. He introduced into the diocese the Sisters of the Poor of St. Francis, the Sisters of Charity of Nazareth, the monks and nuns of the Order of Saint Benedict, the Sisters of the Visitation, and the Ursuline Nuns. After the start of the American Civil War in 1861, Carrell requested that his friends not burden him with news about its bloody battles. His health began to fail during the 1860s, bringing him close to death several times.

=== Death ===
Carroll died in Covington on September 25, 1868, at age 65, and was buried at the old St. Mary Cathedral in that city. When the old cathedral was demolished, his remains were later moved to St. Mary Cemetery in Fort Mitchell, Kentucky.

Catholic Church titles
Preceded by none (diocese erected)	Bishop of Covington; 1853—1868	Succeeded by Augustus Toebbe
