= St. Elizabeth Healthcare (Kentucky) =

American hospital system

Coordinates: 39°02′56.0″N 84°37′02.5″W

St. Elizabeth Healthcare (Kentucky) is a Roman Catholic healthcare system covering Northern Kentucky, Cincinnati, and Southeast Indiana.

Founded in 1861 by Henrietta Cleveland with the support of the Roman Catholic Diocese of Covington and the Franciscan Sisters of the Poor, St. Elizabeth began as a small hospital and has proudly served the Northern Kentucky and Greater Cincinnati region ever since.

Today, St. Elizabeth operates six facilities across Northern Kentucky and Southeastern Indiana, located in Covington, Dearborn County, Edgewood, Florence, Ft. Thomas, and Grant County. Additionally, it includes 169 St. Elizabeth Physicians specialty and primary care offices throughout Kentucky, Ohio, and Indiana.

With more than 10,000 associates and a medical staff comprising nearly 1,600 physicians and advanced practice providers, St. Elizabeth is deeply embedded in the communities it serves.

St. Elizabeth's mission is to deliver comprehensive and compassionate care that enhances the health and well-being of the people it serves.
