= William Theodore Mulloy =

Roman Catholic prelate

His Excellency, The Most Reverend William Theodore Mulloy
- Bishop of Covington
- Church: Catholic Church
- Diocese: Diocese of Covington
- Appointed: November 11, 1944
- Term ended: June 1, 1959
- Predecessor: Francis William Howard
- Successor: Richard Henry Ackerman

Orders
- Ordination: June 7, 1916 by James O’Reilly
- Consecration: January 10, 1945 by Aloisius Joseph Muench

Personal details
- Born: November 9, 1892 Ardoch, North Dakota, US
- Died: June 1, 1959 (aged 66) Covington, Kentucky, US
- Buried: St. Mary Cemetery in Fort Mitchell, Kentucky
- Education: St. Boniface College, St. Paul Seminary, St. Thomas College
- Motto: Docete filios vestros (Teach your children to love)

Styles of William Theodore Mulloy
- Reference style: His Excellency; The Most Reverend
- Spoken style: Your Excellency
- Religious style: Bishop

William Theodore Mulloy (November 9, 1892 – June 1, 1959) was an American prelate of the Roman Catholic Church. He served as bishop of Covington in Kentucky from 1945 until his death in 1959.

Pre-1953 coat of arms of Bishop Mulloy

== Biography ==
=== Early life ===
The oldest of five children, William Mulloy was born on November 9, 1892, in Ardoch, North Dakota, to William James and Margaret Ann (née Doyle) Mulloy. He attended St. Boniface College in Winnipeg, Manitoba, then entered St. Paul Seminary and St. Thomas College in St. Paul, Minnesota.

=== Priesthood ===
Mulloy was ordained to the priesthood for the Diocese of Fargo in Grafton, North Dakota, by Bishop James O'Reilly on June 7, 1916. After his ordination, the diocese assigned Mulloy as a curate at St. Michael Parish in Grand Forks, North Dakota. He was transferred in 1920 to serve as pastor of St. Boniface Parish in Wimbledon, North Dakota.

In 1921, the diocese assigned Mulloy to Sacred Heart Parish in Cando, North Dakota. Four years later, he became pastor of St. Alphonsus Parish in Langdon, North Dakota, and dean of the Langdon Deanery. Mulloy returned to Grafton in 1933 to serve as pastor of his home parish of St. John the Evangelist and dean of the Grafton Deanery.

Mulloy was named president of the National Catholic Rural Life Conference in 1935 and rector of St. Mary's Cathedral in 1938. He also served as superintendent of schools in the diocese and editor of the diocesan newspaper.The Vatican elevated Mulloy to the rank of domestic prelate in 1941.

==== Bishop of Covington ====
On November 18, 1944, Mulloy was appointed the sixth bishop of Covington by Pope Pius XII. He received his episcopal consecration on January 10, 1945, from Bishop Aloisius Joseph Muench, with Bishops Vincent James Ryan and Peter William Bartholome serving as co-consecrators, at St. Mary's Cathedral in Covington. In addition to rural issues, Mulloy was also dedicated to civil rights for African-Americans. Speaking to the Catholic Committee of the South in 1951, he declared that "racial justice is a moral question". He also stated that Catholic leaders in the Southern United States "cannot remain silent," even at the expense of being labeled with "the opprobrious accusation of being 'anti-Southern.'"

=== Death ===
After fifteen years as bishop, Mulloy died on June 1, 1959, in Covington at age 66. He is buried at St. Mary Cemetery in Fort Mitchell, Kentucky.

Catholic Church titles
Preceded by Francis William Howard	Bishop of Covington; 1945—1959	Succeeded by Richard Henry Ackerman
