= Bishop Brossart High School =

Location
- 4 Grove Street; Alexandria, (Campbell County), Kentucky 41001; United States; 38°57′39″N 84°23′26″W

Information
- Type: Private, Coeducational
- Motto: "Charity First"
- Religious affiliation: Roman Catholic
- Established: 1950
- Principal: Chris Holtz
- Chaplain: Fr. Jerry Reinersman
- Grades: 9-12
- Gender: Co-ed
- Hours in school day: 6.5
- Colors: Green & White
- Athletics conference: KHSAA
- Sports: Baseball, Basketball, Bowling, Cheering, Cross Country, Football, Golf, Soccer, Softball, Track and Field, Volleyball
- Mascot: Mustang
- Team name: Mustangs / Lady 'Stangs
- Rival: Campbell County High School
- Accreditation: Southern Association of Colleges and Schools
- School fees: $300- Underclassmen, $475- Seniors.
- Tuition: $7.050
- Dean of Student Services: Rob Braun
- Development Director: Christie Schroeder
- Business Manager: Rob Braun
- Athletic Director: Ron Verst
- Director of Counseling: Kathy Steffen
- Website: www.bishopbrossart.org

Bishop Brossart High School is a private coeducational, Roman Catholic high school located in Alexandria, Kentucky. Brossart was founded in 1950 and is a part of the Roman Catholic Diocese of Covington.

== Background ==
Bishop Brossart High School, in 2021, had an enrollment of 280 students which made Brossart one of the largest private high schools in the state of Kentucky.

Bishop Brossart serves 6 different parishes and is led by principal Chris Holtz, along with 34 other professional faculty members. Faculty members at this school include cafeteria workers, utility workers, teachers and priests.

Bishop Brossart High School also aids students with their religious development as the school offers weekly mass and other religious ceremonies that are also available to the public.

== Establishment ==
In 1950 St. Mary Parish bought a nearby old building and opened their very own school, naming it "St. Mary High School." This brand new school was then under the leadership of its first superintendent, Reverend Francis J. Dejaco, along with the first teachers, Sister Jean and Reverend Brinker. Under the guidance of first three leaders in Bishop Brossart history, the school had its first graduating class of 25 students in 1954. Then eight years later in 1962, St. Mary High changed their name to Bishop Brossart High School in honor of a deceased bishop.

== Mission ==
Bishop Brossart since its establishment has adopted their very own "mission" by which the school abides. A "mission" refers to a vocation or calling of a religious organization, in which Bishop Brossart's mission is "to encourage students to embrace the gospel message of Jesus Christ in order to mature spiritually, advance academically, develop physically, and to foster the spirit of charity."

== Notable alumni ==
- Mike Clines, Kentucky politician

== Athletics ==
Cross Country

- State Championships: 1972, 1984, 1991, 1992, 1997, 1999, 2000, 2001, 2013, 2014, 2017, 2018, 2020, 2023, 2026
- State Runners-up: 1977, 1980, 1983, 1985, 1986, 1998, 2004, 2002, 2005, 2006, 2010, 2019
- Regional Championships: 18

Girls' Soccer

- All "A" State championship: 2001
- All "A" Regional championships: 2001, 2014, 2015, 2016, 2017, 2018, 2019, 2020
- 10th Region Championships: 2013, 2020

Boys' Soccer

- All "A" State Champions: 2005, 2013
- All "A" State Runners-up: 2014
- All "A" Region Champions: 2004, 2013, 2014, 2015, 2016, 2017, 2019, 2020, 2023
- 10th Region Champions: 2004, 2013

Football

- District Runners-Up: 2015
- District Champions: 2021, 2022

Volleyball

- All "A" Region Championships: 2009, 2010, 2011, 2012, 2013, 2014, 2015, 2016, 2017, 2019, 2020, 2021
- 10th Region Championships: 2022

Girls' Basketball

- All "A" State Champions: 2000
- All "A" State Runners-up: 1999, 2001
- All "A" Regional Titles: 12
- 10th Region Champions: 2001, 2021

Boys' Basketball

- All "A" State Champion: 2007
- All "A" Regional Titles: 15
- 10th Region Championships: 2000

Bowling

- State Championship: 2005

Baseball

- All "A" Regional Champions: 2004–2018
- 10th Regional Champions: 2012

Softball

- State Champions: 1998
- Regional Champions: 1993, 1994, 1997, 2002
- All "A" Regional Champions: 2015, 2016
