= Athenaeum of Ohio =

Roman Catholic seminary in Ohio, US

Coordinates: 39°4′58″N 84°22′19″W

- Motto: Proficere sapientia aetate et gratia
- Motto in English: To advance in wisdom, age and grace
- Type: Private Catholic seminary
- Established: 1829; 197 years ago
- Accreditation: HLC, ATS
- Affiliations: Archdiocese of Cincinnati
- Rector: Anthony R. Brausch
- Faculty: 26 full-time, 13 part-time
- Students: 225
- Undergraduates: 99
- Location: Cincinnati, Ohio, United States
- Website: www.athenaeum.edu

The Athenaeum of Ohio – Mount St. Mary's Seminary of the West, originally St. Francis Xavier Seminary, is a Catholic seminary in Cincinnati, Ohio. It is the third-oldest Catholic seminary in the United States and was established by Edward Fenwick, the first Bishop of Cincinnati, in 1829 along with The Athenaeum (later Xavier University and St. Xavier High School), which opened in 1831 in downtown Cincinnati.

The Athenaeum of Ohio is accredited by the Higher Learning Commission and the Association of Theological Schools in the United States and Canada.

== History ==
=== St. Francis Xavier Seminary ===
In 1829, Bishop Fenwick founded St. Francis Xavier Seminary in the former Christ Church in Cincinnati. Two years later, he established the Athenaeum to educate lay students. In 1840, the Jesuits took over operation of the Athenaeum and renamed it St. Xavier College.

=== Mount St. Mary's of the West ===
On October 2, 1851, a new seminary building was dedicated by Archbishop John Baptist Purcell in Price Hill, Cincinnati, and the seminary was renamed Mount St. Mary's of the West. The new name was selected in honor of Mount St. Mary's of the East in Emmitsburg, Maryland, where Purcell had been rector. In 1879, the seminary closed for eight years due to financial difficulty. When it reopened, Purcell decided to create a separate preparatory school, Saint Gregory Seminary, which was opened in Mount Washington in 1890.

In 1906, Archbishop Henry K. Moeller had a mission to build a new cathedral, archbishop's residence, and seminary in Cincinnati. The next year, the archbishop accepted a donation of 16 acres (6 ha) in Norwood, some eight miles north of downtown Cincinnati. Groundbreaking on the seminary did not occur until 1921, with dedication in 1923.

=== Athenaeum of Ohio: Mount St. Mary's Seminary ===
In 1925, Archbishop John T. McNicholas developed a unified agency to coordinate all educational work in the diocese. This new organization was incorporated under the laws of Ohio as the Athenaeum of Ohio in March 1928. The incorporation restored the name of the early college and seminary, founded by Bishop Fenwick in 1829. The Athenaeum of Ohio was chartered to grant degrees for Mount St. Mary's of the West and St. Gregory seminaries, a teachers’ college and a graduate school of science, the Institutum Divi Thomae.

The seminary also houses one of Benjamin Haydon's works, Christ's Entry into Jerusalem.

Mount St. Mary's of the West moved to the St. Gregory location in 1981 after the St. Gregory's Seminary was forced to close due to declining enrollment in 1980. The Norwood site now houses Our Lady of the Holy Spirit Center, a retreat facility, for the Archdiocese of Cincinnati.

In October 2019, Mount St. Mary's Seminary & School of Theology opened a new residence building, Fenwick Hall at the Mount Washington campus. The building also has meeting and classrooms to host ongoing or secondary formation throughout the summer months.

== Alumni ==
- Francis William Howard - Bishop of Covington
- John Luers - Bishop of Fort Wayne
- Nicholas Chrysostom Matz - Bishop of Denver
- M. Henrietta Reilly, mathematician, and one of the few women to study and later teach there under a special program for Catholic sisters in the Cincinnati region.
- Michael William Warfel - Bishop of Great Falls–Billings
- Earl Kenneth Fernandes - Bishop of Columbus
- John Edward Keehner - Bishop of Sioux City
