= Diocese of Covington =

Latin Catholic jurisdiction in the US

Coordinates: 39°03′54″N 84°30′35″W

Diocese of Covington Dioecesis Covingtonensis
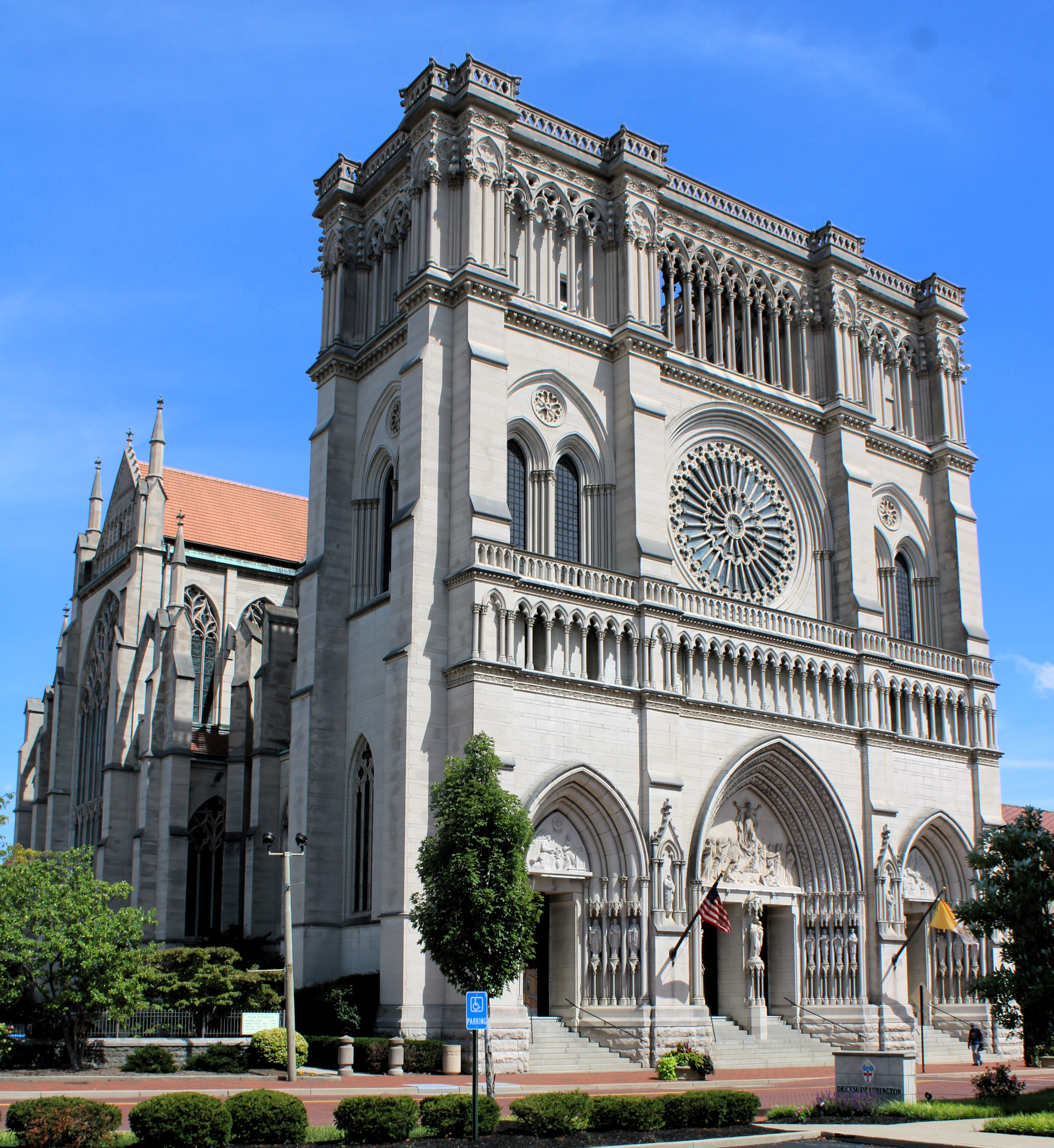
- Cathedral Basilica of the Assumption

- Coat of arms

Location
- Country: United States
- Territory: Northern Kentucky
- Ecclesiastical province: Archdiocese of Louisville

Statistics
- Area: 3,359 sq mi (8,700 km^{2})
- Population: Total; Catholics: 513,971; 92,456 (18%)
- Parishes: 47
- Schools: 38

Information
- Denomination: Catholic Church
- Sui iuris church: Latin Church
- Rite: Roman Rite
- Established: July 29, 1853
- Cathedral: Cathedral Basilica of the Assumption
- Patron saint: Paul the Apostle

Current leadership
- Pope: Leo XIV
- Bishop: John C. Iffert
- Metropolitan Archbishop: Shelton Fabre
- Bishops emeritus: Roger Joseph Foys

Map
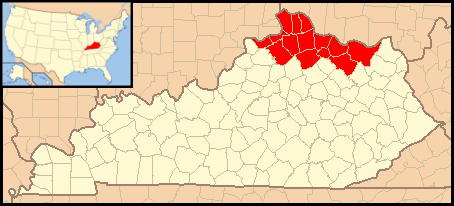

Website
- covdio.org

The Diocese of Covington (Latin: Dioecesis Covingtonensis) is a Catholic diocese located in northern Kentucky. The cathedral church of the diocese is the Cathedral Basilica of the Assumption in Covington. John Iffert is the bishop.

== Territory ==
The Diocese of Covington covers 3,359 square miles (8,700 km^{2}). It includes the city of Covington and the following Kentucky counties: Boone, Kenton, Campbell, Gallatin, Carroll, Grant, Owen, Pendleton, Harrison, Bracken, Robertson, Mason, Fleming, and Lewis.

== History ==
=== 1785 to 1853 ===
The first Catholic immigrants to the Kentucky area came from Maryland in 1785. By 1796, approximately 300 Catholic families were living in the new state of Kentucky. Among the early missionaries was Stephen Badin who set out on foot for Kentucky on in 1793, sent by Bishop John Carroll of the Diocese of Baltimore. For the next 14 years Badin traveled on foot, horseback and boat between widely scattered Catholic settlements in Kentucky and the Northwest Territory. For three years, Badin was the only priest in all of Kentucky.

In 1808, Pope Pius VII erected the Diocese of Bardstown, covering Kentucky and a vast area of the American Midwest and South. St. Mary's Church, the first Catholic church in Covington, was dedicated in 1834. In 1841, Pope Gregory XVI suppressed the Diocese of Bardstown, which by this time encompassed only Kentucky. In its place, he created the Diocese of Louisville, with jurisdiction over the entire state.

The diocese helped the German Catholic community organize the St. John's Orphan Asylum for girls in Covington, to be operated by the Sisters of St. Benedict of Covington, in 1848. Today it is the DCCH Center for Children and Families.

=== 1853 to 1868 ===
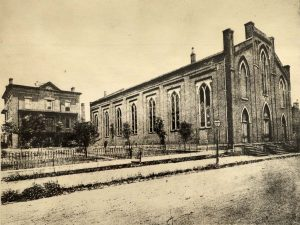
Old St. Mary Cathedral, Covington, Kentucky (1888)

Pope Pius IX erected the Diocese of Covington on July 29, 1853, taking its territory from the Diocese of Louisville. He appointed George Carrell, the president of Xavier University in Cincinnati, Ohio, as its first bishop. The new diocese consisted of eastern Kentucky.

Historically, the Catholic population of the diocese was composed primarily of descendants of German immigrants to Covington and Newport in the mid-19th century. They had immigrated to the United States in the wake of the German revolutions of 1848 to 1849. Much of the parish architecture in the diocese reflects this German cultural heritage.

At the time of Carrell's consecration, the Diocese of Covington contained only ten churches and seven priests. He immediately commenced the erection of the Cathedral Church of St. Mary's, which opened in 1854. Carrell build numerous churches and schools in the diocese and advanced education there. He introduced into the diocese the Sisters of the Poor of St. Francis, the Sisters of Charity of Nazareth, the monks and nuns of the Order of Saint Benedict, the Sisters of the Visitation, and the Ursuline Nuns.

During the late 1850s Henrietta Cleveland, a Covington resident, began fundraising for a hospital to serve the poor in northern Kentucky. She enlisted the Sisters of the Poor of St. Francis to staff St. Elizabeth Hospital, which opened in 1861. Today it is St. Elizabeth Health Care. Carrell died in 1868.

=== 1868 to 1915 ===
In 1869, Augustus Toebbe of the Archdiocese of Cincinnati was appointed as the second bishop of Covington by Pope Pius IX. In 1870, St. Joseph Orphanage opened in Cold Spring. It eventually merged with St. Johns to become DCCH. Toebbe erected a hospital in Lexington in 1874, and established a diocesan seminary in 1879. He also introduced the Sisters of Notre Dame and the Sisters of the Good Shepherd into the diocese. During his 14 years as bishop, Toebbe saw the diocesan Catholic population increase to 40,000, the number of churches to 52, and the number of priests to 56.

After Toebbe died in 1884, Pope Leo XIII named Camillus Maes of the Diocese of Detroit as the next bishop of Covington. At the time of his arrival, the diocese counted a Catholic population of 38,000 people, 42 parishes, and 38 priests.

By the beginning of Maes's tenure as bishop, St. Mary's Cathedral had fallen into disrepair. In 1890, he purchased property in Covington to build a new cathedral. To design the building, Maes hired a Detroit architect who based his plans on Notre-Dame de Paris. The cornerstone for the cathedral was laid in 1895. Although parts of the cathedral remained unfinished, Maes dedicated it in 1901 and opened it for services. By 1914, the diocese had a population of 60,000 Catholics served in 57 parishes and 25 missions by 85 diocesan and religious priests. Maes died in 1915.

Former coat of arms of the Diocese of Covington (1915–1960)

=== 1915 to 1960 ===
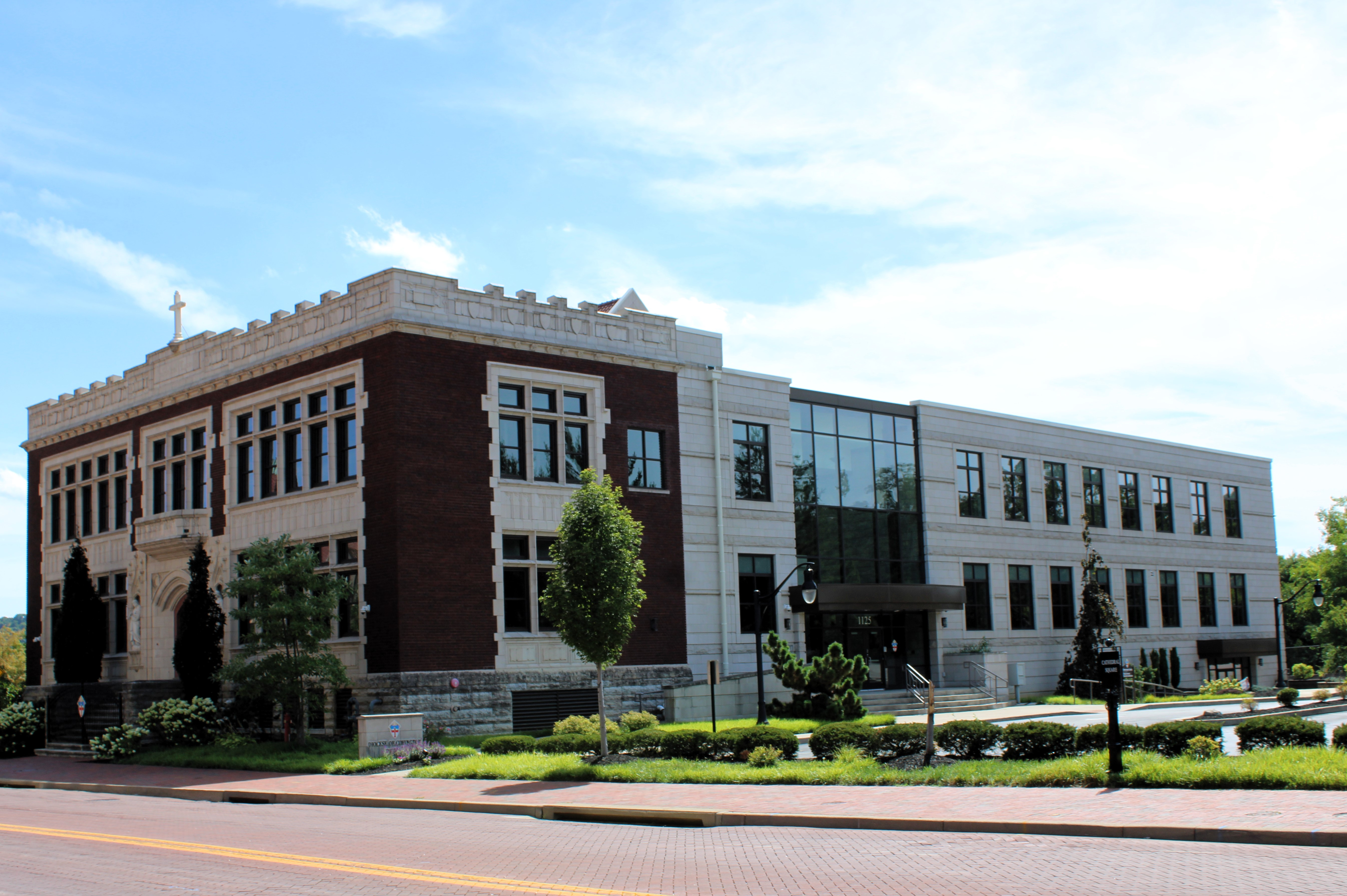
Diocese of Covington Curia, Covington, Kentucky (2023)

To replace Maes, Pope Benedict XV named Ferdinand Brossart as the next bishop of Covington in 1915. The Benedictine Sisters of Covington established Villa Madonna College for women in 1921 in Crestview Hills to prepare teachers for Catholic schools. It is today Thomas More University. Brossart resigned as bishop of Covington in 1923. Pope Pius XI appointed Francis Howard from the Diocese of Columbus that same year as bishop of Covington.

During his 20-year tenure, Howard established a strong system of Catholic grade schools and high schools for the diocese. Following the 1937 Ohio River flood that devastated areas of Kentucky, he opened all Catholic churches in Covington for relief purposes. In 1937, Pius XI elevated the Diocese of Louisville to a metropolitan archdiocese, designating the Diocese of Covington as one of its suffragans. Howard died in 1944.

The next bishop of Covington was William Mulloy of the Diocese of Fargo, named by Pope Pius XII in 1944. In addition to rural issues, Mulloy was also dedicated to civil rights. Speaking to the Catholic Committee of the South in 1951, he declared that "racial justice is a moral question" and that Catholic leaders in the Southern United States "cannot remain silent," even at the expense of being labeled with "the opprobrious accusation of being 'anti-Southern."

=== 1960 to 2000 ===
After Molloy died in 1959, Pope John XXIII named Auxiliary Bishop Richard Ackerman of the Diocese of San Diego as the next bishop of Covington. He died in 1978. The next bishop of Covington was Auxiliary Bishop William Hughes of the Diocese of Youngstown, appointed by Pope John Paul II in 1979.

In 1988, John Paul II erected the Diocese of Lexington, taking its territory from the Archdiocese of Louisville and the Diocese of Covington. This action established the present territory of the Diocese of Covington. During his tenure, Hughes was criticised for inviting pro-choice figures, such as US Representative Robert Drinan, S.J., and actress Marlo Thomas to speak at church-sponsored events. He also received criticism for celebrating mass for LGBT individuals at Chicago in 1992. Hughes retired as bishop of Covington in 1995.

John Paul II named Auxiliary Bishop Robert Muench from the Archdiocese of New Orleans as Hughes's replacement in Covington in 1996. In 2001, the pope selected Muench as bishop of the Diocese of Baton Rouge. The next bishop of Covington was Roger Foys of the Diocese of Steubenville, named by John Paul II in 2002.

=== 2000 to present ===
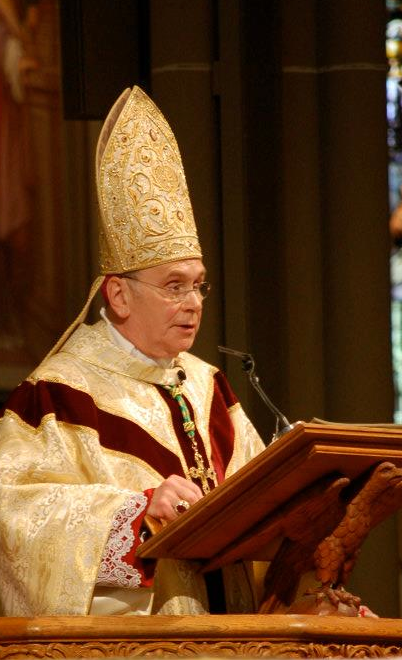
Bishop Foys (2014)

A group of students from Covington Catholic High School became involved in a nationally covered incident at the Lincoln Memorial in Washington, D.C. in January 2019. At the time, it appeared that Covington student Nicholas Sandmann, wearing a MAGA hat, was being disrespectful to Nathan Phillips, a Native-American activist. Following news reports, Foys criticized Sandmann, who denied any wrongdoing. A thorough investigation by the diocese later revealed Sandmann to be correct; Foys apologized to him for his earlier criticisms.Pope Francis accepted Foys' resignation as bishop of Covington on July 13, 2021.

In 2020, Matthew Mangine, a student at St. Henry District High School in Erlanger, collapsed while playing soccer. The coaches spent 12 minutes searching for an automated external defibrillator (AED) device to resuscitate Mangine. He died on the field. The diocese settled a wrongful death lawsuit with the Mangine family in January 2023.

John Iffert of the Diocese of Belleville was appointed bishop of Covington by Pope Francis in 2021. In January 2024, Iffert removed two priests from Our Lady of Lourdes Parish in Park Hills. The pastor, Shannon Collins, and the parochial vicar, Sean Kopczynski, were members of the Missionaries of St. John the Baptist. Iffert accused the two priests, both adherents of the Tridentine Mass, of being disrespectful of the 1969 Novus Ordo Mass.

=== Clergy sexual abuse ===
Earl Bierman, a diocesan priest, was arrested in December 1992 on two counts of sodomy. The complainant said that Bierman assaulted him several times when he was age 15, in 1974. Two other men had also accused Bierman of assaulting them when they were minors. Bierman was arrested again in February 1993 for threatening a reporter. In May 1993, Bierman pleaded guilty to 29 counts of sexual assaults, combining cases from three counties into one. Over 60 individuals had filed complaints against him. In July 1993, Bierman was sentenced to 20 years in prison. He died in prison in 2006.

In 2005, the diocese announced that it had settled with more than 100 victims of sexual abuse by paying them up to $120 million. The diocese acquired $40 million by liquidating some of its real estate assets, including the Marydale Retreat Center in Erlanger, and other investments. The remaining $80 million was paid by its insurance carriers. Additionally, Bishop Foys vowed to welcome every victim of abuse who was willing to meet him.

In 2009, local media reported that 243 victims of clergy sexual abuse in the diocese had received an average of $254,000 each, totaling approximately $79 million. The accused included 35 priests. In November 2019, it was reported that when the 2009 settlement was finalized, it totaled $90.5 million.

In July 2020, the diocese released a report on sexual abuse. It found that 59 priests and 31 other persons associated with the church had sexually abused children since at least 1950. However, it was reported in November 2019 that 92 priests and brothers who served in the diocese were accused of sexual abuse by not just the Vatican, but also by prosecutors and in civil litigation since 1959.

== Bishops ==
=== Bishops of Covington ===
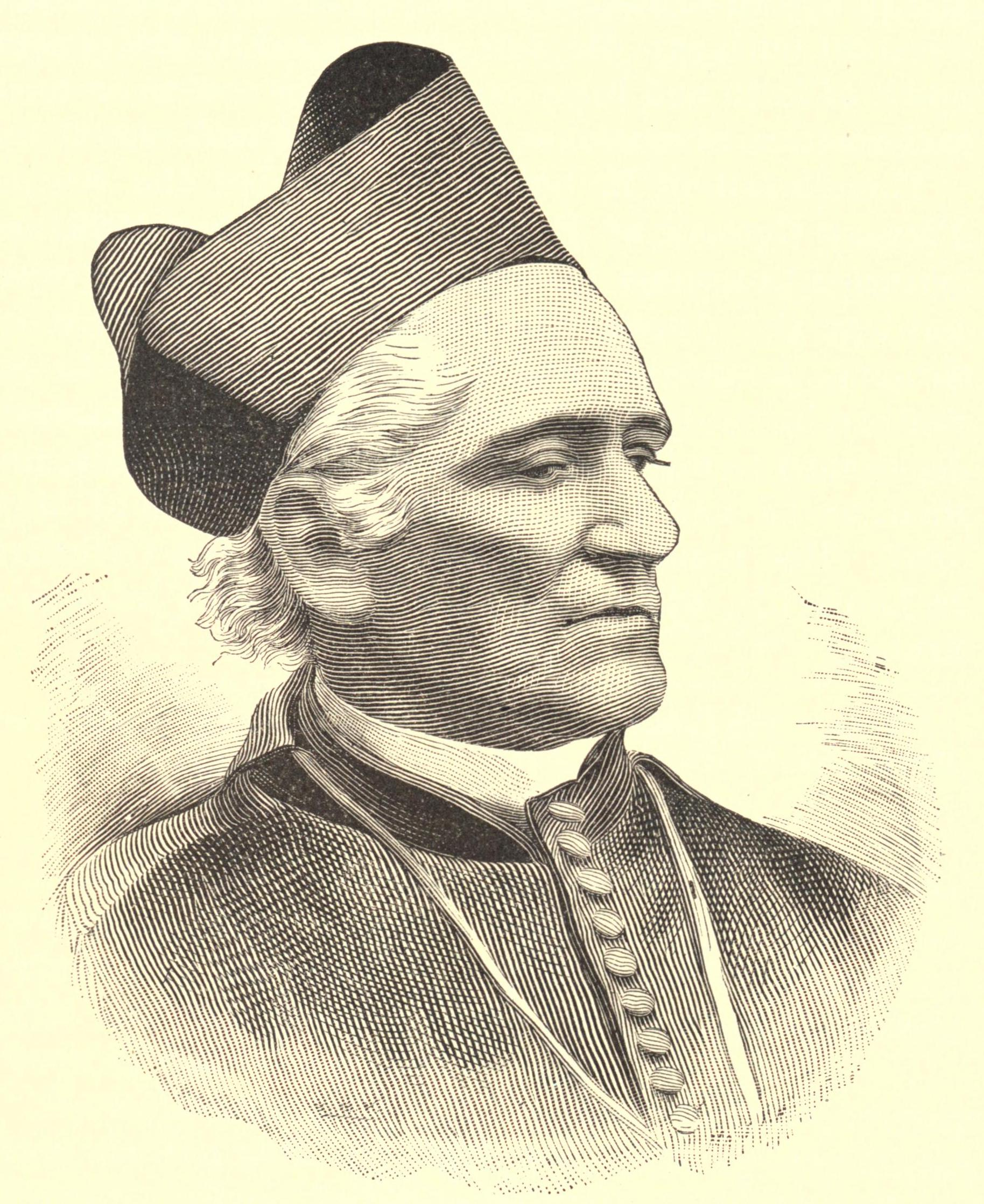
Bishop Carrell (1882)

1. George Aloysius Carrell (1853–1868)
2. Augustus Toebbe (1869–1884)
3. Camillus Paul Maes (1884–1915)
4. Ferdinand Brossart (1915–1923)
5. Francis William Howard (1923–1944)
6. William Theodore Mulloy (1944–1959)
7. Richard Henry Ackerman (1960–1978)
8. William Anthony Hughes (1979–1995)
9. Robert William Muench (1996–2001), appointed Bishop of Baton Rouge
10. Roger Joseph Foys (2002–2021)
11. John C. Iffert (2021–present)

=== Former auxiliary bishop ===
James Kendrick Williams (1984–1988), appointed Bishop of Lexington

== Education system ==
As of 2026, the Diocese of Covington had nine high schools, 24 pre-schools and 27 elementary schools.

=== Higher education ===
Thomas More University – Crestview Hills

=== High schools ===
- Bishop Brossart High School – Alexandria
- Covington Catholic High School – Park Hills (all boys)
- Covington Latin School – Covington
- Holy Cross District High School – Covington
- Newport Central Catholic – Newport
- Notre Dame Academy – Park Hills (all girls)
- St. Henry District High School – Erlanger
- St. Patrick's School – Maysville
- Villa Madonna Academy – Villa Hills
