= Cathedral Basilica of the Assumption (Covington, Kentucky) =

Historic church in Kentucky, United States

- St. Mary's Cathedral Basilica of the Assumption
- U.S. National Register of Historic Places
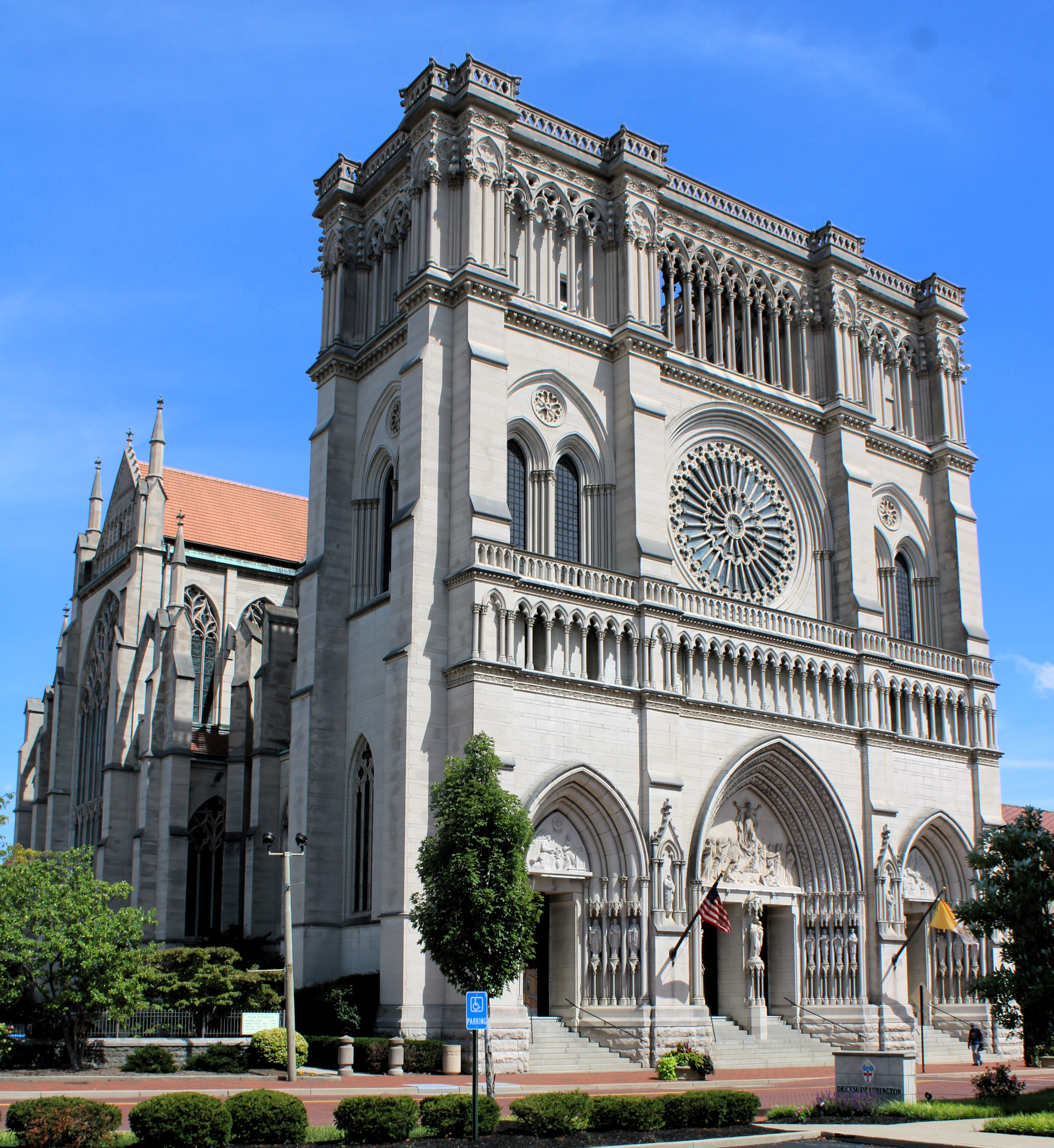
- St. Mary's Cathedral Basilica of the Assumption

- Location within Kentucky Location within the United States
- Location: 1130 Madison Avenue; Covington, Kentucky
- Coordinates: 39°4′42″N 84°30′29″W
- Area: 10 acres (4.0 ha)
- Built: 1901
- Architect: David Davis
- Architectural style: Late Gothic Revival, Other, French Gothic
- NRHP reference No.: 73000812
- Added to NRHP: July 20, 1973

The Roman Catholic St. Mary's Cathedral Basilica of the Assumption in Covington, Kentucky, is a minor basilica in the United States. It is the cathedral of the Diocese of Covington.

The predecessor to the cathedral basilica was St. Mary's Church, constructed in 1834. It was replaced by a larger church in 1851. The new church became St. Mary's Cathedral in 1853. Construction of a new largers cathedral began in 1895 under Bishop Paul Maes. It was dedicated in 1901. Pope Pius XII elevated the cathedral to the rank of minor basilica on December 8, 1953.

== History ==
=== St. Mary's Church and Cathedral ===
During the early 19th century, the Catholics in Covington did not have their own church. They relied on visiting priests from the Diocese of Cincinnati. In 1834, Bishop John Baptist Purcell dedicated St. Mary's Church, the first parish in the city. The parish in 1851 purchased another property in Covington for a larger church.

Two years later, in 1853, Pope Pius IX erected the Diocese of Covington and named George Aloysius Carrell as its first bishop. Carrell designated the unbuilt St. Mary's Church to be St. Mary's Cathedral. The cornerstone for the cathedral was laid in 1853 and it was completed soon after. By 1868, the growing diocese needed a larger cathedral. However, it was forced to postpone its planning for 17 years

The diocese finally began planning for a new cathedral in 1885. They purchased a large property in the center of Covington to serve as the cathedral campus. The diocese hired Detroit architect Leon Coquard to design the new building. He completed his planning in 1893, drawing inspiration from the Notre Dame Cathedral in Paris, France. The groundbreaking for the new cathedral was held in 1894 and the cornerstone was laid by Bishop Camillus Paul Maes in 1895.

=== St. Mary's Cathedral of the Assumption ===
Maes dedicated St. Mary's Cathedral of the Assumption in 1901. Due to lack of funds, the diocese was unable to install any stained glass windows at this time. The Madison Avenue façade, designed by the local architect David Davis, was added between 1908 and 1910. The stained glass windows were finally installed in 1910. The planned 52 ft (16 m) towers were not built.

=== St. Mary's Cathedral Basilica of the Assumption ===
In 1953, Pope Pius XII elevated the Cathedral of the Assumption to the rank of minor basilica. It is now referred to as the Cathedral Basilica of the Assumption.

The diocese in 2002 began a renovation of the cathedral interior to restore the wall plaster and remove decades of soot from candles. The Conrad Schmitt Studios of New Berlin, Wisconsin, cleaned the stone ribs, tracery and walls. Studio artists also restored plaster and select faux stone painting. The restoration the 2002 Preservation Award from the Cincinnati Preservation Association.

In 2020, the diocese undertook repairs and restorations of the cathedral structure. Buttresses were reinforced outside the building, Rusty iron pins were replaced in the colonnades, lintels and armatures. The gargoyles on the exterior were also replaced. In June 2021, the diocese installed 24 statues in the empty niches at the main entrance of the cathedral, completing the original plan for its façade. They were designed by the American artist Neilson Carlin.

== Cathedral interior ==
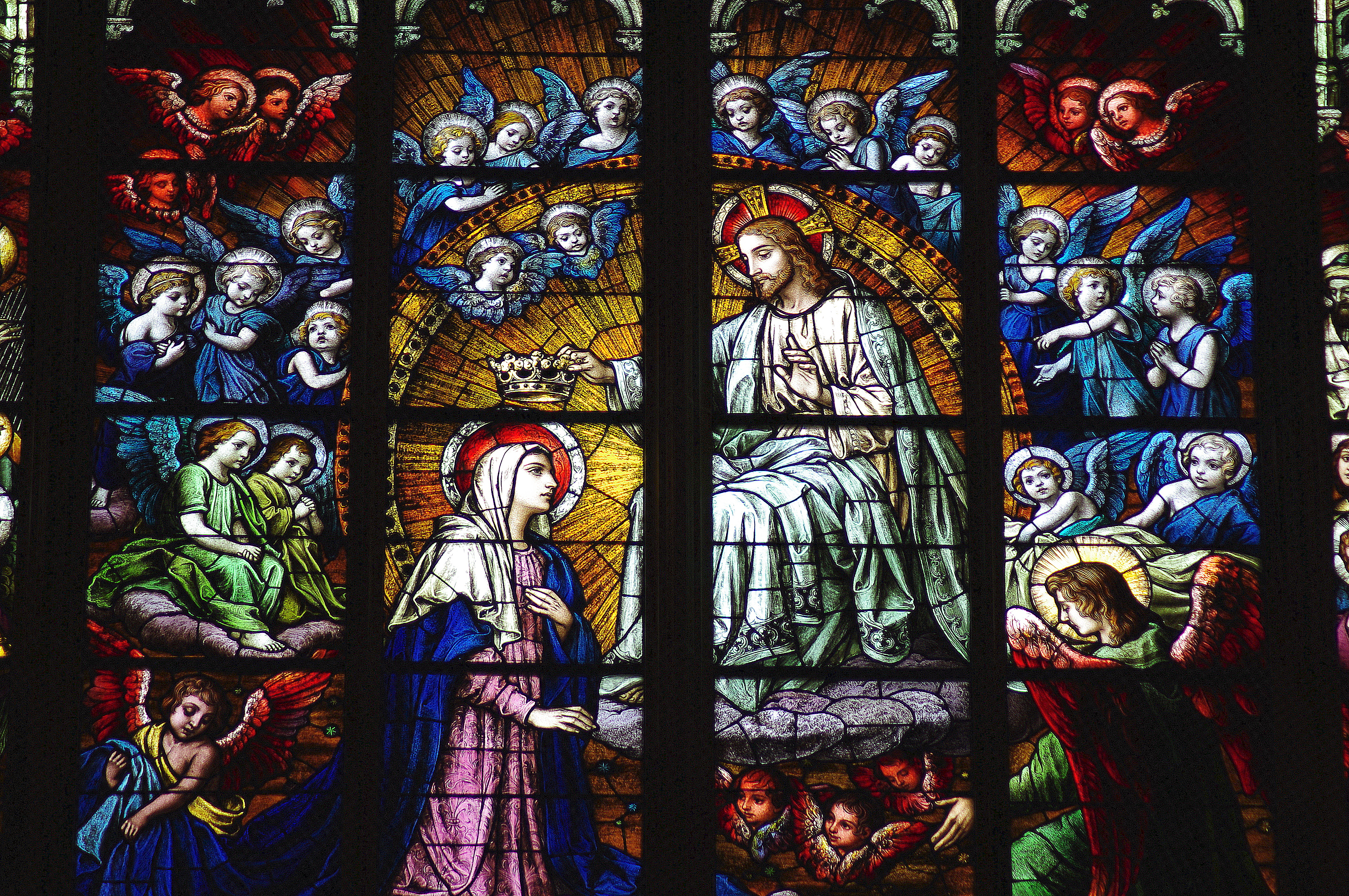
Coronation of Mary, North Transept (2011)

While the exterior was modeled after Notre-Dame Cathedral in Paris, France, the interior of St. Mary's Basilica Cathedral was modeled after the Basilica of St. Denis in Saint-Denis, Seine-Saint-Denis, France. It contains murals by the American artist Frank Duveneck. The high altar was carved from Carrara marble. The floors are covered with Rosata and Breche marble.

=== Stained glass window ===
The cathedral contains at 67 ft × 24 ft (20.4 m × 7.3 m). stained glass window in the north transept. Installed in 1911, the window was created by Mayer and Company of Munich, Germany. It was fully restored in 2001.

- The upper portion of the window depicts the Coronation of Mary after her assumption into heaven.
- The lower portion depicts the Council of Ephesus in present-day Turkey in 431 CE.

=== Pipe organs ===
The cathedral has two pipe organs, along with a one-manual, 20-rank portable organ for use in various parts of the sanctuary.

==== Willis pipe organ ====
The south transept gallery holds the four-manual Willis pipe organ. It was designed by Henry Willis III at the Wicks Organ Company of Highland, Illinois. This organ was blessed on February 12, 1933. The original pipe organ had a three-manual console with 43 ranks of pipes. However, the Aultz-Kersting Pipe Organ Company of Cincinnati renovated the Willis pipe organ in 1982 and enlarged it to four-manuals with 65 ranks.

==== Schwab pipe organ ====
The west transept gallery holds the two-manual Schwab organ. It was originally built for St. Joseph Church in Covington in 1858 by Mathias Schwab of Cincinnati, Ohio. When St. Joseph was razed in 1970, the diocese moved the Schwab organ to St Mary's. It was altered to fit the new gallery, but it retained the original mechanical key and stop actions, ivory keyboards and faux-grained casework. The Schwab pipe organ contains 21 ranks.

=== St. Paul Relics Chapel ===
The St. Paul Relics Chapel is located under the baldachin inside the cathedral. It contains a selection of relics from the diocesan collection. Its principle relics include:

- The purported carpal bone of the Apostle Paul
- The purported ulna and radius bones of Arnold of Arnoldsweiler, an 8th-century saint from the Holy Roman Empire
- Two purported skull relics from the 1,000 virgin martyrs of St. Ursula, an English woman from the 4th century

The chapel altar, installed in 2018, is composed of white oak with gilded detailing. It was dedicated in 2021 by Bishop Roger Joseph Foys.

=== Bishop Maes Crypt Chapel ===
In 2019, the remains of Bishop Maes were exhumed from St. Mary's Cemetery and reinterred in a sarcophagus in this chapel in the cathedral. The sarcophagus is made of white and green marble and displays a sculpted figure of Maes on the lid.

== Cathedral exterior ==
=== Facade ===
The cathedral exterior is constructed of Bedford stone, with the roofs are covered with red Ludowici tile. The structure measures 194 ft × 144 ft (59 m × 44 m), and the nave reaches a height of 81 ft (25 m). Four additional statues reside on niches located on the front buttresses of the cathedral. From north to south they depict the following saints:

- Thomas More – English theologian of the 15th century
- Paul the Apostle – Evangelist of the 1st century CE
- St Peter – Apostle of Jesus
- Elizabeth of Hungary – Hungarian princess of the 13th century

=== Main entrance statues ===
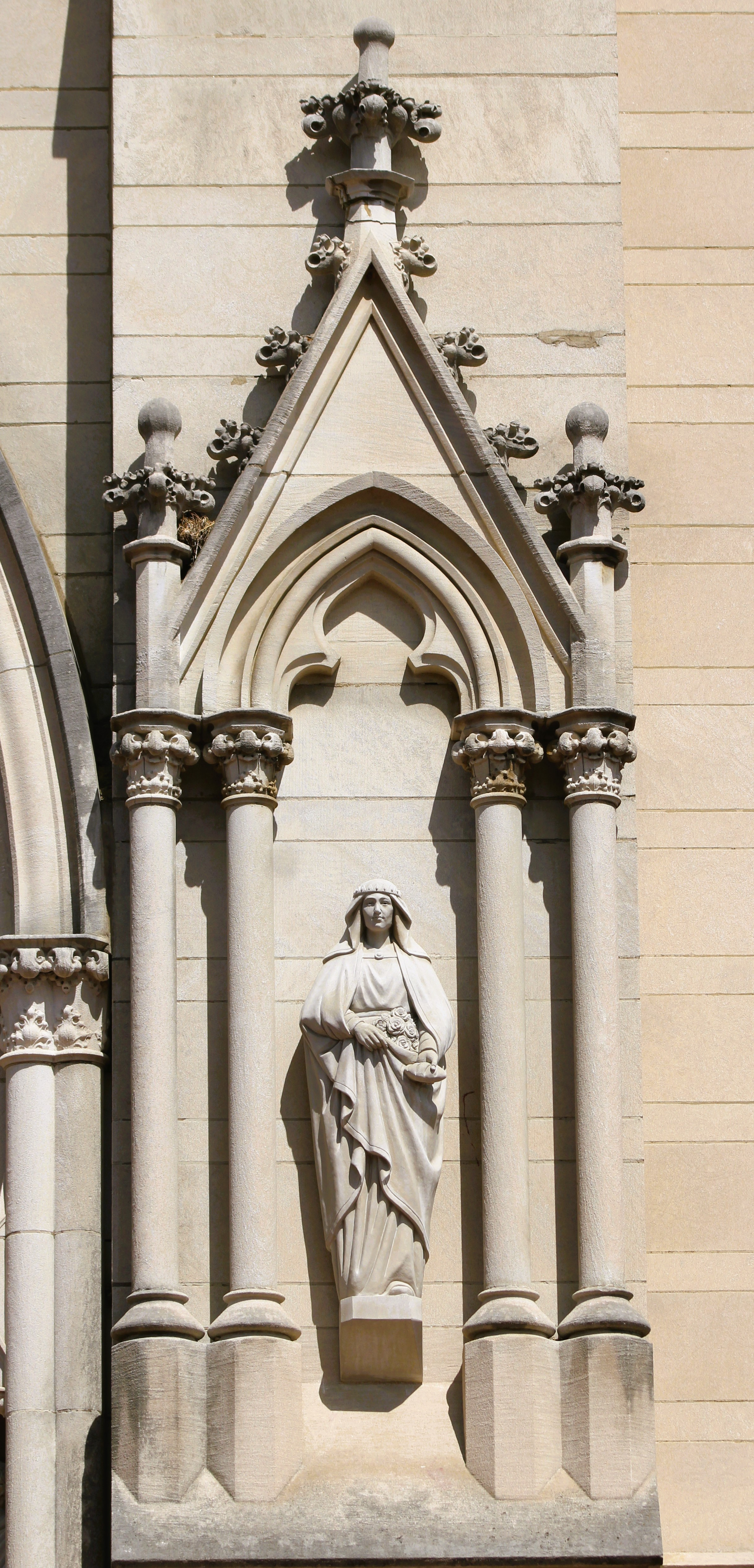
Entrance statue (2023)

Each statute honors parishes and institutions located within the diocese. The statues were sculpted from Bedford stone. They include the following saints:

- John the Baptist – the prophet who baptized Jesus
- St. Barbara – Greek martyr of the Middle Ages
- James the Great – Apostle of Jesus
- Agnes of Rome – Roman teenage martyr in the 4th century CE
- William of York – English archbishop during the 11th century
- St. Timothy – Greek bishop of Ephesus in the 1st century CE

From left to right, the eight additional statues depict the following saints:

- Pope Pius X – Italian pope of the early 20th century
- St. Patrick – Patron saint of Ireland from the 5th century
- Benedict of Nursia – Italian monk who founded the Benedictine Order in the 5th century
- St Joseph – Earthly father of Jesus
- St. Boniface – English Benedictine monk of the 8th century
- Emperor Henry II – German ruler of the Holy Roman Empire in the 11th century
- Catherine of Siena – Italian doctor of the church from the 14th century
- Charles Borromeo – Italian cardinal from the 16th century

=== Tympanums ===
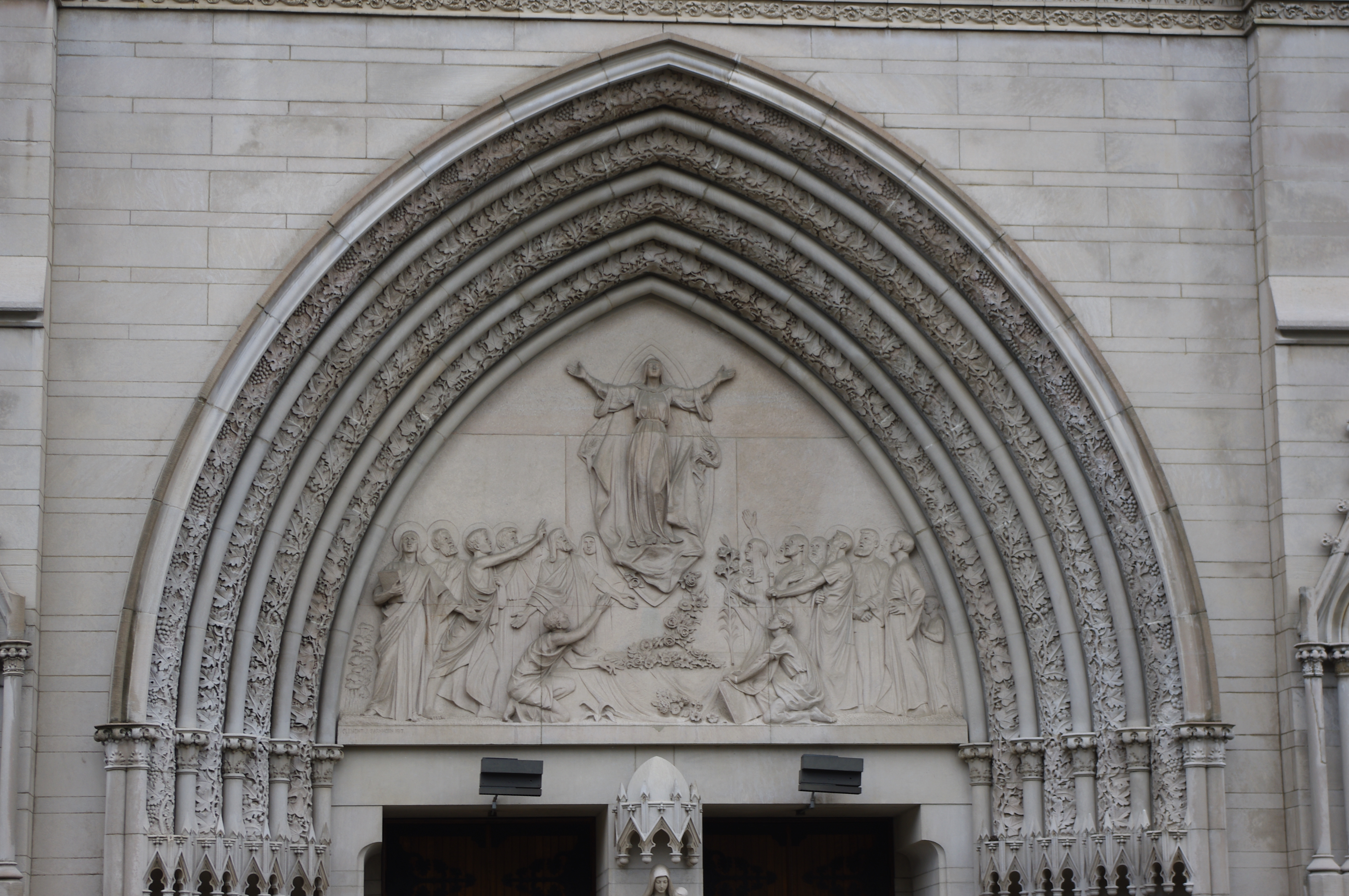
Tympanum over central doors (2011)

A tympanum of the Coronation of Mary is located above the southernmost doors.of the cathedral From left to right, the statues depict the following saints:

- Augustine of Hippo – Roman theologian from the 5th century CE
- Thérèse of Lisieux – French religious sister of the 19th century
- St . Anne – Maternal grandmother of Jesus
- Bernard of Clairvaux – Burgundian co-founder of the Knights Templar from the 12th century
- Rose of Lima – Peruvian religious sister of the 17th century
- John the Evangelist – Reputed author of the Gospel of John from the 1st century CE

A tympanum depicting the Assumption of Mary sits above the central doors, with a statue of Mary presiding between them.

Cathedral images

Interior looking toward the chancel (2006)

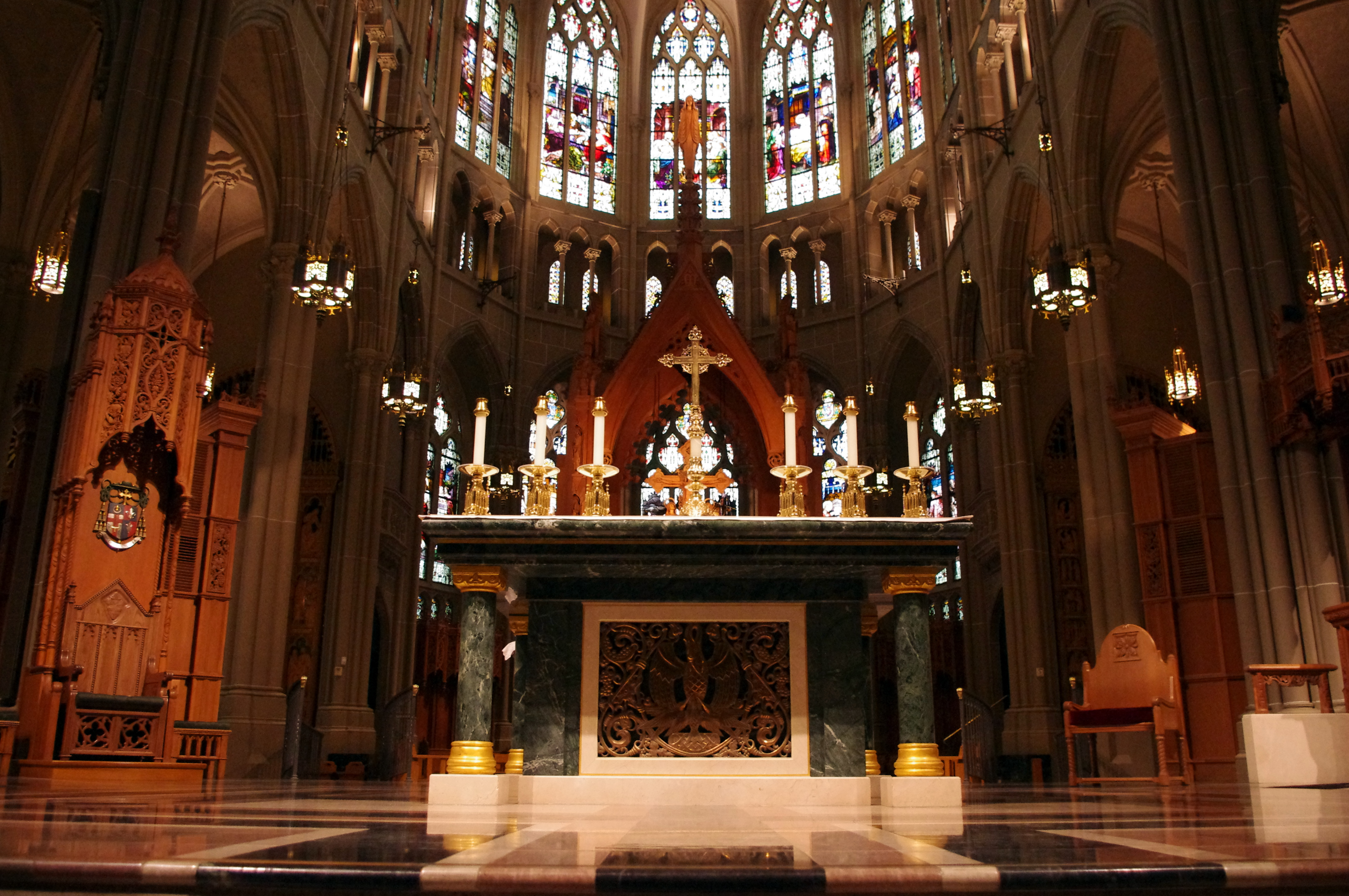
Cathedra and altar (2011)

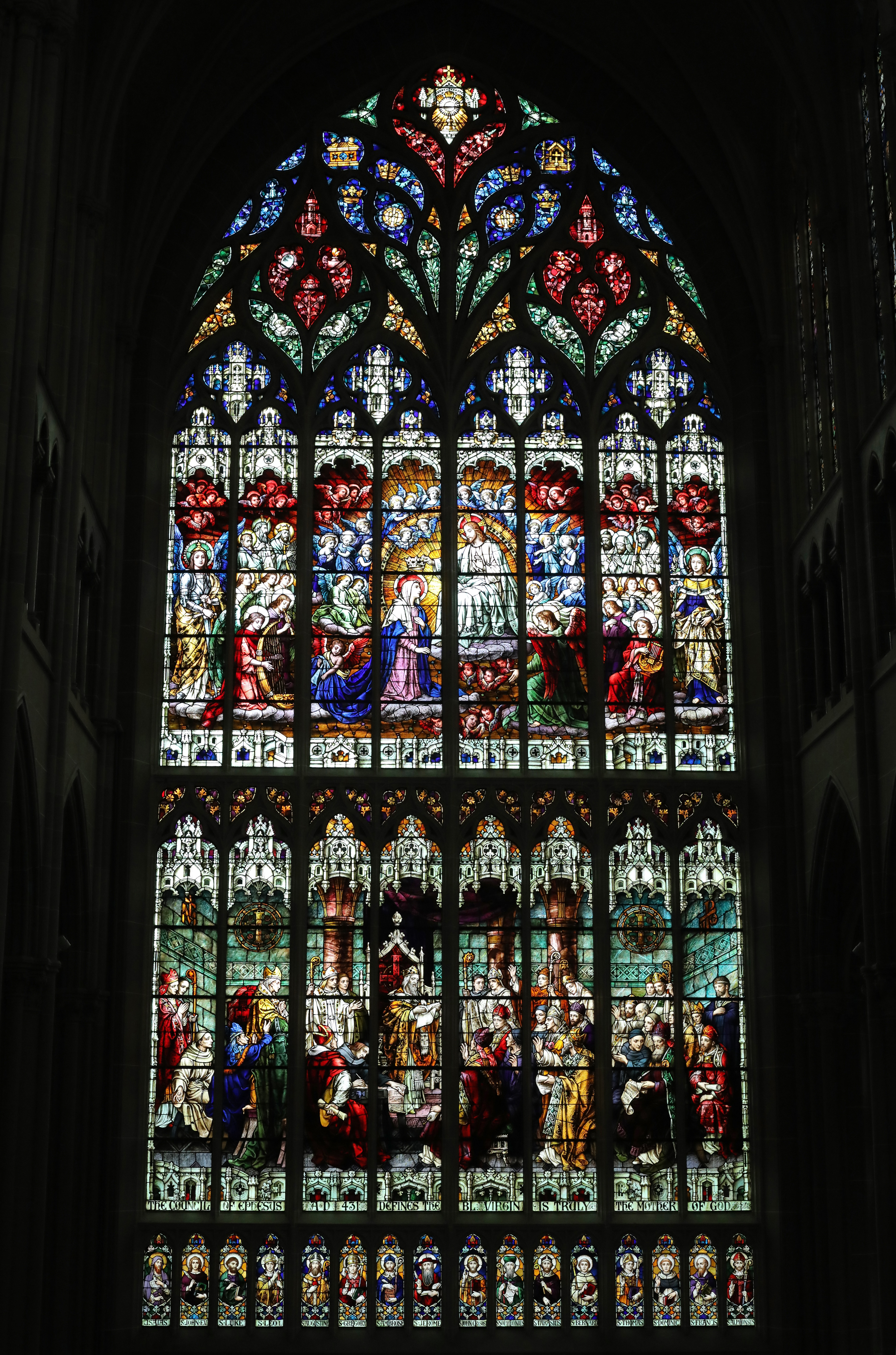
Stained glass window in north transept.(2018)

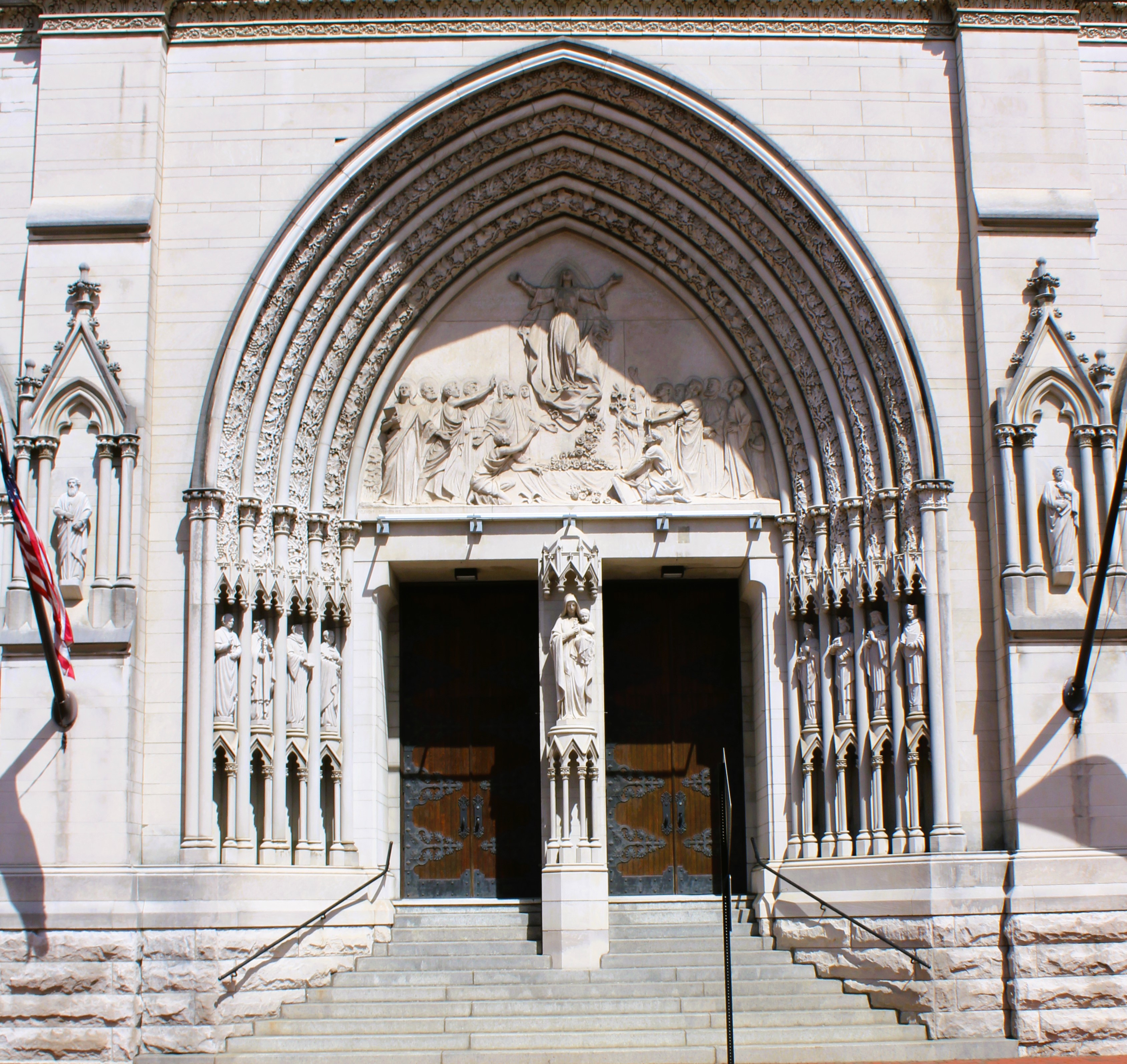
Central entrance portal (2023)

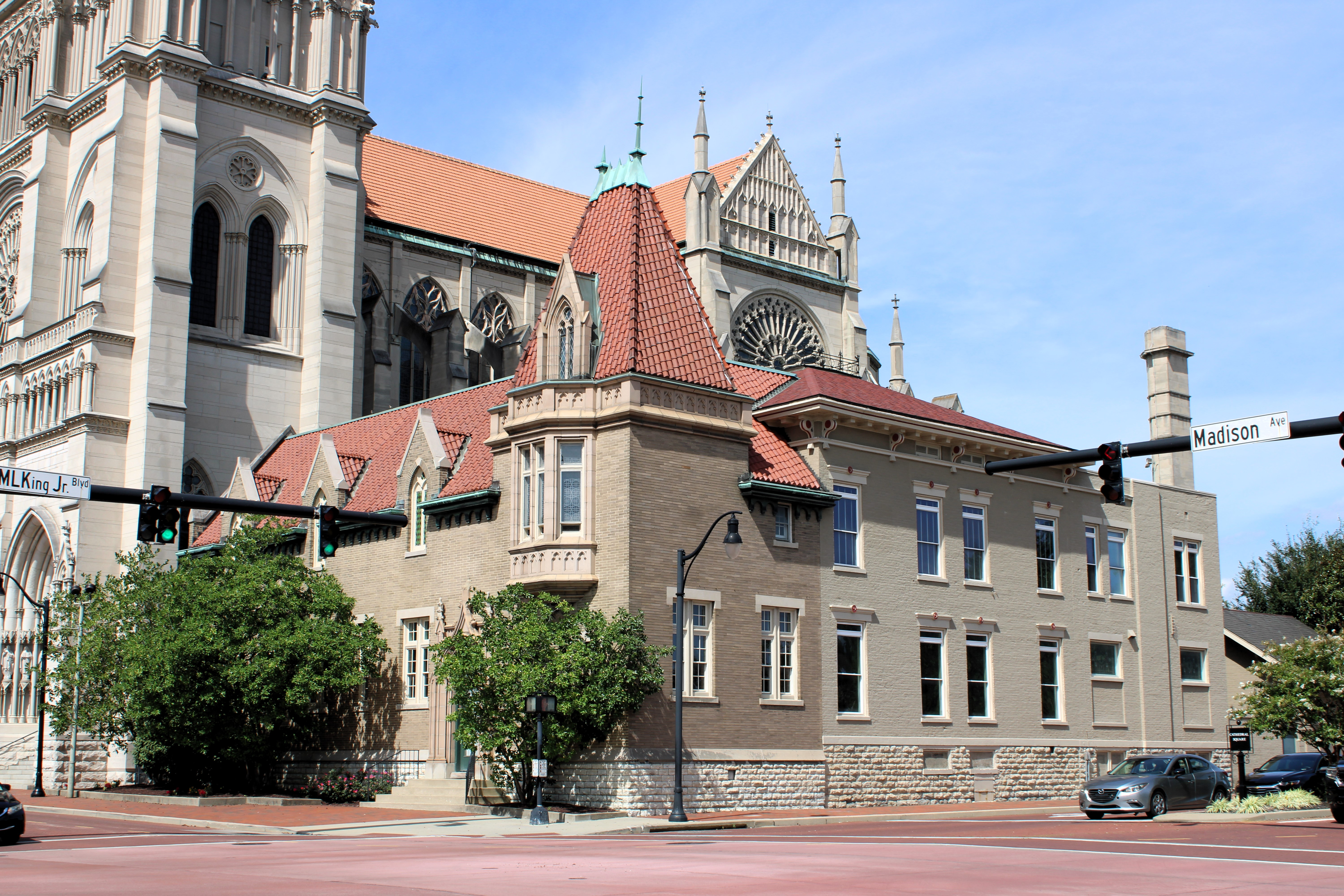
Rectory (2023)

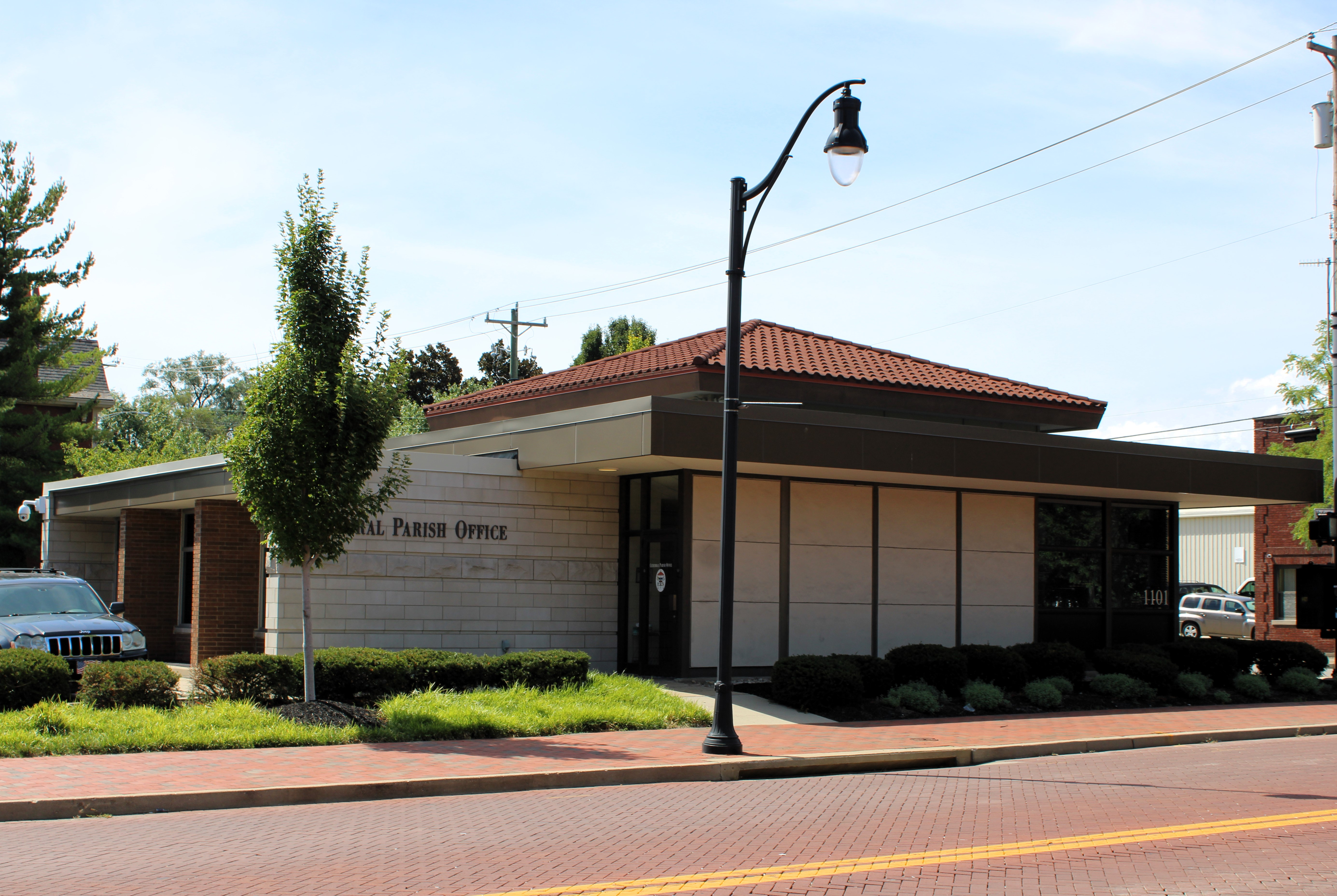
Parish offices (2023)

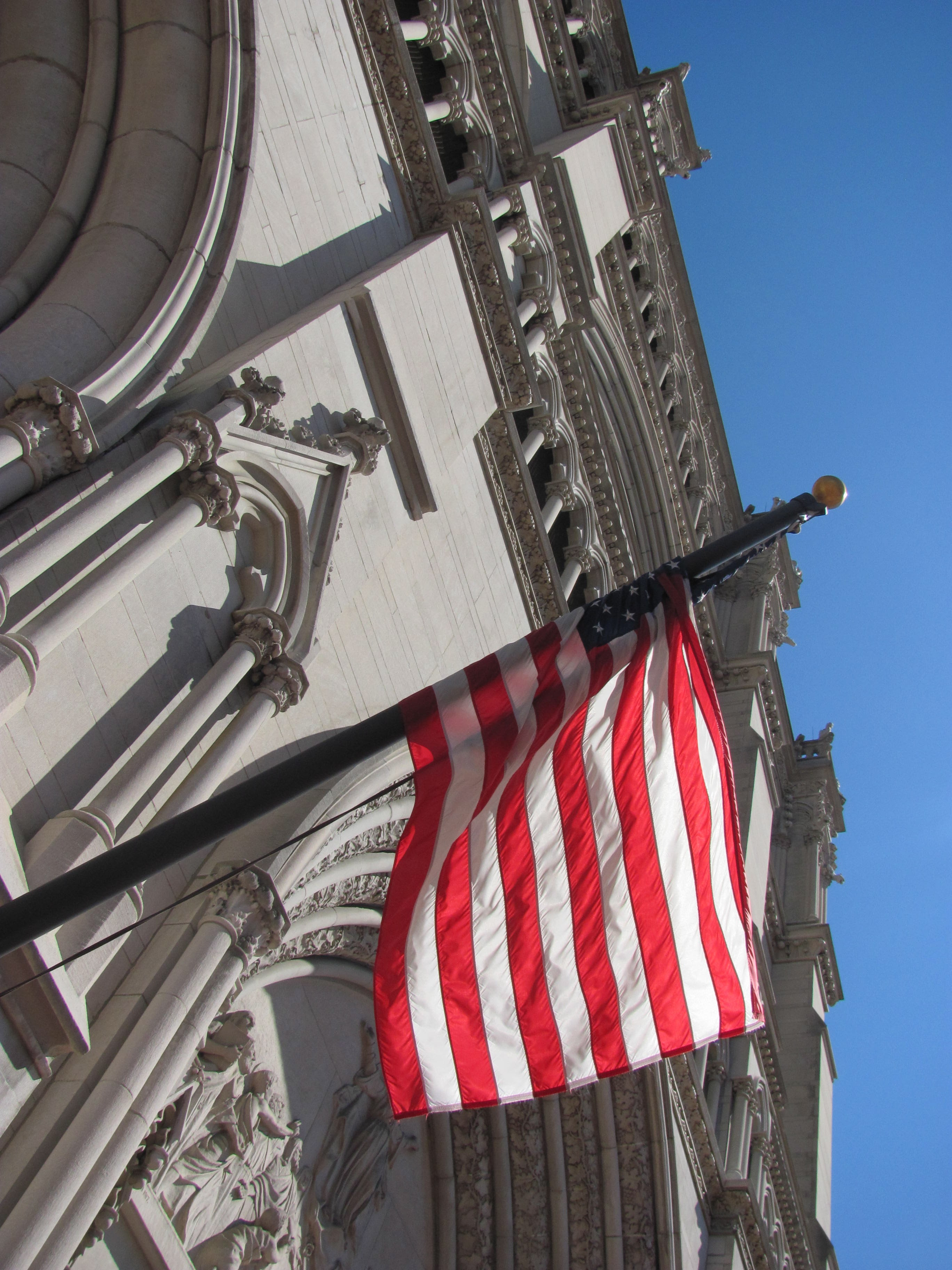
Central entrance portal (2014)

== See also ==
- List of Catholic cathedrals in the United States
- List of cathedrals in the United States
