= 2019 Lincoln Memorial confrontation =

Viral race-related controversy

- A still from a viral video of Covington Catholic High School student Nicholas Sandmann and Native American Nathan Phillips
- Date: January 18, 2019
- Location: Lincoln Memorial stairs; 38°53′21.4″N 77°3′0.5″W
- Participants: Students of the Covington Catholic High School attending an anti-abortion March for Life rally; Nathan Phillips and other Native American marchers attending the Indigenous Peoples March; Members of the Black Hebrew Israelites who were street preaching near the Lincoln Memorial

On January 18, 2019, a confrontation between groups of political demonstrators took place near the Lincoln Memorial in Washington, D.C. The interaction between white Covington Catholic High School student Nicholas Sandmann and Native American activist Nathan Phillips was captured in photos and videos disseminated by major media outlets. Other recordings of the incident showed that initial media reports had omitted details. Reports of the incident triggered outrage in the United States, including calls to dox the students. The students received death threats and Covington Catholic High School temporarily closed due to fears for its students' safety.

The short videos of the encounter that were uploaded to social media platforms received millions of views and were widely shared. At first, anger was focused on the students and the school, which, along with some of the students, received threats of violence. The incident was described by The New York Times as an "explosive convergence of race, religion and ideological beliefs" and a Vox editorial called it the "nation's biggest story".

In February 2019, the Diocese of Covington released a report made by a private detective agency hired by the diocese and the high school, stating that the report exonerated the students. Covington students filed a number of multi-million dollar defamation lawsuits against news agencies. Nicholas Sandmann, the Covington student featured in most media coverage of the incident, settled lawsuits with CNN, The Washington Post, and NBCUniversal, though he lost his suits against The New York Times, CBS, ABC, Rolling Stone, and Gannett.

== Incident ==
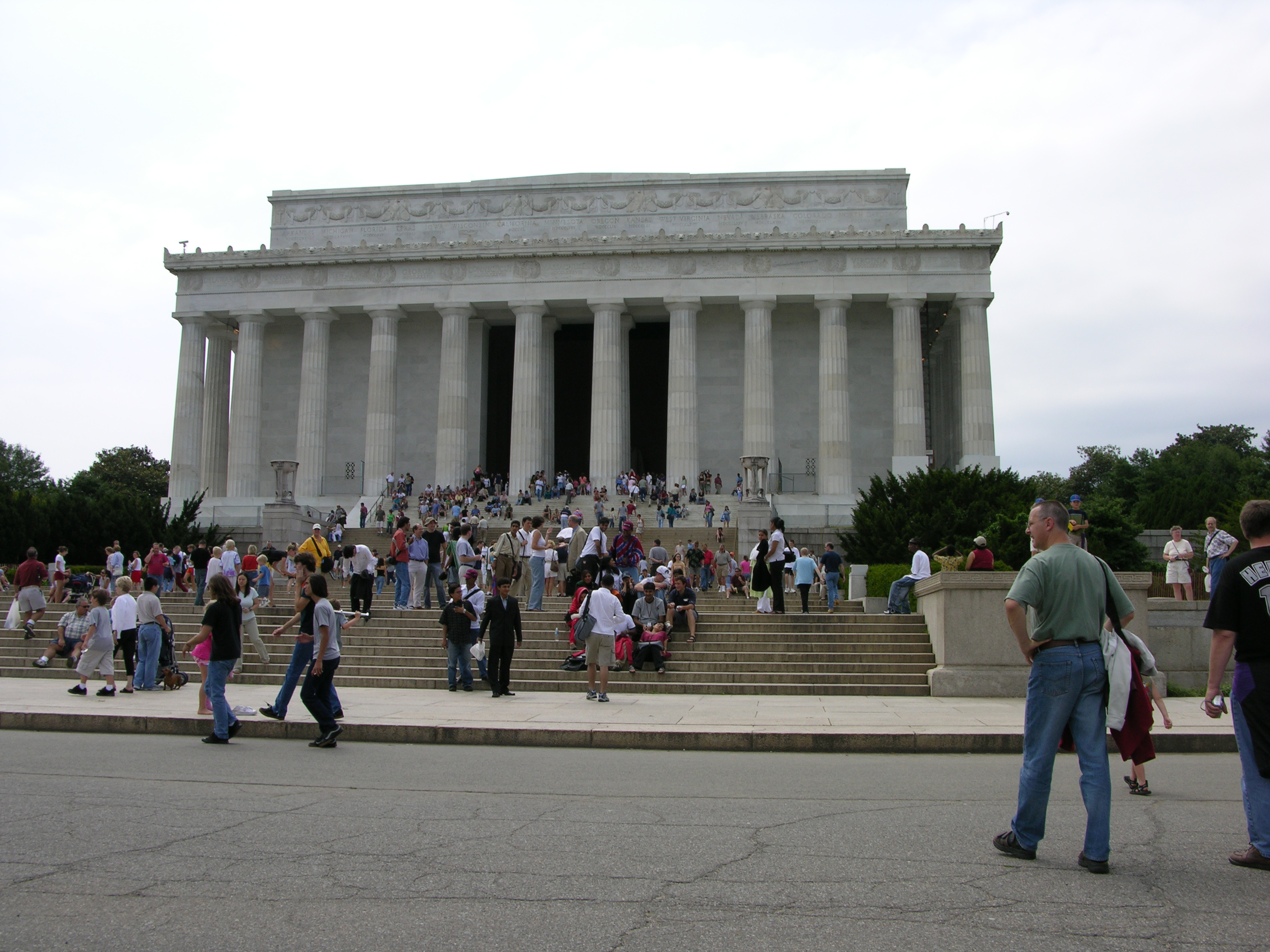
The stairs of the Lincoln Memorial, the site of the incident, seen in July 2004

On the afternoon of January 18, 2019, on the Plaza of the Lincoln Memorial in Washington, D.C., two separate marches were held: the Indigenous Peoples March, which had the purpose of raising awareness of indigenous people's issues, and the March for Life, which had the purpose of raising awareness of anti-abortion issues. For about ten minutes, there was an overlap on the Plaza of a small group from the Indigenous Peoples March and a larger group of students aged 15 and 16 from the all-male Covington Catholic High School in Park Hills, Kentucky, who were gathering at their appointed meeting place at the steps of the Plaza to wait for their buses to return home. Before the students arrived, a group of five Black Hebrew Israelites stood in a row "shouting scripture from red books" and taunting passersby. (Note: The March for Life also had a permit for First Amendment demonstrations on the National Mall on that day. According to The Cut, Covington Catholic sends an annual delegation of its students to attend the anti-abortion March for Life in Washington.) As the students began to arrive, the Black Hebrew Israelites began to taunt them. As more Covington students arrived, and in response to these taunts, the students performed school spirit sports chants, including their version of a Māori haka. (Note: A haka is a type of traditional ceremonial dance or challenge in Māori culture. They have been adopted in popular culture, often in sports.) One of the Native Americans who was there for the march said that he felt "the students were mocking the dance".

According to a January 23 New York Times article, Indigenous Peoples March participants said they had interpreted the "loud chanting" and the size of the group, as well as their MAGA apparel, as "aggressive and disruptive to their demonstration" which had just concluded. Nathan Phillips, a member of the Omaha tribe who had participated in the March, listened to the chants for what he said was about ten minutes. He said he thought that there was a confrontation between the students and the street preachers that he believed had reached a "boiling point". In his early press interviews, Phillips accused the Covington students of hate and racism. He later said that he had intended to defuse what he perceived as escalating tension between the students and the preachers. According to the Detroit Free Press, Phillips said, "They were in the process of attacking these four black individuals.... These young men were beastly and these old black individuals was (sic) their prey, and I stood in between them and so they needed their pounds of flesh and they were looking at me for that." According to CNN's Sara Sidner, two minutes after one of the students took off his shirt to lead the haka, the "drum beat of Phillips and another Native American drummer [was audible] in the video". They sang the AIM Song, a Native American intertribal song.

Phillips and a second Native American, both with ceremonial drums, walked towards the students grouped along the stairs. Sidner said that while some of the students danced to Phillips' drum beat and chanted along with him for a while, they were not "enjoying each other's company". Soon, Phillips was "encircled" by about 30 students, "many of them white and wearing apparel bearing the slogan of President Trump", red baseball hats with the phrase "Make America Great Again" (MAGA). Phillips continued to beat his ceremonial drum and sing for nearly two minutes as a boy wearing the red MAGA hat chose not to retreat with what some interpreted as a smirk on his face. The student later explained that he smiled because he wanted Phillips to know "that I was not going to become angry, intimidated or be provoked into a larger confrontation."

=== Black Hebrew Israelites ===
Earlier footage that was released did not include the presence of a group of five Black Hebrew Israelites on the Plaza near the Reflecting Pond, part of a One West Camp offshoot believing in the "12 tribes" doctrine. They stood in a row "shouting scripture from red books" and taunting passers-by. According to CNN's Sara Sidner they were "taunting ... people of all colors, other black visitors, natives, and a Catholic priest" shortly after the end of the Indigenous Peoples March, and before the students arrived on the scene. As the students began to arrive to wait for their bus, the Black Hebrew Israelites began to shout insults directly at them.

According to witnesses and video subsequently appearing on social media, the Black Hebrew Israelite men shouted racist slurs at the high school students as well as Native Americans. They called the students "a bunch of incest babies", future "school shooters", and "dirty ass little crackers", and said "you give faggots rights". Many students reacted by saying things such as "whoa" and "easy". The Hebrew Israelites also called a passing black man who tried to disagree with them a "coon", told indigenous activists that the word Indian means "savage", and said to a woman who had stopped to argue with them: "Where's your husband? Bring your husband. Let me speak to him."

== Response ==
News media started covering the story on the evening of January 18, 2019, in response to the viral spread of initial videos posted to social media. Within days of their first coverage of the incident, many news media outlets had revisited their reports and revised the narrative, as more information became available. This included longer videos which contextualized the incident, in-depth analyses and statements from spokesmen for the participants directly involved. The media were sharply criticized for basing their initial reporting on social media, particularly the user-generated short videos, that did not include the minutes before and after the incident. These new sources, which included interviews with participants, revealed the chronology of events, showing how the students had become agitated by the taunts of the Hebrew Israelites before Phillips came on the scene.

Participants at the Indigenous Peoples March posted the first videos of the incident in the evening of Friday, January 18, 2019, following the events. These first videos were roughly only a minute long, when Phillips was drumming, closely encircled by a large group of interested students. They did not include the minutes before and after that contextualized the incident. As described by Vox, the short videos gave the impression "that the boys were harassing the Native American elder". One of these was a one-minute clip posted by Guam resident Kaya Taitano, a student at the University of the District of Columbia, who was with the small group of other participants at the Memorial late afternoon when the incident took place. She filmed the moment that CNN later described as "a smiling young man in a red Make America Great Again hat standing directly in front of the man, who was playing a drum and chanting. Other kids could be seen laughing, jumping around and seemingly making fun of the chants." Taitano uploaded it to Instagram at 7:33 pm, and her video was later reposted that day to Twitter via user "2020fight" under the title "This MAGA loser gleefully bothering a Native American protester at the Indigenous Peoples March"; it received over 2.5 million views by January 21. The second video, posted to YouTube by KC Noland, reached two million viewers in two hours Saturday morning, January 19, and over four and a half million by January 24.

The first social media video clips were short and focused on this moment, leading to initial harsh criticism of the high school students, who some described as mocking and harassing the elder. Some people affiliated with the March described the boys as appearing threatening due to their numbers, actions, and the "Make America Great Again" caps and clothing that some wore. By January 20, longer videos had been uploaded. Phillips clarified that it was he who had approached the crowd of students, in what he said was an attempt to defuse what Phillips perceived to be a brewing conflict between the students and a third group of five men who were identified as Black Hebrew Israelites who had been taunting the white students with homophobic slurs.

Strong reactions to the event prompted an immediate backlash against the school, the students, and their chaperones. The Washington Post described the incident as a "tense encounter" that "prompted outrage". One of the featured speakers at the Indigenous Peoples March, Ruth Buffalo, a North Dakota Representative and member of the Mandan, Hidatsa, and Arikara Nation, said the students' disrespect of what was meant to have been a "celebration of all cultures" saddened her. She added, "The behaviour shown in that video is just a snapshot of what Indigenous people have faced and are continuing to face." Buffalo suggested "some kind of meeting with the students to provide education on issues facing Native Americans." House Representative Deb Haaland wrote, "The students' display of blatant hate, disrespect, and intolerance is a signal of how common decency has decayed under this administration. Heartbreaking." Actress Alyssa Milano wrote: "This is Trump's America. And it brought me to tears. What are we teaching our young people? Why is this ok? How is this ok? Please help me understand. Because right now I feel like my heart is living outside of my body".

Over the next several days statements from a spokesperson for the March, an attorney for the Lakota People's Law Project, from Nicholas Sandmann, and other officials, offered different perspectives on the incident. In the wake of the widespread sharing of more detailed video clips, media analyses of the videos, and statements, public opinion became polarized, with some saying the students were completely absolved of all wrongdoing and others saying the students were disrespectful of a Native American elder on a day that should have been a celebration of the first Indigenous Peoples March.

=== Further coverage ===
Still of a second video

Shortly after the event took place, the Covington Catholic communications director released a statement expressing regret that the event had happened. In a joint statement on January 19, the Diocese of Covington and the Covington Catholic High School extended apologies to Phillips, condemned the students' behavior, and said that after they reviewed the situation they would "take appropriate action, up to and including expulsion."

However, in a following letter dated January 25, 2019, the bishop of the Covington Diocese apologized to Sandmann, saying they "should not have allowed ourselves to be bullied and pressured into making a statement prematurely".

According to The New York Times, death threats had been reported by some of the Covington students' families and the school was closed for a day due to threats of violence."

On January 20, The New York Times described the encounter as an "explosive convergence of race, religion and ideological beliefs—against a national backdrop of political tension... [It] became the latest touch point for racial and political tensions in America, with diverging views about what really had happened." A Vox editorial called it the "nation's biggest story" and "American politics in microcosm" based on the competing interpretations, "identity-focused politics," and intractable back and forth between left-leaning and right-leaning media organizations "despite the inherent uncertainty in the footage itself."

As the backlash intensified, the parents of Covington High School junior Nicholas Sandmann, the one CNN described as "smiling young man in a red Make America Great Again hat," retained the services of Louisville-based RunSwitch Public Relations, a company that specializes in crisis management. They released a January 21 statement on behalf of Sandmann, in which he said misinformation and "outright lies" were being spread about the incident. According to him, the situation began when a group of African-American protesters directed insults at the students, and the students responded with school spirit chants. Sandmann said that he was confused when Phillips and other Native Americans subsequently approached him and the other students, and that he tried to remain calm to avoid trouble. He said he "did not witness or hear any students chant 'build that wall' or anything hateful or racist at any time."

Taitano said she also heard the students chant "build that wall" and "Trump 2020", but such chants were not audible in videos reviewed by CNN. The January 21 PR statement denied that the students chanted "Build the wall". Phillips said that he had heard the students chanting "build that wall" which was one of the principal concerns of the Indigenous Peoples March. In a brief interview on Twitter, he said "This is Indigenous Land you know, we're not supposed to have walls here. We never did for millenniums (sic) before anybody else came here we never had walls. We never had a prison. We always took care of our elders and took care of our children. We always provided for them, we taught them right from wrong. I wish I could see that energy in that young mass of young men down there. To put that energy into making this country really great—helping those that are hungry..." Some others affiliated with the March described the group of boys surrounding Phillips as appearing threatening due to their numbers, actions, and "Make America Great Again" attire.

Alison Lundergan Grimes, Secretary of State of Kentucky, described the scene as "horrific" and said the students' actions did not reflect Kentucky's values. She wrote, "I refuse to shame these children. Instead I turn to the adults that are teaching them and those that are silently letting others promote this behavior. This is not the Kentucky I know and love. We can do better and it starts with better leadership."

The Washington Post described the Indigenous Peoples March as "meaningful", and an example of how Native Americans will not be silenced. The article drew attention to Donald Trump's joking about the Wounded Knee Massacre to mock the senior United States senator from Massachusetts, Elizabeth Warren.

Vulture writer Erik Abriss, who tweeted that he wanted the Covington students and their parents to die, was fired from his second job at INE Entertainment. Film producer Jack Morrissey, who had suggested the "MAGAkids go screaming, hats first, into the woodchipper," later apologized for his "fast, profoundly stupid tweet".

Author and professor at UC Riverside Reza Aslan tweeted about Sandmann: "Have you ever seen a more punchable face than this kid's?" The tweet was deleted roughly one year later.

=== Following full video release ===
A longer hour-and-a-half-long video was made public on Sunday, January 20. The longer video revealed more information about the incident, including the five Hebrew Israelites and their taunting of the students. The New York Times January 22 compilation shows that the whole interaction only lasted ten minutes.

In the wake of the publication of the longer video, CNN Business reporter Donie O'Sullivan described the Twitter video uploaded by "2020fight" as the one that "helped frame the news cycle" of the previous days, and characterized the video as a "deliberate attempt" to mislead and "manipulate the public conversation on Twitter"—a violation of Twitter rules. According to Molly McKew, an information warfare researcher, the tweet had been boosted by a network of anonymous Twitter accounts to amplify the story.

The newly revealed information of the whole incident shown through the longer videos created confusion in the ongoing reporting: while some still believed the students were partially responsible for poor attitudes, others felt that the students had been maligned by the initial coverage and that several other actors in the event were to blame for the net result.

The organizers of the March for Life initially released a statement criticizing the students' "reprehensible" behavior. But the organizers rescinded the statement on January 20, saying "It is clear from new footage and additional accounts that there is more to this story than the original video captured."

Chase Iron Eyes, a spokesperson for the Indigenous Peoples March and an attorney for the Lakota People's Law Project who witnessed the incident, said that "Conservative people are fearful now—with the election to [C]ongress of our first two Native American women, Deb Haaland and Sharice Davids, and so many other powerful women... But yesterday the world saw, whether it was live media or social media, the fight ahead of us can be won—if we are united." Another march organizer, Nathalie Farfan, said, "The good news is, that connection to the sacred may have resonated with some of the Catholic youths. What is not being shown on [the KC Noland January 18 video] is that the same youth and a few others became emotional because of the power, resilience and love we inherently carry in our DNA. Our day on those steps ended with a round dance, while we chanted, 'We are still here.'"

On January 21, The New York Times report from Covington said that the local community had focused its energy on "absolving the students of any wrongdoing" in the incident, having begun "to see itself as facing a politically motivated siege".

U.S. Representative Thomas Massie, whose district includes Covington Catholic High School, wrote that after watching videos from four different cameras he believed the media had misrepresented the incident, and that "In the context of everything that was going on (which the media hasn't shown) the parents and mentors of these boys should be proud, not ashamed, of their kids' behavior."

The House Intelligence Committee on January 22 asked Twitter to provide information on the reason why the first video went viral.

On January 22, shortly after tweeting it, comedian Kathy Griffin deleted a Twitter message in which she accused Covington basketball players making an OK gesture of "throwing up the new nazi sign". The same day Jim Carrey tweeted an art work labeling the Covington students as "baby snakes".

In a January 22 tweet, President Trump said the Covington students "have become symbols of Fake News and how evil it can be."

After several conflicting media interviews were given by Nathan Phillips, NBC's Savannah Guthrie interviewed Covington High School junior Nicholas Sandmann, airing on the Today Show on the morning of January 23. While Sandmann did not feel a need to apologize for his actions, he expressed respect for Phillips and a desire to talk to him. In hindsight, he wished that he had simply walked away. In his interview with NBC, Phillips said that while "Sandmann owes many people an apology", as he continues to believe the "students were 'mocking' Native Americans, and Sandmann 'was the leader of that'", he forgives those involved. Phillips also acknowledged that both of them had received death threats since the incident. Guthrie was criticized, alternately, for giving Sandmann a national platform and for asking Sandmann if he should apologize to Phillips.

On January 23, CNN's Kirsten Powers deleted her Twitter app after she was criticized and, in her own words, "harassed" on Twitter after stating a day prior that "watching all the videos (which I did) does not change the fundamental problem: the boys disrespecting an Indigenous elder." The same day, White House Press Secretary Sarah Huckabee Sanders gave a statement saying, "the idea that anybody could take joy in the destruction of young kids is absolutely outrageous to me"; her remarks were criticized, with critics pointing to the Trump administration's family separation policy.

== Analysis of media coverage ==
The news media has been criticized for how it covered the incident, specifically for their initial reporting of the story based on various social media posts without fully investigating what occurred and subsequently fueling controversy and outrage over the incident. Some commentators have linked the coverage of the media and the response of part of the public opinion to the incident to anti-Catholic sentiments and rhetoric, given the fact that the religion of the students was also a target of insults.

The media began to cover the story after it received a massive amount of attention on social media. At first, most media coverage neglected to provide key details to the story. Two days later, after a longer video was released, media outlets began to withdraw from their initial analysis and made edits clarifying the changes. For example, CNN titled an article "Teens in Make America Great Again hats taunted a Native American elder at the Lincoln Memorial", but upon revision, the new headline read "Teen in confrontation with Native American elder says he was trying to defuse the situation". The New York Times's original coverage was titled "Boys in 'Make America Great Again' Hats Mob Native Elder at Indigenous Peoples March" before following up the next day with "Fuller Picture Emerges of Viral Video of Native American Man and Catholic Students". Some organizations did not change their original writings, but added a notice directing users to newer articles with a more complete account.

== Legal ==
=== Defamation lawsuits ===
==== The Washington Post ====
Sandmann's family retained lawyers who, in February 2019, filed a US$250 million defamation lawsuit on behalf of Sandmann against The Washington Post. The suit accuses the Post of publishing seven "false and defamatory articles". The complaint alleged that the Post wanted to lead a "mainstream and social media mob of bullies which attacked, vilified, and threatened" Sandmann, that the Post wrongfully targeted and bullied Sandmann "because he was the white, Catholic student wearing a red 'Make America Great Again' souvenir cap on a school field trip" and that the Post "knew and intended that its allegedly defamatory accusations would be republished by others." A spokeswoman for The Washington Post announced that the paper would defend itself against the lawsuit.

The lawsuit against The Washington Post was initially dismissed on July 26, 2019, because the plaintiff's claims that he was falsely accused of racist conduct "is not supported by the plain language in the article", and that otherwise the published material was opinion, protected by the First Amendment. After Sandmann's lawyers amended the complaint, the suit was reopened on October 28, 2019. The judge stood by his earlier decision that 30 of the Post's 33 statements targeted by the complaint were not libelous, but agreed that a further review was required for three statements that "state that (Sandmann) 'blocked' Nathan Phillips and 'would not allow him to retreat'". On July 24, 2020, The Washington Post settled the lawsuit with Sandmann. The terms of the settlement have not been made public.

==== CNN ====
Sandmann's lawyers filed a second lawsuit on his behalf against CNN on March 12, 2019, seeking US$275 million in damages, for allegedly "vicious" and "direct attacks" towards Sandmann. On January 7, 2020, the lawsuit was settled. The terms of the settlement have not been made public.

==== NBCUniversal ====
A third lawsuit was filed on May 1, 2019, seeking US$275 million defamation lawsuit on behalf of Sandmann against NBCUniversal. On November 22, 2019, a judge rejected NBC's attempt to dismiss the lawsuit against it. The lawsuit was settled on December 17, 2021, with Sandmann stating that the terms of the settlement were confidential.

==== Other media lawsuits ====
Other lawsuits have been filed against The New York Times, Rolling Stone, ABC, and CBS. On July 26, 2022, U.S. District Judge William Bertelsman, a federal judge in Kentucky, granted summary judgment motions in favor of these media companies. The court concluded that the reporting of Phillips's statements that Sandmann "blocked" him and "wouldn't allow [him] to retreat" were objectively unverifiable and thus unactionable opinions. The Sixth Circuit upheld the ruling on appeal in August 2023, and the Supreme Court denied to hear Sandmann's case in March 2024.

==== Public figures ====
On August 2, 2019, a suit was filed against a dozen public figures seeking $1.4–4.8 million, on behalf of eight unnamed students who claim defamation. Of those figures, the suits against Senator Elizabeth Warren and Representative Deb Haaland were dismissed based on the principle of legislative immunity.

== Post-incident actions ==
=== National shrine protest ===
On January 20, 2019, Nathan Phillips, along with "several dozen" others, attempted to enter the Basilica of the National Shrine of the Immaculate Conception during Mass in an effort to disrupt it, but were prohibited from entering "due to the disruption it would have caused during the solemn Mass" and because "they did not intend to share in the celebration of Mass."

After being told to leave the property by police, the protesters gathered across the street.

=== February 2019 private detective agency investigation ===
In February 2019, the Covington Diocese released the investigation report of a private detective agency hired by the diocese and the high school, stating that the report exonerated the students.

=== 2020 RNC speech ===
Sandmann gave a short speech at the 2020 Republican National Convention during which he recounted the incident from his perspective and stated his belief that mainstream media outlets are biased. Sandmann was subsequently hired by Mitch McConnell's re-election campaign.
