= AIM Song =

Native American intertribal song

Flag of the American Indian Movement

The "AIM Song" is the name given to a Native American intertribal song. Although the song originally did not have a name, it gained its current alias through association with the American Indian Movement. During the takeover of Wounded Knee, it was used as the anthem of the "Independent Oglala Nation."

== History ==
The origins of the song itself are uncertain, and there are various theories attributing the song to various locations across North America and various points in history.

Edward Benton-Banai, from the Lac Courte Oreilles Band of Ojibwe Indians, co-founded the movement in 1972, and is rumoured as the songwriter. The song could have been inspired by a traditional Ojibwe honoring song, known as the Airforce Song.

Severt Young Bear, an Oglala Lakota from Porcupine, South Dakota, was also involved in AIM. As the lead singer of the Porcupine Singers, he made the song popular in the early 1970s. Although he admits he did not write it, collaboration between himself and Benton-Banai could have helped the song to develop. Although Severt does give credit to Drury Cook (A Mnicoujou Lakota and a member of the Cheyenne River Sioux Tribe) for possibly making the AIM song, which at time of selecting a song, other songs were brought to AIM leaders as possible songs, Porcupine Singers performed the song for AIM leaders and the song was accepted by the Leaders at that time as the AIM Song or Anthem (Severt quoted this in his book "Standing in the Light"). It may have been written as a victory song after the AIM protest in Gordon, Nebraska regarding the murder of Raymond Yellow Thunder resulted in criminal charges and the dismissal of the Chief of Police

Several Ktunaxa Elders (Marianne Michel, Leo Williams, Wilfred Jacobs, and Joe Skookum) were tape recorded at a powwow in 1981 at the Lower Kootenay Band at Creston British Columbia and stated that the song people are using in association with AIM and the Constitutional Express Constitution Express in 1980 which went from Vancouver to Ottawa is a Ktunaxa warrior song. Two of the Elders stated, "It is very important to me". The Ktunaxa songs are almost all melodic and most do not include the Ktunaxa language, which is in the same style as the "AIM Song".

== Form ==
The song comprises non-lexical vocables (abstract sounds rather than semantic words). This involves the heavy use of vowels and semi-vowels, as consonants would bias the song towards a particular tribe (whose language uses those consonants). The song is intended as an intertribal, therefore it is deliberately not language-specific.

As is characteristic of many Native American songs, the song involves vocal harmony. The men are backed up by around twice the number of women. The female vocal line becomes particularly prominent in this repeated motif:

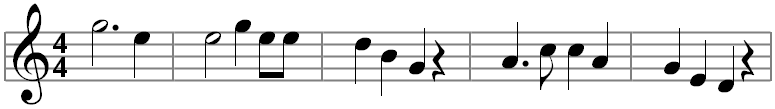

The song is usually accompanied with a steady beat on a traditional man’s drum. It has also been heard with the accompaniment of a water drum, which suggests the song originated amongst the Plains tribes.

== Uses ==
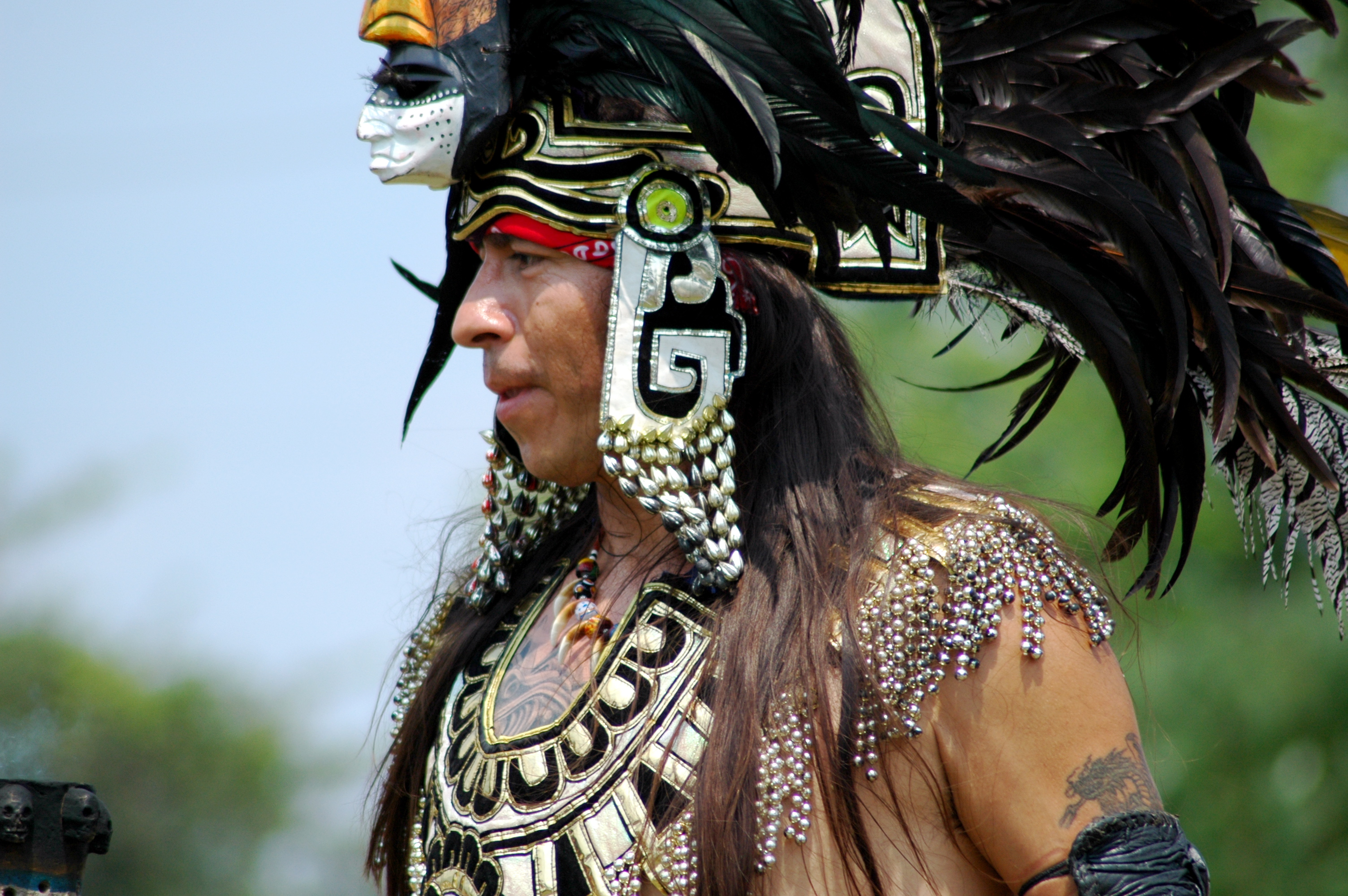
An intertribal powwow.

This song was sung by Omaha leader Nathan Phillips at an Indigenous People's March in Washington DC in a viral video incident to defuse a tense situation between a group of 200 Catholic high school boys and a group of four Black Israelites on January 18, 2019.
