= Laura Cottingham =

Laura Cottingham (born 1959) is an American art critic, curator and visual artist. Her most recent book is Angst essen Seele auf on Rainer Werner Fassbinder published by the British Film Institute in 2005. Her work has been exhibited in galleries and museums throughout Europe and in New York City, her best known videos being Not For Sale, 1998 and The Anita Pallenberg Story, 2000. She curated "NowHere," for the Louisiana Museum of Art, Denmark in 1996 and "Vraiment Feminisme et art," for Le Magasin in Grenoble, France in 1997. She lives in New York City.

== Biography ==
Laura Cottingham is a graduate of Notre Dame Academy, in Park Hills, Kentucky and of the University of Chicago. In 1981-82, she was a Helena Rubenstein Fellow in the Whitney Museum of American Art's Independent Study Program. Her activities have been primarily concentrated in Europe—including Austria, Germany, France, Spain, England, Scotland, the Netherlands, Denmark, and Sweden—where she has published, exhibited and lectured widely. Her work is concerned with reconsidering the meaning of art in light of the countercultural values of circa 1968. Her influences include Fluxus, Rock and roll, punk (Dee Dee Ramone kissed her), ballet, radical feminism, Gay rights, Black Power, Zen and Gestalt.

Aside from Angst essen Seele auf, Cottingham's other books include Seeing Through the Seventies: Essays on Feminism and Art (Amsterdam, 2000); Lesbians Are So Chic... (London, 1996) and How many 'bad' feminists does it take to change a lightbulb? (New York, 1994), also in French (Lyon, 1999). She is best known for her work recuperating Seventies Feminist Art and has published extensively on many of the artists of that period, as well as on artists of her own generation.

Her film Not For Sale: Feminism and Art in the USA during the 1970s (1998) was first shown at Apexart, New York in 1998, and is in the collection of the Museum of Modern Art, New York. The Anita Pallenberg Story (2000) is a filmic satire on the international art scene that features Cottingham playing Mick Jagger; other art world personalities likewise appear in this Warhol-like drama, including collector Peter Norton ("Norton Utilities") who plays a pizza delivery boy. "Pallenberg" is the subject of a website: "LOVE, SEX, FAME and the LIFE OF THE IMAGE: On the making of the Anita Pallenberg Story" at www.haussite.net, the Kuenstlerhaus Stuttgart's website. The Anita Pallenberg Story was featured in an exhibition of the same title at Artists Space in New York in 2007.

In 2006, she co-curated Sweden's annual national exhibition for the Lilevalchs Konsthalle, Stockholm.

She has taught at the graduate visual arts programs at Rutgers University, the School of Visual Arts, Pratt Institute and Columbia University, New York as well as at the Danish Royal Academy and The Cooper Union in New York City.

In 2000, Cottingham performed as a dancer with the Stanley Love Performance Group in New York.

== Cottingham in pop culture ==
Her name appears in the lyrics of the Le Tigre song "Hot Topic."

She often appeared as a contestant on "Name That Painting," a Manhattan cable television show.

== Bibliography ==
- How many "bad" feminists does it take to change a lightbulb? (New York: Sixty Percent Solution, 1994) [French edition, 2002, ISBN 2-912631-01-7]
- Lesbians are so chic…That We Are Not Really Lesbians at All (New York: Cassell, 1996) ISBN 0-304-33721-8
- Seeing Through the Seventies: Essays on Feminism and Art (New York: G+B Arts International, 1999) ISBN 90-5701-212-X
- Angst essen Seele auf (London: British Film Institute, 2005) ISBN 1-84457-071-1

== Videography ==
- NOT FOR SALE: Feminism and Art in the USA during the 1970s, 1998, 90 minutes. Premiered at the Museum of Modern Art, New York in 1998; subsequently exhibited in Los Angeles, Vienna, London, Paris, Munich, Berlin, San Antonio, San Sebastian (S), Utrecht (NL), Dublin, Ft. Worth (TX), Cambridge (UK), etc.
- The Anita Pallenberg Story, 2000, 77 minutes. Featuring Laura Cottingham as Mick Jagger (and Brian Jones) along with a star-studded cast of international fine art flunkies including art dealers Colin de Land and Gavin Brown; collector and software genius Peter Norton ("Norton Utilities"); gallery artists from Europe and the US, including, in the title role, Cosima von Bonin.
- Various Shorts, since 1992, including special features on Manhattan Cable and additional gallery and museum works.
