= Amy McGrath =

American Marine Corps fighter pilot and politician

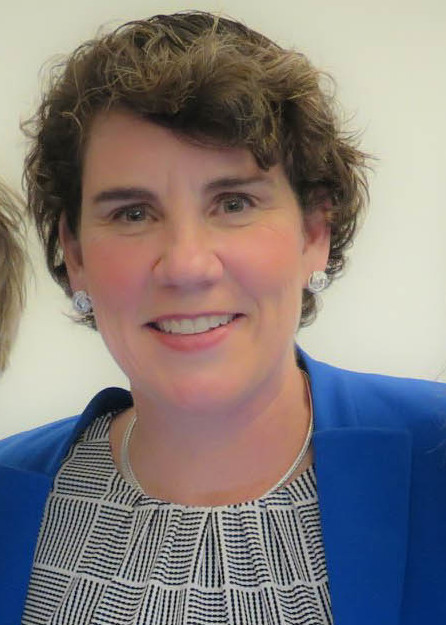
- McGrath in 2019

Personal details
- Born: June 3, 1975 (age 51) Cincinnati, Ohio, U.S.
- Party: Independent (before 2017); Democratic (2017–present)
- Spouse: Erik Henderson (m. 2009)
- Children: 3
- Education: United States Naval Academy (BS); Georgetown University (GradCert); Johns Hopkins University (MA)
- Website: Campaign website

Military service
- Allegiance: United States
- Branch/service: United States Marine Corps
- Years of service: 1997–2017
- Rank: Lieutenant Colonel
- Battles/wars: Iraq War; War in Afghanistan
- Awards: Meritorious Service Medal; Air Medal (8); Navy and Marine Corps Commendation Medal; Navy and Marine Corps Achievement Medal; See full list

Amy Melinda McGrath (born June 3, 1975) is an American former Marine fighter pilot and political candidate from Kentucky. McGrath was the first woman to fly a combat mission for the Marine Corps and the first woman to pilot the F/A-18 in a combat mission. She was inspired to be a fighter pilot after studying World War II aviation in middle school and taking family trips to Wright-Patterson Air Force Base. During her 20 years of service in the Marine Corps, McGrath flew 89 combat missions against al-Qaeda and the Taliban.

Toward the end of her service, McGrath worked domestically as a political adviser, liaison officer, and instructor at the United States Naval Academy. Following retirement from military service in 2017, McGrath entered politics. She was the Democratic nominee for Kentucky's 6th congressional district in the 2018 election, losing to incumbent Republican Andy Barr by a margin of 51% to 47.8%. In July 2019, McGrath announced her campaign in the 2020 election for the United States Senate, challenging incumbent Mitch McConnell. In a close primary, McGrath defeated state representative Charles Booker to gain the nomination of the Democratic Party. McGrath outraised McConnell by more than $32 million, but lost the general election by nearly 20 points. In October 2025, McGrath declared her intent to run as a Democrat in Kentucky's 2026 Senate election. She lost to Booker in the primary.

== Early life and education ==
McGrath was born in Cincinnati, Ohio. She grew up in Edgewood, Kentucky, just outside of Covington, the youngest of three children. Her father, Donald McGrath, was a high school teacher who taught in Cincinnati for 40 years. Her mother, Marianne McGrath, is a psychiatrist who was one of the first women to graduate from the University of Kentucky's medical school.

McGrath graduated in 1993 from Notre Dame Academy in Park Hills, Kentucky where she played varsity soccer, basketball, and baseball, and was captain of the soccer team her senior year. In her senior year, she received an appointment to the United States Naval Academy, the same year Congress lifted the Combat Exclusion Policy that banned women from becoming fighter pilots.

McGrath graduated from the United States Naval Academy in 1997 with a Bachelor of Science in political science. As a student, McGrath was the student director of the Naval Academy Foreign Affairs Conference and a member of the academy's women's varsity soccer team.

McGrath received a graduate certificate in legislative studies from Georgetown University in 2011. In 2014, she earned a Master of Arts in international and global security studies from Johns Hopkins University.

== Military career ==
=== Training and pre-deployment (1997–2002) ===
After graduating from the Naval Academy, at the age of 21, McGrath was commissioned as a second lieutenant in the Marine Corps. In 1999, McGrath completed flight school and started her career as a Weapons Systems Officer (WSO), coordinating weapons including air-to-air AMRAAM missiles and heat-seeking Sidewinders. She was assigned to Marine All-Weather Fighter Attack Squadron 121. When McGrath and fellow Marine pilot Jaden Kim joined VMFA-121, they became the first female aviators to join the squadron. During this same time, McGrath was also part of Marine Fighter Attack Training Squadron 101.

=== Service overseas (2002–2011) ===
In March 2002, McGrath was deployed to Manas, Kyrgyzstan, for a six-month tour of duty, during which she flew 51 combat missions in an F/A-18D in Operation Enduring Freedom in Afghanistan. She was the first woman to fly a combat mission in the United States Marine Corps. In January 2003, stationed in Kuwait, McGrath flew in support of Operation Iraqi Freedom in Iraq, where she provided air support to ground troops and conducted reconnaissance and air strikes.

After being promoted to captain, McGrath completed flight school in 2004, becoming a pilot. During 2005 and 2006, she was deployed on a second tour of duty over Afghanistan with VMFA 121. During this time she became the first woman to fly in an F/A-18 in combat for the U.S. Marine Corps. In 2007, she was promoted from captain to major. From 2007 to 2009, she was deployed to East Asia. During this same time, McGrath was also part of Fighter-Attack Squadron 106. In 2010, she served a second tour in Afghanistan with the 3rd Marine Aircraft Wing in Helmand Province.

During her military career, McGrath flew over 2,000 flight hours on over 85 combat missions. She also flew in exercises in the U.S., Egypt, Australia, Korea, and Japan.

=== Return to the United States (2011–2017) ===
In 2011, McGrath returned to the United States and was assigned as a congressional fellow for Representative Susan Davis's office in Washington, D.C., as a defense and foreign affairs advisor for a year. Davis was chair and ranking member on the Subcommittee on Military Personnel of the House Armed Services Committee.

From 2012 to 2014, McGrath worked at the Headquarters Marine Corps in The Pentagon, as a Marine Corps liaison to the Department of State and the United States Agency for International Development.

From 2014 to 2017, McGrath served as a senior political science instructor at the United States Naval Academy.

After reaching the 20-year service mark, McGrath retired from the armed forces on June 1, 2017, at the rank of lieutenant colonel.

== 2018 U.S. House campaign ==
On August 1, 2017, McGrath announced she was running for the United States House of Representatives from Kentucky's 6th congressional district as a Democrat in the 2018 election against incumbent representative Andy Barr, a Republican. McGrath's campaign announcement video attracted national attention.

McGrath said that she saw former representative Ben Chandler, Barr's Democratic predecessor, speak at the Naval Academy and she had reached out to him for help when she began considering running for election.

To focus on rural voters, McGrath set up multiple field offices in less populated areas of Kentucky. The Democratic Congressional Campaign Committee (DCCC) supported McGrath's opponent in the primary. McGrath was endorsed by Representative Seth Moulton, Senator Kirsten Gillibrand, and a veterans' political action committee (PAC)s VoteVets.org and With Honor.

McGrath won the Democratic Party primary on May 22, 2018. She defeated Jim Gray, the mayor of Lexington, and a well-known figure who was one of the first openly gay Kentuckians elected to public office. She won all 18 rural counties in the district with the exception of Fayette County. After the win, Gray endorsed McGrath, as did the DCCC via their Red to Blue campaign. Former Vice President Joe Biden called to congratulate McGrath.

McGrath was defeated in the November 2018 general election by Barr, who won 51% of the vote to McGrath's 47.8%.

== 2020 U.S. Senate campaign ==
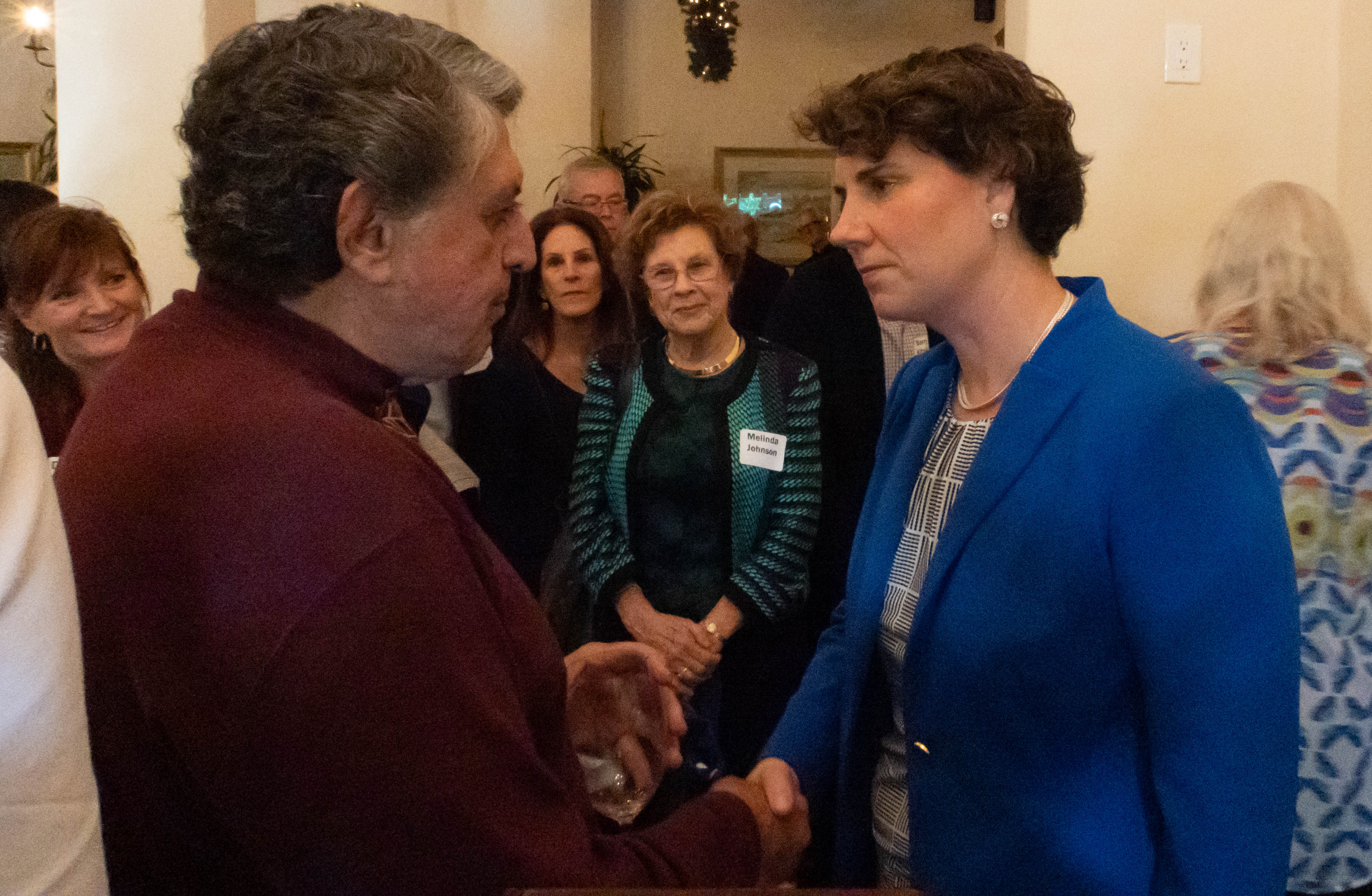
McGrath speaks with supporters during a campaign event, 2019

On July 9, 2019, McGrath announced on Twitter that she was running for the United States Senate for Kentucky in the 2020 election, challenging incumbent senator Mitch McConnell, a Republican and the Majority Leader. McGrath raised $3.5 million in her first week. In her launch video, McGrath stated that "bit by bit, year by year, [McConnell has] turned Washington into something we all despise – where dysfunction and chaos are political weapons."

McGrath endorsed Joe Biden's 2020 presidential campaign ahead of the Democratic Party's Iowa caucuses.

McGrath's campaign reported raising $12.8 million in the first quarter of 2020, outraising McConnell, who reported raising $7.4 million in the same period. As of September 2020, donors had contributed $43 million to the Amy for America PAC and $39.6 million to the Amy McGrath for Senate PAC through ActBlue.

McGrath won the Democratic nomination with 45% of the primary vote. McGrath's vote share skewed towards rural areas: she won all but five counties, with those counties being among the most populous in the commonwealth. Other candidates in the primary included Kentucky representative Charles Booker, who received 43%, and retired Marine Mike Broihier, who won 5%. Broihier and Booker both ultimately endorsed McGrath.

In September, McGrath was endorsed by Kentucky's sitting governor, Andy Beshear. She was also endorsed by the Kentucky Education Association, a teachers union affiliated with the National Education Association and the largest professional group in Kentucky. On October 12, she was endorsed in the general election by the Lexington Herald-Leader.

In September, McGrath released a five-point plan for Kentucky involving the federal response to COVID-19, health care, infrastructure, racial equality, and corruption. On October 12, McGrath and McConnell held a debate. McGrath criticized McConnell's response to the COVID-19 pandemic, arguing that he should have been able to pass an additional relief bill over Democratic objections, as was done with the Tax Cuts and Jobs Act of 2017.

McGrath outraised McConnell by more than $32 million. Nevertheless, on November 3, McGrath lost to McConnell by a margin of nearly 20 percentage points.

== 2026 U.S. Senate campaign ==
On October 6, 2025, McGrath declared her candidacy for U.S. Senate in Kentucky in 2026. On May 19, 2026, she lost the Democratic nomination to Charles Booker.

== Political positions ==
In her 2018 House and 2020 Senate races, McGrath identified herself as a moderate Democrat. McGrath considers herself a fiscal conservative. Left-leaning news outlets, including Rolling Stone, have criticized McGrath for being too conservative, as have her progressive primary opponents, Charles Booker and Mike Broihier. McGrath has stated "I want to do what's best for Kentucky, and when President Trump has good ideas, I'm going to be for them. To me it's not about your political party, it's not about wearing a red jersey or blue jersey."

=== Healthcare ===
McGrath supports the Affordable Care Act (ACA) and efforts to preserve and improve it. She has said "we have a very complex health care system in America and right now we have the Affordable Care Act, that just came into effect a few years ago. ... I believe, as with every major piece of legislation in this country, we should try to make it work." She supports a public option for health care, similar to the insurance plan offered to military veterans, and supports allowing people over 55 to opt-in to Medicare. McGrath opposes Medicare for All, saying that she prefers to improve on the ACA and that she opposes the abolition of private health insurance. During her 2018 House campaign, she had indicated she liked the idea of single-payer healthcare plans, but thought they just were not feasible.

=== Economy ===
McGrath opposed the Tax Cuts and Jobs Act of 2017. She favored making permanent the temporary tax cuts for the middle class contained in the bill.

McGrath supports investing in infrastructure in eastern Kentucky to offset the economic impacts of the coal industry’s continuing decline. She has specifically focused on the need to bring high-speed broadband Internet to rural areas that currently lack it.

=== Environment ===
McGrath said that climate change "disrupt[s] the environment" and harms the economy. She has also called it an issue of national security, and has stated "our military is already testing, adapting, and researching how to operate and succeed in these rapidly changing environments" brought on by climate change. However, she has promised not to support "legislation that doesn’t have a plan for keeping jobs around and supporting our communities."

=== Guns ===
McGrath has stated her support for the Second Amendment and the right to bear arms, noting she "went to combat with a nine millimeter strapped to my chest and a 20 millimeter cannon on the front of my jet." She favors stronger background checks on firearm sales, as well as "banning sales to those on terror watch lists, and continuing federal research on the gun violence epidemic."

=== Race relations ===
At an August 2020 meeting with Black church leaders, McGrath stated support of widespread policing reforms, including federal funding for body cameras, requiring independent investigations into officer-involved shootings, and creating a national database of police officers who are fired for misconduct. She supports national standards including banning chokeholds, banning no-knock search warrants in federal drug cases and supporting independent investigations when warranted. At a meeting with protestors in the Breonna Taylor case, McGrath called to "tackle the systemic racism" in the US and called for more details on Taylor's case to be released to the public.

=== Immigration ===
McGrath has called for comprehensive immigration reform. McGrath opposes building a physical barrier or wall along the entire US border with Mexico, saying it would be "very expensive" and not be effective, and "it would take decades to build and then you can just defeat it with a ladder. We can secure our border with better technology" such as drone patrols. In a debate on KET during the Democratic primary of her 2018 campaign, McGrath displayed a willingness to compromise on immigration issues. She opposes abolishing Immigrations and Customs Enforcement.

=== COVID-19 pandemic response ===
In October 2020, McGrath supported an additional round of COVID-19 pandemic stimulus funding, including another round of stimulus checks to individuals, and aid to state and local governments that are facing budget shortfalls. She has criticized the response of the Trump administration and Congress to the pandemic, stating they were not honest about the severity of the situation early on.

=== Other domestic issues ===
McGrath opposes late-term abortions. In 2019 she favored the status quo concerning abortion restrictions, saying "there are [currently] enough restrictions on abortion and they're reasonable."

McGrath opposes free college tuition paid for by the government. She does not support defunding the police.

McGrath supports term limits. Specifically, a representative of her 2020 campaign said McGrath "strongly" supports a limit of two terms in the Senate. In the primary, many of the Senators who backed McGrath have spent more than two terms in the Senate. Some of the Senators who backed Charles Booker have not.

=== Foreign policy ===
In 2016, McGrath authored an editorial for Foreign Policy magazine, calling for a thorough investigation of the decision-making process that the U.S. government took leading up to the Iraq War, similar to the British Chilcot Report. She cited the "seven investigations, ... 33 hearings, and ... almost $7 million examining every facet of the disaster in Benghazi, Libya, in which four Americans were killed," and contrasted it with the "4,806 American and coalition members deaths and 32,246 wounded" and estimated $3 trillion spent during the Iraq War, without any investigation.

McGrath has stated that "the major concern for the security of our nation remains the threat of a nuclear device in the hands of a violent non-state actor — so we must be relentless when it comes to seeking nuclear nonproliferation around the world."

== Personal life ==
McGrath was inspired to become a military aviator at a young age, especially after visiting the National Museum of the United States Air Force. She said that she was inspired to be a fighter pilot when she was a seventh grader in middle school, when she studied aviation in World War II, and her family often visited Wright-Patterson Air Force Base.

At age 12, McGrath wrote to her representative and both of her senators to ask why women were not allowed to be fighter pilots. Neither Mitch McConnell nor Wendell Ford replied, and her congressman provided a condescending reply, so McGrath wrote every member of the House Armed Services Committee asking for a change in the law. Representative Pat Schroeder wrote back, encouraging her to keep working towards her dreams, and said that Congress was working on the issue.

In 2009, McGrath married now-retired naval Lieutenant Commander Erik Henderson. The couple has three children. Henderson is a lifelong Republican. The family lives in Georgetown, Kentucky.

In April 2017, McGrath's father died of cancer at the age of 76.

== Honors and awards ==
McGrath has received the following awards and recognition.

Ribbon	Description	Notes
Ribbon of the MSM	Meritorious Service Medal	
Ribbon of the Air Medal	Air Medal	Eight-time recipient
Ribbon of the NMCCM	Navy and Marine Corps Commendation Medal	
Ribbon of the NAM	Navy and Marine Corps Achievement Medal	
Ribbon of the PUC	Presidential Unit Citation	
Ribbon of the ICM	Iraq Campaign Medal	
Ribbon of the ACM	Afghanistan Campaign Medal	

McGrath was inducted into the Kentucky Aviation Hall of Fame on November 12, 2016.

== Works and publications ==
- McGrath, Maj Amy 'Krusty' (March 2013). "Women in Combat: The Bogus Old Arguments Rise Again (A Rebuttal)". Marine Corps Gazette. 97 (3). Archived from the original on July 8, 2018.
- United States Marine Corps (March 1, 2013). United States Marine Corps Interagency Integration Strategy. Marine Corps Service Campaign Plan Annex V. Archived from the original on December 15, 2016.
- McGrath, Amy (May 2014). More for Less: Protecting America's Security Interests Through Soft Power Programs (Thesis/dissertation). Baltimore, MD: Johns Hopkins University. ISBN 9780811735667. OCLC 892343270.

Party political offices
Preceded by Alison Lundergan Grimes	Democratic nominee for U.S. Senator from Kentucky (Class 2); 2020	Succeeded by Charles Booker
