= Israelite School of Universal Practical Knowledge =

Black Hebrew Israelite sect

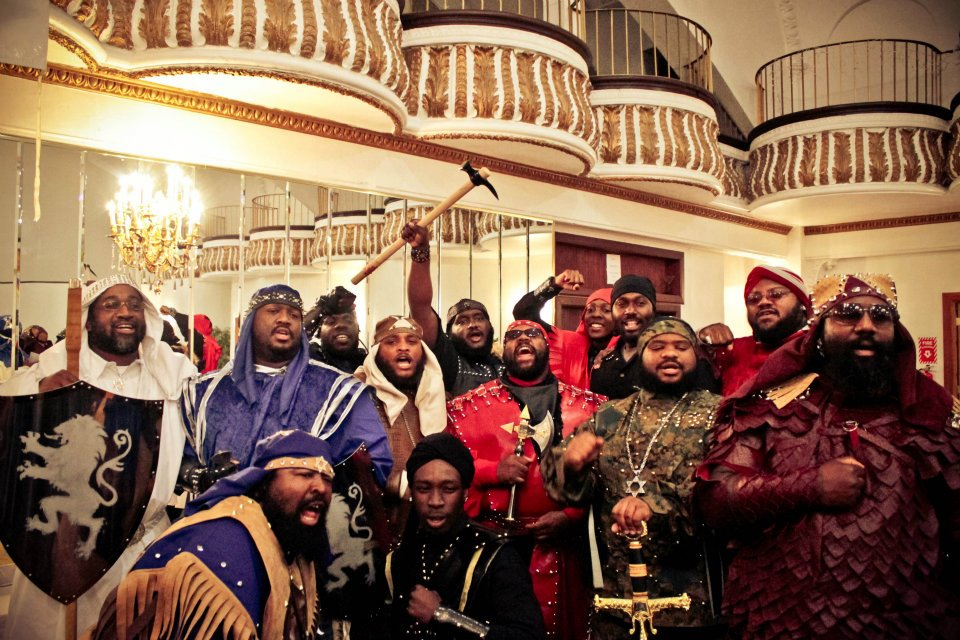
- The ISUPK High Holy Day in Harlem, New York City, New York, Passover 2012
- Classification: Syncretic: Judaism and Christianity
- Orientation: Hebrew Israelite
- Scripture: Hebrew Bible; New Testament
- Headquarters: Upper Darby, Pennsylvania, U.S.
- Official website: isupk.com

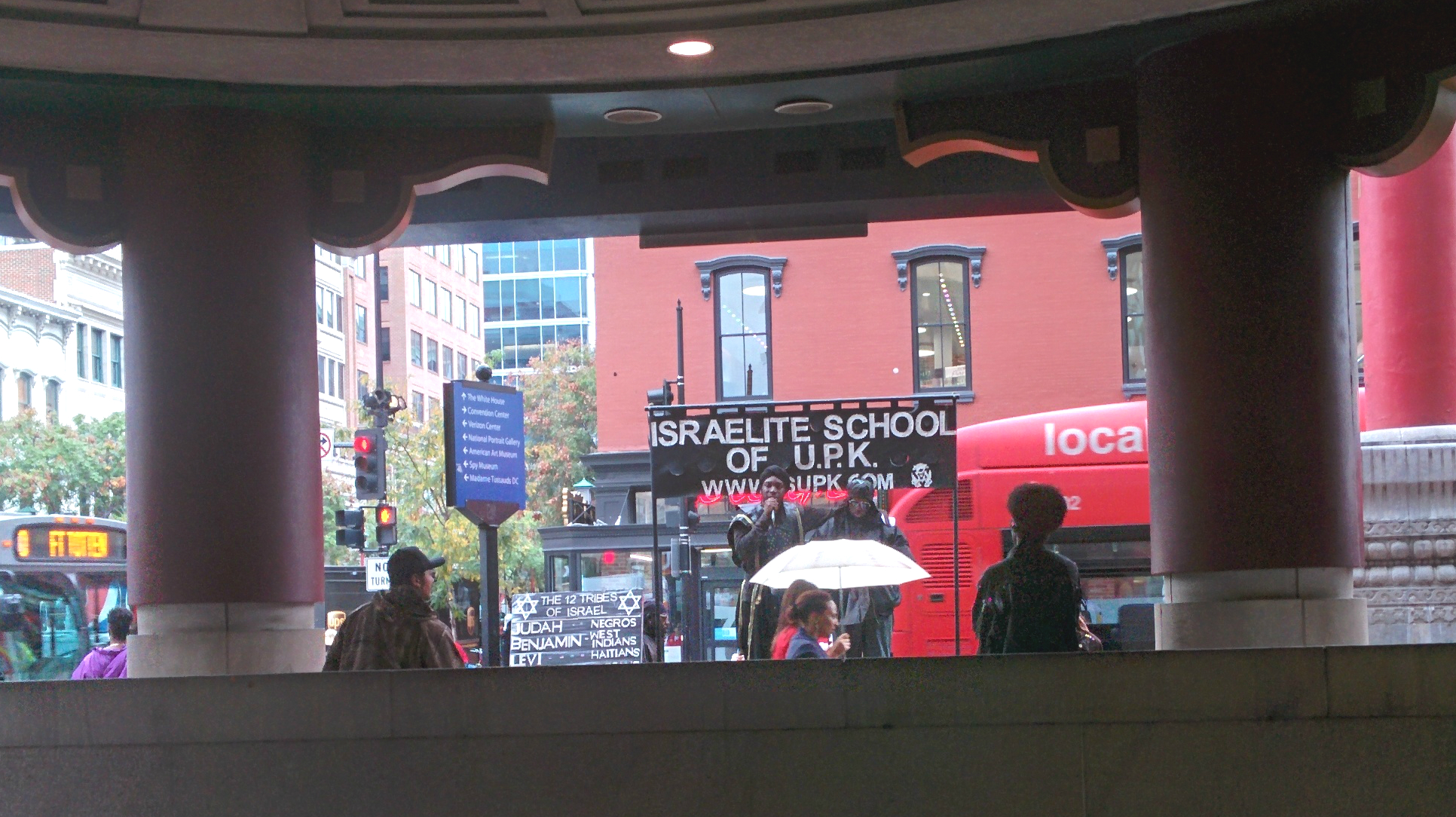
The ISUPK performing in Washington, D.C., on October 10, 2014, at the corner of H and 7th Street N.W.

Israelite School of Universal Practical Knowledge (ISUPK) is an American non-profit organization and Black supremacist, extremist religious sect based in Upper Darby, Pennsylvania.

== Description and history ==
The ISUPK group is part of the Black Hebrew Israelite movement, which regards American/Caribbean Blacks, Hispanics and Native Americans as descendants of the Twelve Tribes of Israel. The Southern Poverty Law Center (SPLC) has designated the ISUPK a hate group, citing its extremist ideology and Black supremacist rhetoric.

The ISUPK group is a part of the One West Camp movement, an offshoot of the Israelite Church of God in Jesus Christ, and uses a variation on the former name of that group. Alongside numerous other sects and organizations within the Black Hebrew Israelite movement, ISUPK expounds extremist, Black supremacist, religious antisemitic, and anti-white racist beliefs, as well as homophobic, transphobic, and sexist beliefs.

== Appearances in media ==
In 2022, The Real Black Sabbath was released. It is a documentary by British journalist Harry Robinson covering the beliefs and practices of the ISUPK, focusing on the Oklahoma branch of the school. The film won the award for 'Most Inspirational Film' at the 2022 Oregon Documentary Film Festival and 'Best Oklahoma Film' at the 2022 Southwest Center Film Festival.

In 2023, media reported that a woman of Palestinian descent was arrested in Indianapolis after crashing her car into a building affiliated with ISUPK, having mistaken it for a school officially linked to the State of Israel. The ISUPK is opposed to the state of Israel.

== Volume controversy ==
ISUPK has demonstrated many times at the corner of Seventh and H Streets in Washington, D.C., since 2004, but residents complain that the group amplifies its open-air preaching to more than 90 decibels and that its message is offensive. Some homeowners say that the group accuses white and gay people of destroying historically Black neighborhoods, and at least one resident has complained of being called a "cracker, a slave owner, [and] a white devil," but they reiterate that the volume of the group's message, rather than the message's content, is the real problem.

The ISUPK's volume and the volume of other groups prompted Washington's municipal government to consider passing an ordinance in order to "resolve the issue." The measure would have limited the volume of daytime noncommercial speech to 70 decibels, but it died because of free-speech and labor union striking concerns. ISUPK's regional director, General Yahanna, defended the group, saying that residents' real issue was not sound, but the content of the group's message. The group identifies its message as saving local residents' souls and discouraging people from drugs and crime; it regards its separatist teachings as the real objection which residents have.
