= One West Camp =

Subgroup of Black Hebrew Israelite groups

The One West Camp is a great subdivision of Hebrew Israelite groups that believe in the Old Testament, the New Testament and the exclusive identification of the Twelve Tribes of Israel with ethnic communities of Black, Latin American, and Native American descent in the Americas.

== History ==
This ideological faction of the Hebrew Israelite movement is named after a long-term school address, which was located at One West 125th Street in Harlem in New York City, originally known as the 'Israeli School of Tanakh', later renamed the 'Israeli Church of Universal Practical Knowledge', then again the 'Israeli School of Universal Practical Knowledge'. The school has since splintered into numerous "camps", with the New York-based Israelite Church of God in Jesus Christ being the most recent name change, and the Pennsylvania-based Israelite School of Universal Practical Knowledge bearing the most similar name. Most Hebrew Israelite Camps related to the One West Camp do not consider themselves Christians and deny the trinity, as well as the belief that Salvation is for all Nations of the Earth; One West Camps teach that Jesus and most Biblical figures were racially black.

The founder of the first grouping and the movement was Abba Bivens (real name Edward Meredith Bibbins, also known as Eber Ben Yomin), who claimed a former slave taught him that Blacks and Native Americans were actually Israelites while traveling from Pennsylvania to New York. He attended the Judaism-related Commandment Keepers of Harlem for up to twenty years, but ultimately left this group in 1969 due to disagreement over the relevance of the New Testament, to start a group that rejected both Christianity and Judaism.

After Bivens's death in 1973, two members were selected to lead the School: Moshe Ben Chareem and Yaiqab (Yaiqab was another ex-Commandment Keeper). While Bivens founded the One West style of Hebrew Israelism, many of the specific doctrines that typify it were created by Yaiqab's son Ahrahyah, including a reliance on the King James Bible, the Twelve Tribes Chart which assigned the peoples of the Americas to specific Israelite tribes, and the new form of Hebrew known as Lashawan Qadash (Holy Tongue).

== Present day ==
One West Camp groups are known for open-air preaching and protests, and attracted media attention with the January 2019 Lincoln Memorial confrontation which included a small New York-based group. The great majority of Black Hebrew Israelite groups outside of One West Camp and Nation of Yahweh do not share these beliefs.
