= Covington Catholic High School =

Location
- 1600 Dixie Highway; Park Hills, Kentucky 41011; United States; 39°3′58″N 84°31′59″W

Information
- Other names: CCH; CovCath
- Type: Private high school
- Motto: Latin: Pro Deo et patria (For God and country)
- Religious affiliation: Roman Catholic
- Established: 1925; 101 years ago
- Founders: Francis William Howard; George Sauer
- Oversight: Roman Catholic Diocese of Covington
- NCES School ID: 00515778
- Principal: Robert Rowe
- Chaplain: Fr. Michael Hennigen
- Teaching staff: 41.9 (on an FTE basis)
- Grades: 9–12
- Gender: Boys
- Enrollment: 603 (2015–2016)
- Student to teacher ratio: 14.4
- Campus size: 30 acres (12 ha)
- Colors: Blue and white
- Mascot: Colonel
- Nickname: Colonels
- Accreditation: Southern Association of Colleges and Schools
- Newspaper: The CCH Times
- Website: www.covcath.org

Covington Catholic High School (abbreviated CCH or CovCath) is a private, Roman Catholic, high school for boys in Park Hills, Kentucky, United States. It was founded in 1925 by Bishop Francis William Howard and Brother George Sauer, and is part of the Roman Catholic Diocese of Covington. The school is the only boys' high school in northern Kentucky and one of five in the Cincinnati area. The girls' Notre Dame Academy is located across the street.

== History ==
=== Early history ===
Covington Catholic traces its roots to St. Joseph Commercial School in Covington. In 1885, Bishop Camillus Paul Maes invited three brothers of the Society of Mary of Dayton, Ohio, to run the all-boys parochial school at St. Joseph's Parish on 12th Street. The brothers later established the commercial school to offer vocational education in business. The school graduated classes from 1892 to 1926.

In 1925, responding to Bishop Francis William Howard's call for a four-year Catholic boy's high school in Northern Kentucky, the Marianists opened Covington Catholic High School at Mother of God on West 6th Street, with a freshman class of 32. The commercial school closed the following year as the brothers chose to devote their efforts to the new high school. High school classes were held in the Mother of God School building until a new building could be completed. Covington Catholic graduated its first class of 17 in 1929. The school received accreditation from the Southern Association of Colleges and Schools and the Kentucky Department of Education that year. In its early years, the school's support and students came primarily from parishes in Covington, Fort Mitchell, Fort Wright, and Ludlow.

=== Relocation to Park Hills ===
In the early 1950s, it became apparent that Covington Catholic High School would have to be expanded further to accommodate increased demand. Pastors from 13 Northern Kentucky parishes approved plans for construction of a new 44,000-square-foot (4,100 m^{2}) high school building on a 14-acre (5.7 ha) plot in Park Hills, a few miles away from the previous location in Covington. The cornerstone was placed in 1954, and the first class graduated from the school in 1955. The 13 parishes shared the cost of the new school, around $845,000 (equivalent to $8.03 million in 2025).

The school gymnasium was dedicated on January 29, 1955, when the Purcell High School Cavaliers played Covington Catholic in basketball. Some Kenton County families sent their children to Newport Catholic High School because Covington Catholic lacked a football program. In 1968, the school added a football team that initially practiced at the Ludlow landfill. Wooten Field was later added for football, and the baseball field was completely rebuilt. A building containing a weight room, locker rooms, showers, and offices was added in 1988 to accommodate the growing needs of athletic teams.

Covington Catholic's athletic program benefited from a 1979 Ohio High School Athletic Association rule, affirmed in Alerding v. OHSAA, that barred Kentucky residents from participating in Ohio high school athletic competitions. Parents began sending their children to Covington Catholic instead of nationally renowned Moeller High School in Cincinnati.

=== Project Team Build ===
In 1968, Covington Catholic introduced Project Team Build in response to the financial and staffing challenges that parochial schools were experiencing. The program consisted of modular scheduling, team teaching, independent study, and grading based on self-assessments, with increased participation by parents. Religious education became self-directed with an emphasis on elective courses. An "open campus" policy permitted students to leave the campus when not attending a class.

The school was accredited by the Kentucky Department of Education as an experimental school and won recognition for educational innovation. However, the governing Board of Pastors objected to the open campus policy and religion curriculum. In April 1971, after failed negotiations with the 12-member board, 30 of 46 faculty members resigned, including the principal, Fr. Richard K. Knuge. The Society of Mary permanently withdrew from the school. Kenneth J. Gross became the first lay principal that year, and the board was reorganized to include parents and laypeople. The open campus policy remained but was limited to seniors in good standing.

=== Expansion ===
On October 29, 2002, construction of the current building began directly behind the original structure. It opened on December 7, 2003, and contains four computer labs. Since the new school has been built, renovations have been made to the football field, baseball complex, and gymnasium. Wooten Field was converted to synthetic turf with markings for American football and soccer. In October 2003, Covington Catholic became the first high school in the Cincinnati area to ban tailgate parties at on-campus sporting events.

The campus expanded again in 2010 with the acquisition of 5 acres (2.0 ha) and an adjoining church property with a 20,000-square-foot (1,900 m^{2}) building, now called the Griffin Centre. Covington Catholic began a $7.6 million capital campaign to renovate and expand the school's other facilities. As part of phase 1, the Yung Family Tennis Complex opened in early 2016 and a new academic building opened soon after. In August 2017, the school opened a renovated Wooten Field at Dennis Griffin Stadium. The $2.6 million project upgraded the field, stands, and press box and added floodlights for night games. A new building opened in 2018 to house the school's STEM program and a 200-seat auditorium for drama and music classes. A south campus building will include a new cafeteria and alumni center. Phase 2 will renovate the existing gymnasium and build a separate multipurpose gymnasium.

The campus comprises 30 acres (12 ha). The gymnasium is the only building remaining from when the school moved to Park Hills.

== Academics ==
Students applying to Covington Catholic are required to take the Scholastic Testing Service's High School Placement Test (HSPT).

In 2015, Covington Catholic partnered with Project Lead the Way to introduce a STEM program. As of 2016, a quarter of enrolled students take classes in this program.

The U.S. Department of Education recognized Covington Catholic as a National Blue Ribbon School for the 2007–08 and 2016–17 school years.

== Extracurricular activities ==
=== Athletics ===
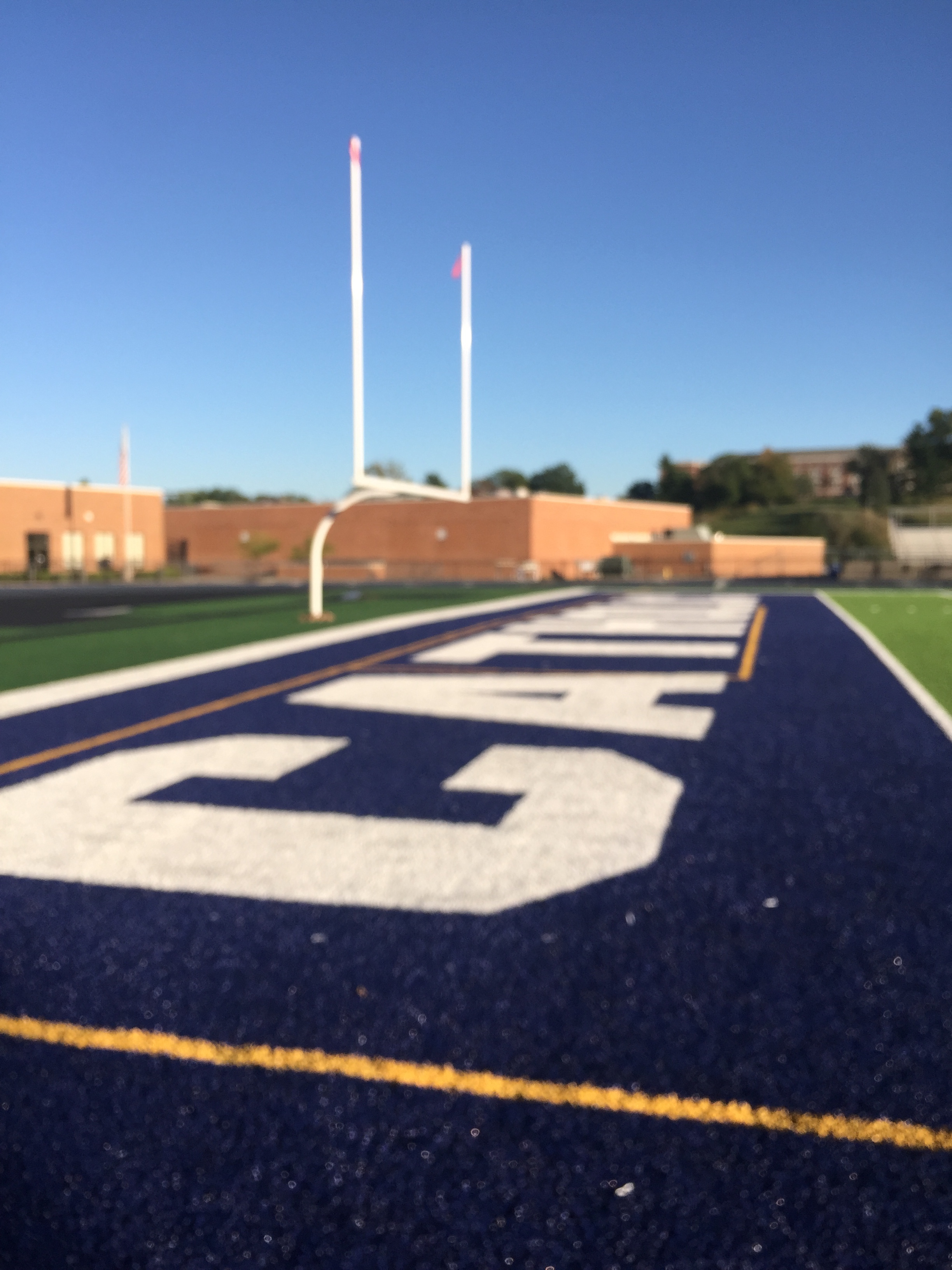
The endzone on the Covington Catholic football field.

Covington Catholic athletic teams are known as the Colonels, and the student cheering section is known as the Colonel Crazies. As of 2026, the Colonels have won 30 Kentucky High School Athletic Association championships. From 1987 to 2015, under athletic director Mike Guidugli, the Colonels won 10 state championships, 21 state runner-up titles, and 130 regional titles. As of 2014, two-thirds of the student body participates in KHSAA-sanctioned sports.

Since its football debut in 1968, the Colonels have been one of three dominant high school football teams in Northern Kentucky, along with Beechwood and Highlands. The Colonels have won eight state championships at the KHSAA Commonwealth Gridiron Bowl, the ninth most in the state. Originally, Covington Catholic was placed in Class 3A for postseason competition; it won the state championship in this class in 1987, 1988, 1993, 1994, 1997, and 2006. In a 2007 statewide realignment of boy's high school football teams, Covington Catholic was placed in Class 5A; as of 2026, they have won two state championships in this class, in 2017 & 2019. The school's District 5 competitors are Boone County, Conner, Cooper, and Highlands. The Colonels play home games on the school grounds, at Wooten Field at Dennis Griffin Stadium.

The baseball team plays home games at Tom Berger Field. The team won the state championship in 2002.

The swimming and diving teams practice at Silverlake Recreation Center in Erlanger and at Northern Kentucky University. Covington Catholic has won five state championships, in 1962 (in class B), 1974 (tied with Ft. Thomas Highlands in class AA), 1977 and 1978 (in class AA), and 1983.

Covington Catholic fielded its first soccer team in 1977. It won its first state championship in 2015.

The Colonels have also won two KHSAA championship titles in basketball (2014 and 2018), two in cross country (1982 and 1994 in class AA), two in golf (1969 and 1984), and four in track and field (2009, 2024, 2025, & 2026 in class AA).

=== Academics ===
Covington Catholic's academic team competes in the Kentucky Association for Academic Competition (KAAC) and National Academic Quiz Tournaments (NAQT). In the KAAC, from 1987 to 2026, the Academic Team has achieved 17 district titles and 5 regional runner-up titles. The Colonels have made it to multiple State competitions but have never won. In NAQT, the Colonels have won one NKY Quizbowl League Tournament, and one WDKY FOX 56 Home Team Hi-Q tournament. Covington Catholic has also qualified for 2 NAQT Kentucky State Championship tournaments, and has gone to the High School National Championship Tournament once (in 2025).

== Controversy ==
=== January 2019 Lincoln Memorial incident ===
Covington Catholic sends students to the March for Life each year; nearly half of the student body attended in 2015. On January 18, 2019, the school attracted attention when videos showed Nathan Phillips, a Native American who was participating in an Indigenous Peoples March in Washington, D.C., approaching a group of their students while beating on a drum. The students were visiting the Lincoln Memorial after participating in the Washington March for Life. The students were initially widely condemned on the basis of a short video and reported accounts from Phillips. Later, longer videos giving the incident more context fueled controversy and discussion on what had actually occurred. Several media sources issued retractions, corrections, and apologies.

The school and the Roman Catholic Diocese of Covington initially apologized to Phillips and said that they would further investigate the matter. Bishop Roger Joseph Foys subsequently apologized to the students involved, saying, "We should not have allowed ourselves to be bullied and pressured into making a statement prematurely."

Attorneys for the diocese hired Greater Cincinnati Investigation, Inc. to conduct an investigation into the event. The group found that although gestures, like the “tomahawk chop” were made, no "offensive or racial statements" were made by the Covington Catholic students. The investigation only included individuals associated with the school, such as chaperones and students. It did not include anyone on the other side of the confrontation, such as Phillips. The students involved in the incident did not face disciplinary action. Following the incident, the school made changes to better protect the students attending after numerous bomb and gun threats.

== Notable alumni ==
- Frank Busch (1969), Olympic swimming coach
- Pat Cipollone (1984), White House Counsel
- Aaron Currin (1995), Representative-elect for Kentucky State House District 65
- Brett Dietz (2000), Arena Football League player
- Nate Dusing (1997), Olympic swimmer
- Steve Flesch (1985), PGA Tour golfer
- CJ Fredrick (2018), basketball player
- Chris Harris (1991), professional wrestler
- John P. Hiltz (1998), U.S. Navy Commander (retired), Right Wing Pilot - Blue Angels U.S. Navy Flight Demonstration Team (2012–2014), CEO Pearl Harbor Aviation Museum
- Adam Koenig (1989), Kentucky Republican state representative
- Luke Maile (2009), MLB player
- Michael Mayer (2020), American tight end for the Las Vegas Raiders
- Don McNay (1977), financial author
- Mike Mitchell, NFL player (studied at the school before transferring)
- Bob Naber (1948), NBA player
- Dan Neville (1959), MLB Player
- Willie Rodriguez (2024), college football tight end for the Kentucky Wildcats
- Wilfrid Schroder (1964), Kentucky Supreme Court Justice
- Dan Tieman (1958), NBA player
- Paul Walther, NBA player
