= Nathan Phillips (activist) =

Native American activist and Omaha-people elder

- Sky Man
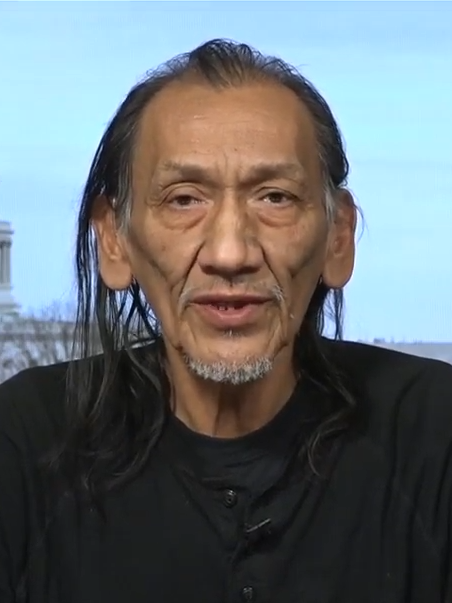
- Phillips in 2019
- Born: February 22, 1954 (age 72); Lincoln, Nebraska, U.S.
- Other name: Nathaniel R. Stanard
- Citizenship: American; Omaha
- Occupation: Activist

Nathan Phillips (born February 22, 1954), also known as Sky Man, is an Omaha Native American political activist known for his role in the 2019 Lincoln Memorial confrontation in Washington, D.C.

== Early life ==
Phillips was born in Lincoln, Nebraska, where he spent his first five years in a traditional Omaha Nation tribal home. From about the age of five, when he was separated from his mother, he was raised in a white foster family. He went to Lincoln Southeast High School. He later moved to Washington, D.C.

Phillips entered the U.S. Marine Corps Reserves on May 20, 1972. During his time in the military, he was trained as an anti-tank missileman and then served on active duty as a refrigerator technician in Nebraska and California; he was shown as absent without leave three times. He was not deployed to Vietnam or anywhere overseas. On May 5, 1976, Phillips was discharged as an E-1 private following disciplinary issues.

== Activism ==
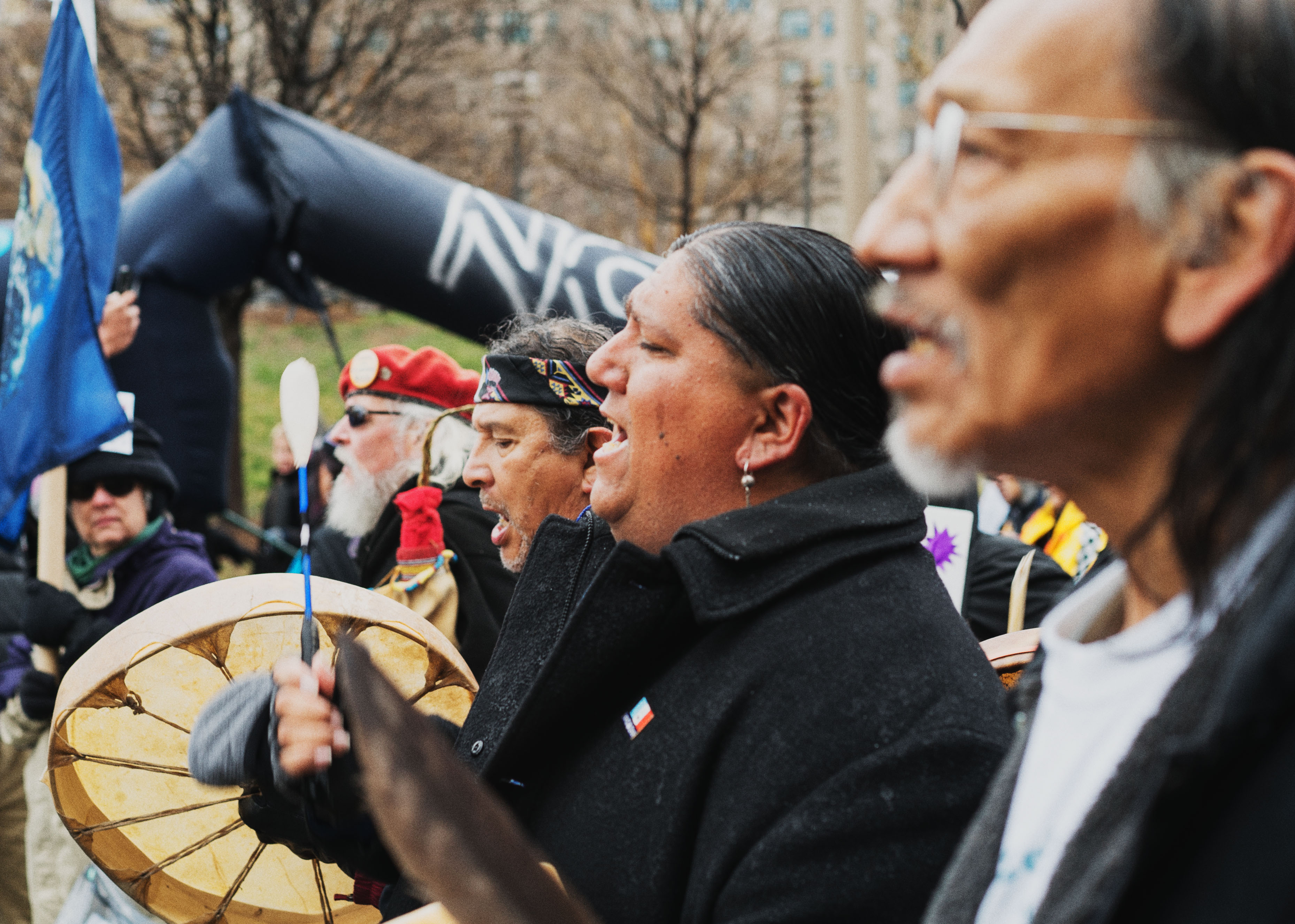
Phillips (right) at the 2017 Native Nations Rise March

By 1999, Phillips was working to create a foster care system run by American Indians for Native children to help them gain an appreciation for their heritage: "I don't want our children to think that prison is the only place for them to go."

The New York Times identified Phillips as a former director of the Native Youth Alliance, a group aiming to uphold traditional culture and spiritual ways for future Native Americans, and reported that he leads an annual ceremony honoring Native American war veterans in Arlington National Cemetery.

The Guardian called him "a well-known Native American activist who was among those leading the Standing Rock protests in 2016 and 2017 against the construction of an oil pipeline in North Dakota". Phillips was among the last of the protesters when law enforcement evicted the camps and effectively ended the protests, which he characterized as "a prayer ..., a commitment to stand for our youth, for our children, for nature and for myself, standing for my nation."

In 2015, Phillips alleged a group of students from Eastern Michigan University harassed him. (Note: According to an April 22, 2015, WJBK news report by Dave Spencer, Phillips filed a report of racial harassment with Eastern Michigan University campus police against 30 to 40 students who "referred to themselves as the Hurons, the former mascot at EMU", while dressed as Native Americans for an American Indian theme party. He was "bombarded with racial slurs", and one of the students threw a beer can at him.) A January 2019 article in The Washington Post described Phillips as "a veteran in the indigenous rights movement".

A January 2019 article in Indian Country Today described Phillips as a "keeper of a sacred pipe".

=== Between Earth and Sky ===
Phillips is the subject of the award-winning 2013 documentary film Between Earth and Sky in which he and his wife, Shoshana, travel back to his Omaha reservation after Shoshana was diagnosed with bone-marrow cancer. Together they seek traditional healing for her. She died of the disease in 2014.

=== "Make It Bun Dem" video ===
In 2012, Phillips and his son appeared in the music video for "Make It Bun Dem", a song by Skrillex and Damian "Jr. Gong" Marley. In a February 20, 2017, interview that took place during the Dakota Access Pipeline protests (DAPL), Phillips explained he had answered the casting call because he wanted to help his children cope with his wife's cancer.

== Lincoln Memorial confrontation ==
On January 18, 2019, snippets of videos recorded at the Lincoln Memorial in Washington, D.C., appeared to show Phillips being harassed by a group of 50 to 60 high school boys who had attended the coinciding annual March for Life; they were widely shared through social media. Print media described Phillips as surrounded by the students, one of whom, Nicholas Sandmann, exhibited a "relentless smirk". (Note: Print media weeks later walked back much of its reporting; see for example this Editor's Note.) Phillips had walked towards and into a group of adolescent boys from Covington Catholic High School (CovCath), who had traveled from Kentucky on a school trip to attend the anti-abortion March for Life. (Note: The March For Life had a permit for a First Amendment demonstrations on the National Mall on that day. According to The Cut, CovCath sends an annual delegation of its students to attend the anti-abortion March For Life in Washington.) He began to sing the AIM Song, a Native American intertribal song from the Red Power movement. Videos showed Sandmann, later identified as a junior at CovCath, and Phillips facing each other inches apart while Phillips chanted and beat his drum and some of the students in the background allegedly did "tomahawk chops" and danced. Several students wore red "Make America Great Again" caps.

Shortly after the video went viral, CovCath's communications director released a statement regretting that the incident took place. On January 19, 2019, multiple students who were present stated that coverage of the incident had been skewed. Sandmann released a statement saying that the students had been confronted by four members of the Black Hebrew Israelites and that Phillips had tried to provoke the students; he denied that they had chanted "build the wall" or used any racist language or gestures. Interviewed after the event, Phillips claimed he heard students chanting, "Build that wall! Build that wall!" and making racist comments. He stated, "This is indigenous land..., we're not supposed to have walls here. We never did for millenniums before anybody else came here". He also described the event as "that moment I ... put myself between beast and prey. These young men were beastly and these old black individuals was their prey."

Robby Soave, writing for Reason magazine, and Caitlin Flanagan, writing in The Atlantic, said that in their opinion, videos of the event either contradicted or failed to confirm parts of Phillips' version of events and the video evidence—while it did not completely exonerate the boys' behavior—was broadly consistent with their story. Flanagan also said that video footage showed members of the Black Hebrew Israelites shouting racial insults and slurs at a group of Native Americans and later at the students. Asked why he had approached the group of students, Phillips alleged he was trying to defuse a confrontation between the group of students and a small group of Black Hebrew Israelites who were shouting insults and profanities at the students. In subsequent interviews, Phillips and his associates stated they interpreted the chants that the students directed toward their nearby Indigenous Peoples March as racist.
