= Don McNay =

American journalist

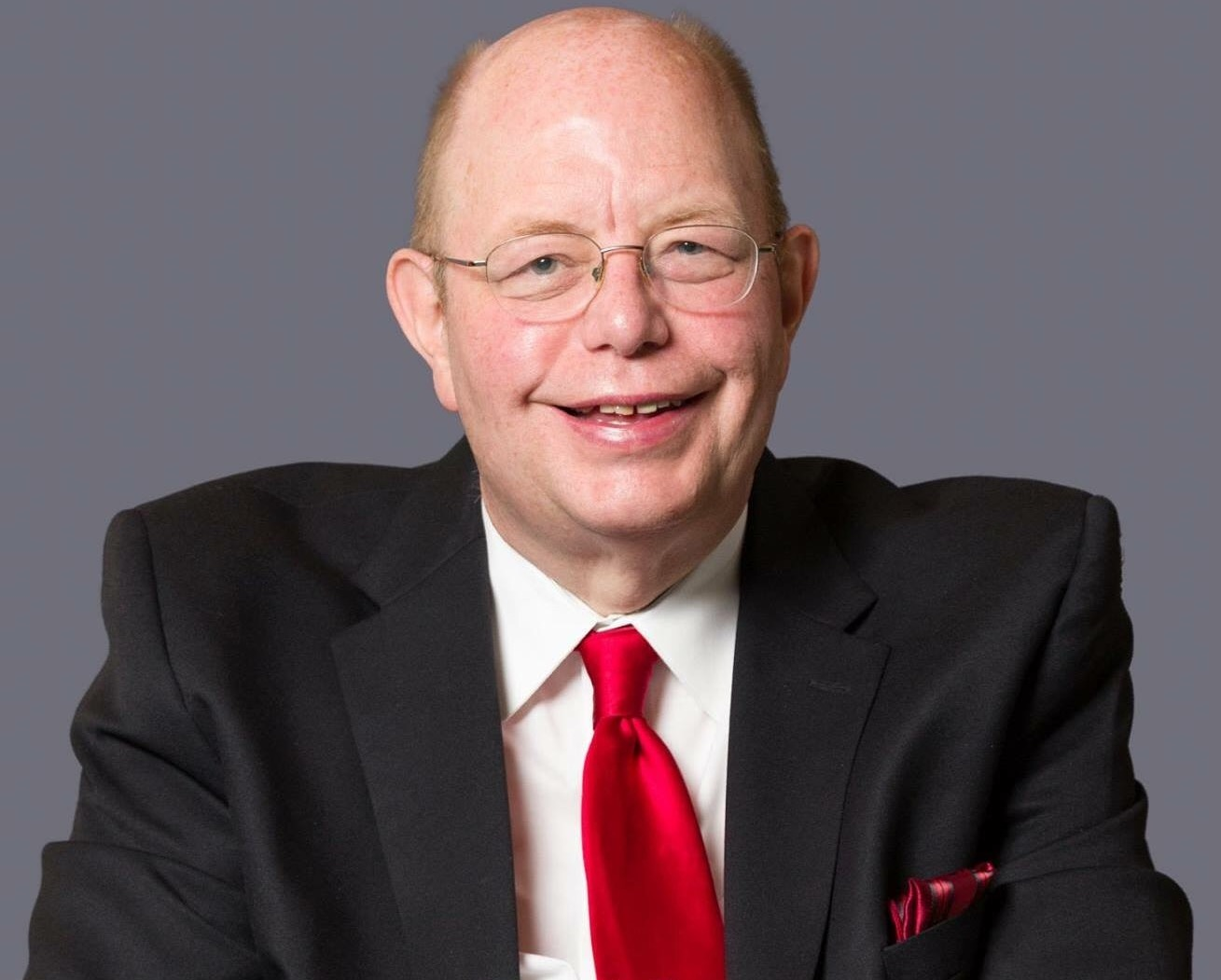
- Born: Donald Joseph McNay; February 13, 1959; Covington, Kentucky, U.S.
- Died: May 29, 2016 (aged 57); New Orleans, Louisiana, U.S.
- Education: Eastern Kentucky University; Vanderbilt University; The American College of Financial Services
- Occupation: Financial author
- Spouse: Dr. Karen Thomas McNay
- Children: 2
- Parent(s): Joseph & Ollie O. McNay

Donald Joseph McNay (February 13, 1959 – May 29, 2016) was an American chartered financial consultant and specialist and analyst of lottery, living in Lexington, Kentucky. He was also a financial author and The Huffington Post contributor.

== Background ==
McNay was born in Covington, Kentucky, on February 13, 1959, to parents Joseph O. McNay (1933–1993) and Ollie O. McNay (1939–2006). He had two siblings: Theresa Ann McNay Francis (1969–2006) and half-brother Joseph John McNay. McNay graduated from Covington Catholic High School in 1977, then graduated from Eastern Kentucky University with a Bachelor's degree in Journalism and Political Science in 1981. He was inducted into their Hall of Distinguished Alumni in 1998. He later attended Vanderbilt University for his master's degree, and earned a second from The American College of Financial Services. He went on to obtain four professional designations in the financial services field: Chartered Financial Consultant, Chartered Life Underwriter, Certified Structured Settlement Consultant, and Master of Science in Financial Services.

McNay founded McNay Settlement Group Inc. in 1982, specializing in structured settlements, qualified settlement funds, and mass torts, as well as Kentucky Guardianship Administrators. He served on the Board of Directors for the National Structured Settlement Trade Association and the Society of Settlement Planners. He has been active in Kentucky politics, including Assistant Kentucky State Coordinator for Al Gore's successful presidential primary campaign in 1988 and Campaign Treasurer for Former Secretary of State and State Auditor Bob Babbage.

McNay was married to Dr. Karen Thomas McNay, President of the Ursuline Academy in New Orleans, the oldest Catholic school and oldest all-girls school in the United States. He has two daughters, Angela Luhys and Gena Bigler (married to Clay Bigler).

McNay died on May 29, 2016, in New Orleans, Louisiana, aged 57.

== Writing ==
McNay was a published author and weekly columnist for The Huffington Post, writing frequently on financial issues and the poverty industry.

McNay has written eight books: Brand New Man: My Weight Loss Journey, Death By Lottery, Don McNay's Greatest Hits, Life Lessons from the Lottery: Protecting Your Money in a Scary World, Son of a Son of a Gambler: Joe McNay 80th Birthday Edition, Wealth Without Wall Street: A Main Street Guide to Making Money, Son of a Son of a Gambler: Winners, Losers and What to Do When You Win the Lottery and The Unbridled World of Ernie Fletcher: Reflections on Kentucky's Governor. Another book, Life Lessons from the Golf Course, was co-written with PGA professional Clay Hamrick. He was also the CEO of RRP International, a book publishing and digital media company based in Lexington, Kentucky.

McNay won "Best Columnist" from the Kentucky Press Association in 2005. He was a syndicated newspaper columnist for CNHI news service from 2006 to 2013 and a community columnist for the Lexington Herald-Leader from 1983 to 1986. He has served as treasurer of the National Society of Newspaper Columnists.

He has also written research articles for various legal and financial publications, including Trial, National Underwriter, Bench & Bar, and Best's Review.

== Lottery ==
McNay was frequently called on to give advice for lottery winners, specializing in helping people who have come into sudden money. He has appeared on various television and radio programs, including CBS Morning News, CBS Evening News with Katie Couric, ABC News Radio, BBC News, KPCC- Los Angeles, WLW-AM-Cincinnati, Al Jazeera-English, CBC Television, TBS eFM, RAI, CTV and Radio Live (New Zealand).

His insights have been sought by print publications, including The New York Times, Los Angeles Times, New York Daily News, Time, National Enquirer, Daily Mail, Reuters, Associated Press, Reader's Digest, USA Today, Chicago Tribune and Forbes.

== Bibliography ==
- Brand New Man: My Weight Loss Journey
- Death By Lottery: They Hit the Jackpot. They Lost Their Lives.
- Don McNay's Greatest Hits: Ten Years as an Award-Winning Columnist
- Son of a Son of a Gambler: Joe McNay 80th Birthday Edition
- Life Lessons from the Golf Course (cowritten with Clay Hamrick)
- Life Lessons from the Lottery: Protecting Your Money in a Scary World
- Wealth Without Wall Street: A Main Street Guide to Making Money
- Son of a Son of a Gambler: Winners, Losers and What to Do When You Win the Lottery
- The Unbridled World of Ernie Fletcher: Reflections on Kentucky's Governor
