= Bob Naber =

American basketball player

Personal information
- Born: September 3, 1929 Covington, Kentucky, U.S.
- Died: February 8, 1998 (aged 68)
- Listed height: 6 ft 3 in (1.91 m)
- Listed weight: 185 lb (84 kg)

Career information
- High school: Covington Catholic (Covington, Kentucky)
- College: Louisville (1949–1952)
- NBA draft: 1952: undrafted
- Position: Forward
- Number: 14

Career history
- 1952: Indianapolis Olympians
- Stats at NBA.com
- Stats at Basketball Reference

Robert E. Naber (September 3, 1929 – February 8, 1998) was an American professional basketball player who spent one season in the National Basketball Association (NBA) as a member of the Indianapolis Olympians during the 1952–53 season.

Naber graduated from Covington Catholic High School in 1948. He attended the University of Louisville. He later taught and coached varsity basketball at Covington Catholic.

He was a member of the Northern Kentucky High School Athletic Directors Hall of Fame, the Northern Kentucky Hall of Fame, and the Northern Kentucky Sports Hall of Fame.

== Career statistics ==
Legend
GP	Games played	GS	Games started	MPG	Minutes per game
FG%	Field goal percentage	3P%	3-point field goal percentage	FT%	Free throw percentage
RPG	Rebounds per game	APG	Assists per game	SPG	Steals per game
BPG	Blocks per game	PPG	Points per game	**Bold**	Career high

=== NBA ===
==== Regular season ====
Year	Team	GP	MPG	FG%	FT%	RPG	APG	PPG
1952–53	Indianapolis	4	2.8	.000	.500	1.3	.3	.3
