= Israelite Church of God in Jesus Christ =

American organization of Hebrew Israelites

The Israelite Church of God in Jesus Christ (ICGJC), formerly known as the Israeli Church of Universal Practical Knowledge, is an American organization of Black Hebrew Israelites. It is part of the One West Camp form of Black Hebrew Israelism. Its headquarters are in New York City and in 2008 had churches in cities in 10 U.S. states. They are not to be confused with Israel of God (IOG) or Israel The Church of Christ (ICOJ), which are separate denominations of Black Hebrew churches that believe in multicultural, multiethnic Messianic Judaism.

Tazadaqyah led the church (as "Chief High Priest") until his death in April 2020. The ICGJC has been described as openly antisemitic, racist, sexist, and homophobic.

== History ==
The group formerly had its headquarters at One West 125th Street in Harlem, then known as the Israeli School of Universal Practical Knowledge, and its wider movement is known as the One West Camp, including offshoots such as the modern Israelite School of Universal Practical Knowledge.

== Beliefs ==
The ICGJC teaches that the descendants of the Twelve Lost Tribes and biblical Jews are Black Americans, West Indians, and Indigenous peoples of the Americas, not the Jewish people. The group alleges the Bible reveals that the Israelites are Blacks, Hispanics, and Native Americans, that they have divine favor and inspiration, and that they are superior to other races, often using Deuteronomy 7:6 to support their claim. They also hold strong apocalyptic views. The ICGJC believes that Jesus was God's divine Son and Messiah and the redeemer for the sins of the Israelites. The Old Testament (Hebrew Bible) and New Testament and Apocrypha are considered inspired, but the group does not believe in the traditional doctrine of the Trinity.

== Organization ==
=== Ranking system ===
Positions in the ICGJC which may only be filled by a high priest at the higher orders include Bishop, Chief Priest, Apostle, and/or Holy Apostle. These leaders are primarily responsible for the spiritual welfare of the members and the administration of local church units. However, they have also subservient positions that are filled by other men when they are "elevated by the spirit". Other positions are given the names ‘general’, ‘captain’ and ‘officer’.

Perhaps the most prominent leader of the organization was Tazadaqyah (Jermaine Grant), who rose in to power of the church in the late 1990s. Tazadaqyah was proclaimed by many of his followers to be the God-sent "Comforter" of the Nation of Israel.

The ICGJC and its various splinter groups can be loosely grouped together as sects, which advocate a Hebrew and Authorized King James Version-only approach to the Bible (i.e. they endorse only the Hebrew/Greek and AKJV versions of the Bible), and the idea that Caucasians are Edomites.

== Controversies ==
=== Lawsuit over doll prototype ===
In 2013, the ICGJC ordered action figures cast in the image of their leader (Chief High Priest Tazadaqyah) from a toymaker. When they received the dolls they sued the toymaker (Vicale Corp) because of the dolls' complexion. The organization complained that the dolls did not look like Tazadaqyah and were not black enough, that the Connecticut toymaker put "pointed noses and faces" dolls; they also complained that half of them "were light brown" instead of "dark brown," according to the court papers.

=== Perceived enemies ===
According to the Southern Poverty Law Center (SPLC), the group sees white people as enemies, as they “are descended from a race of red, hairy beings, known as Edomites, who were spawned by Esau, the twin brother of Jacob" (later known as Israel) in the Old Testament. Other enemies include "fraudulent" Jews (i.e., the people known to the world today as Jews), "the synagogue of Satan," Asians, promiscuous black women, abortionists, continental Africans (who, according to the ICGJC and other extremist Israelites, "sold the lost tribes of Israel, who were black, to European slave traders"), and sodomites, who "according to extremist Israelites should all be put to death".

=== Allegations of black supremacy and racism ===
In late 2008, the SPLC described the ICGJC and other black supremacist Hebrew Israelite groups as "the extremist fringe" of the movement. It wrote that the members of such groups "believe that Jews are devilish impostors and ... openly condemn whites as evil personified, deserving only death or slavery". The SPLC also said that "most Hebrew Israelites are neither explicitly racist nor anti-Semitic and do not advocate violence". In 2017, they listed the group as a black nationalist hate group.

The Black Hebrew groups characterized as black supremacist by the SPLC include the Nation of Yahweh and the ICGJC. Also, the Anti-Defamation League has written that the "12 Tribes of Israel" website, maintained by a Black Hebrew group, promotes hatred and black supremacy.

=== Fraud and tax evasion charges and death of Tazadaqyah ===
In April 2018, the organization’s leader Jermaine Grant, known as Tazadaqyah, and the treasurer, Lincoln Warrington, were arrested on fraud and tax charges. The United States Attorney for the District of New Jersey alleged the men "used their positions to divert millions of dollars for Grant’s personal use and benefit." Grant and Warrington pleaded guilty to evading tax after using an entertainment company to divert funds from members, spending $5.3 million on a lavish lifestyle without declaring the money to the government.

In January 2020, Grant was sentenced to 18 months in federal prison while Warrington was sentenced to 12 months and a day. They were also to be under three years of supervised release. The federal prison system has no offer of parole. Before he was to report to prison, Grant died on April 1, 2020, from complications of COVID-19. Some former members described Grant as a cult leader who had gained complete influence of his follower’s lives through manipulation and belittlement.

== See also ==
- African-American – Jewish relations#Black Hebrew Israelites
- Afro-American religion
- Alliance of Black Jews
- Groups claiming an affiliation with the ancient Israelites
