= Indigenous Peoples March =

Political demonstration on the National Mall in Washington (January 18, 2019)

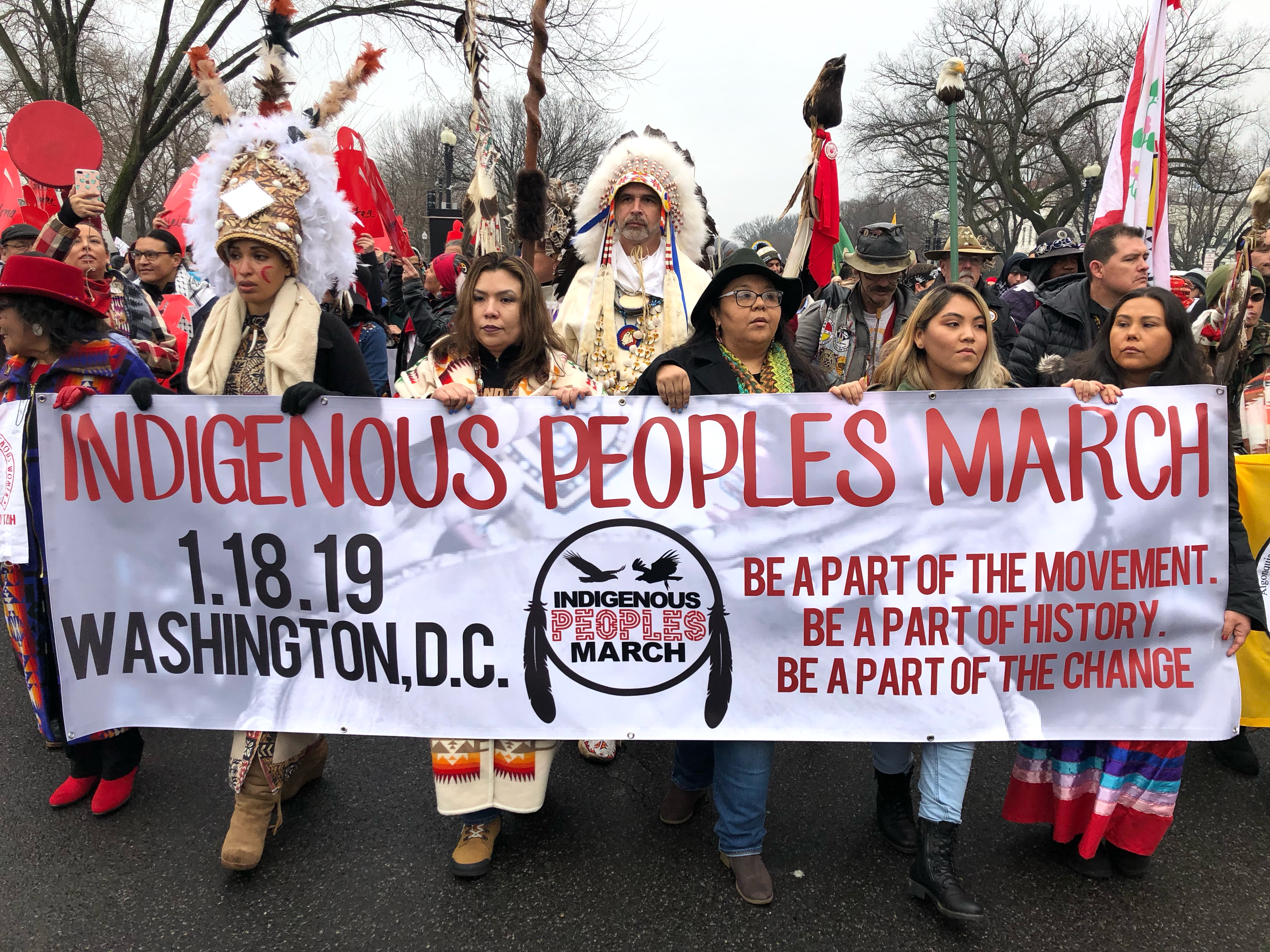
Front of march procession

The Indigenous Peoples March was a demonstration and march on the National Mall in Washington, D.C., on January 18, 2019. The event included speeches, prayers, songs, and dance. Its goal was to draw attention to global injustices against indigenous peoples. After prayers outside the Building of Interior Affairs, the marchers proceeded along Constitution Avenue to Henry Bacon Park, north of the Lincoln Memorial. During the day-long event, featured guests, such as Ruth Buffalo, Deb Haaland and Sharice Davids, spoke to crowds gathered on the stairs in front of the Lincoln Memorial and the plaza on the edge of the Lincoln Memorial Reflecting Pool. Organizers expected a crowd of about 10,000 people. Simultaneous "solidarity marches" were scheduled in a dozen other locations, such as Gallup, New Mexico, and Bemidji, Minnesota, in the United States and Saskatoon, Saskatchewan, in Canada.

In late afternoon, when the last group of the March participants were still on the Plaza beside the Reflecting Pool, an incident occurred involving a small group of March participants including Omaha tribe member Nathan Phillips, five Black Hebrew Israelites men, and dozens of Covington Catholic High School teenage students on a school trip arriving at their meeting place after attending the pro-life March for Life rally. In the wake of the widespread sharing of more detailed video clips, media analyses of the videos, and statements, public opinion became polarized, with some claiming the students were completely absolved of all wrongdoing and others saying they were disrespectful of a Native American elder on a day that should have been a celebration of the first Indigenous Peoples' March.

== Context ==
The goal of the march was to build on the momentum of the 2016–2017 Dakota Access Pipeline (DAPL) protests, which had drawn attention to concerns of indigenous peoples globally. (Note: The protests against the Dakota Access Pipeline construction, which had been rerouted through the Standing Rock Sioux Reservation under Lake Oahe and the Missouri River, began in the spring of 2016 and ended in 2017, but supplemental complaints were still being filed in court in October 2018 the most recent in a list of dozens of litigation documents. One of President Trump's first Presidential Memoranda was signed on January 24, 2017, and authorized the construction of the Dakota Access Pipeline. Presidential Memorandum Regarding Construction of the Dakota Access, which according to a January 24, 2017 BBC article, "infuriated environmentalists.") The organizers of the "grassroots effort" included indigenous leaders, tribes, and celebrities, many of whom were part of the Indigenous Peoples Movement.

The Indigenous Peoples March which took place the day before the third annual Women's March, was a grassroots effort intended to "unite indigenous groups globally, not just in the United States, according to The Herald Sun.

== Event organizers ==
The main organizers of the event were Cliff Matias and Nathalie Farfan.

Farfan is an Ecuadorian Indigenous woman who co-hosts the Latina feminist podcast Morado Lens and New Jersey–based La Brujas Club spiritual wellness community.

Matias is a director of the Redhawk Native American Arts Council in Brooklyn, New York He had previously organized the Standing Rock Protests and New York City area pow-pows and Indigenous Peoples' Day events, and claims heritage in both the Taíno (Puerto Rican) and Quechua (Peruvian) indigenous traditions.

== Program ==
The march began at the Interior Department, proceeded to the Lincoln Memorial, for an all-day rally, where Indigenous leaders addressed the crowd at the memorial. The evening program consisted of a fundraising concert at the Songbyrd Music House.

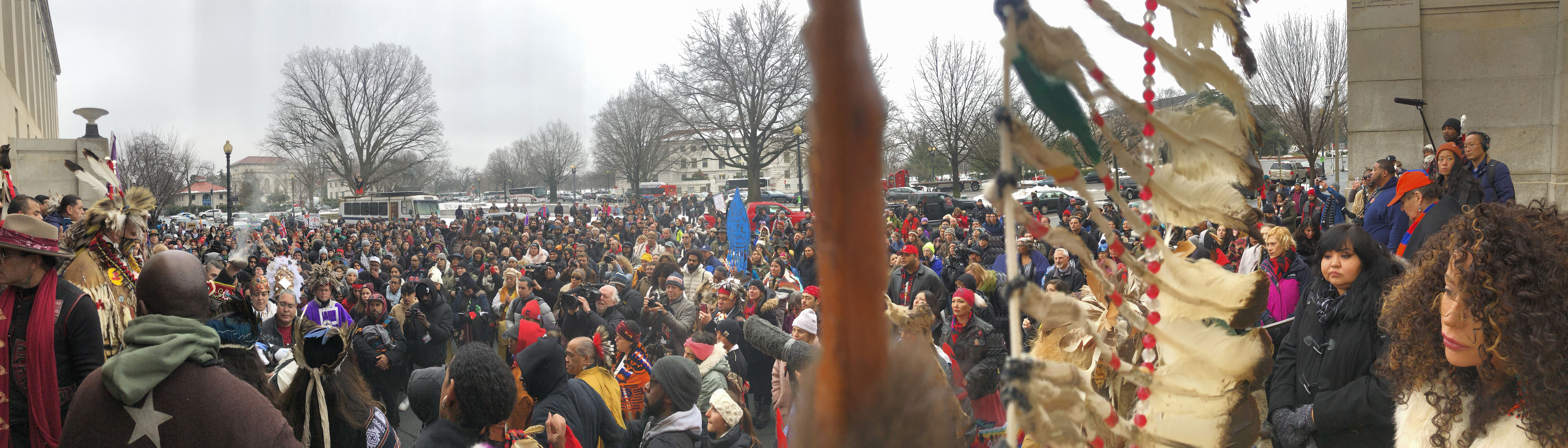
Prior to the march procession starting, prayers were held on the steps of the U.S. Department of the Interior.

The event began at 8:00 a.m. outside the Building of Interior Affairs, which runs the Bureau of Indian Affairs, with opening songs, prayers, and smudging with sage, a ceremony for cleansing "our eyes to see clearly, our mouths to speak the truth, and our hearts to spread love." The marchers, who chanted, sang, and drummed, then walked towards the Lincoln Memorial from Constitution Avenue to 17th St. NW and through the National Mall. Featured guests who spoke beside the Lincoln Memorial Reflecting Pool included Ruth Buffalo, a North Dakota Representative and member of the Mandan, Hidatsa, and Arikara Nation, and Paulette Jordan, who had served on the Tribal Council, sovereign government of the Coeur d'Alene people, and as a member of the Idaho House of Representatives from 2014 until 2018 when she ran for governor of Idaho. Deb Haaland and Sharice Davids, the first Native American women elected to Congress, spoke at the March. Haaland was a representative for New Mexico and a member of the Laguna Pueblo tribe; Davids was a Representative for Kansas, and a member of the Ho-Chunk Nation.

Indigenous elders continued to speak, sing, and drum even as a concurrent March for Life rally "began to overlap the Indigenous Peoples Movement among the stairs of the Lincoln Memorial." The day ended with a round dance on the steps of the Lincoln Memorial, with chants of "We are still here."

=== Issues ===
The goal of the March was to raise public awareness of issues that affect indigenous people worldwide, such as missing and murdered Indigenous women (MMIW), climate change, diabetes and obesity in the Pacific and Indigenous communities, the 2018–19 United States federal government shutdown, "voter suppression in Indian Country", families divided by walls and borders, human trafficking including sex trafficking, police brutality against Native Americans, "mistreatment of Indigenous peoples at the borders", and the need to protect indigenous lands. Marchers carried signs that said, "Water is Life" (a theme of the Indigenous movement), "There is no O'Odham word for wall", and "We will not be silenced." They also "came to bring awareness of the ill-effects of oil pipelines running through Indian Country."

=== Participants ===
Lakeland PBS news item on the solidarity march in Bemidji, Minnesota

Organizers expected about 10,000 people would attend. Native News Online said that "thousands of American Indians, Alaska Natives, American Samoa, Australia and other indigenous peoples from various parts of the world" attended the march.

A delegation representing eight tribes from Oklahoma included Reverend David Wilson, a member of the Choctaw Nation and the Oklahoma Indian Missionary Conference superintendent. Wilson said that half of his group were young American Indian Methodists in the group ranging in age from 20 to 32 "who are more inclined to work on issues of social justice, more so than other generations.... Social justice is in their DNA". Women carrying a banner calling attention to missing Indigenous women wore red, and one woman carried a red dress, a symbol of the missing Indigenous women.

Filmmaker and visual anthropologist Queen Melé Le'iato Tuiasosopo Muhammad Ali, whose mother is American Samoan and father is African American, shared the health issues faced by American Samoa and Pacific Islanders during her speech.

=== Funding ===
Organizers raised funds through crowdfunding via Facebook, emails, GoFundMe, and other sites.

== Late afternoon incident ==
In the late afternoon on January 19, 2019, when two rallies (Indigenous Peoples March and March for Life) taking place that day at the National Mall had ended, an incident occurred at the Lincoln Memorial involving five Black Hebrew Israelites men, Covington Catholic High School teenage students on an annual school trip to attend a pro-life March for Life rally, and Native American marchers. The first short videos of the encounter that were uploaded to Instagram, Twitter, and YouTube received millions of views. A photo of one of the students wearing a MAGA hat standing face-to-face with Nathan Phillips as he beat on a ceremonial drum was published in numerous mass media outlets. The first social media video clips were short and focused on this moment, leading to harsh criticism of the high school students, who some described as mocking and harassing the elder. Some people affiliated with the March described the boys as appearing threatening due to their numbers, actions, and the "Make America Great Again" caps and clothing that some wore. By the next day, January 20, longer videos had been uploaded, revealing how the encounter had unfolded. Phillips clarified that it was he who had approached the crowd of students, in what he said was an attempt to defuse what Phillips perceived to be a brewing conflict between the students and the group of five men, later identified as Black Hebrew Israelites, who had been taunting the students.

Over the next several days, statements from a spokesperson for the March, from an attorney for the Lakota People's Law Project, from Nicholas Sandmann, the student seen in the video standing face to face with Phillips, which was prepared with the help of a publications relations firm hired by his family, and statements from other officials, each offered different perspectives on the incident. In the wake of the widespread sharing of more detailed video clips, media analyses of the videos, and statements, public opinion became polarized, with some saying the students were completely absolved of all wrongdoing and others saying the students were disrespectful of a Native American elder on a day that should have been a celebration of the first Indigenous Peoples March.

On the evening of January 19, Phillips led approximately 50 individuals who attempted to gain entrance to the Basilica of the National Shrine of the Immaculate Conception while chanting and hitting drums while the Catholics inside celebrated Mass.

== Media coverage ==
The Washington Post described the Indigenous Peoples March as "meaningful", and an example of how Native Americans will not be silenced. The article drew attention to Donald Trump's joking about the Wounded Knee Massacre to mock the senior United States senator from Massachusetts, Elizabeth Warren. (Note: Warren has often been criticized for her claim of Native American ancestry. See Beinart's article in The Atlantic.) The Post also wrote in a separate article that the "tense encounter in Washington prompted outrage".
