= Notre Dame Academy (Park Hills, Kentucky) =

Location
- 1699 Hilton Drive; Park Hills, (Kenton County), Kentucky 41011; United States; 39°3′43″N 84°31′54″W

Information
- Type: Private, All-Girls
- Religious affiliation: Catholic
- Established: 1906; 120 years ago
- President: Lauren Hitron
- Principal: Lisa Timmerding
- Grades: 9–12
- Enrollment: Approximately 575 (2019)
- Student to teacher ratio: 15:1
- Colors: Blue and Gold
- Mascot: Panda
- Accreditation: Southern Association of Colleges and Schools
- Athletic Director: Janet Carl
- Website: www.ndapandas.org

Notre Dame Academy is a Catholic, all-girls, college-preparatory high school within the Diocese of Covington, sponsored by the Sisters of Notre Dame of Covington, Kentucky. Notre Dame Academy is the only all-girls single-gender high school for girls in Northern Kentucky. Notre Dame Academy is located in Park Hills, Kentucky, United States.

== History ==
Notre Dame Academy was first established in 1874 as a Catholic grade school with an initial class of seven students. The school offered kindergarten through eighth grade plus a two-year commercial school. A school building on Fifth Street was dedicated on July 26, 1876. The school expanded to include a high school program in 1906. In 1937, the elementary school program was discontinued due to growing enrollment in the high school.

By the 1950s, the school had outgrown its downtown Covington location and Notre Dame Academy moved to nearby Park Hills. The new campus, on the grounds of the Sisters of Notre Dame provincial house, cost nearly $1.5 million to build (equivalent to $11.7 million in 2024). It opened in October 1963.

In 1996, Notre Dame Academy completed a $2.9 million project (equivalent to $5.34 million) to renovate and expand the school building, adding a gymnasium. The school began another renovation and expansion project in 2007, which added athletic fields and a theater.

In 2019, Notre Dame Academy completed a $7 million capital campaign to renovate its 20th-century building.

== Academics ==
The U.S. Department of Education recognized Notre Dame Academy as a National Blue Ribbon School of Excellence in 1996, 2012 and 2019.

== Athletics ==
Notre Dame is a member of the Kentucky High School Athletic Association (KHSAA) and has won 29 state championships and has 32 state runner-up titles. The majority of the school's students participate in one or more of 14 sports: archery, basketball, bass fishing, bowling, cheer, cross-country, golf, lacrosse (club), soccer, softball, swimming, tennis, track, and volleyball.

== Notable people ==
=== Notable alumnae ===
- Laura Cottingham — art critic, curator, and visual artist
- Morgan Hentz — professional volleyball player, U.S. national team
- Amy McGrath — former fighter pilot, 2018 U.S. congressional candidate, and 2020 U.S. Senate candidate
- Roxanne Qualls — mayor of Cincinnati
- Marie Rose Messingschlager — ministry among Native American peoples
