= Park Hills, Kentucky =

- City
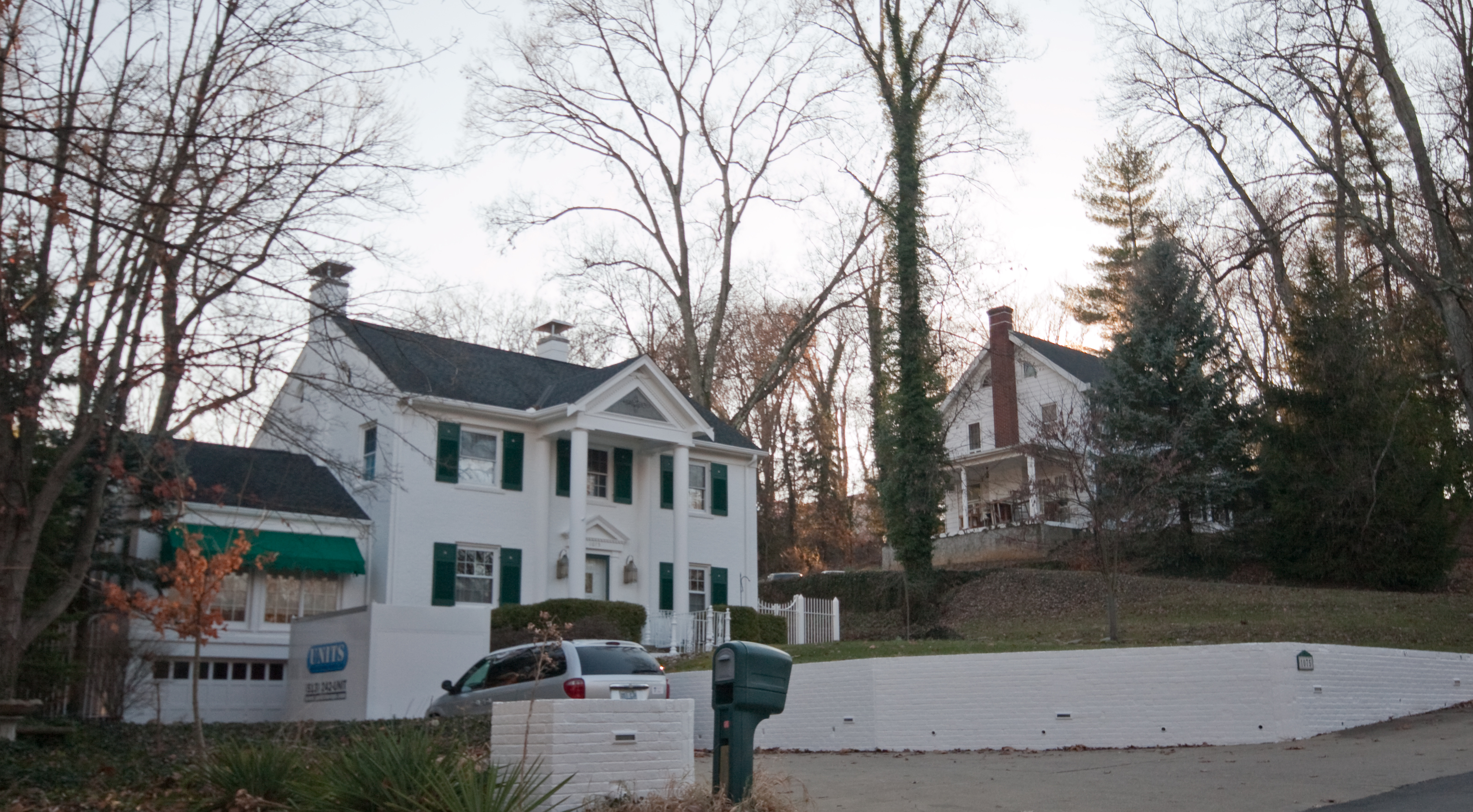
- Houses in the Park Hills Historic District

- Location within Kenton County and Kentucky
- Coordinates: 39°04′09″N 84°31′52″W
- Country: United States
- State: Kentucky
- County: Kenton
- Incorporated: 1927
- Named for: nearby Devou Park

Government
  - Type: Mayor-council government
  - Mayor: Kathy Zembrodt

Area
  - Total: 0.78 sq mi (2.02 km^{2})
  - Land: 0.78 sq mi (2.01 km^{2})
  - Water: 0 sq mi (0.00 km^{2})
- Elevation: 804 ft (245 m)

Population (2020)
  - Total: 3,162
  - Estimate (2024): 3,191
  - Density: 4,069.3/sq mi (1,571.17/km^{2})
- Time zone: UTC-5 (Eastern (EST))
  - Summer (DST): UTC-4 (EDT)
- ZIP code: 41011
- Area code: 859
- FIPS code: 21-59255
- GNIS feature ID: 2404476
- Website: parkhillsky.gov

Park Hills is a home rule-class city in Kenton County, Kentucky, United States. The population was 3,162 at the 2020 census. It is a suburb of the Cincinnati metropolitan area. Much of the city was listed on the National Register of Historic Places in 2008 as the Park Hills Historic District.

== History ==
The area of present-day Park Hills was subdivided and settled c. 1845 on land owned by Messrs. Coran, Corry, and Spencer. This community remained quite small until D. Collins Lee and Robert Simmons developed the area in 1926 and incorporated the present city the next year.

== Geography ==
Park Hills is located 2.5 miles (4.0 km) from downtown Cincinnati, Ohio, and approximately 10 miles (16 km) from the Cincinnati/Northern Kentucky International Airport (CVG). According to the United States Census Bureau, the city has a total area of 0.8 square miles (2.1 km^{2}), all land. The city is part of the Bluegrass Region of the Commonwealth of Kentucky, part of the Upland South region of the United States.

== Demographics ==
Historical population
Census	Pop.	Note	%±
1930	1,275		—
1940	1,615		26.7%
1950	2,577		59.6%
1960	4,076		58.2%
1970	3,999		−1.9%
1980	3,500		−12.5%
1990	3,321		−5.1%
2000	2,977		−10.4%
2010	2,970		−0.2%
2020	3,162		6.5%
2024 (est.)	3,191		0.9%
U.S. Decennial Census

=== 2020 census ===
As of the 2020 census, Park Hills had a population of 3,162. The median age was 37.2 years. 21.7% of residents were under the age of 18 and 18.2% of residents were 65 years of age or older. For every 100 females there were 88.9 males, and for every 100 females age 18 and over there were 85.7 males age 18 and over.

100.0% of residents lived in urban areas, while 0.0% lived in rural areas.

There were 1,387 households in Park Hills, of which 28.9% had children under the age of 18 living in them. Of all households, 40.8% were married-couple households, 20.8% were households with a male householder and no spouse or partner present, and 29.2% were households with a female householder and no spouse or partner present. About 34.0% of all households were made up of individuals and 11.4% had someone living alone who was 65 years of age or older.

There were 1,493 housing units, of which 7.1% were vacant. The homeowner vacancy rate was 1.1% and the rental vacancy rate was 7.5%.

Racial composition as of the 2020 census
Race	Number	Percent
White	2,683	84.9%
Black or African American	137	4.3%
American Indian and Alaska Native	6	0.2%
Asian	38	1.2%
Native Hawaiian and Other Pacific Islander	1	0.0%
Some other race	124	3.9%
Two or more races	173	5.5%
Hispanic or Latino (of any race)	220	7.0%

=== 2000 census ===
As of the census of 2000, there were 2,977 people, 1,382 households, and 725 families residing in the city. The population density was 3,840.2 inhabitants per square mile (1,482.7/km^{2}). There were 1,523 housing units at an average density of 1,964.6 per square mile (758.5/km^{2}). The racial makeup of the city was 96.64% White, 1.65% African American, 0.07% Native American, 0.77% Asian, 0.30% from other races, and 0.57% from two or more races. Hispanic or Latino of any race were 0.60% of the population.

There were 1,382 households, out of which 24.7% had children under the age of 18 living with them, 40.4% were married couples living together, 9.0% had a female householder with no husband present, and 47.5% were non-families. 40.3% of all households were made up of individuals, and 9.7% had someone living alone who was 65 years of age or older. The average household size was 2.08 and the average family size was 2.85.

In the city, the population was spread out, with 19.9% under the age of 18, 9.1% from 18 to 24, 33.2% from 25 to 44, 23.3% from 45 to 64, and 14.5% who were 65 years of age or older. The median age was 37 years. For every 100 females, there were 92.1 males. For every 100 females age 18 and over, there were 87.1 males.

The median income for a household in the city was $42,227, and the median income for a family was $65,833. Males had a median income of $39,450 versus $31,719 for females. The per capita income for the city was $29,486. About 2.8% of families and 5.3% of the population were below the poverty line, including 4.9% of those under age 18 and 4.7% of those age 65 or over.

== Government ==
Park Hills is a home rule-class city. The city has a mayor who is elected every four years: the current mayor is Kathy Zembrodt. The city has a six-member City Council that is elected every two years. Current City Council Members are:

- Joe Shields
- Steve Elkins
- Kevin Theissen
- Sara Froelich
- Pam Spoor
- Wesley Deters

Park Hills is represented in the Kentucky General Assembly by Senator Christian McDaniel (R) of the 23rd District in the Senate and by Representative Stephanie Dietz (R) of the 65th District in the House of Representatives.

Park Hills is located in Kentucky's 4th Congressional District, currently represented in the 113th United States Congress by Thomas Massie (R).

== Education ==
=== Public schools ===
The city is served by the Kenton County School District. Students from Park Hills attend Dixie Heights High School in grades 9 through 12, Turkey Foot Middle School in grades 6 through 8, and Fort Wright Elementary in grades Pre-K through 5.

=== Private schools ===
There are two private Catholic schools within the community, Covington Catholic High School and Notre Dame Academy. Covington Catholic is all male and Notre Dame is all female, both schools are run by the Diocese of Covington and their Department of Catholic Schools. The Diocese runs 17 schools in Kenton County.
