= List of Binghamton University alumni =

Following is a list of notable alumni from Binghamton University. The university was known as Triple Cities College of Syracuse University from 1946 to 1950 and Harpur College from 1950 to 1955.

== Academics ==
Name	Class	Major	Notability	References
Susan Ariel Aaronson		History	Research professor at the Elliott School of International Affairs at George Washington University	
David P. Barash	1966	Biology	Evolutionary biologist and professor of psychology at the University of Washington	
Juda Bennett	1988	English and creative writing	Author, literary theorist and professor of English at The College of New Jersey	
Marsha Berger	1974	Mathematics	Professor (emeritus) of computer science and mathematics in the Courant Institute of Mathematical Sciences of New York University	
Virginia Blanton	1989, 1991, 1998	BA English and Foreign Languages, MA English, Ph.D. English	Professor of English Language and Literature at the University of Missouri–Kansas City	
Paul Bové	1989		Professor of English at the University of Pittsburgh	
Simon J. Bronner	1974	BA	Folklorist, ethnologist, historian, sociologist, educator, and college dean	
Roderick D. Bush	1992	Ph.D	Sociologist, social activist, author, and academic specializing in the civil rights movement	
Joseph Buttigieg	1976	Ph.D. English	Professor of English at the University of Notre Dame	
William L. Chameides	1970	Atmospheric science	Atmospheric scientist and dean of Duke University's Nicholas School of the Environment	
Joseph L. Chillo		BA	President of Thomas More University and Newbury College	
Lorrie Clemo	1998	MA and PhD political science, public administration, and policy analysis	President of D'Youville College	
Rosanne D'Arrigo	1980	BA, MA	Professor at Lamont–Doherty Earth Observatory at Columbia University	
Cathy Davidson		M.A. and Ph.D.	Professor at the Graduate Center of the City University of New York and professor of English at Duke University	
Ronald E. Day	1987, 1990	MA Philosophy, Ph.D. Comparative Literature	Librarian and professor of Information and Library Science at Indiana University in Bloomington	
Donald J. DePaolo	1973	Geology	Professor of geochemistry at the University of California, Berkeley	
Georgi Derluguian	1995	Ph.D. Sociology	Professor of Social Research and Public Policy at New York University Abu Dhabi	
Grey J. Dimenna		BA	President of Monmouth University	
Marcia-Anne Dobres	1988	MA Anthropology	Archaeologist and professor at the University of Southern Maine	
Mary L. Droser	1980	MS	Paleontologist and professor of paleobiology at University of California, Riverside	
Ronald G. Ehrenberg	1966	Mathematics	Labor economist and Professor of Industrial and Labor Relations and Economics at Cornell University	
Fred Feldman	1965	MA	Professor emeritus of philosophy at the University of Massachusetts Amherst	
Sari Feldman		English	Librarian, adjunct faculty member, executive director of Cuyahoga County Public Library and president of the American Library Association	
Norman Finkelstein	1974		Political scientist and professor	
Ronald Fintushel	1975	PhD Mathematics	Mathematician and professor at Tulane University and Michigan State University	
Valery E. Forbes		Biology and Geology	Ecologist and professor specializing in environmental toxicology	
Howard Friedman	1993	Applied Physics	Statistician, data scientist, health economist, and writer who teaches at Columbia University	
Stewart D. Friedman	1974		Professor at the Wharton School of Business at the University of Pennsylvania	
Kyra Gaunt		MA Voice	Ethnomusicologist and professor at the University at Albany in New York State	
Adam Gazzaley	1990	Biochemistry	Professor of neurology, physiology, and psychiatry at the University of California, San Francisco	
William Martin Gelbart		Non-degreed	Geneticist and a professor of molecular and cellular biology at Harvard University	
Jonathan Gibralter	1978	Psychology	President of Wells College, Frostburg State University, and Farmingdale State College	
Jonathan Gottschall		Ph.D. English	Literary scholar, author, and distinguished fellow in the English department of Washington & Jefferson College	
Jean-Germain Gros	1985	Economics and sociology	Professor in political science at the University of Missouri-St. Louis	
Carol Harter		B.A., M.A., and Ph.D	President of the University of Nevada, Las Vegas	
Monique Holsey-Hyman	1986		Faculty at North Carolina Central University, social worker, and politician	
Donald C. Hood	1965		Professor of Psychology and Ophthalmic Science at Columbia University	
Ho-fung Hung		MA	Sociologist and professor in Political Economy at Johns Hopkins University	
Yasmin Hurd	1982		Professor of Neuroscience at the Icahn School of Medicine at Mount Sinai	
Vincent Ialenti	2008	Philosophy, Politics, and Law	Anthropologist, professor at the George Washington University Elliott School of International Affairs and social scientist at the U.S. Department of Energy's Office of Nuclear Energy	
Patricia Ingraham		Ph.D	Founding dean of the College of Community and Public Affairs at Binghamton University	
Steven G. Kellman	1967		Critic, author, and academic	
Anne C. Klein		English	Tibetologist, professor of Religious Studies at Rice University	
Arnold J. Levine	1961		Molecular biologist and president of Rockefeller University	
Stephanie McCurry	1988	Ph.D	Professor of history at the Columbia University	
Michael H. Nash	1968	History	Labor historian, librarian, archivist, and director of the Tamiment Library and Robert F. Wagner Archives at New York University	
Camille Paglia	1968		Critic, author, and professor at University of the Arts	
Robert A. Rubinstein	1977	Ph.D	Distinguished professor of anthropology at Syracuse University	
David R. Segal		BA	Sociologist who specializes in civil-military relations and military organization and founding director of the Center for Research on Military Organization	
Tobin Siebers	1976	MA	Co-chair of the Initiative on Disability Studies and V.L. Parrington Collegiate Professor at the University of Michigan	
Beverly J. Silver	1992	Ph.D	Professor and chair of sociology at Johns Hopkins University	
Deborah Tannen	1966	English literature	Academic and writer on linguistics, discourse analysis, and interpersonal communication	
Peter Ungar	1985	Anthropology	Evolutionary biologist and paleoanthropologist at the University of Arkansas	
Kenneth Waltzer			Historian, educator, and director of the Jewish Studies program at Michigan State University	
David E. Wellbery	1969		Professor of German Studies at the University of Chicago	
Peter Wenz	1967	BA	Professor of Philosophy and Legal Studies at the University of Illinois at Springfield	

== Art and architecture ==
Name	Class	Major	Notability	References
Leland Bobbé	1970	Sociology	Photographer	
Orlando Busino		Non-degreed	Cartoonist for McCalls, Reader's Digest, Good Housekeeping, and Saturday Evening Post	
Tobias Guggenheimer		English literature	Architect	
Art Spiegelman		Non-degreed, Honorary Doctorate	Cartoonist and editor, creator of Maus, winner of a 1992 Pulitzer Prize	

== Business ==
Name	Class	Major	Notability	References
Peter Altabef	1980	Economics	CEO of Unisys	
Joseph H. Boardman	1983	MA Management Science	President and CEO of Amtrak, Commissioner of the New York State Department of Transportation, and director of the United States Federal Railroad Administration	
Arthur Dantchik			Co-founder and managing director of Susquehanna International Group	
Faisal Farooqui	1999		Founder and CEO of MouthShut.com	
Gregg Hymowitz	1987	BA	Chairman, chief executive officer, and founder of EnTrust Global	
Leonard Klevan			Businessman and chemist	
Geraldine MacDonald	1968	MS 1973	Businesswoman and technology executive	
Julie Rice		English and theater	Entrepreneur, founder of SoulCycle	
Thomas Secunda	1977		Co-founder and vice-chairman of Bloomberg L.P	
Bob Swan	1985	MBA	CEO of Intel	
Jay Walder			CEO of Hyperloop One	
Jeff Yass			Co-founder of Susquehanna International Group	
David Zaslav	1982		CEO and president of Warner Bros. Discovery	

== Entertainment ==
Name	Class	Major	Notability	References
Robyn Adele Anderson	2011	Political Science, Arabic	Singer, stage actress, and founding member of Postmodern Jukebox	
William Baldwin	1985	Political Science	Film actor	
Andrew Bergman	1965		Screenwriter, author, and director	
Kevin Bernhardt		Economics, Drama	Screenwriter, film actor, television actor, and producer	
Alan Berliner	1977	Cinema	Emmy Award-winning documentary filmmaker	
Steven Canals	2005, 2008	BA Cinema, MA Student Affairs	Screenwriter and producer	
Kvitka Cisyk		Non-degreed	Opera singer	
Stephanie Courtney	1992	English	Actress and comedian who plays Flo (Progressive Insurance)	
Dena DeRose			Jazz pianist, singer, and educator	
Michael J. Epstein	1998		Filmmaker, musician, and writer	
Steven Fechter			Screenwriter and playwright	
Jen Flanz			Showrunner of The Daily Show	
Jeff Gaspin	1982	Psychology and business administration	Television executive and former Chairman of NBC Universal Television Entertainment	
Louis Giambalvo		BFA and MFA	Television and film actor	
Peter Guttman		Geography	Author, photographer, television personality, and adventurer	
Roger Lee Hall	1972	MA	Composer and musicologist	
Sunny Hostin	1990	English and Rhetoric	Co-host of The View and senior legal correspondent for ABC News	
Marc Huestis		Non-degreed	Filmmaker	
Adam Huss		Drama	Television and film actor, producer, and writer	
Bill T. Jones			Dancer and Tony Award-winning choreographer	
Bang Jun-seok			Film score composer and music director	
Andy Kindler			Actor and comedian	
Marc Lawrence	1981		Screenwriter and director	
Carol Leifer			Stand-up comedian, actress, writer, and producer	
Rebecca Leigh Longendyke	2018	BS in biomedical engineering	Fashion model	
Ingrid Michaelson	2001		Singer-songwriter	
Joe Mele	2018	Finance	Content creator	
Paul C. Morrissey			Comedian and television sports anchor	
Lee Ranaldo	1978		Musician, writer, artist, and guitarist of Sonic Youth	
Paul Reiser	1977		Actor and comedian	
Dave Rubin	1998		Comedian and talk show host	
Ruben Santiago-Hudson	1978		Tony Award-winning actor and playwright	
Karthik Sivakumar			Actor	
John Wilson	2008		Documentary filmmaker	
Arnie Zane			Choreographer, dancer, and co-founder of Bill T. Jones-Arnie Zane and Company	

== Government and civil service ==
Name	Class	Major	Notability	References
Joseph H. Boardman	1983	MA Management Science	Commissioner of the New York State Department of Transportation, director of the United States Federal Railroad Administration, president and CEO of Amtrak	
Barbara J. Fiala			Commissioner of the New York State Department of Motor Vehicles	
Dan French	2003	History	Supervisor of the Town of Beekman, New York	
Vincent Ialenti	2008	Philosophy, Politics, and Law	Social scientist at the U.S. Department of Energy's Office of Nuclear Energy, anthropologist, and professor at the George Washington University Elliott School of International Affairs	
Hakeem Jeffries	1992	Political Science	Congressman in the US House of Representatives, currently serving New York's 8th district; House minority Leader	
John Liu	1988		New York City comptroller	
Aaron Mair	1984	B.A. History and Sociology	Retired State of New York epidemiological-spatial analyst; first African-American president of the national Sierra Club, 2015–2017; formed the Arbor Hill Environmental Justice Corporation	
John Mannion		Biology	Congressman in the US House of Representatives, currently serving New York's 22nd district	
Vincent Schiraldi			Maryland Secretary of Juvenile Services	
Eugene Vindman	1997	History	Congressman in the US House of Representatives, currently serving Virginia's 7th congressional district	
Jay Walder			CEO of the Metropolitan Transportation Authority of New York	

== Law ==
Name	Class	Major	Notability	References
Stanley Blumenfeld		BA	United States district judge of the United States District Court for the Central District of California	
Kathleen Cardone	1976	BA	United States district judge of the United States District Court for the Western District of Texas	
Stanley R. Chesler	1968	BA	United States district judge of the United States District Court for the District of New Jersey	
Jami Floyd	1986	Political Science and Journalism	Legal analyst at Al Jazeera America, former legal editor and host of All Things Considered	
Michael J. Garcia		English literature	Associate judge of the New York Court of Appeals and assistant secretary for Immigration and Customs Enforcement	
Samuel Issacharoff	1975		Law professor, whose scholarly work focuses on constitutional law, voting rights and civil procedure	
Elaine D. Kaplan	1976		Judge of the United States Court of Federal Claims	

== Literature and journalism ==
Name	Class	Major	Notability	References
Diana Abu-Jaber		Ph.D in English and creative writing	Author and professor at Portland State University	
Jonis Agee		MA, Ph.D.	Novelist and writer of short stories, essays, and screenplays	
Samar al-'Aṭṭār		Ph.D	Writer, novelist, and translator	
Grace Andreacchi			Novelist, poet and playwright	
Bruce Benderson			Author	
Mark Mathew Braunstein	1974	BA	Author, nature photographer, and advocate of medical marijuana legalization	
Ron Brownstein	1979	English literature	Journalist, political correspondent, and analyst	
Kevin Carey	1992	Political Science	Journalist, editor, higher education writer, and policy analyst	
Tina Chang	1991	English and Creative Writing	Brooklyn Poet Laureate, Professor of English, Director of Creative Writing, Binghamton University	
Stephen Corey	1971, 1974	BA, MA	Poet and editor of the Georgia Review	
Jack Dann	1968	Social and political science	Writer and editor, best known for his science fiction	
Anita Diamant	1975	MA English	Author of fiction and non-fiction books	
Jake Dobkin		Non-degreed	Journalist, blogger, author, and co-founder of Gothamist	
Marcia Douglas		Ph.D. English	Novelist, poet, and performer	
Nathan Englander	1992		Short story writer and novelist	
Alicia Erian			Novelist	
Norman Finkelstein		BA	Poet and literary critic	
Jeffrey Ford			Fantasy novelist	
Margaux Fragoso	2009	Ph.D	Author	
Lisa Rowe Fraustino		Ph.D	Children's author and editor	
Shalom Freedman	1964		Writer and poet	
Robert Greenberger			Writer and editor	
Carlos Hernandez	2000	Ph.D. English	Writer of science fiction and fantasy	
J. Hoberman		BA	Journalist and senior film critic at The Village Voice	
Stephen Kalinich		Non-degreed	Poet known for his songwriting collaborations with Brian and Dennis Wilson	
Patricia Kennealy-Morrison	1967	English literature	Author, editor, and journalist	
Michael Lederer	1981		Author	
Liz Rosenberg			Poet and writer	
John Simpson		Philosophy	Journalist and consumer rights advocate	
Donald E. Westlake		Non-degreed	Novelist and screenwriter	
Jillian York	2004		Journalist	

== Medicine ==
Name	Class	Major	Notability	References
Jill Afrin	1984	Biochemistry	Psychiatrist who specializes in working with deaf populations	
Garnet Anderson	1983	MA Mathematics	Biostatistician and senior vice president at the Fred Hutchinson Cancer Research Center	
Caitlin Bernard	2006	Human Development and Biology	Obstetrician-gynecologist, reproductive and abortion rights activist, and assistant professor in the Department of Obstetrics and Gynecology Indiana University School of Medicine	
Camille A. Clare	1992	Psychobiology	Chair of the department of obstetrics and gynecology at SUNY Downstate Medical Center	
Daniel Herschlag	1982	Biochemistry	Biochemist and professor of biochemistry at the Stanford University School of Medicine	
Yasmin Hurd			Chair of Translational Neuroscience, director of the Addiction Institute at Mount Sinai	
Mona Jhaveri			Cancer researcher and entrepreneur focusing on biotech funding	
Ellyn Kaschak	1965	Russian language and literature	Clinical psychologist, retired professor	
Merle Keitel	1980		Psychologist, author, and academic	
Michael Shernoff	1977		Psychotherapist who specialized in serving the mental health needs of gay, lesbian, and bisexual people	

== Military ==
Name	Class	Major	Notability	References
Alex Vindman	1998		Lieutenant colonel in the United States Army; the first witness to appear in President Trump's impeachment probe	

== Politics ==
Name	Class	Major	Notability	References
Mia Ackerman		Political economics	Rhode Island House of Representatives	
Morteza Aghatehrani		Ph.D. Middle Eastern studies	Parliament of Iran, cleric, scholar, mujtahid	
Linda Arrigo	1996	Ph.D	Political activist, human rights activist, and former international affairs officer of Green Party Taiwan	
Marianne Buttenschon		MA Public Policy	Member of the New York State Assembly	
Robert Carroll			Member of the New York State Assembly	
Amy Dacey	1993	Political Science and History	CEO of the Democratic National Committee	
Rich David	2002	Master of Public Administration	Mayor of Binghamton, New York	
Ed DeLaney		B.A. and an M.A	Member of the Indiana House of Representatives	
Eric Dinowitz			Member of the New York City Council	
Steven Fulop	1993		Mayor of Jersey City, New Jersey	
Muhammad Abdul Ghaffar Abdulla			Bahraini ambassador	
Bethaida González		Political Science and Latin American studies	Syracuse Common Council and Syracuse School Board	
Barry Grodenchik		History and economics	New York City Council	
Debbie Holmes		MA Chemistry	Politician from Idaho	
Monique Holsey-Hyman	1986	Human services and sociology	Durham city councilwoman, social worker, and professor at North Carolina Central University	
Hori Horibata			Member of the Philippines House of Representatives from Camarines Sur 1st District	
Amy J. Hyatt		Political science and history	United States ambassador to Palau	
Hakeem Jeffries	1992		New York State Assembly and United States House of Representatives	
Anna Kelles	1997	BA Biology and Environmental Studies	New York State Assembly	
Donna Lupardo	1983	MA	New York State Assembly	
John Mannion	1990	BA Biology	New York State Senate	
Monica Martinez	1999		New York State Senate	

== Science and technology ==
Name	Class	Major	Notability	References
Denise Cox	1980	Geology	Petroleum geologist who worked with the United States Geological Survey	
Sean Egan		Computer Science	Software engineer at Google, where he worked on Google Talk and Google Maps	
David Grimaldi			Entomologist and curator of Invertebrate Zoology at the American Museum of Natural History	
Mike Hudak	1975, 1986	BA Mathematics, Ph.D. Advanced Technology	Environmental researcher, author, and Sierra Club activist	
Frances Hurwitz	1966	Chemistry	Materials research engineer at NASA Glenn Center	
Geraldine MacDonald		Psychology	Internet and online services pioneer who built the world's largest dial-up network for America Online	

== Sports ==
Name	Class	Major	Notability	References
Scott Diamond			Former MLB pitcher for the Minnesota Twins	
Scott Donnelly		Non-degreed	College soccer coach	
Jason Houghtaling			College and professional football coach	
Duane James			Professional basketball player	
Jake Keegan	2012		Professional soccer player	
Tony Kornheiser	1970	English literature	Sports commentator, finalist for the 1997 Pulitzer Prize for Commentary	
Emily Mackay	2020	Psychology	Middle- and long-distance runner	
Robert Moewes	2017	Business Administration	Professional soccer player	
Stanley Ocitti	2003		Professional basketball player	
Ryan Pierce			Professional soccer player	
Calvin Poulina			Professional basketball player	
Tim Sinicki		Non-degreed	College baseball coach	
Murphy Smith	2009		Professional baseball player	
Kaan Tayla			Freestyle swimmer at the 2004 Summer Olympics	
Qu Yun		BA Human Development, MS Sports Psychology	Butterfly stroke swimmer	
