= List of Binghamton University honorary degree recipients =

This is a list of honorary degree recipients from Binghamton University in New York.

Name of recipient	Year	Note
Edwin Link	1981	Inventor and father of simulation technology
David de Wied	1981	Discoverer of neuropeptides
Charles Singleton	1981	Professor emeritus of humanistic studies, Johns Hopkins University
Paul Oskar Kristeller	1982	Professor of philosophy, Columbia University
David Soyer, Arnold Steinhardt and Michael Tree	1983	Founding members of the Guarneri Quartet
René Wellek	1983	Sterling Professor Emeritus of Comparative Literature, Yale University
Thomas G. Bergin	1984	Sterling Professor Emeritus of Romance Languages, Yale University
Abraham J. Briloff	1984	Professor of accounting and financial ethicist
Helen Mary Caldicott	1984	Physician and activist
Leroy "Slam" Stewart	1984	Jazz musician
Kenneth Clark	1985	Psychologist
Roald Hoffmann	1985	Theoretical chemist and 1981 Nobel Prize in Chemistry recipient
Winfred Lehmann	1985	Ashbel Smith Professor of Linguistics and German Languages, University of Texas
Eliezer Wiesel	1985	Andrew Mellon Professor in the Humanities, Boston University
Morton Bloomfield	1986	Professor emeritus of English and American literature and language, Harvard University
Stephen Jay Gould	1986	Evolutionary biologist and historian of science
Paul D. Maclean (MD)	1986	Intramural research scientist, National Institute of Mental Health
Josef Skvorecky	1986	Professor of English, University of Toronto
Brian Urquhart	1986	Under-secretary of the United Nations
Manfred Lachs	1987	Judge on the International Court of Justice
Bernard Lewis	1987	Cleveland E. Dodge Professor of Near Eastern Studies, Princeton University
John Hope Franklin	1988	Historian
Alvin Liberman	1988	Speech psychologist
Aryeh Neier	1988	Human rights activist and founder of Americas Watch
Lewis Branscomb	1989	Professor, John F. Kennedy School of Government, Harvard University
Majid Khadduri	1989	Distinguished research professor, Johns Hopkins School of Advanced International Studies
Lofti Zadeh	1989	Professor of electrical engineering and computer sciences, University of California, Berkeley
Byllye Avery	1990	Founder and director, National Black Women's Health Network
Leszek Kolakowski	1990	Senior research fellow, All Souls' College, Oxford University
Jacob Lawrence	1990	Professor of art, University of Washington
Andrew Rutherford	1990	Warden, Goldsmiths' College, University of London
Gunther Wilke	1990	Director, Max Planck Institute for Coal Research
Jerome Frank	1991	Psychiatrist and psychologist, professor emeritus, Johns Hopkins University School of Medicine
Niara Sudarkasa	1991	African-American anthropologist and educator
Jack Kilby	1992	Nobel Laureate and co-inventor of the integrated circuit
Johnnetta Cole	1993	President, Spelman College
Deborah Tannen	1993	Linguist and author
Andrew Bergman	1994	Film producer
John Cairns	1994	University distinguished professor of environmental biology, director of University Center for Environmental Studies and Hazardous Materials Studies, Virginia Polytechnic Institute and State University
Mary Lowe Good	1994	Senior vice president for technology, Allied SIgnal, Inc.
Matthew McHugh	1994	Counselor to the president, The World Bank
William Julius Wilson	1994	Director and Lucy Flower University Professor of Sociology and Public Policy, University of Chicago, Center for the Study of Urban Inequity
Ilya Prigogine	1995	Noble Laureate in chemistry
Art Spiegelman	1995	Pulitzer Prize-winning graphic artist
Chinua Achebe	1996	Author
Shirley Chater	1996	Educator and administrator; Commissioner, Social Security Administration
Willhelm Gispen	1996	Leading scholar on the functioning of the brain
Donald Westlake	1996	Author of over 100 novels and non-fiction titles
Linda Gordon	1997	Historian
Maxine Greene	1997	Scholar and teacher in the philosophy and history of education, curriculum studies, teacher education and aesthetic education
Walter Isard	1997	Economist and founder of the discipline of peace science
Arnold Levine	1997	Molecular biologist and discoverer of tumor suppressant protein
Israel Rosefsky	1997	Pediatrician and philanthropist
Rodrigo Carazo	1998	Former president of United Nationals, established University of Peace
Susan Clark-Johnson	1998	President/publisher, journalist, editor, Gannett
C. Peter Magrath	1998	President of NASULGC, former president of Binghamton University, former University of Minnesota president
George Olah	1998	Scholar, researcher in superacids and carbocation chemistry
Robert W. Fogel	1999	Economic historian and early advocate of using quantitative methods in history
Mary Francis Berry	1999	Former chair of the United States Commission on Civil Rights
David Komansky	1999	Chairman of the board and COO of Merrill Lynch Pierce Fenner Smith
Kurt Masur	1999	Music director, New York Philharmonic
R. Nicholas Burns	2000	U.S. Ambassador to Greece
Steve Kroft	2000	Television journalist
Shari Lawrence Pfleeger	2000	President, Systems Software, Inc., founder of Howard University's Center for Research in Evaluating Software, alumna 1970
Paul Reiser	2000	Author, actor and comedian, alumnus 1977
Loretta Ford	2001	Founding dean and dean emeritus, University of Rochester, leader/pioneer in nurse practitioner model
Stewart Paperin	2001	Former Executive vice president, Open Society Institute, alumnus 1968 and 1969
Robert Pinsky	2001	Poetry editor, 1997-2000 Poet Laureate
Freeman Hrabowski III	2002	President, University of Maryland, African-American leader, nationally acclaimed educator
Gary Kunis	2002	Former vice president and chief science officer for Cisco Systems, Inc
Elmar Oliveira	2002	Classical violinist
Kemal Guruz	2003	President, Turkish Council of Higher Education
Dean Kamen	2003	Engineer, entrepreneur, inventor
Alan MacDiarmid	2003	2000 Novel Prize winner in chemistry, Blanchard Professor of Chemistry, University of Pennsylvania
Mark A. Zurack	2003	Former executive vice president, Goldman Sachs
Sydney Pollack	2003	Author and film producer
Edgar Bronfman	2004	President, World Jewish Congress, chairman of International Board of Governors for Hillel
Eugene DeLoatch	2004	Dean of School of Engineering, Morgan State University, first African- American president of American Society for Engineering
Charlene Kahlor Kramer	2004	Vice president of Corporate Letters Communications, Federal National Mortgage Association (Fannie Mae), alumna 1973
Ezra Laderman	2004	President, American Music Center
Ada Sue Hinshaw	2005	Founding director of the National Institute for Nursing Research of the National Institutes of Health (NIH), dean of School of Nursing, University of Michigan
Evelyn Glennie	2006	Scottish percussionist and timpanist
Erwin Goldberg	2006	Professor of biochemistry, molecular biology and cell biology, Northwestern University, alumnus 1956
Linda Greenhouse	2006	Pulitzer Prize-winning journalist
Allan Lyons	2007	Accountant, financier, educator and business leader
J. David Singer	2007	Political scientist and educator
Ronald Ehrenberg	2008	Irving M. Ives Professor of Industrial and Labor Relations and Economics, Cornell University, alumnus 1966
Richard Felder	2008	Hoechst Celanse Professor Emeritus of Chemical Engineering, North Carolina State University
Theodore Kooser	2008	Former U.S. Poet Laureate and Pulitzer Prize winner for poetry
Raymond Osterhout	2008	Philanthropist, retired group vice president and underwriting and marketing manager, Swiss Reinsurance Corporation
David Sedaris	2008	Author and humorist
Geoffrey Canada	2009	Social welfare administrator, educator and writer
Sandra Day O'Connor	2009	United States Supreme Court Justice
Mario Paniccia	2009	Director, Photonics Technology Lab, Corporate Technology Group, Intel Corporation, alumnus 1988
Lawrence Schorr	2009	Attorney and philanthropist, alumnus 1975 and 1977
Ahmet Acar	2010	Rector/professor, Middle East Technical University, Turkey
Steven Bloom	2010	Philanthropist, financial analyst, alumnus 1978
Terrence Keane	2011	Professor and vice chairman in psychiatry, Boston University, alumnus 1976 and 1979
David Orr	2011	Paul Sears Distinguished Professor and chair, environmental studies program at Oberlin College
Owen C. Pell	2011	International litigator, alumnus 1980
James Carrigg	2012	Watson School founder and retired president, chairman and CEO of New York State Electric & Gas
Steve Karmen	2012	Composer, musician, arranger, author
Paul Turovsky	2012	Philanthropist, founding partner, True North Management Group, alumnus 1973
Mary Wakefield	2012	Administrator, Health Resources and Services Administration
Marilyn Link	2013	Pioneering Pilot, educator, philanthropist and managing director of an oceanographic institute
Voya Markovich	2013	Leading expert in advanced electronics packaging
Nancy Wackstein	2013	Preeminent social worker and champion of the homeless and disadvantaged, alumnus 1973
George Whitesides	2013	Prolific and influential scientist in chemistry, materials science, physics and engineering
Carol C. Harter	2014	Academic administrator and English language editor, alumnus 1964
Eric P. Schwartz	2014	Public policy scholar, public servant and international humanitarian and human rights expert, alumnus 1979
Deborah Gray White	2014	Academian and influential historian of African-American and American women's history, alumnus 1971
Horace Wood Gibson, Jr.	2015	Renaissance man and educator
Jason Randolph Stanley	2015	Educator and philosopher
Tien Wu	2015	CEO and member of the board of Advanced Semiconductor Engineering, Inc.
John R. Bartle	2016	Dean of the college of Public Affairs and Community Service, and professor of public administration, University of Omaha, Nebraska
Marc D. Lawrence	2016	Screenwriter, producer, director, alumnus 1981
Nathan Englander	2017	Award-winning author, playwright and translator, alumnus 1991
Anthony I. Kornheiser	2017	Sports journalist and commentator, alumnus 1971
Geraldine MacDonald	2017	Pioneer of internet communications, alumnus 1968
Sergio Rapu Haoa	2017	Archeologist and cultural ambassador for Rapa Nui, Chile
Ali Çarkoğlu	2018	Educator, higher education administrator and political commentator, alumnus 1994
Asunción "Sunny" C. Hostin	2018	Columnist, social commentator and multi-platform journalist, alumnus 1990
Aaron Mair	2018	Founder of the environmental justice movement, alumnus 1984
Balakrishna Gopalan Iyer	2019	Business leader and educator, alumnus 2000
Patricia A. Saunders	2019	Humanitarian and student-athlete advocate, alumnus 1965
Howard Unger	2019	Financial innovator and world peace advocate, alumnus 1982
Robert H. Swan	2022	Leader of several online corporations, alumnus 1985
Yasmin L. Hurd	2024	Studied neurobiology of substance use and associated disorders
Lee Ranaldo	2024	Musician who co-founded the band Sonic Youth
Alexander S. Vindman	2024	Former colonel in the U.S. Army
Govindasamy Viswanathan	2024	Founded the Vellore Institute of Technology
Amy J. Hyatt	2025	Served for more than 30 years with the U.S. Department of State Foreign Service
Tyrone E. Muse	2025	President and Chief Executive Officer of Visions Federal Credit Union
Michael D. Timmeny	2025	Former Senior Vice President of Cisco Systems Inc.
Stuart F. Koenig	2025	Senior Advisor at LeadCrest Capital Partners
