= Afrin =

Afrin may refer to:

== Places ==
- Afrin Canton, one of the cantons of the de facto autonomous Democratic Federation of Northern Syria
- Afrin District, a district of Aleppo Governorate in northern Syria. The administrative centre is the city of Afrin
- Afrin Subdistrict, a subdistrict of the Afrin District
- Afrin Region, the westernmost of the three regions of the de facto autonomous Democratic Federation of Northern Syria
- Afrin River, a river in Turkey and Syria
  - Afrin Dam, dam on the Afrin River in northwest Syria
- Afrin, Syria, a city in northwestern Syria, administratively part of Aleppo Governorate

== Institutions ==
- Afrin SC, a football club based in Afrin, Syria
- University of Afrin, an unrecognized university established in the city of Afrin by the Afrin Canton Board of Education

== Products ==
- Oxymetazoline, sold under the brand name Afrin in the United States, is an over-the-counter nasal spray medication to treat congestion

== People ==
=== Given name ===
- Afrin Ali (born 1986), Indian politician

=== Surname ===
- Jill Afrin (born 1962), psychiatrist
- Nahid Afrin (born 2001), Indian playback singer
- Narin Afrin (born c. 1974), militant
