= ACM SIGUCCS Hall of Fame Award =

The Association for Computing Machinery Special Interest Group on University and College Computing Services Hall of Fame Award was established by the Association for Computing Machinery to recognize individuals whose specific contributions have had a positive impact on the organization and therefore on the professional careers of the members and their institutions.

== Recipients ==
- 2000 Alicia Ewing Towster
- 2000 Frank A Thomas
- 2000 John E Skelton
- 2000 Gordon R Sherman
- 2000 Rita Seplowitz Saltz
- 2000 Robert W Lutz
- 2000 Ralph E Lee
- 2000 William Heinbecker
- 2000 Jane Shearin Caviness
- 2000 Jean Bonney
- 2001 James R Wruck
- 2001 Barbara Wolfe
- 2001 Lawrence W Westermeyer
- 2001 Russel S Vaught
- 2001 Jerry Niebaum
- 2001 James L Moss
- 2001 Polley Ann McClure
- 2001 Elizabeth R Little
- 2001 Priscilla Jane Huston
- 2001 John H "Jack" Esbin
- 2002 Terris Wolff
- 2002 Lois Secrist
- 2002 Jerry Martin
- 2002 Carl Malstrom
- 2002 Geraldine MacDonald
- 2002 Sheri Prupis
- 2002 Larry Pickett
- 2002 Diane Jung
- 2002 Fred Harris
- 2002 John Bucher
- 2003 Michael Yohe
- 2003 Vincent H Swoyer
- 2003 Beth Ruffo
- 2003 Dennis Mar
- 2003 Leila C Lyons
- 2003 Linda Hutchison
- 2003 Tex Hull
- 2003 Patrick J Gossman
- 2004 Stan Yagi
- 2004 Alan Herbert
- 2004 Susan Nycum
- 2004 Greydon D Freeman
- 2004 Lida Larsen
- 2004 M Lloyd Edwards
- 2004 Thea Drell Hodge
- 2004 Linda Downing
- 2005 Mervin E Muller
- 2005 Glen R Ingram
- 2005 Jennifer Fajman
- 2005 Jim Bostick
- 2005 Kay K Beach
- 2006 Leland H Williams
- 2006 Chris Jones
- 2006 Marion F Taylor
- 2006 John W Hamblen
- 2006 Glenda E Moum
- 2006 Jayne Ashworth
- 2007 Shiree Moreland
- 2007 Phil Isensee
- 2007 Kathy Mayberry
- 2007 Bonnie Hites
- 2007 Jeanne Kellogg
- 2007 Susan Hales
- 2008 Jerry Smith
- 2008 Robert Paterson
- 2008 John Lateulere
- 2008 Jack McCredie
- 2009 Glenn Ricart
- 2009 Lynnell Lacy
- 2009 Teresa Lockard
- 2009 Jim Kerlin
- 2009 Nancy Bauer
- 2010 Jennifer "Jen" Whiting
- 2010 Ann Amsler
- 2011 Richard Nelson
- 2011 Alex Nagorski
- 2011 Timothy Foley
- 2012 No recipients
- 2013 Jim Yucha
- 2013 Christine Vucinich
- 2013 Leila Shahbender
- 2013 Cindy Sanders
- 2013 Carol Rhodes
- 2013 Patti Mitch
- 2013 Greg Hanek
- 2013 Gale Fritsche
- 2014 Elizabeth Wagnon
- 2014 Robert Haring-Smith
- 2014 Parrish Nnambi
- 2014 Karen McRitchie
- 2015 Jacquelynn Hongosh
- 2016 Debbie Fisher
- 2016 Naomi Fujimura
- 2016 Takashi Yamanoue
- 2017 Melissa Bauer
- 2017 Allan Chen
- 2017 Beth Rugg
- 2017 Kelly Wainwright
- 2018 Miranda Carney-Morris
- 2018 Trevor Murphy
- 2018 Mo Nishiyama
- 2018 Gail Rankin
- 2019 No recipients
- 2020 Chester Andrews
- 2020 Mat Felthousen
- 2020 Dan Herrick
- 2020 Chris King
- 2020 Becky Lineberry

== See also ==
- List of computer science awards
