= José L. Domingo =

Spanish editor and distinguished professor of toxicology

José Luis Domingo (born 1951 in Tortosa, Catalonia, Spain) is a Spanish toxicologist and distinguished professor of toxicology at Rovira i Virgili University.

== Education and career ==
Domingo attended the University of Barcelona, from which he received two chemistry degrees: an undergraduate degree in 1972 and a doctorate in 1982. In 1991, he became a full professor of toxicology at the University of Barcelona; two years later, he assumed the same position at Rovira i Virgili University. In 2006, he was named a distinguished professor by Rovira i Virgili University.

== Research ==
Domingo's research focuses on, among other topics, the potential human health effects of environmental and food contaminants. This includes genetically modified foods, and he has argued that not enough independent studies have been done regarding their potential adverse effects. He has also published review articles concluding that there are only a limited number of safety assessment studies of genetically modified foods, and has been critical of the concept of "substantial equivalence" as it relates to such foods.

== Honors, awards and positions ==
Domingo is the editor-in-chief of the scientific journal Environmental Research and was editor-in-chief of Food and Chemical Toxicology. He has also been the co-editor-in-chief of Human and Ecological Risk Assessment, the editor of the reviews section of Environment International, and has served on the editorial boards of more than seven other journals. He is also a member of multiple professional societies, including the Society of Toxicology, the American Academy of Clinical Toxicology, and the Society for Experimental Biology and Medicine. In 2014, and again in 2015, he was named an ISI highly cited researcher. He is the winner of Eurotox Merit award 2023.
