= Joshua DeAngelis =

American media executive

Josh DeAngelis
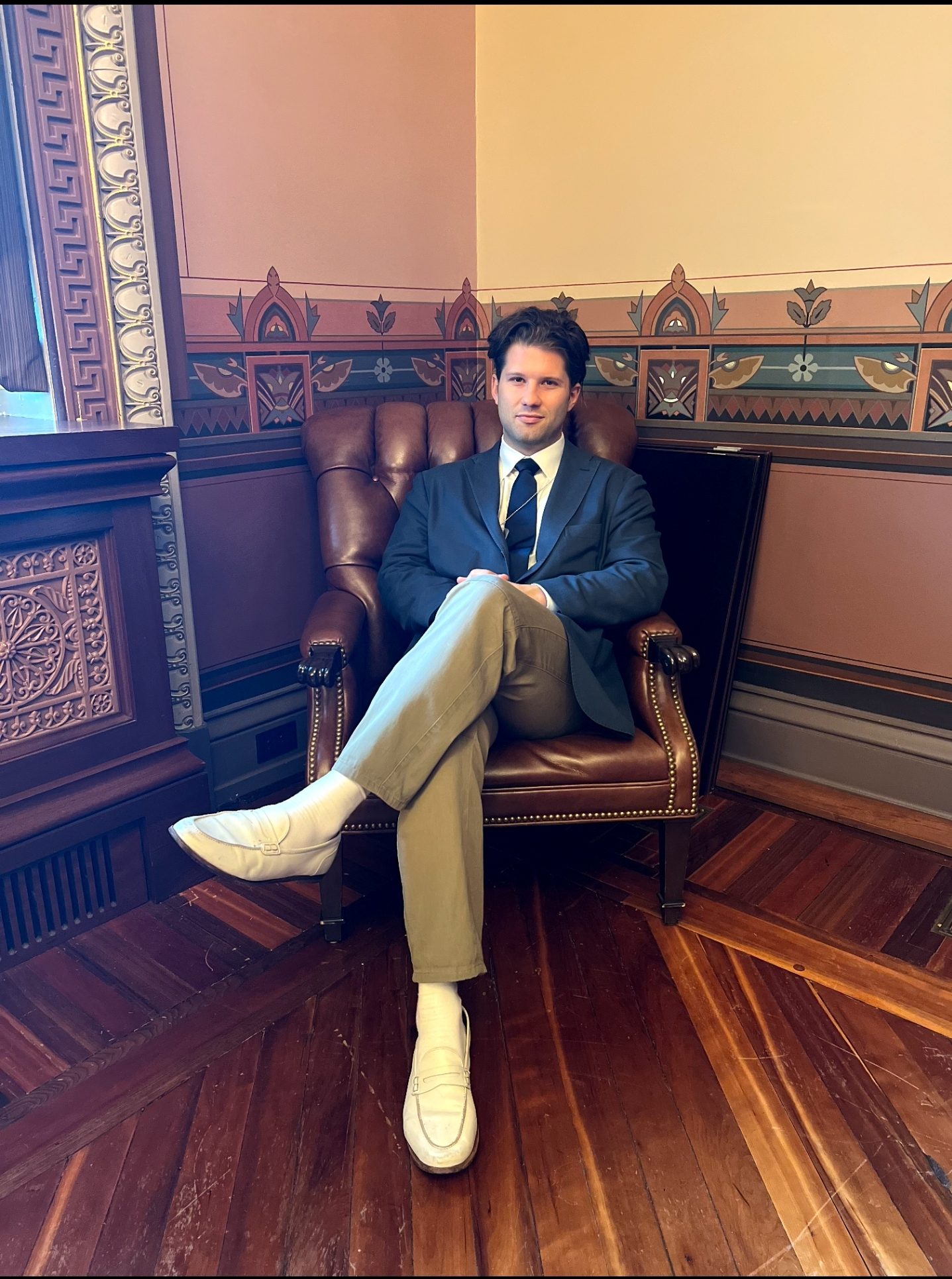
- Born: Joshua DeAngelis
- Citizenship: American
- Occupation: Business executive
- Years active: 2020–present
- Title: Founder

Joshua 'Josh' DeAngelis is an American media executive. He is the co-founder and president of talent at Palette Media.

== Background ==
DeAngelis earned a bachelor's degree in economics from Northwestern University and a master's degree in sports management from Columbia University.

== Career ==
In April 2020, he founded Palette media alongside Daniel Daks. Before co-founding Palette Media, DeAngelis served as project manager at First Access Entertainment, worked as tour manager for the music duo Lion Babe, and held multiple positions at Roc Nation. He was an artist manager who has worked in music, sports, and fashion for over a decade, with his collaborations including Madison Beer, Santigold, Zayn, USA Football, UC Berkeley Athletics, and Gucci Ghost. Palette Media manages influencers across platforms including Anania, Joe Mele, Chrissy Chlapecka, Meet Cutes NYC amongst others, and has brokered brand partnerships with companies such as Netflix and Amazon. He oversees the company's creator partnerships and talent operations, while Daks serves as the managing partner. DeAngelis worked on influencer driven political campaigns, including efforts during the 2020 U.S. presidential elections. DeAngelis has been associated with discussions around TikTok's role in digital media and the impact of potential regulatory restrictions and was also linked to digital campaigns and influencer-led initiatives. By 2023, Palette Media represented more than 100 creators with a combined audience in the hundreds of millions.

== Recognition ==
DeAngelis has appeared at creator economy events, including as a speaker at Bild Expo.
