= Paul Morrissey (disambiguation) =

Paul Morrissey (1938–2024) was an American film director.

Paul Morrissey may also refer to:

- Paul Morrissey (comics), comic book editor and writer
- Paul Morrissey (hurler) (born 1980), Irish hurler
- Paul C. Morrissey, comedian
