= Philip G. Hodge =

American engineer

Philip G. Hodge Jr.
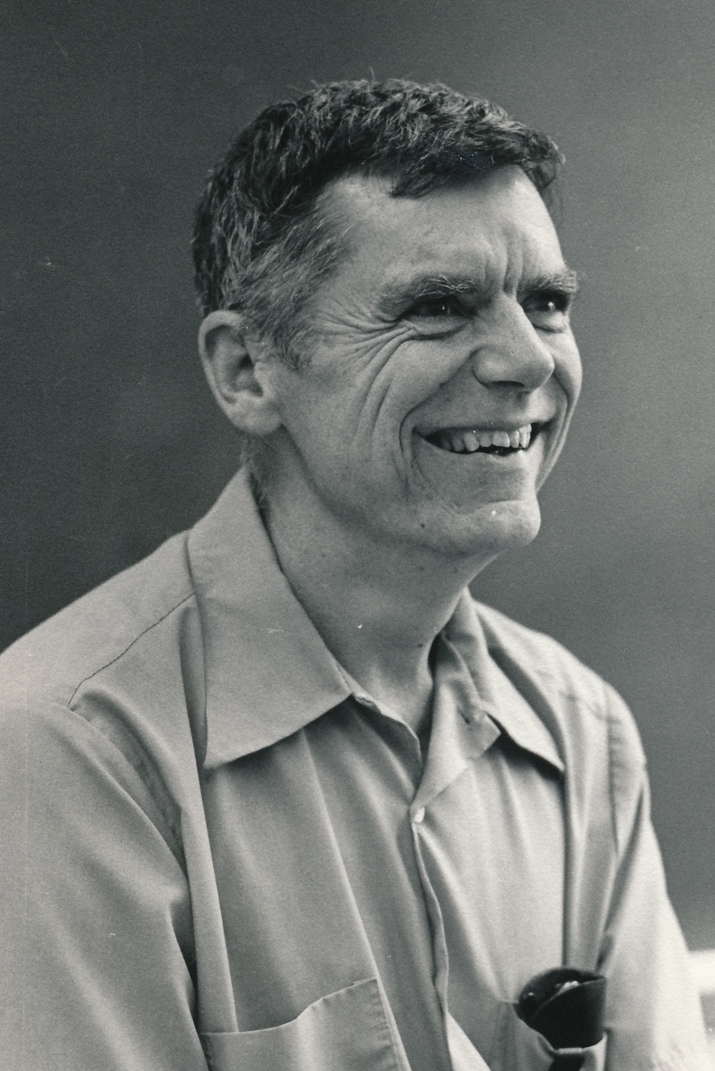
- Born: Philip Gibson Hodge Jr. November 9, 1920; New Haven, Connecticut, U.S.
- Died: November 11, 2014 (aged 94); Sunnyvale, California, U.S.
- Education: Antioch College; Brown University
- Spouse: Thea D. Hodge
- Children: 3
- Engineering career
- Discipline: Mechanical Engineering
- Institutions: Brown University; Illinois Institute of Technology; University of Minnesota
- Significant advance: Advancement in plasticity theory
- Awards: Theodore von Karman Medal (1985); ASME Medal (1987); Drucker Medal (2000)

Philip Gibson Hodge Jr. (November 9, 1920 – November 11, 2014) was an American engineer who specialized in mechanics of elastic and plastic behavior of materials. His work resulted in significant advancements in plasticity theory including developments in the method of characteristics, limit-analysis, piecewise linear isotropic plasticity, and nonlinear programming applications. Hodge was the technical editor of American Society of Mechanical Engineers Journal of Applied Mechanics from 1971-1976. From 1984 to 2000 he was the secretary of the U. S. National Committee on Theoretical and Applied Mechanics, its longest serving Secretary. In 1949 he became assistant professor of Mathematics at UCLA, then moved on to become associate professor of applied mechanics at Polytechnic Institute of Brooklyn in 1953, Professor of Mechanics at Illinois Institute of Technology in 1957, and professor of mechanics at the University of Minnesota in 1971, where he remained until he retired in 1991. After retirement he was professor emeritus at the University of Minnesota and visiting professor emeritus at Stanford University.

== Education ==
Philip Hodge received a BA in mathematics from Antioch College in 1943. During World War II, he joined the US Merchant Marine, where he served throughout the war. Upon his return he earned a PhD from Brown University in Applied Mathematics in 1949, where he was a student of William Prager.

== Awards ==
- 2000 - ASME Daniel C. Drucker Medal by the American Society of Mechanical Engineers
- 1987 - ASME Medal by the American Society of Mechanical Engineers
- 1985 - Theodore von Karman Medal by the American Society of Civil Engineers
- 1984 - Distinguished Service Award by the American Academy of Mechanics
- 1983 - Euler Medal by the USSR Academy of Sciences
- 1975 - Worcester Reed Warner Medal by the American Society of Mechanical Engineers

== Memberships and fellowships ==
- Member of the United States National Academy of Engineering elected in 1977

== Books ==
- Prager, William; Hodge, Philip G Jr. (1951). Theory of Perfectly Plastic Solids. John Wiley & Sons. LCCN 51-012695.
- Goodier, J.N. Jr.; Hodge, Philip G Jr. (1958). Elasticity and Plasticity. John Wiley & Sons. LCCN 58-006750.
- Hodge, Philip G Jr. (1981). Plastic Analysis of Structures. Krieger Publishing Company. LCCN 80-026340.
- Hodge, Philip G Jr. (1963). Limit Analysis of Rotationally Symmetric Plates and Shells. Prentice-Hall Inc. LCCN 63-016582.
- Hodge, Philip G Jr. (1970). Continuum Mechanics. McGraw-Hill Book Company. LCCN 70-090012.

== Personal life ==
He married Thea D. Hodge (née Theresa E. Drell) in 1943, and they have three children.

== Other Achievements ==
- 1982 Twin Cities Marathon, Winner Master's Division Men 60-69
