= Valery E. Forbes =

American ecologist

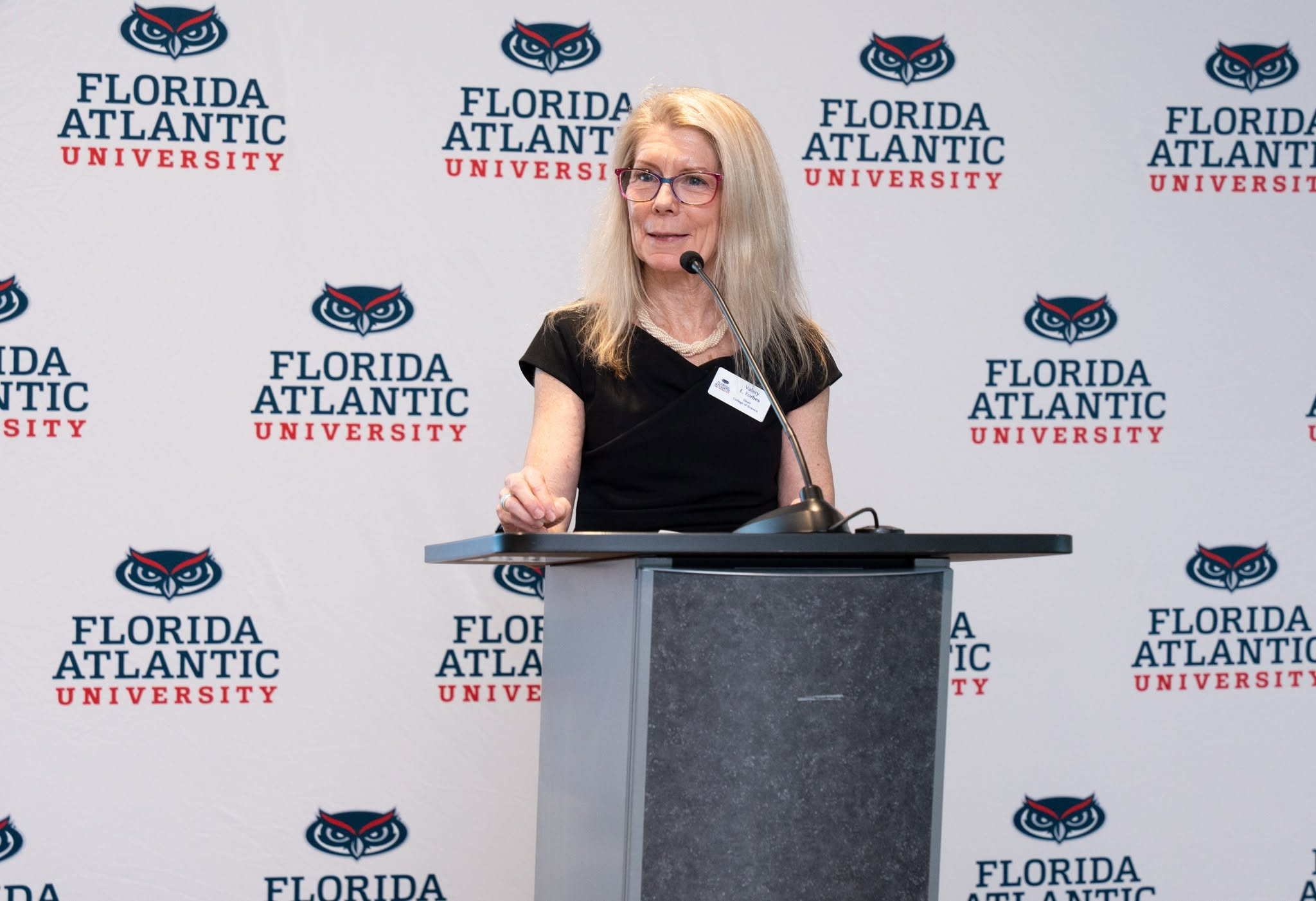
- Valery Forbes hosting the Spring 2026 Future Doctors' Reception at Florida Atlantic.
- Born: November 14, 1961, Yonkers, New York
- Education: Stony Brook University, Binghamton University
- Occupation: Scientist
- Writing career
- Notable awards: Doctor Honoris Causa, Roskilde University, Denmark, 2022; Helmholtz International Fellow, 2018

Valery E. Forbes is an American ecologist and professor specializing in environmental toxicology. Since the start of the 2022-2023 academic season, she has been Dean of the Charles E. Schmidt College of Science at Florida Atlantic University. Prior to this, she served as Dean of the College of Biological Sciences at University of Minnesota (2015-2022), Director of the School of Biological Sciences at University of Nebraska-Lincoln (2011-2015), and Founding Head of the Department of Environmental, Social and Spatial Change at Roskilde University, Denmark (2006-2011).Her research expertise is in ecotoxicology, where she primarily studies effects of environmental stressors, such as toxic chemicals, on organisms at different levels of biological organization.

== Education ==
As an undergraduate student, Forbes received B. A.'s in Biology and Geology from Binghamton University in 1983. She later attended Stony Brook University, completing her M.S. in Marine Environmental Science in 1984, and her PhD in Coastal Oceanography in 1988.

== Scientific contributions ==
Forbes' research is aimed at improving environmental management through increased understanding of how risks, such as exposure to toxic chemicals and environmental changes, impact ecological systems. With over 400 publications and a google scholar h-index 60, Forbes is an internationally recognized expert in assessing risks to complex ecological systems using population modeling. Her expertise led to her participation in an advisory group formed to advise SETAC-Europe about using mechanistic effect models for ecological risk assessment of chemicals.

== Awards and honors ==
- Recognized among the world's top 2% of scientists, 2025
- Elected to Phi Kappa Phi, 2023
- Awarded Honorary Doctor Degree (Doctor Honoris Causa) by Roskilde University, Denmark, 2022
- Named Helmholtz International Fellow, 2018
- Fellow of the University of Minnesota Institute of the Environment, 2018-2022
- Member of the Board of Directors, Minnesota Freshwater Society, 2016-2022
- Fulbright Scholar, Odense University, Denmark, 1989

== Professional activities ==
- Senior Editor, Integrated Environmental Assessment and Management, 2021-Present
- Editorial Board, PeerJ, 2017–2019
- Editorial Board, Integrated Environmental Assessment and Management, 2018–2021
- Editorial Board, Human and Ecological Risk Assessment, 2005–Present
- Editorial Board, Marine Environmental Research, 2000–2021
- Invited Member of the Spinoza Prize Selection Committee, Netherlands Organization for Scientific Research, 2013–2016
- Editorial Board, Ecotoxicology and Environmental Safety, 2004-2013
- Director, Center for Integrated Population Ecology (CIPE), 2005-2009
- Director, Centre for Integrated Population Ecology, 2005–2009
- Member, NATO Environmental Security Panel, 2004-2006
- Danish Natural Sciences Research Council Member, 2001–2007

== Most highly cited works ==
- Forbes VE, Palmqvist A, Bach L. 2006. The use and misuse of biomarkers in ecotoxicology. Environ Toxicol Chem. 25:272-280.
- Forbes VE, Calow P. 1999. Is the per capita rate of increase a good measure of population-level effects in ecotoxicology? Environ Toxicol Chem 18(7): 1544-1556. [among the top 100 most-cited papers in Environ Toxicol Chem between 1982-2012]
- Forbes VE, Forbes TL. 1994. Ecotoxicology in Theory and Practice. Chapman and Hall Ltd., London, 241p. ISBN 978-0-412-43530-0
- Forbes VE, Calow P. 2002. Species sensitivity distributions revisited: a critical appraisal. Human and Ecological Risk Assessment (HERA) 8: 473-492.
- Forbes VE. 2000. Is hormesis an evolutionary expectation? Funct Ecol 14: 12-24.
- Forbes VE, Calow P, Sibly RM. 2008. The extrapolation problem and how population modeling can help. Environ Toxicol Chem. 27:1987-1994.
- Calow P, Forbes VE. 2003. Does ecotoxicology inform ecological risk assessment? Environmental Science and Technology 37:146A-151A.
- Forbes VE, Calow P. 2002. Population growth rate as a basis for ecological risk assessment of toxic chemicals. Phil Trans Roy Soc Series B 357: 1299-1306.
- Nienstedt K, Brock T, van Wensem J, Montforts M, Hart A, Hardy A, Aagaard A, Alix A, Boesten J, Bopp SK, Brown C, Capri E, Forbes VE, Köpp H, Liess M, Luttik R, Maltby L, Sousa P, Streissl F. 2012. Development of a framework based on an ecosystem services approach for deriving specific protection goals for environmental risk assessment of pesticides. Sci Tot Environ 415: 31-38.
- Calow P, Sibly R, Forbes VE. 1997. Risk assessment on the basis of simplified life-history scenarios. Environ Toxicol Chem 16:1983-1989.
