= Thea D. Hodge =

American computer scientist

Thea Drell Hodge
- Born: Theresa E. Drell; November 8, 1922; Atlantic City, New Jersey, U.S.
- Died: March 3, 2008 (aged 85); Menlo Park, California, U.S.
- Burial place: Alta Mesa Memorial Park, Palo Alto, California, U.S.
- Education: Hunter College
- Occupation: Computer scientist
- Spouse: Philip G. Hodge
- Children: 3
- Parents: Tully Drell (father); Rose White (mother)

Thea Drell Hodge (November 8, 1922 – March 3, 2008) was a member of the Association for Computing Machinery and a cofounder of the Minneapolis chapter of the Association for Women in Computing. Hodge was a pioneer for women in computer science and mentored many women in the field.

== Life and work ==
Theresa E. Drell was born in Atlantic City, New Jersey to Tully Drell and Rose White. She attended Antioch College in Ohio, where she met her husband, Philip Gibson Hodge, and graduated magna cum laude from Hunter College in New York City in 1946. She married when she was 20 years old.

Hodge worked at New York University from 1943 to 1944, then spent 1960–1967 at Illinois Institute of Technology. She headed computer centers and supervised staff working in Illinois and Minnesota. From 1967 to 1968, Hodge worked at the University of Chicago. Hodge was hired by Northwestern University in 1968, before moving to the University of Minnesota in 1971, where she worked in departments at Cray Research and the university until her retirement in 1990.

== Personal life ==
She and Philip Hodge had three children.

She died March 3, 2008, in Menlo Park, and was buried in Alta Mesa Memorial Park, Palo Alto, California.

== Awards ==
- 2004: Association for Computing Machinery Special Interest Group on University and College Computing Services Hall of Fame

== Selected publications ==
- Thea D. Hodge. (1974). The Minnesota Computer Time-Sharing Network. EDUCOM.
- Thea D. Hodge. (1978). Two-way communication between User Services and Systems programmers. In Proceedings of the 6th annual ACM SIGUCCS conference on User services (SIGUCCS '78). Association for Computing Machinery, New York, NY, USA, 9. DOI:https://doi.org/10.1145/800131.804257
- Mary C. Boyd, Lincoln Fetcher, Sara K. Graffunder, and Thea D. Hodge. (1980). Pros and cons of various user education modes. In Proceedings of the 8th annual ACM SIGUCCS conference on User services (SIGUCCS '80). Association for Computing Machinery, New York, NY, USA, 86. DOI:https://doi.org/10.1145/800086.802763
- Thea Hodge, Barbara Morgan, Barbara Wolfe, Elizabeth Little, and Douglas Van Houweling. (1983). User Services: past, present, future summary of panel discussion at USC X, Chicago. SIGUCCS Newsl. 13, 1 (Spring 1983), 5–8. DOI:https://doi.org/10.1145/1098785.1098786
