= Environmental Research =

- Discipline: Environmental science, environmental health
- Language: English

Publication details
- History: 1967-present
- Publisher: Elsevier
- Frequency: 8/year
- Impact factor: 8.431 (2021)

Standard abbreviations
- ISO 4: Environ. Res.

Indexing
- ISSN: 0013-9351 (print); 1096-0953 (web)

Links
- Journal homepage

Environmental Research is a peer-reviewed environmental science and environmental health journal published by Elsevier. The editor in chief is Jose L. Domingo. The journal's 2020 impact factor of 6.498 placed it 16th out of 203 journals in the category Public, Environmental, and Occupational Health; the 2021 impact factor increased to 8.431.
