= Barbara Wolfe =

Economist

Barbara Wolfe is an economist and the Richard A. Easterlin Professor of Economics, Population Health Sciences, and Public Affairs at the University of Wisconsin–Madison.

Wolfe is also a faculty affiliate at the Institute for Research on Poverty. She is a research associate at the NBER, and the Levy Institute of Bard College. She is also an emeritus fellow at the Institute of Labor Economics (IZA).

She obtained her PhD from the University of Pennsylvania.

== Research ==
Wolfe's research mainly focuses on health economics and the Economics of Poverty. Her works have been quote more than 19900 times according to Google Scholar. She is a member of the National Academy of Medicine.

She has published in the Journal of Economic Literature, the American Economic Review, Demography and the Journal of Human Resources.

Her research has been featured in NPR, The Atlantic, and VICE.

=== Selected bibliography ===
- Haveman, Robert; Wolfe, Barbara (1995). "The Determinants of Children's Attainments: A Review of Methods and Findings". Journal of Economic Literature.
- Summers, Anita A.; Wolfe, Barbara L. (1977). "A Comment on Summers and Wolfe: Reply". The Journal of Human Resources. 12 (3): 406.
- Haveman, Robert H.; Wolfe, Barbara L. (1984). "Schooling and Economic Well-Being: The Role of Nonmarket Effects". The Journal of Human Resources. 19 (3): 377.
- Haveman, Robert; Wolfe, Barbara; Spaulding, James (1991). "Childhood Events and Circumstances Influencing High School Completion". Demography. 28 (1): 133.
- Haveman, Robert H.; Wolfe, Barbara L., Succeeding Generations: On the Effects of Investments in Children, New York: Russell Sage Foundation, 1994 (Paperback edition, 1995).
- Summers, Anita A.; Wolfe, Barbara L.“Do Schools Make a Difference?”, American Economic Review, 67(4): 639–652, September 1977
- Haveman, Robert H.; Wolfe, Barbara L. Disability Transfers and Early Retirement: A Causal Relationship?”, Journal of Public Economics, 24: 47–66, 1984.
- Behrman, Jere R.; Wolfe, Barbara L. "Determinants of Women’s Health Status and Health‑Care Utilization in a Developing Country: A Latent Variable Approach," Review of Economics and Statistics, 66 (4), 1984.
- de Jong, Philip; Haveman, Robert H.; Wolfe, Barbara L. “Disability Transfers and the Work Decision of Older Men,” Quarterly Journal of Economics, 939–949. August, 1991
- Haveman, Robert H.; Wolfe, Barbara L.“Children’s Prospects and Children’s Policy,” Journal of Economic Perspectives, 7(4): 153–174, 1993.
- Hill, Steven; Wolfe, Barbara L. “The Effect of Health on the Work Effort of Single Mothers,” Journal of Human Resources, 30(1): 42–62, 1995.
- An, Chong Bum, Ginther, Donna; Haveman, Robert H.; Wolfe, Barbara L.“The ‘Window Problem’ in Studies of Children's Attainments: A Methodological Exploration,” Journal of the American Statistical Association, September, 1996
- Fletcher, Jason; Vidal-Fernandez, Marian; Wolfe, Barbara L. “Dynamic and Heterogenous Effects of Sibling Death on Children’s Outcomes.” PNAS. January 2018. 115–120
- Hair, Nicole; Hanson, Hanson, James; Pollak, Seth; Wolfe. Barbara L.“Association of Child Poverty, Brain Development, and Academic Achievement” JAMA Pediatrics. 2015;169(9)
