= Stephen Corey =

American poet

Stephen Corey (born 1948) was the editor of the Georgia Review. He is also the author of nine volumes of poetry. The New Georgia Encyclopedia describes him as one of the "influential" literary figures in the state of Georgia.

Corey received his BA from Binghamton University in 1971 and his M.A. in 1974. He earned his PhD in English in 1979 from the University of Florida. He served as assistant editor of the Georgia Review from 1983 to 1986, as associate editor from 1986 to 1998 and as acting editor from 1998 to 2001 and became the editor in 2006. He retired in 2019.
