= Leonard Klevan =

American scientist

- Born: New York
- Education: Yale University
- Known for: Human Identification, Forensics, Applied Biotechnology
- Awards: Leadership Award, National Center for Victims of Crime
- Scientific career
- Fields: Biotechnology
- Workplaces: Life Technologies
- Doctoral advisor: Donald Crothers

Leonard Klevan is a businessman and scientist in the fields of biochemistry and biotechnology. As of 2009 Klevan has assumed the position of president of the Human Identification Business of Life Technologies (formerly Applied Biosystems Inc.) Prior to the merging of Applied Biosystems Inc. (ABI) with Invitrogen under the name of Life Technologies, Klevan acted as president of Applied Markets for ABI which produced and marketed reagent kits for forensic DNA, paternity testing and other forms of human identification as well as products for biosecurity, food/agriculture, and environmental applications.

== Early life and education ==
Leonard Klevan was born in New York in 1951 to Julius and Shirly Klevan. He received a B.A. in chemistry from Binghamton University and a Ph.D. in physical chemistry from Yale University in 1978. He went on to do postdoctoral research at Harvard University.

== Career ==
After leaving Harvard, Klevan spent a short period of time as an adjunct professor at UCLA before moving to Maryland to work for Life Technologies Inc. (a predecessor to the Life Technologies Inc. he currently works for). In 1999 he left Life Technologies and moved to the San Francisco Bay area to become President and CEO of MiraiBio (a subsidiary of Hitachi Software Engineering). In 2005 Klevan moved to Metairie, Louisiana (a suburb of New Orleans) where he was CEO of Reliagene Technologies, a forensic testing and human identification company. ReliaGene, a privately held company founded by Dr. Sudhir Sinha in 1990 was expanding and hired Dr Klevan to grow the company further and provide corporate structure. Shortly after Hurricane Katrina, Dr. Klevan returned to California as vice president of applied markets at ABI. In 2008 ABI merged with Invitrogen under the name Life Technologies Inc. He is currently president of the Human Identification Business of Life Technologies. Klevan frequently travels abroad to meet with foreign government agencies and officials to consult on issues of forensic science and DNA databasing.

== Awards ==
In 2008 Klevan received the National Center For Victims of Crime Annual Achievement Award for his work with missing persons.

== Publications ==
- Gebeyehu, Gulilat; Klevan, Leonard; Harding, John D. (1 May 1990). "Nucleic acid capture method".
- Klevan, Leonard; Peone, Joseph; Madan, Stanley K. (October 1973). "Molecular oxygen adducts of transition metal complexes". Journal of Chemical Education. 50 (10): 670. Bibcode:1973JChEd..50..670K. doi:10.1021/ed050p670.
- Klevan, Leonard; Wang, James C. (11 November 1980). "Deoxyribonucleic acidgyrase-deoxyribonucleic acid complex containing 140 base pairs of deoxyribonucleic acid and an .alpha.2.beta.2 protein core". Biochemistry. 19 (23): 5229–5234. doi:10.1021/bi00564a012. PMID 6255987.
- Klevan, Leonard; Schumarker, Verne N (1982). "Stabilization of Z-DNA by polyarginine near physiological ionic strength". Nucleic Acids Research. 10 (21): 6809–6817. doi:10.1093/nar/10.21.6809. PMC 326966. PMID 7177854.
- Klevan, Leonard; Horton, Liz; Carlson, David P.; Eisenberg, Arthur J. (January 1995). "Chemiluminescent detection of DNA probes in forensic analysis". Electrophoresis. 16 (1): 1553–1558. doi:10.1002/elps.11501601258.
- Klevan, Leonard; Armitage, Ian M.; Crothers, Donald M. (1979). "31 P NMR studies of the solution structure and dynamics of nucleosomes and DNA". Nucleic Acids Research. 6 (4): 1607–1616. doi:10.1093/nar/6.4.1607. PMC 327794. PMID 450708.
- Gebeyehu, Gulilat; Rao, Prasad Y.; SooChan, Patricia; Simms, D.A.; Klevan, Leonard (1987). "Novel biotinylated nucleotide - analogs for labeling and colorimetric detection of DNA". Nucleic Acids Research. 15 (11): 4513–4534. doi:10.1093/nar/15.11.4513. PMC 340877. PMID 3588302.
- Klevan, Leonard; Gebeyehu, Gulilat; Rao, Prasad Y. "Nucleotide analogs for nucleic acid labeling and detection".
