= Juda Bennett =

American academic

- Education: Binghamton University (B.A.); Washington University in St. Louis (M.A., Ph.D.)
- Occupations: Author, Literary Theorist and Professor of English at The College of New Jersey

Juda Charles Bennett is an author, a literary theorist and professor of English at The College of New Jersey. He received his B.A. in English and creative writing from Binghamton University in 1988; his M.A. in English and American Literature from Washington University in St. Louis in 1989; and his Ph.D. in English and American Literature from Washington University in 1994.

Bennett is the author of Toni Morrison and the Queer Pleasure of Ghosts (2014), Essays Unzipped (2007), and The Passing Figure: Racial Confusion in Modern American Literature (1996). He is also the author of a number of literary essays on race and sexuality.
