= Jean-Germain Gros =

American scholar on African studies

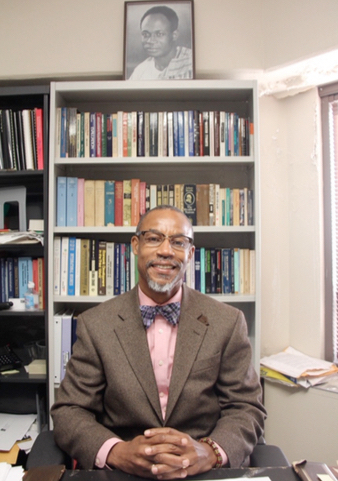
- Born: May 6, 1964 (age 62)
- Awards: University of Missouri-St. Louis Chancellors Award for Excellent Teaching in 2006

Academic background
- Education: University of California, Berkeley

Academic work
- Discipline: Political science

Jean-Germain Gros (born May 6, 1964) is a professor in political science at the University of Missouri-St. Louis.

== Education ==
Gros received his B.A in economics and sociology in 1985 from SUNY-Binghamton and his Ph.D. in political science from the University of California-Berkeley.

== Career ==
Gros joined the University of Missouri-St. Louis in 1994, holding a teaching appointment in political science and the public administration program. In 2004, Gros was the director of Missouri-Africa Program and visiting professor of political science at the University of Ghana-Legon.

== Research interests ==
Gros specializes in the subfields of comparative politics, African and Caribbean politics, with a focus on Haiti, and public policy administration, with a focus on global health care policy.

== Publications ==
Gros' research focuses on failed states.

- "Towards a Taxonomy of Failed States in the New World Order: Decaying Somalia, Liberia, Rwanda and Haiti. Gros discusses the factors associated with state failure, among them: poverty, population growth, authoritarianism, and militarism.
- State Failure, Underdevelopment, and Foreign Intervention in Haiti, New York, NY: Routledge, 2012, is a case study of the Haitian failed state.
- Global Healthcare Policy in Africa: Institutions and Politics From Colonialism to the Present, Landham. In this book, Gros’ displays interest in public policy as it relates to health care policy in Africa. Immediately after independence in the early 1960s African countries committed to providing social services, including healthcare, ‘free’ at the point of service.

== Media ==
America and You (Voice of America) from 08.23.2019.
John Lyndon Presentation. The 400th anniversary of the first arrival of African slaves in America.
