= Shalom Freedman =

American-Israeli writer and poet

Shalom (Seymour) Freedman (born June 17, 1942) is an American-Israeli writer, thinker, and poet. As a Jewish writer, his best-known work consists of conversations with thinkers and spiritual leaders centering on the concept of Avodat Hashem or service of God. As a public intellectual, his work has touched on a wide variety of issues regarding the human condition and future while focusing most urgently on Israel's struggle for survival and wellbeing.

== Early years and education ==
Born in Troy, New York, to Reuben (Kelly) Freedman and Edith (Zeibert) Freedman, he graduated from Harpur College (now Binghamton University) in 1964. He received his M.A. (thesis: “The Influence of the Religious Thought of Henry James Sr. on the Philosophy of William James”) and Ph.D. (thesis: “The American-Jewish Novel”) in English Literature and American Studies from Cornell University, under the guidance of Professor Cushing Strout.

== Books ==
In addition to countless articles and Web postings, Freedman has published nine books. Four of these have been selected as Jewish Book Club selections of the month.

His books include a work of Jewish aphoristic thought, “Life as Creation: A Jewish Way of Thinking of the World,” the autobiographical “Seven Years in Israel: A Zionist Storybook,” a book of poetry, “Mourning for My Father,” and a philosophical journal, “Small Acts of Kindness: Striving for Derech Eretz in Everyday Life in Israel.” His three works of conversations with Jewish religious and spiritual teachers focus on how they perceive their own Service of God. One of these works centers on and is largely the work of Rabbi Irving Greenberg. Among the distinguished rabbis and Torah teachers included in these conversations are Rabbis Shlomo Riskin, Berel Wein, Shubert Spero, Adin Steinsaltz, David Hartman, Nahum Rabinovich, Aharon Rakeffet, Chaim Eisen, Mendel Lewittes, Nathan Lopes Cardozo, Dr. Miriam Adahan, and more than thirty others. He has written a biography of former Israel Chief Rabbi Shlomo Goren. His most recent published work is a memoir in the form of short stories, Childhood Stories: 145 First Street Troy New York.

== Book Reviewing/Internet Writing ==
His book reviews have appeared in The Jerusalem Post, Midstream, The Journal of Jewish Political Studies, The Jewish Press, H-Net, and JBooks.

He has over five thousand reviews on Amazon where he is a 'Hall of Fame' reviewer.

His book reviews focus on Israel, Jewish Thought, Poetry, Middle East Affairs, English and American Literature, the Human Situation. His television reviews attempt to provide a brief description and critical commentary on many of the segments of America's most wide-ranging cultural program, “The Charlie Rose Show.”

== Jewish Political Affairs and Israel Advocacy Writing ==
The concern for the survival and well-being of Israel is at the heart of his public writing.

Among those who have contributed to his thoughts on Israel's situation and struggle are P. David Hornik, Dr. Joel Fishman, Moshe Bobrovsky z”l, Dr. Manfred Gerstenfeld, Dr. Yaakov Fogelman, Yossi Klein-Halevi, Barry Rubin, Hillel Halkin, Vic Rosenthal, Isi Leibler, Alan Dershowitz, and Natan Sharansky.

He has been a regular political columnist for the Arutz Sheva website. He has also contributed political articles to H-Net, Intervention.com, Nativ, Jerusalem Post, Israel Insider, Jewish Political Studies Review, Jewish Press, JBooks, Milnet.

His Israel advocacy letters and posts have appeared in more than one hundred national and international publications including Commentary, The New York Times, IHT, The New Republic, The Times of London, The Bulletin of the Atomic Scientists, The China Times.

== Poetry ==
A member of the Israel Association for Writers in English, he has been an editor of its journal, Arc, and a regular contributor to Israel's best-known English poetry journal (founded by the late Reuben Rose, and long edited by Mark Levinson) “Voices Israel.” In a survey article on Israeli poetry, Professor Howard Schwartz cited him as among the significant writers of English-language poetry in Israel. A selection of his poems from Mourning for my Father is included in Alan Kay's Jewish Book of Comfort.

The most comprehensive, easily accessible sampling of his poetry appears on the PoemHunter.com website . An E-book of 1500 poems is also available from this site.

== Bibliography ==
Books by Shalom Freedman

- Seven Years in Israel (A Zionist Storybook)(Gefen Publishers: Jerusalem, 1983) 124pp.
- Mourning for my Father (Field: Jerusalem, 1989) 128 pp.
- Life as Creation (A Jewish Way of Thinking about the World) (Jason Aronson Inc.: Northvale N.J., 1993) 139 pp.
- In the Service of God: Conversations with Teachers of Torah in Jerusalem (Jason Aronson: Northvale, N.J., 1995) 265 pp.
- Learning in Jerusalem: Dialogues with Distinguished Teachers of Judaism (Jason Aronson: Northvale N.J., 1998) 372 pp.
- (with Irving Greenberg) Living in the Image of God -- Jewish Teachings to Perfect the World: Conversations with Rabbi Irving Greenberg (Northvale, N.J.: Jason Aronson, 1998) 340 pp.
- Small Acts of Kindness: Striving for Derech Eretz in Everyday Life (Urim Publications: Jerusalem, 2004) 280 pp.
- Rabbi Shlomo Goren: Torah Sage and General (Urim Publications: Jerusalem, 2006) 253 pp.
- Childhood Stories 145 First Street Troy New York (Createspace 2011)

== References: Selected Book Reviews and Articles about His Work ==
- Berger, Shalom: Review of Shlomo Goren: Torah Sage and General. Lookstein Journal 2006.
- Chertok, Haim: Jewish Prose-Poem Review of ‘Life as Creation’, Jerusalem Post, April 29, 1994.
- Chertok, Haim: A good grey conversationalist. Review of ‘Learning in Jerusalem’, Jerusalem Post, April 2, 1999.
- Chertok, Haim: Review of ‘Shlomo Goren: Torah Sage and General’, Hadassah Magazine June–July 2007.
- Ellenson, David: Review of ‘Living in the Image of God’, Modern Judaism - Volume 20, Number 1, February 2000, pp. 113–116.
- Elkins, Dov Peretz: Review of ‘Small Acts of Kindness’, Jewish Media Review.
- Hornik, David: Review of ‘Small Acts of Kindness’, Jewish Press, Sept. 22, 2004.
- Littrell, Dennis: ‘A year in the life’, review of ‘Small Acts of Kindness’, Amazon.Com, Dec. 9, 2004.
- Kay, Alan: Jewish Book of Comfort (Jason Aronson Inc. 1997).
- Moskowitz, Ira: Writing for Sanity and Israel, Haaretz, Anglo-file Profile, May 21, 2006.
- Mitchell, Donald: A practical optimist, Review of ‘Small Acts of Kindness’, Amazon.Com, Nov. 13 2004.
- Novak, David: Review of ‘Living in the Image of God’, First Things: A Monthly Journal, May, 1999.
- Scheidemann, Mike ed.: A song to life and world peace: Selected essays and poems presented at the XIII World Congress of Poets of the World Academy of Arts and Culture (Posner and Sons: Jerusalem, 1993).
- Teicher, Morton: Review of ‘Small Acts of Kindness’ The National Jewish Post and Opinion, 2006.
