= Geraldine MacDonald =

American internet and online services pioneer

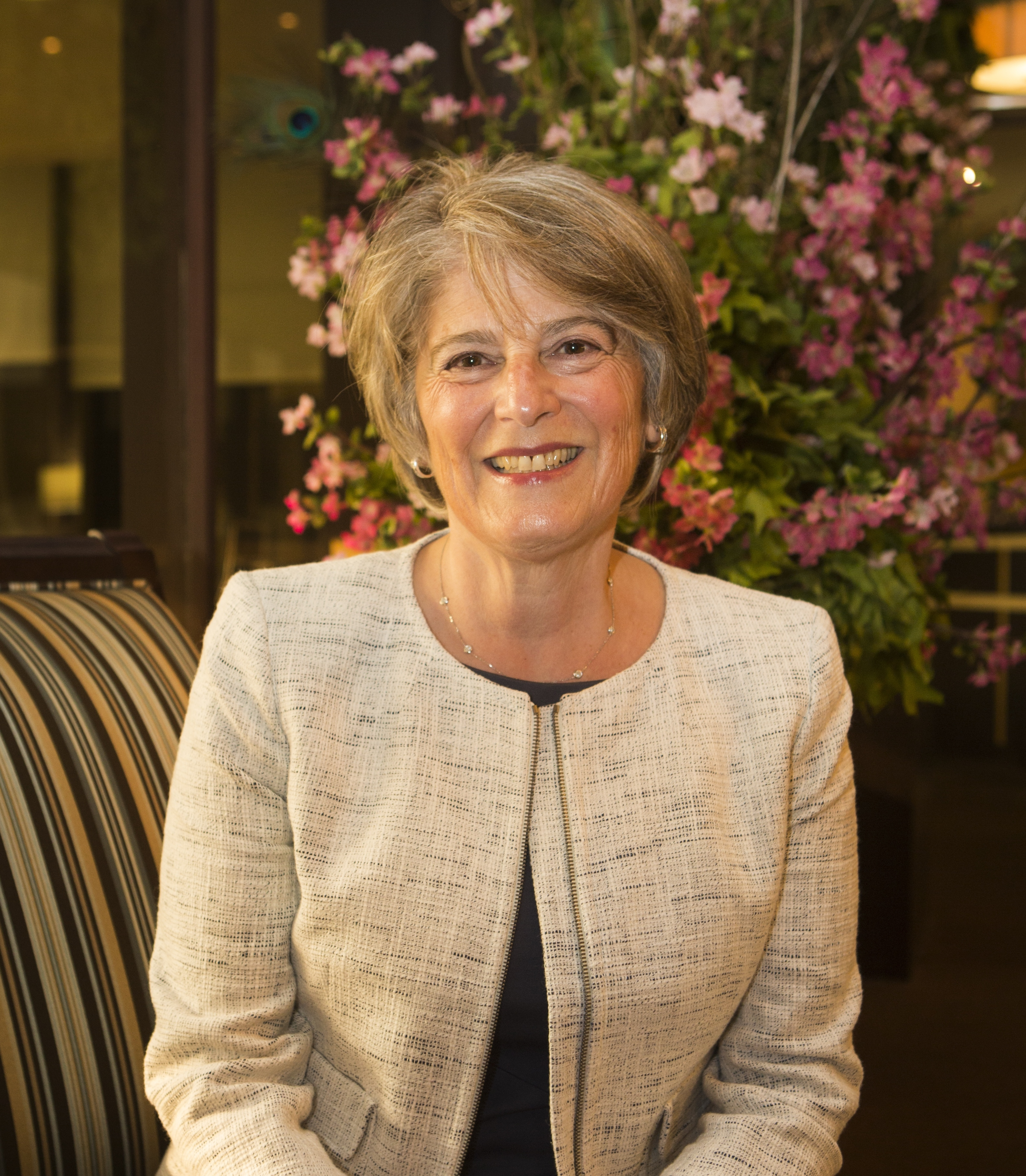
- Born: New York City
- Education: Binghamton University
- Occupations: Businesswoman, technology executive
- Known for: Building AOLnet, the world's largest dial-up network Senior Vice President, Global Access Networks at America Online

Geraldine MacDonald is an American internet and online services pioneer, best known for building and operating the world's largest dial-up network for America Online supporting over 35 million customers at its peak.

== Early life ==
MacDonald was born in New York City. Her parents were Holocaust survivors who immigrated to the United States during World War II. She attended George Washington High School (Manhattan) and earned a B.A. in psychology from Harpur College. She earned a M.S. in computer science from the Thomas J. Watson School of Engineering and Applied Science, Binghamton University.

== Career ==
MacDonald began her career as a programmer for The Equitable Life Assurance Society. She then returned to Binghamton University and held various positions within the university computing operation, and received promotions to Associate Vice President with responsibility for all academic, research and administrative computing services on campus.

MacDonald was actively involved in the connection of university campuses in New York to each other and to other developing portions of the Internet in the United States. She served on the board of NYSERNet, The New York State Education Research Network, BITNET and CREN, the Corporation for Research and Educational Networking.

== Awards and honors ==
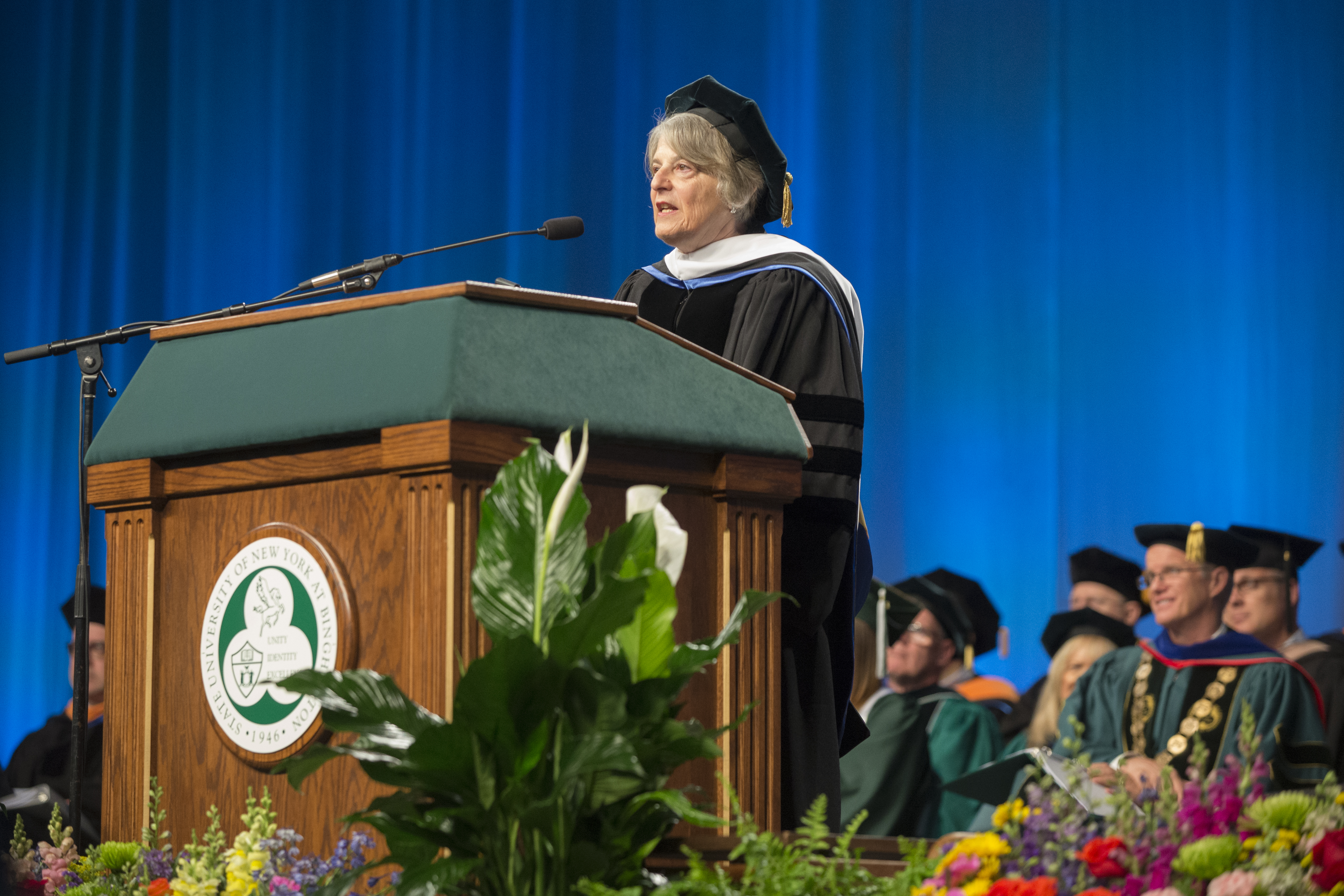
Binghamton University 2017 Watson School of Engineering and Applied Sciences Commencement Ceremony held at the Events Center, Saturday, May 20, 2017. Geraldine Knoll MacDonald '68, MS '73 received the honorary degree doctor of letters.

MacDonald was named one of the "Top 25 Unsung Heroes of the Net" in 1999 by Inter@ctive Week, a Ziff Davis publication.

In 2002, MacDonald received the ACM Special Interest Group on University and College Computing Services ACM SIGUCCS Hall of Fame Award.

In 2014, MacDonald received the Glenn G. Bartle Distinguished Alumnus Award from Binghamton University for her work in internet technology.

MacDonald was honored with a Doctor of Letters degree by Binghamton University at commencement ceremonies on May 19, 2017.
