= Joe Mele =

American online personality (born 1998)

- Born: Joseph Michael Mele; December 15, 1998 (age 27); Long Island, New York, U.S.
- Occupations: Online personality; actor; comedian

Instagram information
- Page: mmmjoemele
- Followers: 4.2 million

TikTok information
- Page: mmmjoemele
- Years active: 2019–present
- Genre: Comedy
- Followers: 32.6 million

YouTube information
- Channel: mmmjoemele
- Years active: 2020–present
- Subscribers: 10.4 million
- Views: 10 billion
- Last updated: October 18, 2026

Joseph Michael Mele (born December 15, 1998) is an American social media personality and content creator, best known for his comedy sketches and short-form videos. He gained prominence online through videos featuring members of his family, particularly his father, Frank Mele. Mele regularly uploads short-form content to his YouTube, TikTok, and Instagram, primarily depicting him pranking his father, or doing trends.

== Early life ==
Mele was born on December 15, 1998 and was raised in Long Island, New York. He attended Binghamton University to study finance, before dropping out to pursue content creation.

== Career ==
Mele began posting videos on TikTok in late 2019. As of October 2026, he has garnered over 50 million followers across social media platforms, including 32 million TikTok followers and over 10 million subscribers on YouTube, amongst other channels. Mele's content includes family humor, impersonations and challenges. His father, Frank Mele, makes regular appearances in his videos. One of Mele's most popular videos features his father dressed as Anton Ego, from the animated film Ratatouille. Pixar reached out to the father-son duo to turn their viral home sketch into an official production. He was featured on the social media list of Forbes 30 Under 30 2025.

== Other appearances ==
Mele and his father led a national television commercial for Gillette Labs. In 2026, he appeared in Paramount+'s official TikTok video alongside Liam Neeson and Pamela Anderson to promote the film, The Naked Gun. He also collaborated with Tom Cruise for Paramount Pictures' Mission: Impossible – The Final Reckoning movie rollout.
