= Yasmin Hurd =

American neuroscientist

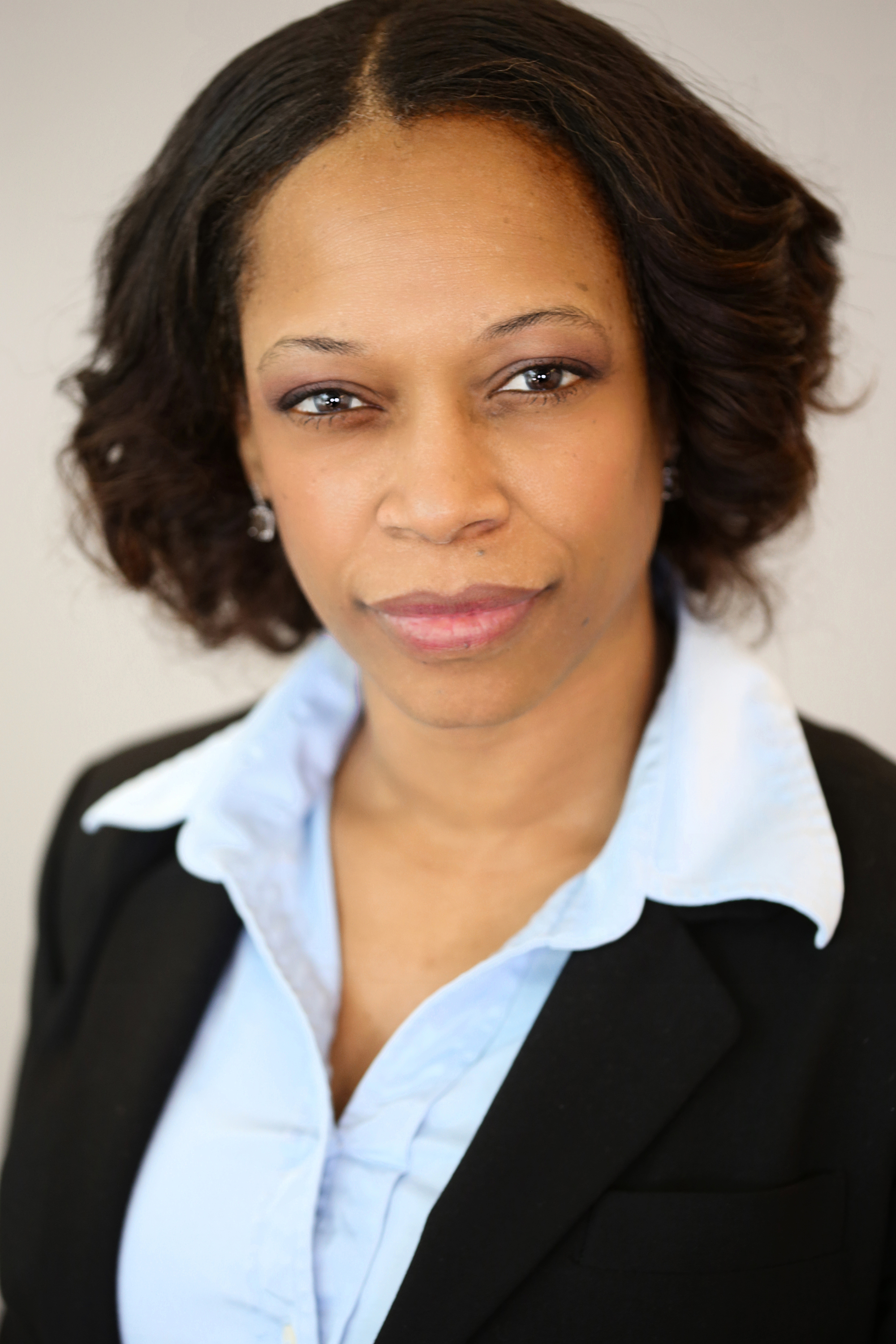
- Education: Binghamton University, Karolinska Institutet
- Scientific career
- Fields: Neuroscience, Neurobiology of Addiction
- Workplaces: Icahn School of Medicine at Mount Sinai

Yasmin Hurd is the Ward-Coleman Chair of Translational Neuroscience and the Director of the Addiction Institute at Mount Sinai. Hurd holds appointments as faculty of Neuroscience, Psychiatry, Pharmacology and Systems Therapeutics at the Icahn School of Medicine at Mount Sinai in New York City and is globally recognized for her translational research on the underlying neurobiology of substance use disorders and comorbid psychiatric disorders. Hurd's research on the transgenerational effects of early cannabis exposure on the developing brain and behavior and on the therapeutic properties of cannabidiol has garnered substantial media attention. In 2017, Dr. Hurd was elected to the National Academy of Medicine and, in 2022, Dr. Hurd was elected to the National Academy of Sciences (NAS).

== Early life and education ==
As a child growing up in Jamaica, Hurd was particularly interested in how the brain works. To aid in covering her expenses for college, she decided to work in a research lab, which required her to take care of animals. This experience was one that sparked her childhood curiosity and set her on a path to a career in neuroscience research. She completed her PhD at the Karolinska Institutet in Stockholm, Sweden, where her work with micro-dialysis led to advances in neuropharmacology. She spent time as a Pharmacology Research Associate Fellow with the National Institutes of Health and Staff Fellow at the National Institute of Mental Health.

== Career ==
Hurd's career began when she returned to her alma mater, Karolinska Institute as a faculty member and professor for 13 years before beginning her career at Mount Sinai. At Mount Sinai, Hurd is currently the Ward-Coleman Chair of Translational Neuroscience and the Director of the Addiction Institute of Mount Sinai within the Behavioral Health System.

She is also the former director of the medical school's combined MD/PhD Medical Scientist Training Program. Hurd served on advisory boards including the Clinical Neuroendocrinology Branch, National Institute of Mental Health (NIMH), National Institute of Drug Abuse (NIDA) Board of Scientific Counselors and the Center for Scientific Review (CSR) advisory Council.

Hurd is a professor at the Icahn School of Medicine at Mount Sinai Hospital in New York City, where she studies addiction in people and animal models. Her animal research has revealed that drugs like marijuana can have profound effects on the developing and fetal adolescent brain, including effects that can even extend to the future generations of drug-users.

She is also a member of the National Academy of Medicine, American Society for Neuroscience, New York Academy of Sciences, and the College on Problems of Drug Dependence. Hurd's work has been cited more than 13,000 times, and she has an H-Index of 69.

Her work on the neurobiology of addiction, especially with regard to the effects of heroin and the developmental changes caused by cannabis, have been profiled in a variety of popular news and documentary sources.

== Research ==
Hurd’s research focuses on the effects of cannabis and heroin on the brain. Her pre-clinical research is complemented with clinical laboratory investigations evaluating the therapeutic potential of medications such as the use of phytocannabinoids in the treatment of psychiatric disorders. One area of concentration has set out to address the gateway drug theory. Her research showed that CBD could be considered as a potentially significant option for treating patients recovering from opioid abuse, a finding that has received public attention.

=== Grants ===
Ongoing research grants as of 2020:

Title, Role and Description
Title and No.	Role	Description
Cannabidiol in the treatment of opioid use disorder UG3 DA050323, NIH/NIDA	Principal Investigator	Conduct pharmacokinetic and pharmacodynamic studies investigating the effects of cannabidiol in healthy controls and in individuals with opioid use disorder.
Translating CBD Treatment for Heroin Addiction; R01 DA048613, NIH/NIDA	Co-Principal Investigator	A study of the neurobiological effects of CBD to reduce craving in human opioid users.
Transcriptional and epigenetic mechanisms in human heroin abuse; 2P01DA008227, NIH/NIDA	Project Principal Investigator	Characterizing epigenetic networks in mesocorticolimbic structures underlying drug abuse in humans with complementary mechanistic studies in rodents.
Cell Specificity of the Human Heroin Epigenome; R01 DA043247, NIH/NIDA	Co-Principal Investigator	Determining the epigenetic landscape of discrete cell populations in the prefrontal cortex of human heroin abusers.
Neurodevelopmental effects of cannabis and its epigenetic regulation; R01 DA030359, NIH/NIDA	Principal Investigator	Studying the effects of prenatal and adolescent cannabis exposure on the developing brain and adult brain and behavior.
Prevention of the cardiovascular medical consequences of drug overdose; R01DA037317, NIH/NIDA	Co-Investigator	Evaluation of (1) high-risk genetic polymorphisms that are predictive of drug overdose fatality; (2) serum biomarkers that predict tissue/organ injury from drug toxicity; and (3) prospective validation of a previously derived clinical risk tool in the Toxicology Investigators’ Consortium (TOXIC).

== Publications ==
Partial list ranked by third-party citations:

- Maze, Ian; Covington, Herbert E.; Dietz, David M.; LaPlant, Quincey; Renthal, William; Russo, Scott J.; Mechanic, Max; Mouzon, Ezekiell; Neve, Rachael L.; Haggarty, Stephen J.; Ren, Yanhua (2010-01-08). "Essential role of the histone methyltransferase G9a in cocaine-induced plasticity". Science. 327 (5962): 213–216. Bibcode:2010Sci...327..213M. doi:10.1126/science.1179438. ISSN 1095-9203. PMC 2820240. PMID 20056891. Cited by 511 publications.
- LaPlant, Quincey; Vialou, Vincent; Covington, Herbert E.; Dumitriu, Dani; Feng, Jian; Warren, Brandon L.; Maze, Ian; Dietz, David M.; Watts, Emily L.; Iñiguez, Sergio D.; Koo, Ja Wook (September 2010). "Dnmt3a regulates emotional behavior and spine plasticity in the nucleus accumbens". Nature Neuroscience. 13 (9): 1137–1143. doi:10.1038/nn.2619. ISSN 1546-1726. PMC 2928863. PMID 20729844. Cited by 449 publications.
- Caberlotto, Laura; Hurd, Yasmin L.; Murdock, Paul; Wahlin, Jean Philippe; Melotto, Sergio; Corsi, Mauro; Carletti, Renzo (2003). "Neurokinin 1 receptor and relative abundance of the short and long isoforms in the human brain". European Journal of Neuroscience. 17 (9): 1736–1746. doi:10.1046/j.1460-9568.2003.02600.x. ISSN 1460-9568. PMID 12752772. S2CID 22031596. Cited by 393 publications.
- Östlund, Hanna; Keller, Eva; Hurd, Yasmin L. (2003). "Estrogen Receptor Gene Expression in Relation to Neuropsychiatric Disorders". Annals of the New York Academy of Sciences. 1007 (1): 54–63. Bibcode:2003NYASA1007...54O. doi:10.1196/annals.1286.006. ISSN 1749-6632. PMID 14993040. S2CID 19627839. Cited by 246 publications.
- Österlund, Marie; G.J.M. Kuiper, George; Gustafsson, Jan-Åke; Hurd, Yasmin L (1998-02-01). "Differential distribution and regulation of estrogen receptor-? and -? mRNA within the female rat brain1First published on the World Wide Web on 10 December 1997.1". Molecular Brain Research. 54 (1): 175–180. doi:10.1016/S0169-328X(97)00351-3. ISSN 0169-328X. PMID 9526077. Cited by 390 publications.
- Caberlotto, Laura; Jimenez, Patricia; Overstreet, David H.; Hurd, Yasmin L.; Mathé, Aleksander A.; Fuxe, Kjell (April 1999). "Alterations in neuropeptide Y levels and Y1 binding sites in the Flinders Sensitive Line rats, a genetic animal model of depression". Neuroscience Letters. 265 (3): 191–194. doi:10.1016/S0304-3940(99)00234-7. PMID 10327163. S2CID 38353528. Cited by 357 publications.
- Hurd, Yasmin L.; Herkenham, Miles (1993). "Molecular alterations in the neostriatum of human cocaine addicts". Synapse. 13 (4): 357–369. doi:10.1002/syn.890130408. ISSN 1098-2396. PMID 7683144. S2CID 21878092. Cited by 309 publications.

== Professional affiliations ==
A partial list of professional affiliations and committees includes:

Elected Member, National Academy of Medicine; American Society for Neuroscience; New York Academy of Sciences; The College on Problems of Drug Dependence; Vice-Chair, ACNP Minority Task Force; Editorial Board Member, Biological Psychiatry; Brain & Behavior Research Foundation, Scientific Council member; Editorial Board Member, Cannabis and Cannabinoid Research; Editorial Board, National Academies’ Forum on Neuroscience and Nervous System Disorders, and member, the SfN Public Education and Communication Committee.

Professional societies include:

American College Neuropsychopharmacology, Society for Neuroscience, New York Academy of Sciences, College on Problems of Drug Dependence, and the Society for Biological Psychiatry.
