= Human and Ecological Risk Assessment =

- Discipline: Environmental health, ecology, risk analysis
- Language: English
- Edited by: Mark Gregory Robson

Publication details
- History: 1995-present
- Publisher: Taylor & Francis
- Frequency: Bimonthly
- Impact factor: 2.30 (2019)

Standard abbreviations
- ISO 4: Hum. Ecol. Risk Assess.

Indexing
- CODEN: HERAFR
- ISSN: 1080-7039 (print); 1549-7860 (web)
- LCCN: 95648410
- OCLC no.: 804152999

Links
- Journal homepage; Online access; Online archive

Human and Ecological Risk Assessment is a bimonthly peer-reviewed scientific journal covering risk analysis as it relates to environmental health and ecology. It was established in 1995 and is published by Taylor & Francis. It is the official journal of the Association for Environmental Health and Sciences Foundation. The editor-in-chief is Mark Gregory Robson (Rutgers University). According to the Journal Citation Reports, the journal has a 2019 impact factor of 2.30, ranking it 149th out of 225 journals in the category "Environmental Sciences".
