= Jill Afrin =

American psychiatrist

Jill Afrin (born 1962) is a psychiatrist who specializes in working with deaf populations in South Carolina, and is also credited as the first telepsychiatrist in the state.

== Biography ==
Afrin was born in Suffern, New York in 1962. Jeanette Newman, her mother was a social worker, public relation counselor, and a journalist while Edward Newman worked as a crime reporter who died when she was 4 years old.

Afrin earned her undergraduate degree in biochemistry from State University of New York at Binghamton in 1984. The same year Afrin enrolled into Vanderbilt University School of Medicine. After graduating with her medical degree, Dr. Afrin completed an internship and residency in psychiatry at the Medical University of South Carolina. She was later awarded a fellowship in community and emergency psychiatry in 1992. Throughout college and medical training she learned sign language which she later on applied in her career.

In 1989, the South Carolina Department of Mental Health began the Deaf Services Program to provide psychiatric help to the deaf and hard of hearing throughout the state. While case managers and clinical staff were fluent in sign-language, the non-signing psychiatrists had to rely on the clinical staff and the case managers in providing the help which took away from the crucial relationship needed to develop between the patient and psychiatrist due to having an interpreter. Ideally, they needed a psychiatrist who was also fluent in sign language.

== Career ==
In 1992, Afrin started working with the Department of Mental Health's Deaf Services Program. Afrin's work primarily consisted of holding therapy sessions with deaf patients through the mid-1990s and initially, she was required to travel across the state to visit patients. This allowed her to see about 10 patients each week. In 1995, Afrin wanted to start a family, and could not continue to travel as she been doing. The Deaf Services Program was able to accommodate her needs and installed videoconferencing equipment in several hospitals and health centers in the state, and expanded the opportunities for Afrin to treat patients. This method of treating patients using telecommunication, called telepsychiatry, was therefore initiated through Afrin's efforts, making her the first telepsychiatrist in the state.

== Publications ==
- Jill N. Afrin; A. Barry Critchfield (1997). "Low-Cost Telepsychiatry for the Deaf in South Carolina". Proceedings of the AMIA Annual Fall Symposium. AIMA: 901. PMC 2233381.
