= Paul C. Morrissey =

American comedian

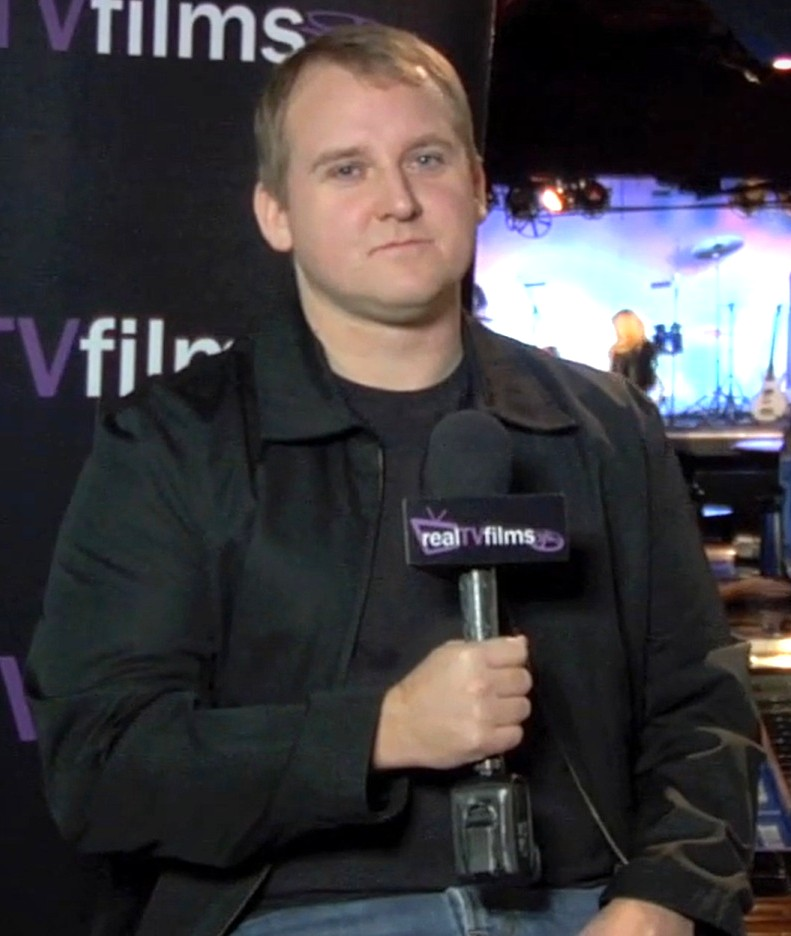
Morrissey in 2013

Paul C. Morrissey is an American comedian.

Morrissey attended SUNY Cortland where he played college basketball as a point guard. After a brief stint as a television sports anchor, Morrissey began performing at comedy clubs across the United States and in Canada.

He has appeared on The Late Late Show with Craig Ferguson four times.
